= Housing estate =

Group of homes and other buildings built together as a single development

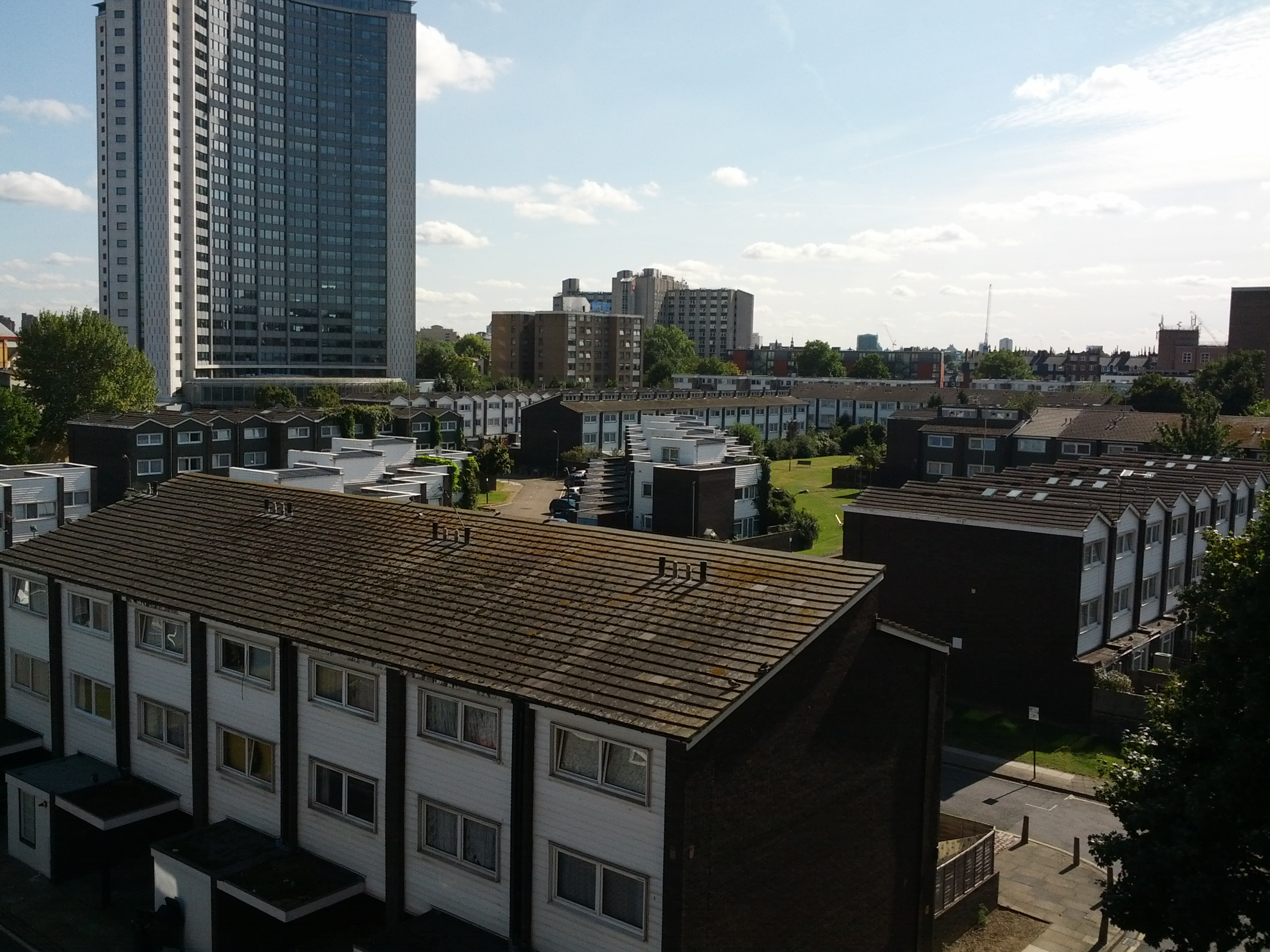
A housing estate in West Kensington, with many rows of similar terraced flats.

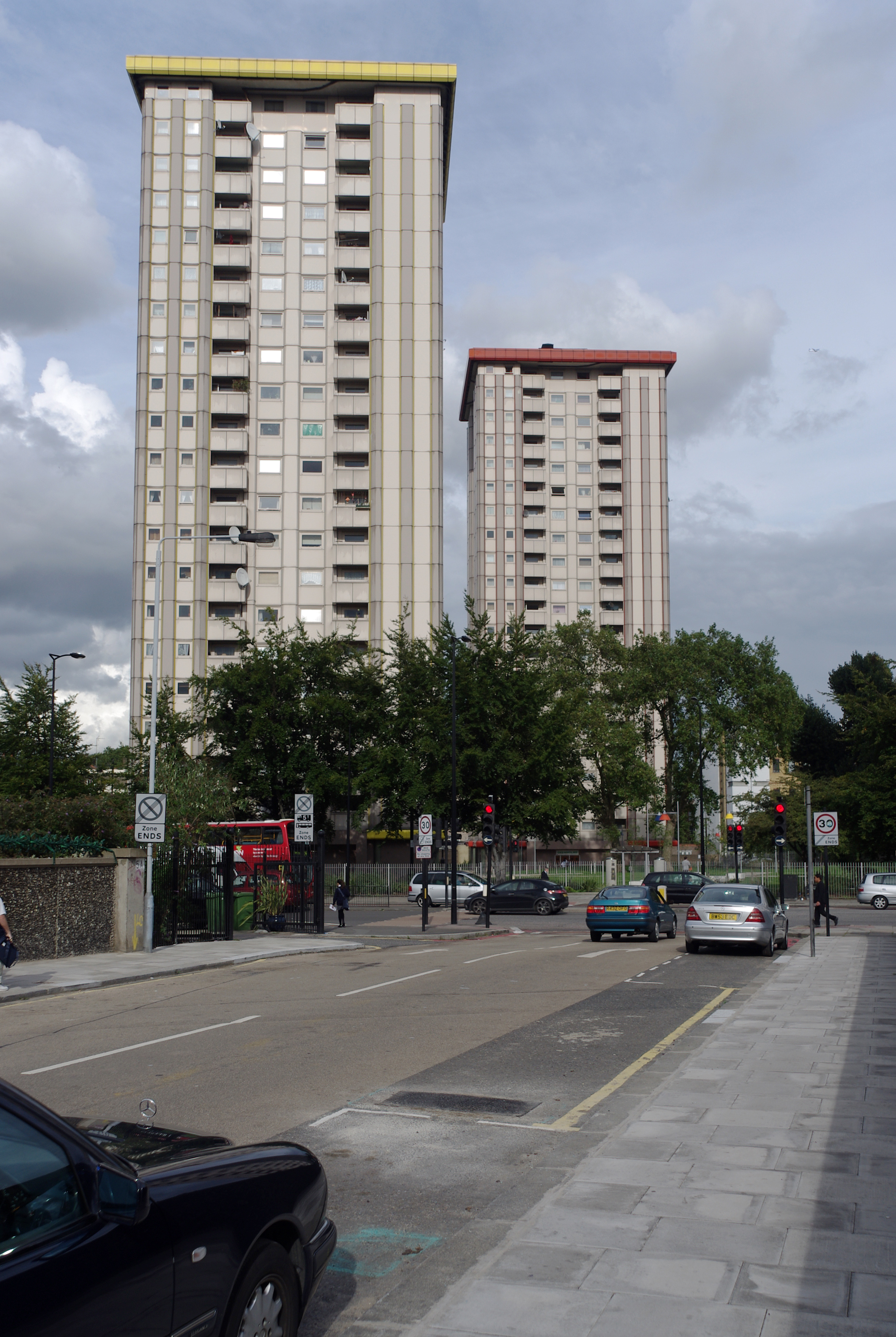
A housing estate in Camden Town, London, with two blocks of flats visible

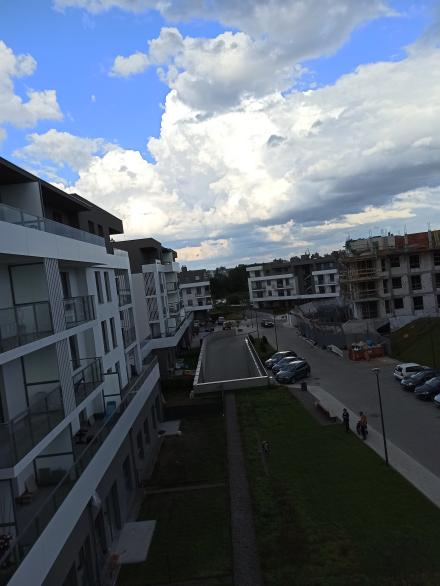
A modern housing estate in Gdańsk, Poland

A housing estate (or sometimes housing complex, housing development, subdivision or community) is a group of homes and other buildings built together as a single development. The exact form may vary from country to country.

Popular throughout the United States and the United Kingdom, they often consist of single family detached, semi-detached ("duplex") or terraced homes, with separate ownership of each dwelling unit. Building density depends on local planning norms.

In major Asian cities, such as Hong Kong, Kuala Lumpur, Shanghai, Shenzhen, Singapore, Seoul, Taipei, and Tokyo, an estate may range from detached houses to high-density tower blocks with or without commercial facilities; in Europe and America, these may take the form of town housing, high-rise housing projects, or the older-style rows of terraced houses associated with the Industrial Revolution, detached or semi-detached houses with small plots of land around them forming gardens, and are frequently without commercial facilities and such.

In Central and Eastern Europe, living in housing estates is a common way of living. Most of these housing estates originated during the communist era because the construction of large housing estates was an important part of building plans in communist countries in Europe. They can be located in suburban and urban areas.

Accordingly, a housing estate is usually built by a single contractor, with only a few styles of house or building design, so they tend to be uniform in appearance.

A housing development is "often erected on a tract of land by one builder and controlled by one management." In the United Kingdom, the term is quite broad and can include anything from high-rise government-subsidised housing right through to more upmarket, developer-led suburban tract housing. Such estates are usually designed to minimise through-traffic flows and provide recreational space in the form of parks and greens.

== Etymology ==
The use of the term may have arisen from an area of housing being built on what had been a country estate as towns and cities expanded in and after the 19th century. It was in use by 1901. Reduction of the phrase to mere "estate" is common in the United Kingdom and Ireland (especially when preceded by the specific estate name), but not in the United States.

== Housing types ==
There are several different housing types utilized by housing developers. Each of the different housing types will have their distinctive characteristics, density ranges, number of units, and floors.

- Single Detached: This type of housing will be detached from other housing types. This type of unit houses lower densities. Lawns are an option for this kind of design, with distinctive public and private spaces. A single detached can have up to three floors.
  - Commonly referred to as: House, Cottage, Villa, or Bungalow.
- Duplex, Triplex: This type of housing can have two or three dwelling units in a detached building. The units could be together or separate depending on the location of the duplex. A duplex will also have an option for a yard in order to keep their private space. This type of housing will allow for higher density housing compared to the single detached units. Duplex, and Triplex can account for 2-3 units, and have up to 3 floors.
  - Commonly referred to as: Semi-detached, Double House, Accessory unity, Ancillary unit, Carriage unit, or Twin Home.
- Big house, Multiplex: Big house, Multiplex can come in many forms, it can have a single or muli-level unit. Just like the duplex, it can have multiple floors, up to 3 floors. It can account for up to 5 units as well. This type of housing will have a higher density than single detached housing.
  - Commonly referred to as: Quadruplex, Mansion townhomes, back to back semi-detached, or Grand house.
- Other types: Side Attached, Stacked Rowhouse, Small Apartment, Low-rise Apartment, Mid-rise Apartment, Apartment over Commercial, High-Rise Apartment.

== Asia ==
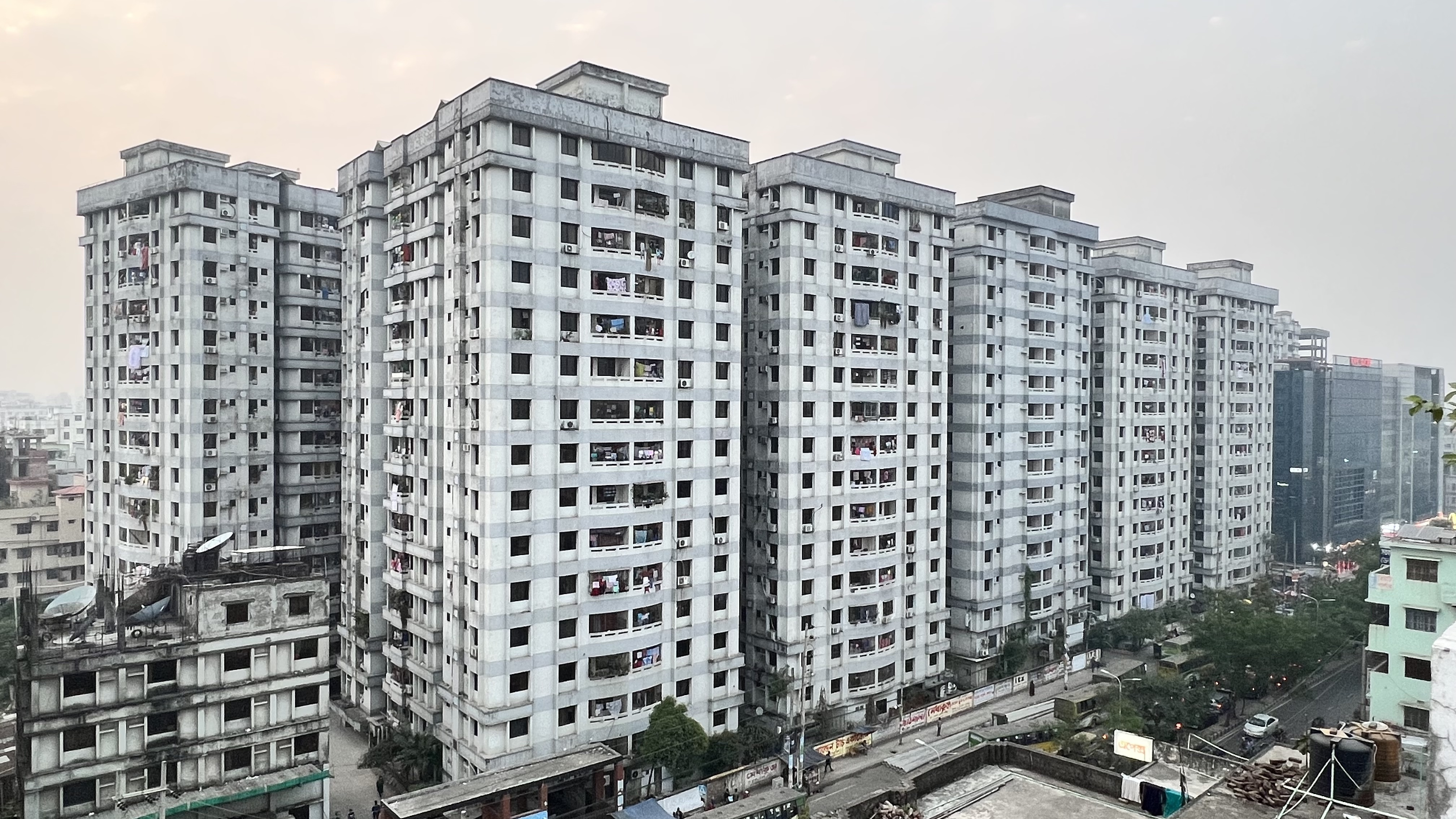
Japan Garden City, a middle class housing estate in Mohammadpur, Dhaka, Bangladesh

=== Hong Kong ===
Due to dense population and government control of land use, Hong Kong's most common residential housing form is the highrise housing estate, which may be publicly owned, privately owned, or semi-private. Due to the real-estate developers oligopoly (sometimes called real estate hegemony, Chinese: 地產霸權) in the territory, and the economies of scale of mass developments, there is the tendency of new private tower block developments with 10 to over 100 towers, ranging from 30 to 70 stories high.

Public housing provides affordable homes for those on low incomes, with rents which are heavily subsidised, financed by financial activities such as rents and charges collected from car parks and shops within or near the estates. They may vary in scale, and are usually located in the remote or less accessible parts of the territory, but urban expansion has put some of them in the heart of the urban area. Although some units are destined exclusively for rental, some of the flats within each development are earmarked for sale at prices that are lower than for private developments.

Private housing estates usually feature a cluster of high-rise buildings, often with its own shopping centre or market in the case of larger developments. Mei Foo Sun Chuen, built by Mobil, is the earliest (1965) and largest (99 blocks) example of its kind. Since the mid-1990s, private developers have been incorporating leisure facilities including clubhouse facilities, namely swimming pools, tennis courts and function rooms in their more up-market developments. The most recent examples would also have cinemas, dance studios, cigar-rooms.

Uniform high-rise developments may form 'wall effect (Chinese: 屏風效應)', adversely affecting air circulation, causing some controversy. In-fill developments will tend to be done by smaller developers with less capital. These will be smaller in scale, and less prone to the wall effect.

=== Pakistan ===
Given the security situation and power shortages in South Asia, 'gated communities' with self-generated energy and modern amenities (24-hour armed security, schools, hospitals, a fire department, retail shopping, restaurants and entertainment centres ) such as Bahria Town and DHA have been developed in all major Pakistani cities. Bahria Town is the largest private housing society in Asia. Bahria has been featured by international magazines and news agencies such as GlobalPost, Newsweek, Los Angeles Times and Emirates 24/7, referred to as the prosperous face of Pakistan. Gated communities in Pakistan are targeted towards upper middle class and upper class, and are mostly immune from problems of law enforcement.

== Europe ==
=== Czech Republic and Slovakia ===
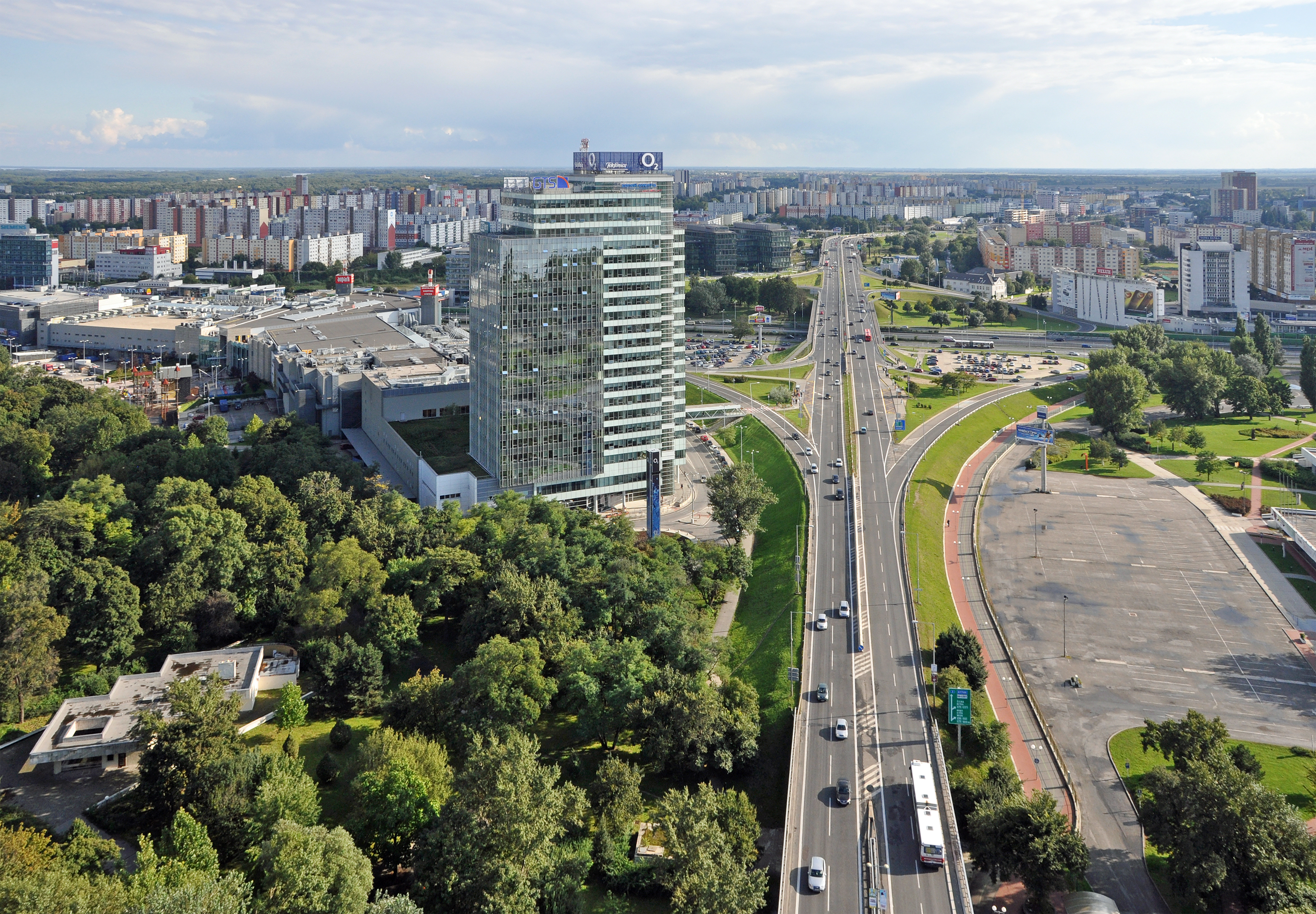
Petržalka in Bratislava, Slovakia. The largest housing estate of its sort in Central Europe.

Forms of housing estates may vary in the Czech Republic and Slovakia. During the Communist era of Czechoslovakia, construction of large housing estates (Czech: sídliště, Slovak: sídlisko) was an important part of building plans in the country, as the government wanted to provide large quantities of fast and affordable housing for all people, as well as to slash costs by employing uniform designs over the whole country. They also sought to foster a "collectivistic" in its people.

Most buildings in Czech and Slovak housing estates are the so called paneláks, a colloquial term in Czech and Slovak for a large panel system panel building constructed of pre-fabricated, pre-stressed concrete, such as those extant in the former Czechoslovakia (now the Czech Republic & Slovakia) and elsewhere in the world. Large housing estates of concrete panel buildings (paneláks) now dominate the streets of Prague, Bratislava and other towns. The largest such housing estate in Central Europe can be found in Petržalka (population about 130,000), a part of the Slovak capital of Bratislava.

People living in these housing estates usually own their individual apartments, mainly due to the fact that majority of the individual apartments went from being publicly owned by the state to being privately owned, as they were sold to most apartment occupants by the government for small, symbolic prices after the fall of socialism. People can also rent apartments, usually through real estate agents and private landlords, although some apartments are still owned by the state and are usually used for social housing. There's usually a mix of social classes in these housing estates.

=== Britain and Ireland ===
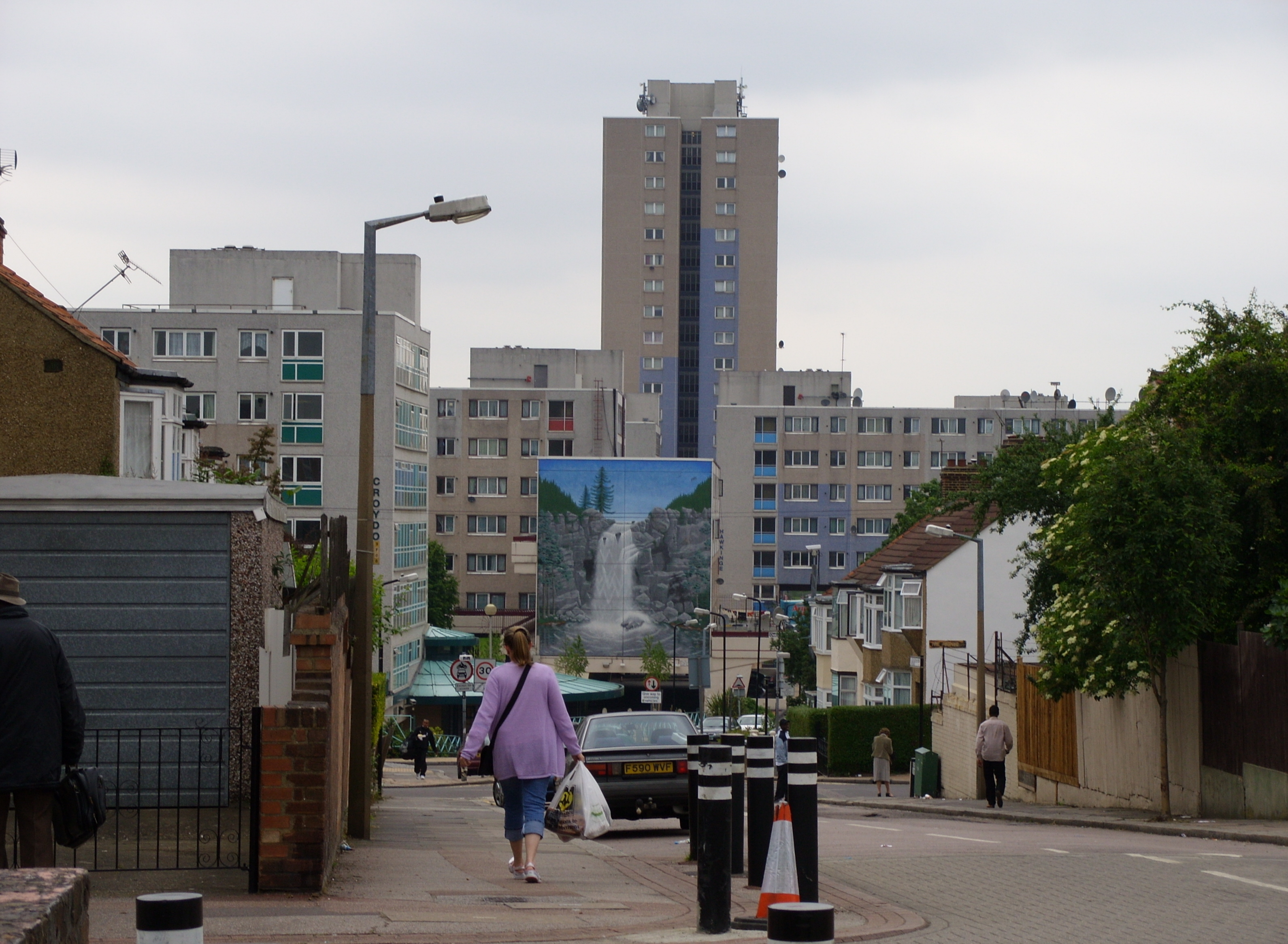
The high-density Corbusian-style Broadwater Farm Estate in London N17.

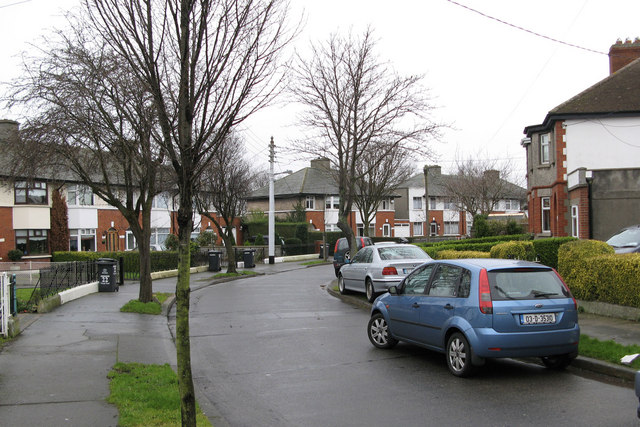
A circa 1920s middle-class housing estate in Whitehall, Dublin D09.

In Britain and Ireland, housing estates have become prevalent since the Second World War, as a more affluent population demanded larger and more widely spaced houses coupled with the increase of car usage for which terraced streets were unsuitable.

Housing estates were produced by either local authorities (more recently, housing associations) or by private developers. The former tended to be a means of producing public housing leading to monotenure estates full of council houses often known as "council estates". The latter can refer to higher end tract housing for the middle class and even upper middle class.

Demand for land has seen many towns and cities increase in size for relatively moderate increases in population. This has been largely at the expense of rural and greenfield land. Recently, there has been some effort to address this problem by banning the development of out-of-town commercial developments and encouraging the reuse of brownfield or previously developed sites for residential building. Nevertheless, the demand for housing continues to rise, and in the UK at least has precipitated a significant housing crisis.

== North America ==
=== United States ===
Forms of housing estates in the United States include tract housing, apartment complexes, and public housing.

== Gallery ==
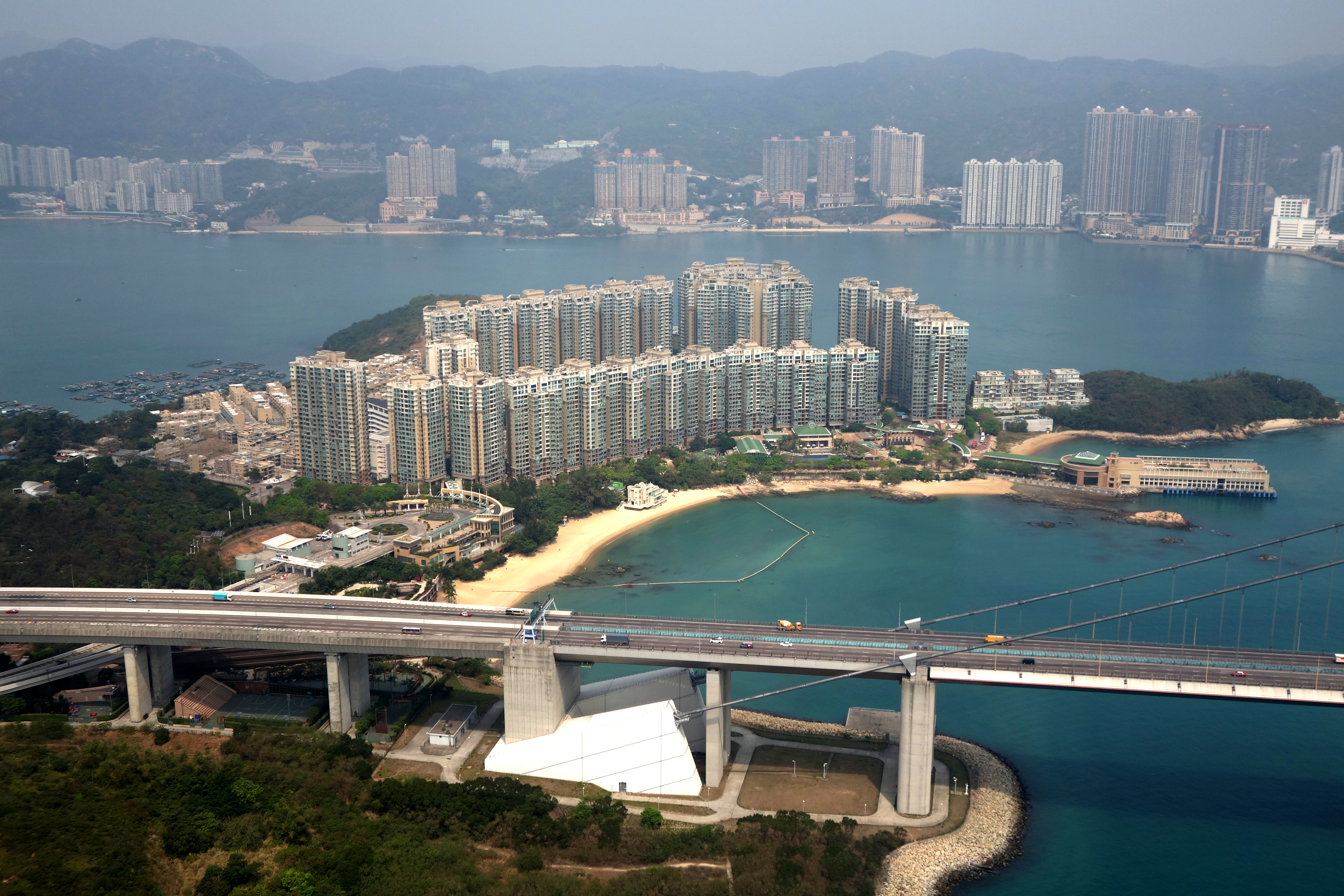
Park Island, Hong Kong

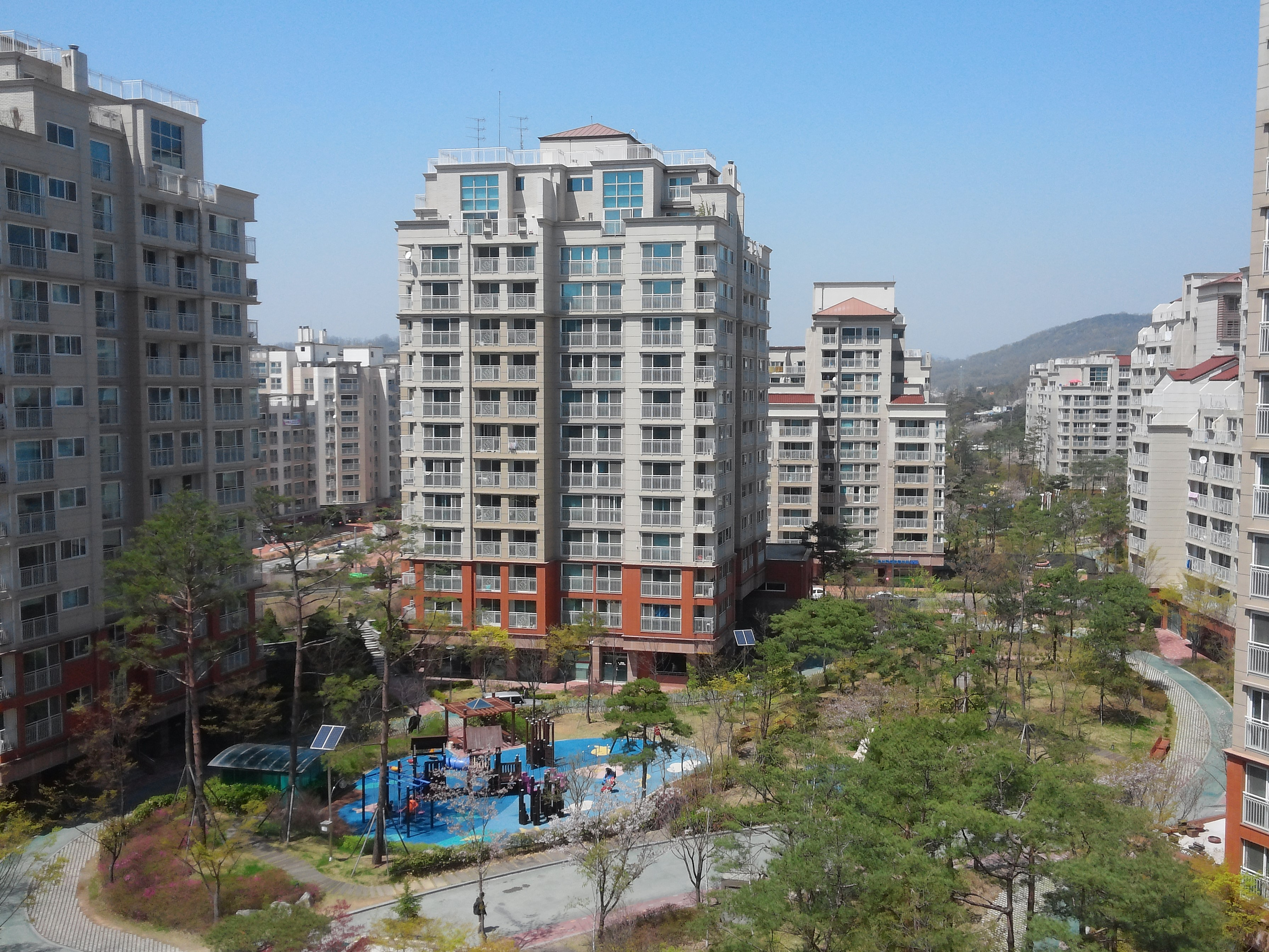
Eunpyeong New Town, Seoul

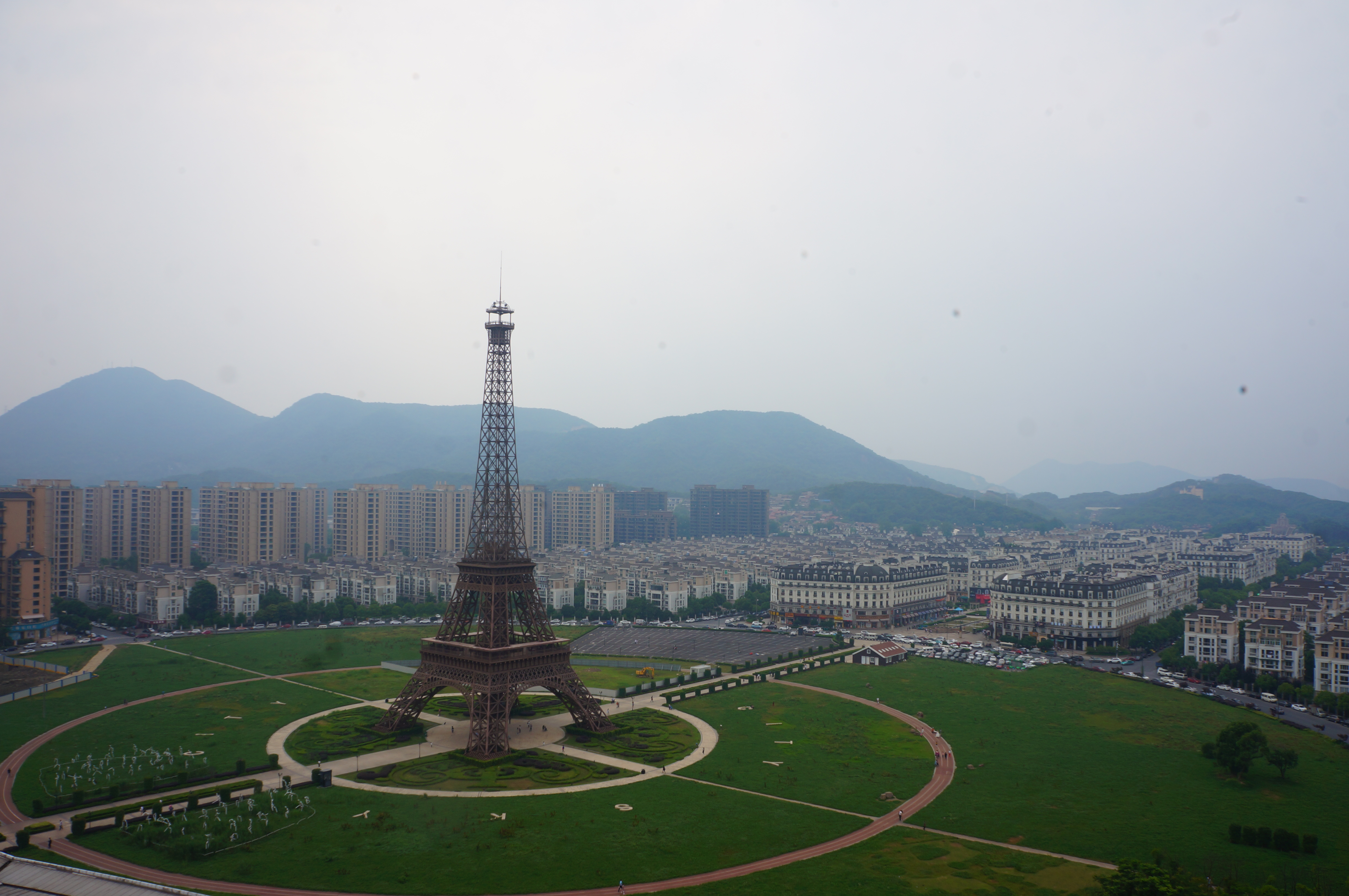
Tianducheng, Hangzhou

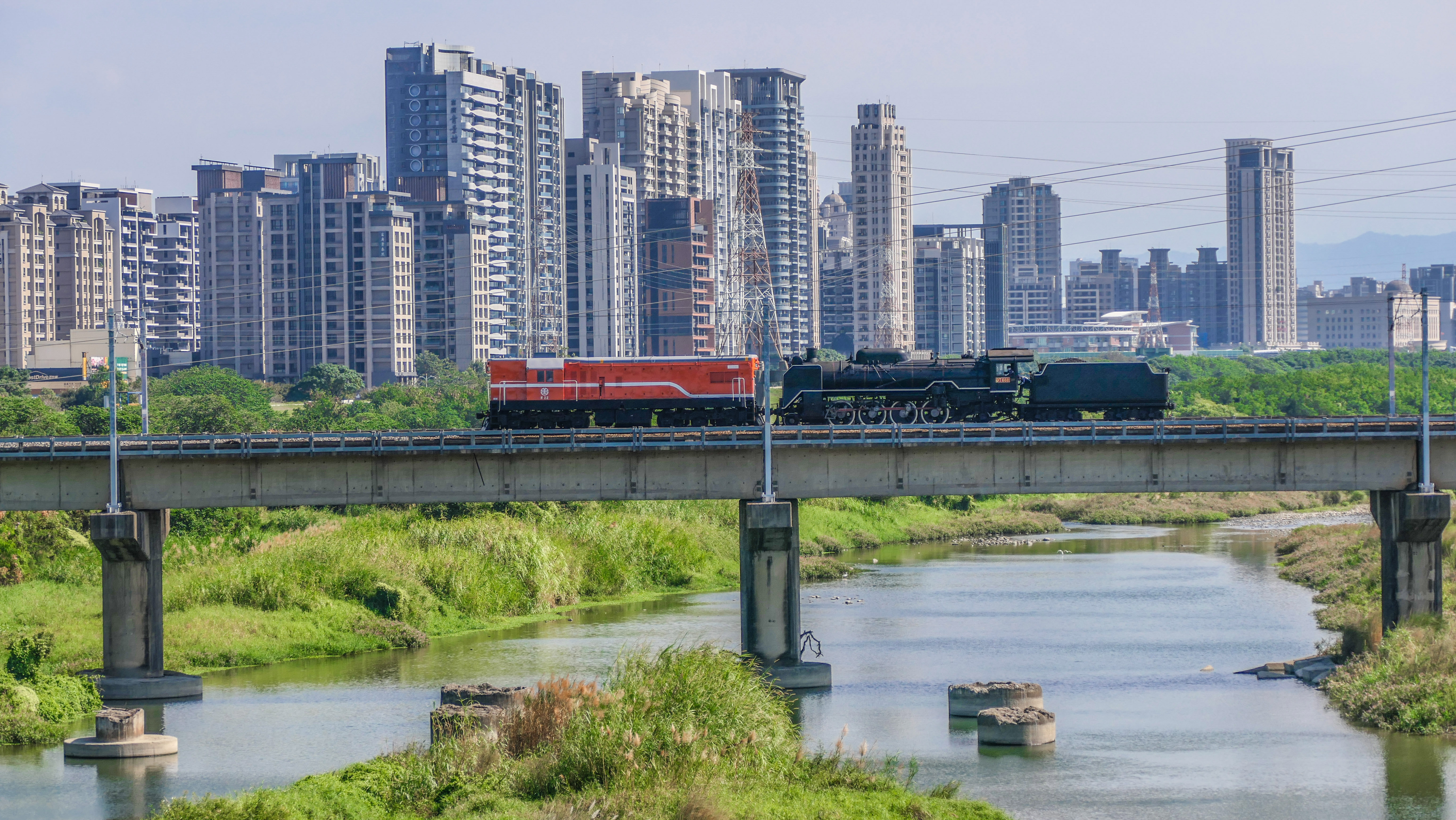
Different housing estates Zhubei, Hsinchu County, Taiwan

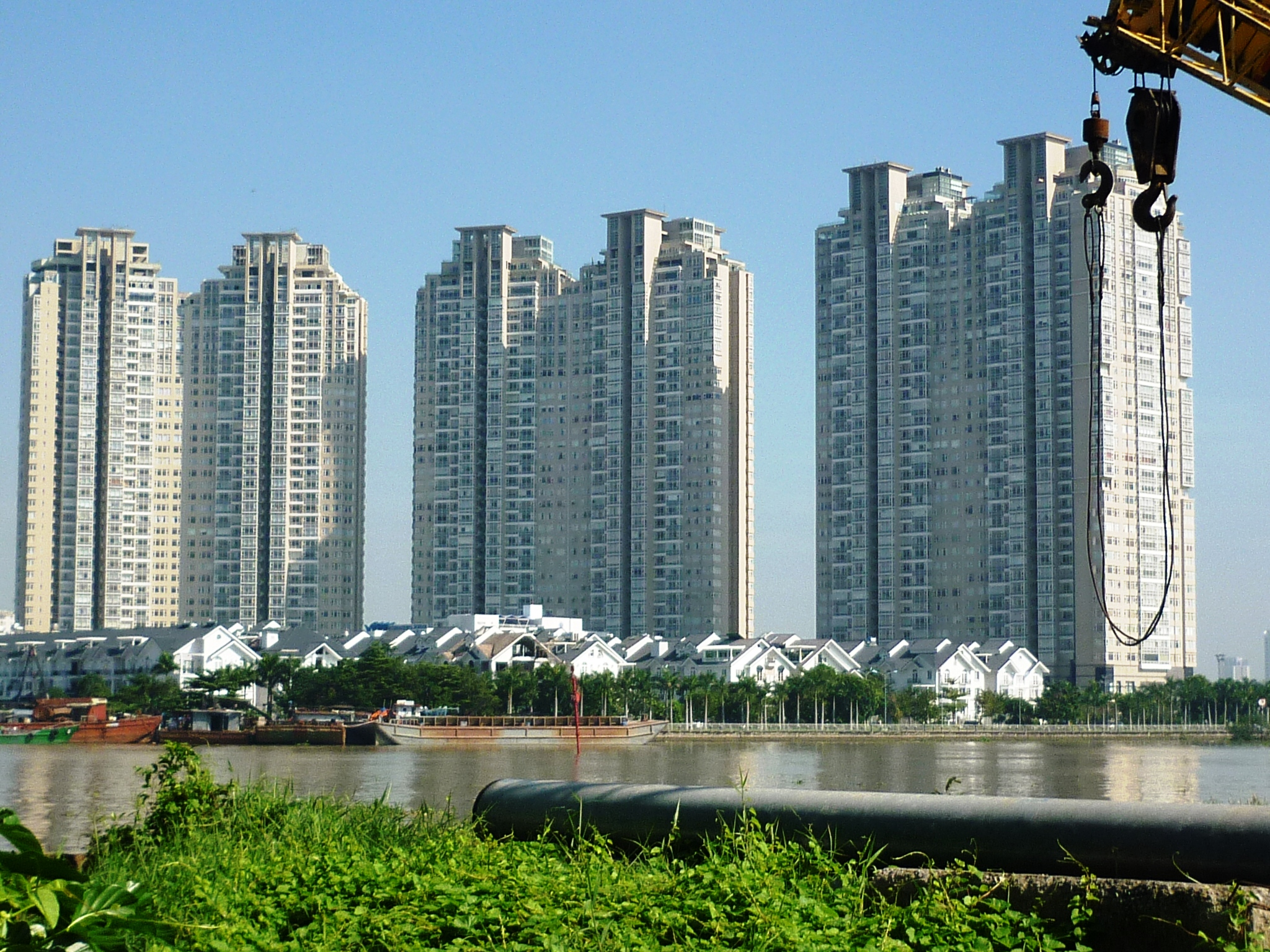
A housing project Saigon Pearl in Ho Chi Minh City

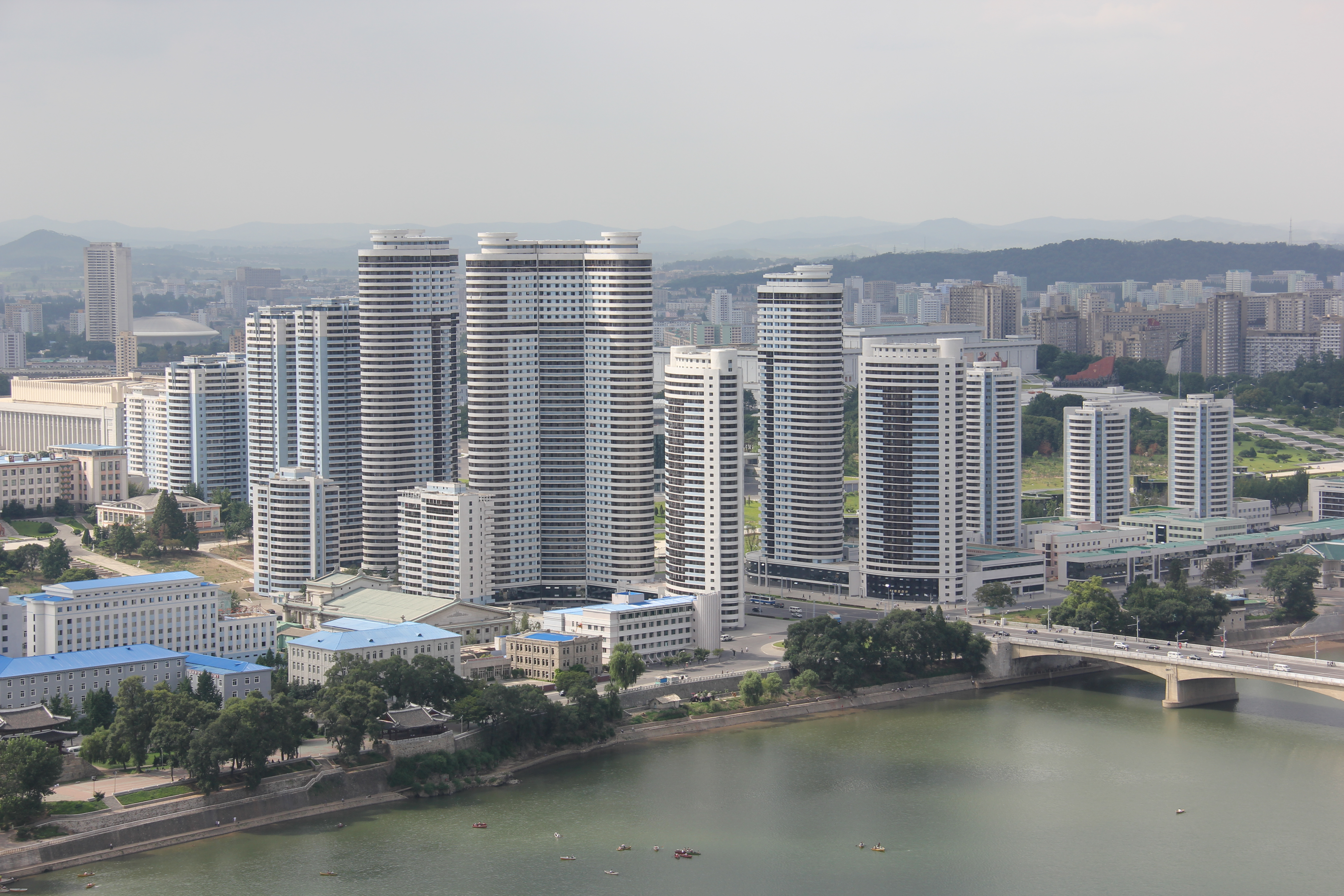
Changjon Street Apartment Complex, Pyongyang

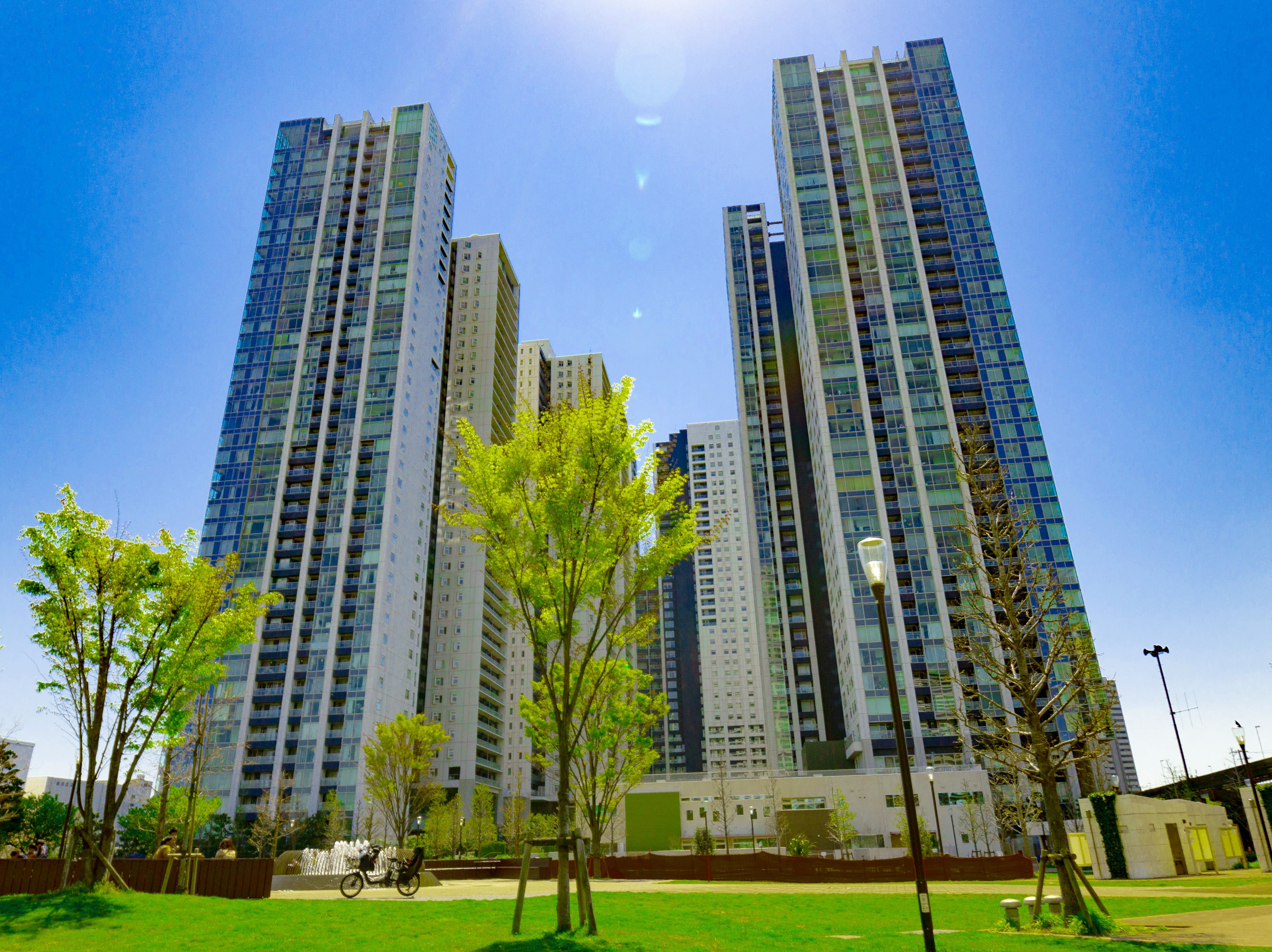
World City in Minato, Tokyo, it is categorized as "Big Scale Mansions" by the Japanese Building Standard Act

== See also ==
- Affordable housing
- Public housing
- Residential area
- Social welfare
- Subdivision (land)
- Subsidized housing
- Tract housing
- Welfare state

=== Relating to particular regions ===
- Bahria Town (Pakistan)
- Bloc (Romania)
- Danchi (Japan)
- Ghost estate (Ireland)
- HLM (France)
- Khrushchevka (Soviet Union)
- Million Programme (Sweden)
- Panelák and Sídlisko (Czech Republic and Slovakia)
- Panelház (Hungary)
- Plattenbau (Germany)
- Section 8 (United States)
- Subsidized housing in the United States
- Ugsarmal bair (Mongolia)
