= Sídlisko =

Slovak term concerning housing

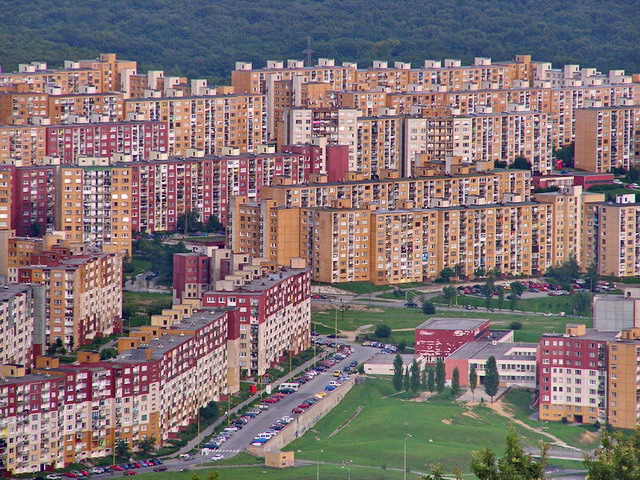
Sídlisko Ťahanovce in Košice, Slovakia.

Sídlisko is a Slovak term (Czech: sídliště) which mainly means housing complex (with civic amenities). Other terms associated with this term are housing estate, housing development, housing project, settlement, neighbourhood or borough. Although the term sídlisko is a general term, it is mostly used for housing complexes built during the socialist era in the now split Czechoslovakia (now the Czech Republic and Slovakia) containing panel houses (panelové domy, colloquially paneláky, transl. commieblocks), for which they're also known as "panelové sídliská" (panel housing complexes), colloquially "panelákové sídliská" (commieblock housing complexes).

Paneláks are the most common type of apartment buildings found in a typical sídlisko. Brick and modern apartment buildings can also be found, along with old and new houses, although they are usually not in the central part of a typical sídlisko, and are a minor part of the whole complex, if at all. Nowadays, individual paneláks in sídliskos are often checked and repaired if needed due to their age, while also being renovated, repainted from grey to vibrant colors, and generally gentrified, which is usually funded by the government, partially thanks to funds from the European Union (EU).

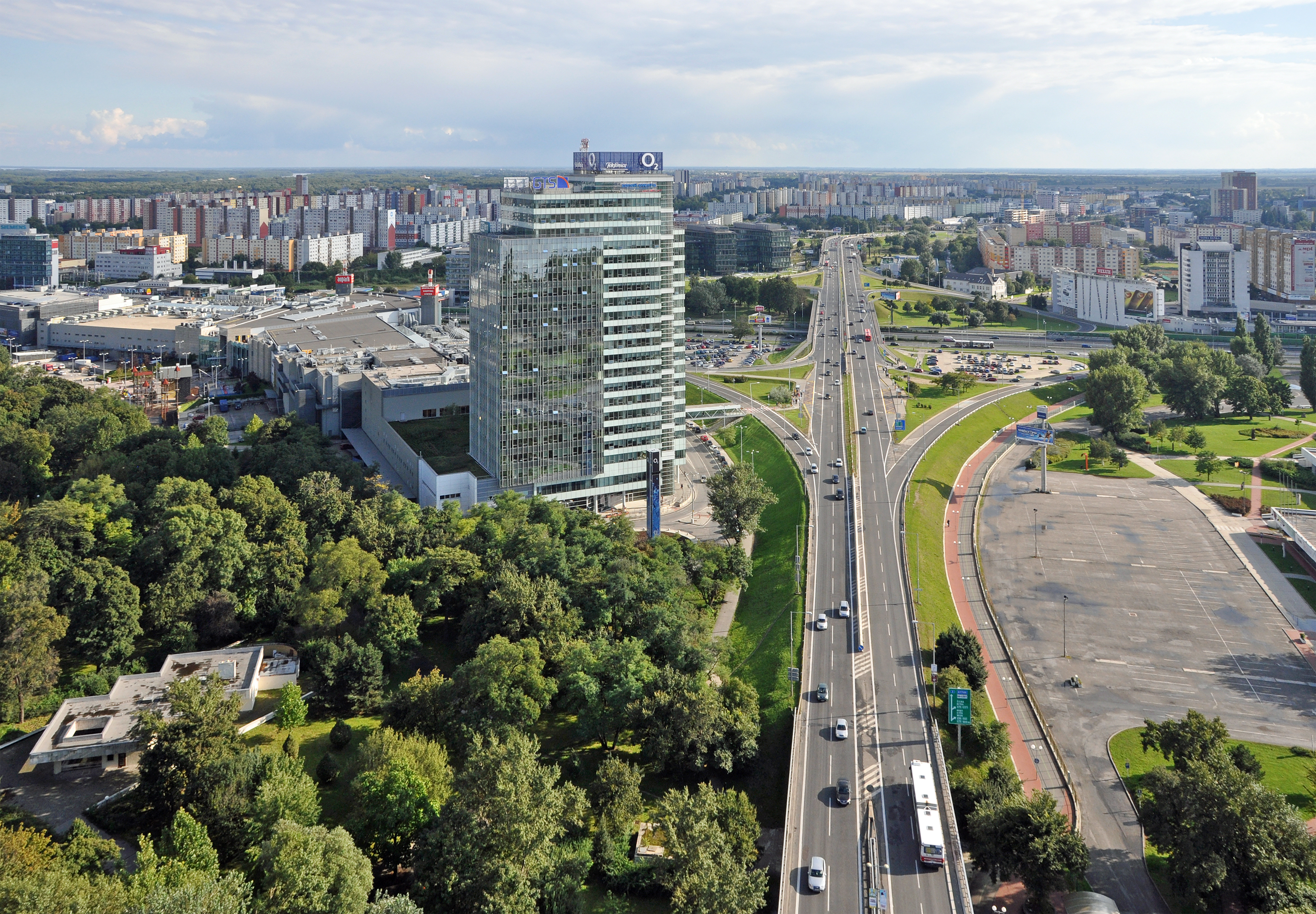
Petržalka in Bratislava, Slovakia. The largest sídlisko (panel housing complex) in Central Europe.

Sídliskos were built by the communist government of the former Czechoslovakia to provide fast and affordable housing for all people. During the Communist era, construction of large housing complexes was an important part of building plans in the country, as the government wanted to provide large quantities of affordable housing, as well as to slash costs by employing uniform designs over the whole country. They also sought to foster a "collectivistic nature" in its people.

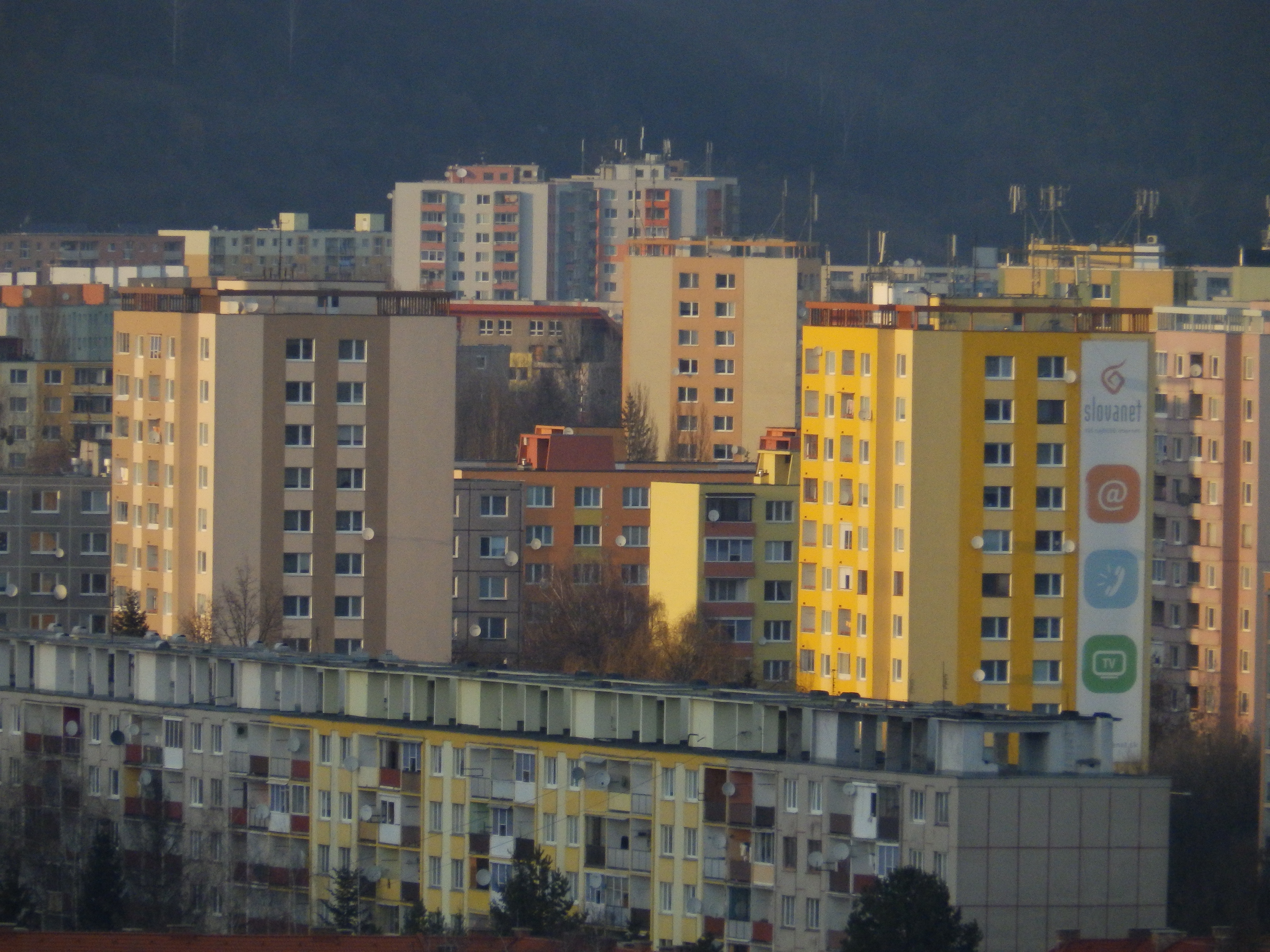
Sídlisko II & III in Prešov, Slovakia.

Sídliskos are usually located in urban areas, as direct parts of cities, usually considered as its own sections. They are usually occupied by various different people and social classes, from working class (or lower) to upper middle class (or sometimes higher), creating a social mix, with a few exceptions, such as Luník IX, which is a Roma slum.

Sídliskos are owned and managed by the government, administrative divisions, housing cooperatives, authorities, self-governing (non-profit) organizations, owners of apartments (individual blocks), and/or through public–private partnerships and such, or a combination thereof. People living in sídliskos usually own their individual apartments, mainly due to the fact that majority of the individual apartments went from being publicly owned by the state to being privately owned, as they were sold to most apartment occupants by the government for small, symbolic prices after the fall of socialism. People can also rent apartments, usually through real estate agents and private landlords, although some apartments are still owned by the state and are usually used for social housing. Prices of the apartments vary depending on the individual apartment and its qualities. Majority of people living in cities live in sídliskos, mainly because of history, tradition, availability and affordability, as well as being in convenient urban areas or close and having good civic amenities, which are also used by people who don't live in a particular sídlisko.

== See also ==
- Khrushchevka & Brezhnevka (former Soviet Union)
- Panelház (Hungary)
- Bloc (Romania)
- LPS (Germany)
- HLM (France)
- Million Programme (Sweden)
- Ugsarmal bair (Mongolia)
- Affordable housing
- Subsidized housing
- Public housing
