= HLM =

Form of low-income housing

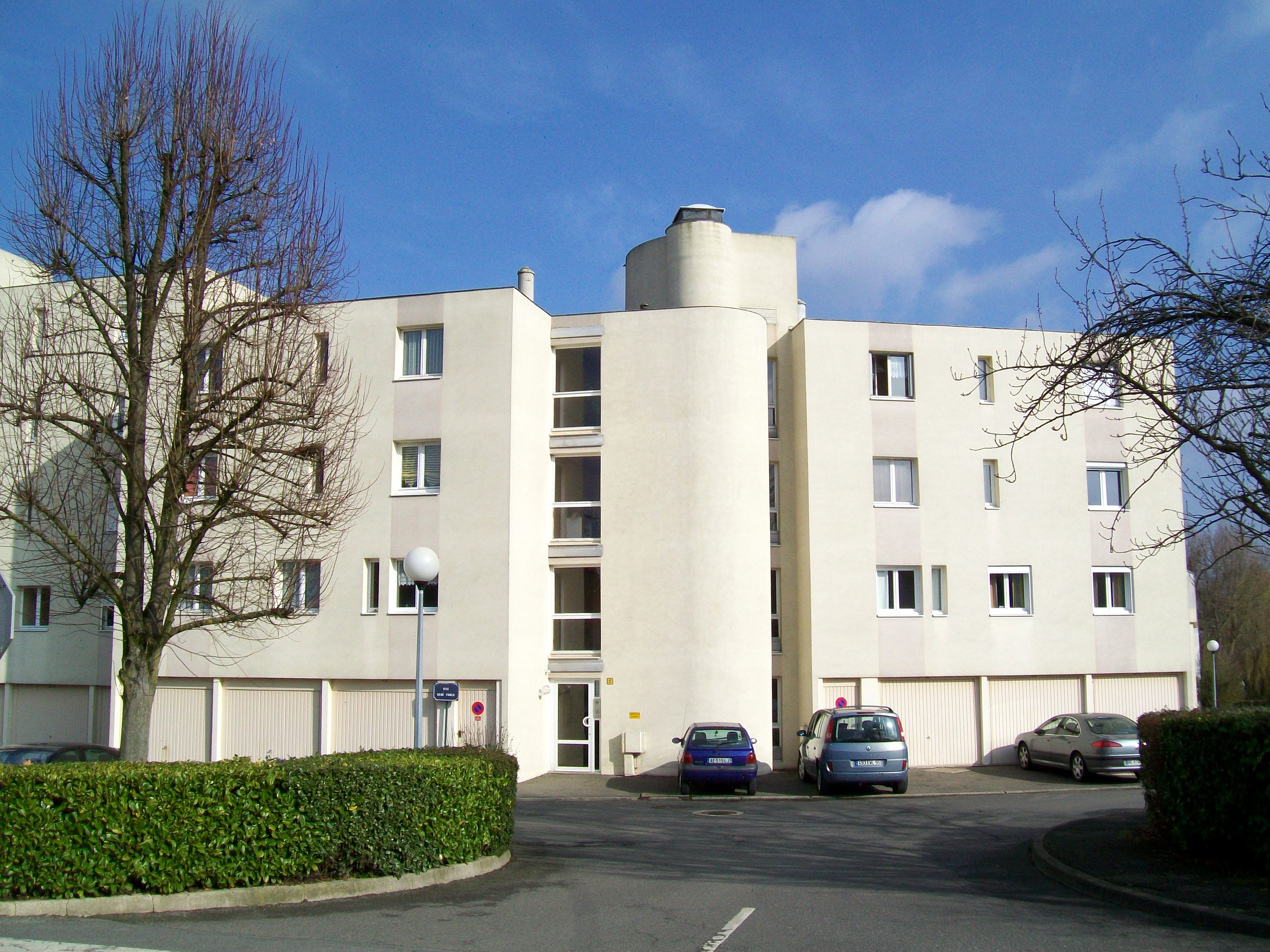
HLM of Jardin Frémin, in Survilliers. In France, 72% of HLM (95% since 2000) are houses or small buildings of 20 apartments.

An habitation à loyer modéré (HLM, pronounced [aʃ ɛl ɛm], lit. 'housing at moderate rent') is a form of low-income housing in France, Algeria, Senegal, and Quebec. It may be public or private, with rent subsidies.

HLMs constitute 16% of all housing in France. There are approximately four million such residences, housing an estimated 10 million people. The standard of living in the HLM housing projects is often the lowest in the country.

72% of French HLMs built before 2001 (and 95% of those built between 2001 and 2011) are small buildings or individual houses. The average size of buildings is 20 apartments. Construction of HLM is mainly financed by funds collected on Livret A, a type of savings account regulated by the Caisse des dépôts et consignations. In 2011, the French people have placed 280 billion euros on this type of savings account.

== History ==
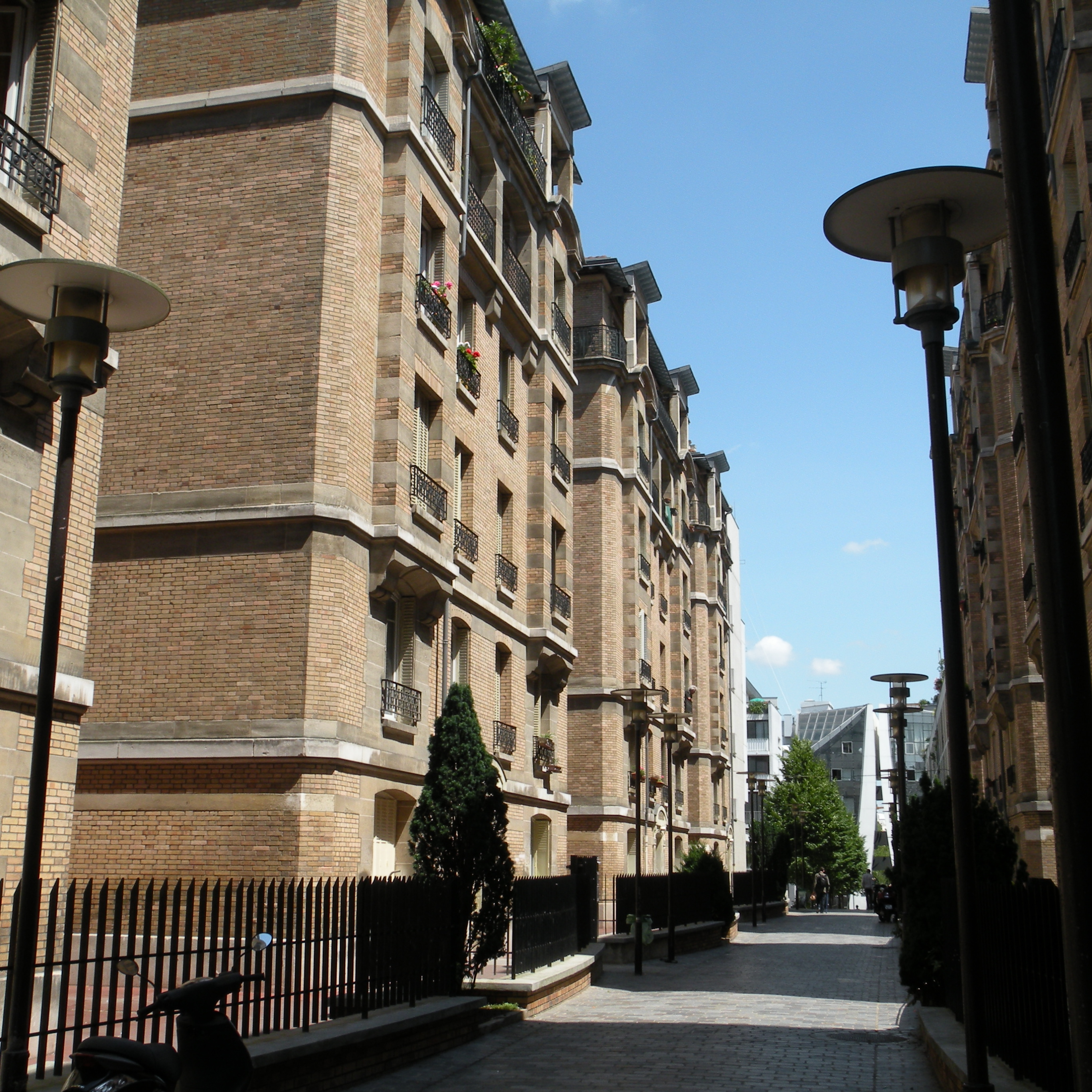
HBM of rue Jean Fautrier in the 13th arrondissement of Paris, France.

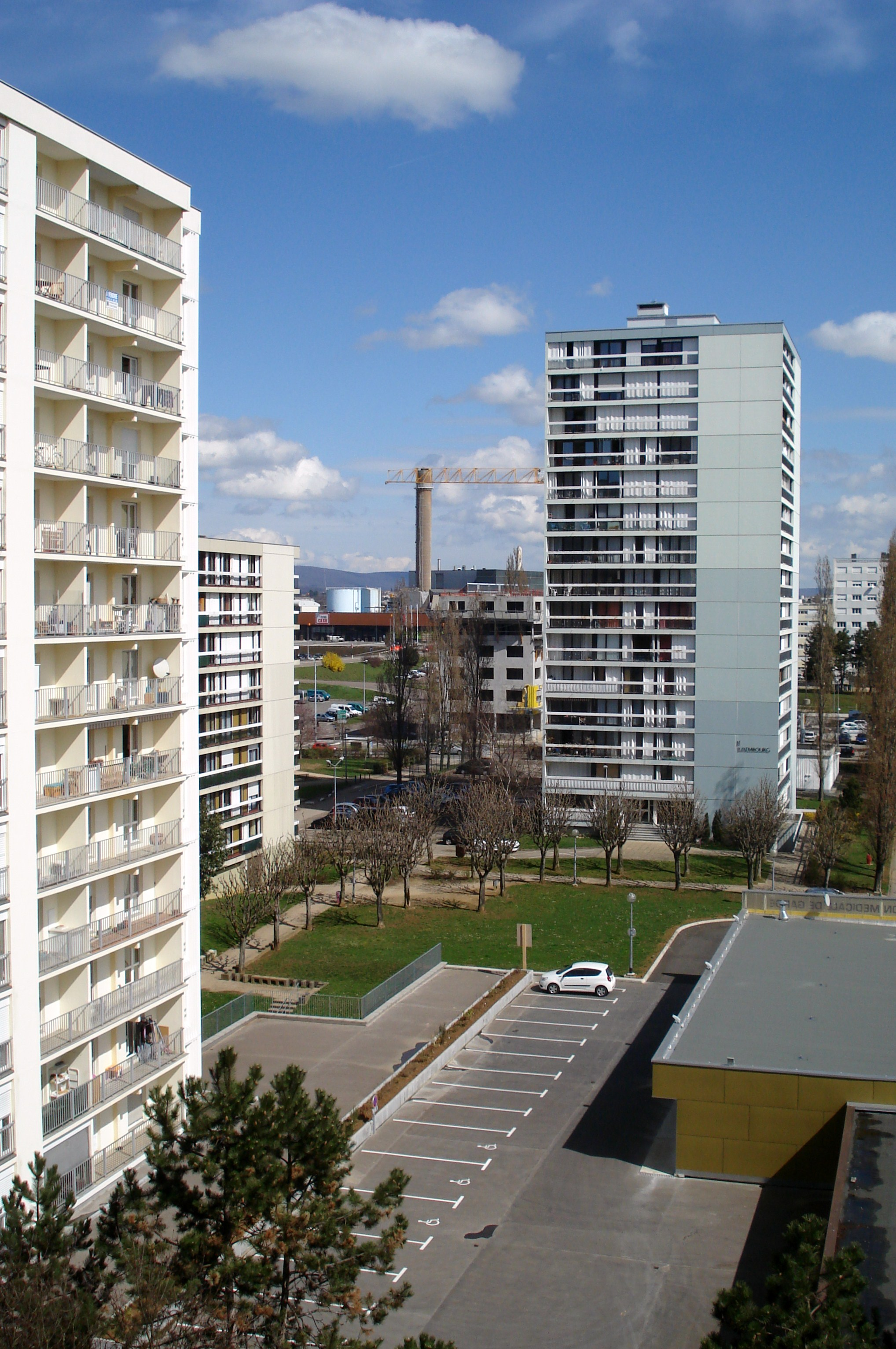
HLM in the area of Planoise, in Besançon.

In the early 1960s, “bidonvilles” housed most low-income immigrants. Bidonvilles were housing developments, commonly referred to as “shanty towns” located in the metropole with little to no running water or utilities. The largest bidonvilles were located in Champigny with the majority population being Portuguese immigrants and a similar number in Nanterre with the majority population being Algerian immigrants. The Movement for France (MPF), which was a political party, pushed for the betterment of living conditions initially stating that social demands such as the need for shelter were basic and thus universal. MPF’s agenda slowly changed from housing being a universal need, to an exclusive right for citizens and the working class. The new HLM buildings improved living conditions; however, social commentaries coined the term Sarcellitis which is used to describe living in a depressing environment. The dramatic change from living in bidonvilles would overlook the unsightly buildings, but the environmental challenges (via police brutally) would soon follow in the coming years within the newly formed HLM communities. The French government hoped that by sheltering low-income populations, it would bring the standard of living up, but it instead stratified a hierarchical system. Surveillance of immigrant groups (in HLMs) were issued by government officials to procure cultural information on immigrant communities so as to better acclimate them into French society. This racially motivated approach was perpetuated by the Fifth Republic officials because they believed the immigrant communities were incapable of living in France. The lack of assimilation was a result of inequality and discrimination thus keeping immigrants in the HLM suburbs.

The low level of construction during and between the two world wars, the rural exodus that had started to take place in France (directed mainly at Île-de-France, the Paris region) and the baby boom, contributed to a deficit of an estimated four million residences. Eugène Claudius-Petit, the Minister for Reconstruction and Urbanisation, promoted a scheme of massive construction of socially subsidised residences to address this problem. The new system took its foundations from the HBM (habitation à bon marché – "inexpensive housing") system, which had been created in 1889 and financed mainly by charitable sources rather than the state.

The level of social construction did not significantly rise until minister Pierre Courant launched an ambitious plan in 1956, warranted by the increased rate of immigration from France's former colonies. Courant's plan had the goal of construction of at least 240,000 residences each year, and it was an unexpected success: from 1956 on, there were more than 300,000 new residences built annually, with a good number of them HLM. In 1964, there were 95,000 new HLM apartments. The residences were often constructed in large complexes, by le chemin de grue ("the way of the crane"). The new, large apartment buildings were perfectly rectangular, to allow a crane to roll along a track and place components on both sides of the building simultaneously, saving both time and effort.

The greatest increase in the number of HLMs came in the late 1960s and early 1970s, when many planned communities, or ZUP (zones à urbaniser en priorité: "priority urbanisation zones") were constructed. They were built mostly in the suburbs of Paris. A total of 195 ZUP were created, producing over two million new, mostly HLM, residences.

The emphasis shifted to improving the standard of living in the residences already in existence. In 1968, for example, only 41% of the HLM apartments had toilet and sanitary facilities. By the end of the 1970s, the figure had risen to about 80%. New HLM sites, with more rooms per residence, were built in smaller cities and towns, and numerous programmes were launched to combat poverty, unemployment and delinquency in ZUP communities. In 2001, each HLM residence had, on average, 2.4 persons living in it (compared to 3.2 in 1954), four rooms (three in 1954), and 96% of all HLM apartments had toilet and sanitary facilities, compared to only 10% in 1954.

According to a study by the Banque des Territoires in 2025, building new or renovated social housing seems impossible given the budgetary equation in France.

== Statistics ==
=== France ===
Units of HLMS (including vacants)
Year	1955	1961	1967	1973	1978	1984	1988	1992	1996	2002	2006	2011	2019 (estimate)
Numbers (in millions)	0.3	0.7	1.2	2	2.6	3	3.1	3.3	3.5	3.7	3.9	4.1	4.6

Average monthly rent over time in HLMs
Year	1984	1990	1996	2002	2008	2012	2014	2018
Euros	€120	€190	€260	€290	€360	€380	€390	€390

Percentage of group households in HLMs out of total group households
Nationality of head of household	1990	2018
Nationality of head of household	%	%
French	13.7%	13%
Foreign	28%	–
Spanish	20.5%	13%
Italian	14.2%	10%
Portuguese	24.8%	15%
European Community/European Union	18.4%	9%
Other European	–	24%
Algerians	43.4%	49%
Moroccans	44.3%	45%
Tunisians	34.4%	38%
Other Africans	36.6%	48%
South East Asians	43.4%	–
Turks	45.1%	38%
Others	15.3%	20%

== See also ==
- Affordable housing
- Housing estate
- Public housing
- Subsidized housing

=== Specific to France ===
- Banlieue (France)
- Ville nouvelle ("new town" on the French Wikipedia)

=== Relating to other regions ===
- Housing Development Board (Singapore)
- Khrushchevka (Soviet Union)
- Large-panel-system building (Germany)
- Million Programme (Sweden)
- Panelák and Sídlisko (Czech Republic and Slovakia)
- Panelház (Hungary)
- Public housing in the United Kingdom
- Section 8 (USA)
- Subsidized housing in the United States
