= Avas =

Hill and city part in Miskolc, Hungary

Coordinates: 48°06′N 20°47′E

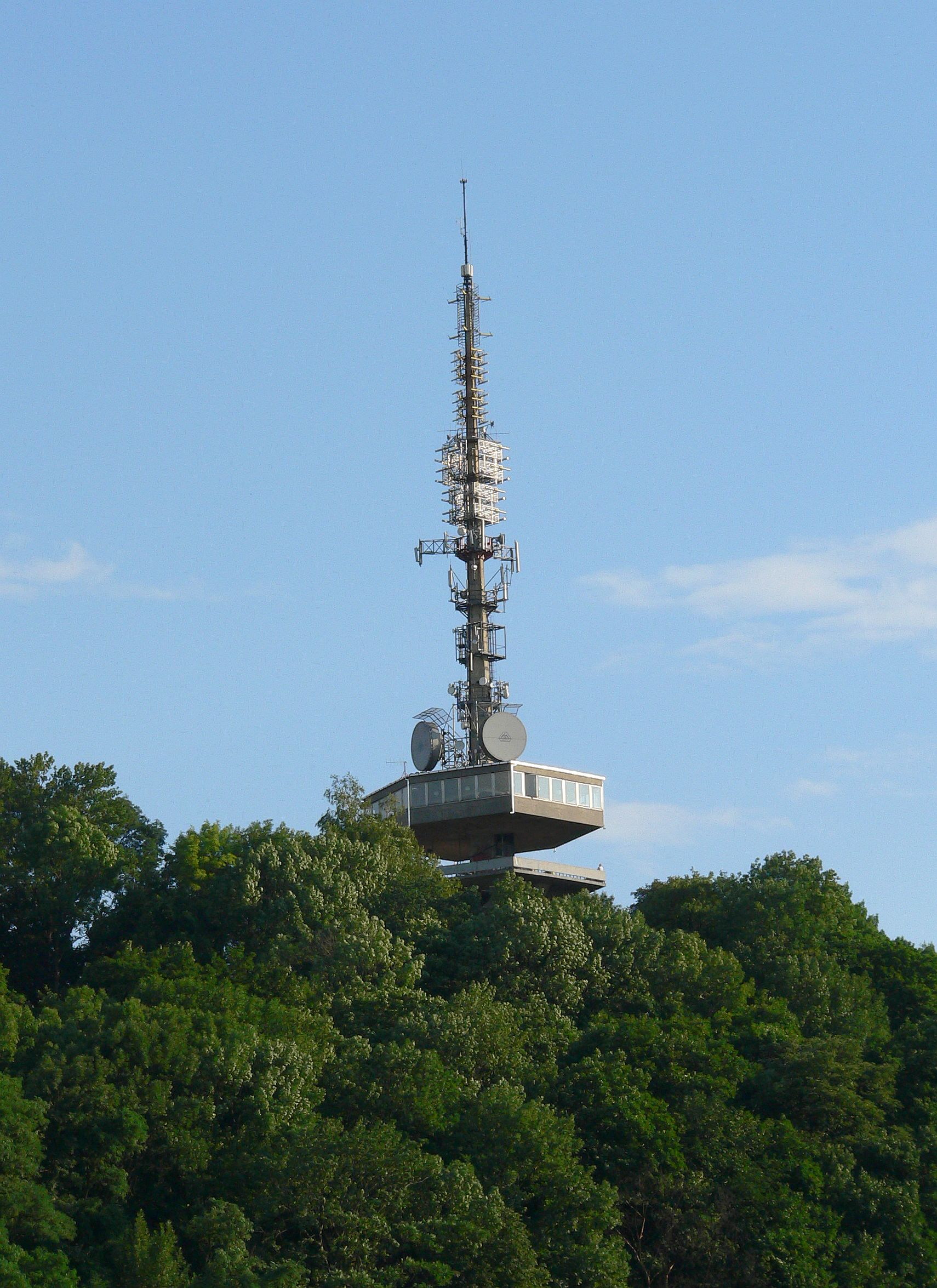
The TV tower

The Avas is a hill of volcanic origin in Miskolc, Hungary. Its top (234 m above sea level, 104 m above the city) is the highest point of Miskolc proper (although other parts, annexed to the city later, lie higher up in the Bükk mountains). On the top stands a TV tower with observation deck which is a former symbol of the city and provides a nice panorama.

The name of the hill is an archaic Hungarian word meaning "forbidden". It was named that at a time it was forbidden for shepherds to graze their herds there because the old wine cellars threatened with caving in.

In the early 20th century several prehistoric artefacts were found in the Avas, proving that a people belonging to the Neolithic Szeleta culture lived here. (The culture itself was named after Szeleta Cave, in Lillafüred, where many important archaeological finds were found.)

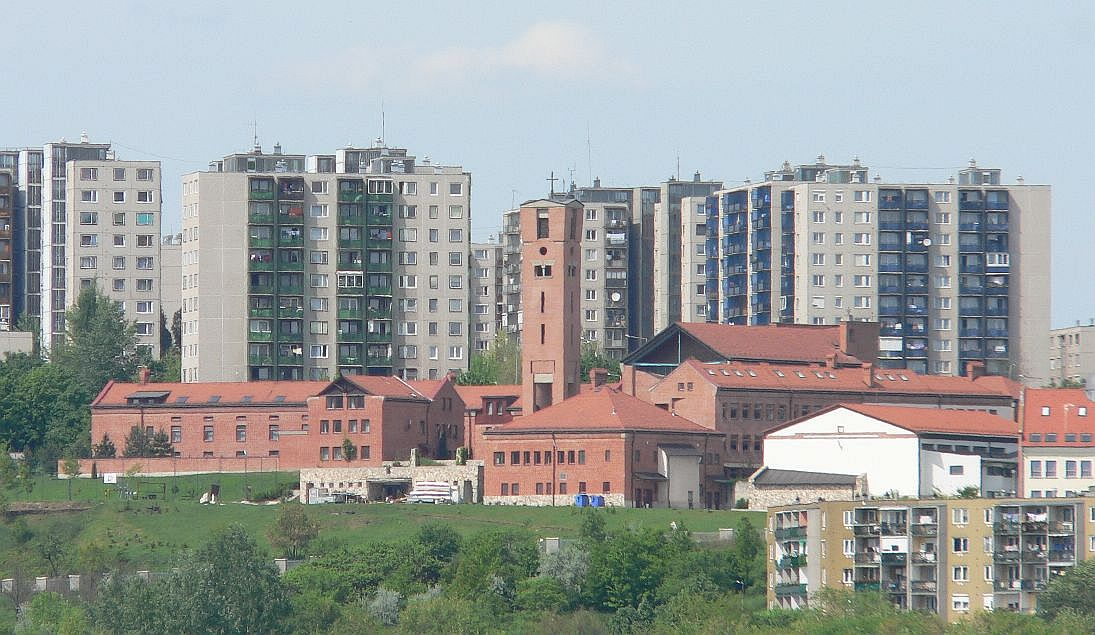
The Jesuit secondary school and church surrounded by concrete buildings

The limestone caves of Avas, that were once used by prehistoric men, are now used as wine cellars; the narrow, winding streets give a Mediterranean atmosphere to this part of Avas Hill.

On the northern part of the hill, close to downtown Erzsébet Square, stands the Gothic Protestant Church of Avas, the oldest building of Miskolc proper (the other oldest building is the Castle of Diósgyőr) and its belfry (16th century). There are also several wine cellars dug in sandstone nearby, in the so-called Kis-Avas ("Little Avas") district.

The TV tower is 72 meters high and was built in 1963. The previous tower was made of wood and was designed by Bálint Szeghalmi, who also designed the Wooden Church; it was destroyed by Soviet soldiers during the revolution in 1956.

The southern part of Avas, also called Avas-South, is where the largest housing estate of the city stands, with 10-storey Socialist-style concrete blocks of flats providing homes for about one-third of the city's population. The district has five primary and four secondary schools, two post offices and a police station.
