= Gothic Protestant Church of Avas =

Coordinates: 48.1013°N 20.7787°E

Reformed Church of Miskolc-Avas
- Miskolc-avasi református templom (Hungarian)

- Location within Hungary
- Location: Miskolc
- Country: Hungary
- Denomination: Reformed
- Previous denomination: Catholic
- Website: www.reformatus-avas.shp.hu

History
- Founded: 13th century

Architecture
- Functional status: Active
- Architectural type: Gothic

Administration
- Diocese: Cistibiscan Church District
- Parish: Reformed Congregation of Miskolc-Avas

The Reformed Church of Miskolc-Avas (Hungarian: Miskolc-avasi református templom), Gothic Reformed Church of Avas (Hungarian: Avasi gótikus református templom), Gothic Protestant Church of Avas or just simply Church of Avas (Hungarian: Avasi templom), is a 13th-century Protestant church in the centre of the city of Miskolc in northern Hungary. It was originally a Catholic church dedicated to St. Stephen; it has been a Reformed church since the 16th century.

== History ==
It was built in the 13th century as a small, Romanesque style church. Later, when the church had become too small for the people of Miskolc, they decided to completely rebuild it. The demolition of the church began in 1402. The new Gothic octagonal colonnade was erected against the wall of the Romanesque church and the new church interior was formed with the construction of the side aisles. The entire reconstruction took nearly a hundred years, at the end of which a modern, three-nave hall church was built.

The first Protestant Reformer to arrive in Miskolc was the “Hungarian Luther,” Mátyás Bíró Dévai. As early as 1543, he was preaching from the pulpit of St. Stephen’s Parish Church in Avas, which was Catholic at the time.

In 1544, during the Ottoman occupation of Hungary the Turks set the church on fire. Because it became Protestant church, the Catholic owner of the Diósgyőr estate, Borbála Fánchy, didn't give permission to use the wood from the nearby forests to rebuild the church, and it was rebuilt only more than twenty years later.

The third major event was an earthquake that hit Miskolc on October 15, 1834. As a result, the church's eastern wall sustained serious damage; its restoration was very costly and lasted until the end of World War I.

== Organs ==
The Church of Avas has two organs: the Angster Organ, located on the west side of the church, and the Váradi Organ, located on the side of the former sanctuary. The acoustics of the church is very good, and concerts are held quite often.

Belfry

The original organ of the church was built by József Angster in 1895. The instrument, which had deteriorated over time, was modernized in 1971 and underwent a complete restoration in 2016. As a gift of the City of Miskolc, another instrument, the Váradi organ was also built and dedicated on June 4, 2006.

== Belfry ==
The belfry was built in 1557. The bells have played a version of the Westminster Chimes every 15 minutes since 1941. Because of the noisy traffic, the chimes cannot be heard from too far away, however it is one of the best known sounds of the city. The National Theatre of Miskolc signals the beginning of a play with this sound.

There are two bells in the tower. The larger one, the 750-kilogram Miklós Bell, was cast in 1923, and the smaller one, the 250-kilogram Johanka Bell, was cast in 1926.

== Cemetery ==
The church is surrounded by a cemetery, where many famous sons of the city were buried, including the politicians Bertalan Szemere and László Palóczy, members of the Latabár actor dynasty, and the father of the poet Mihály Tompa.

== Gallery ==
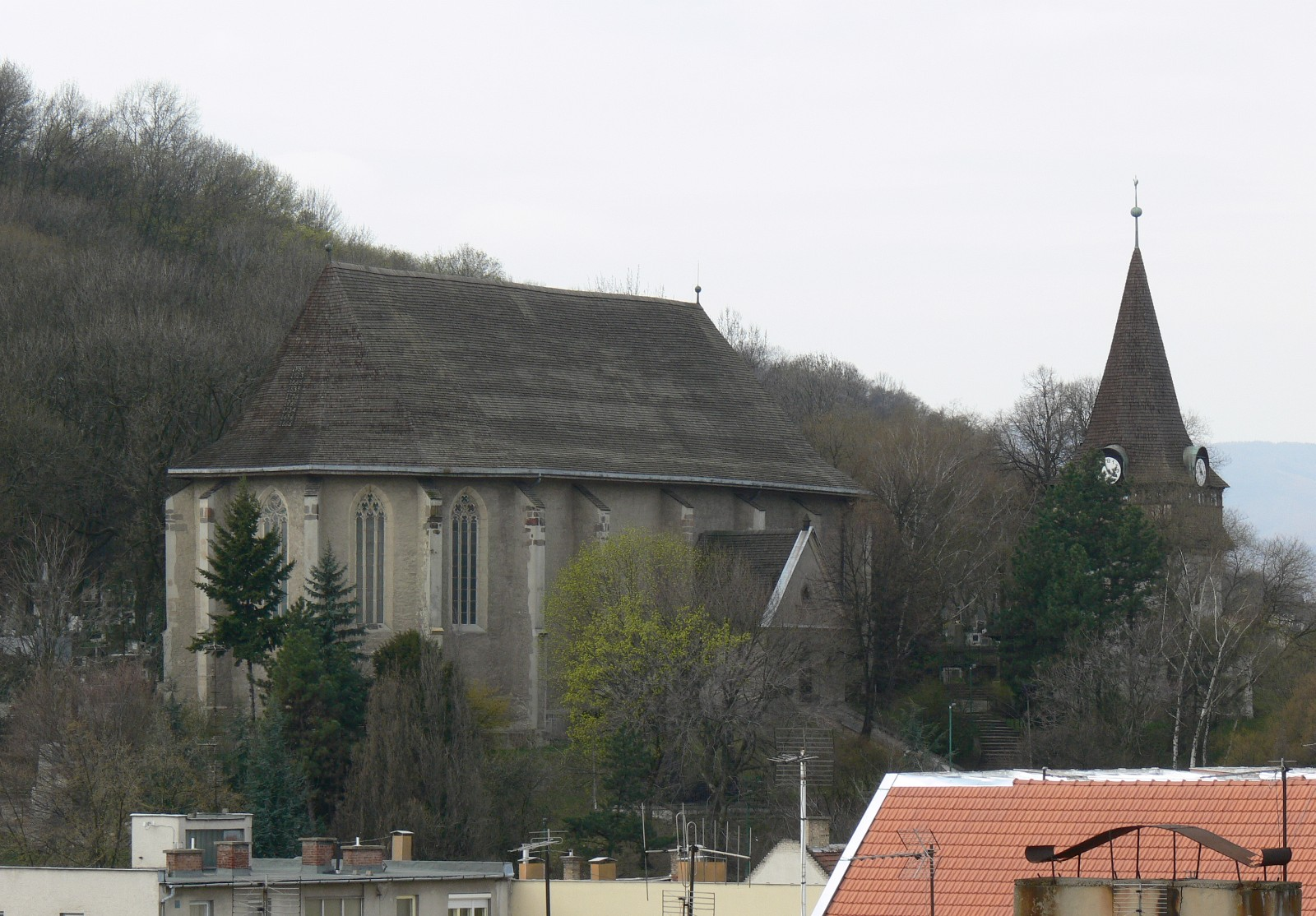
Back of the church

Belfry

Church service

Pulpit

Cemetery
