= Ugsarmal bair =

Mongolian term for Soviet panel buildings

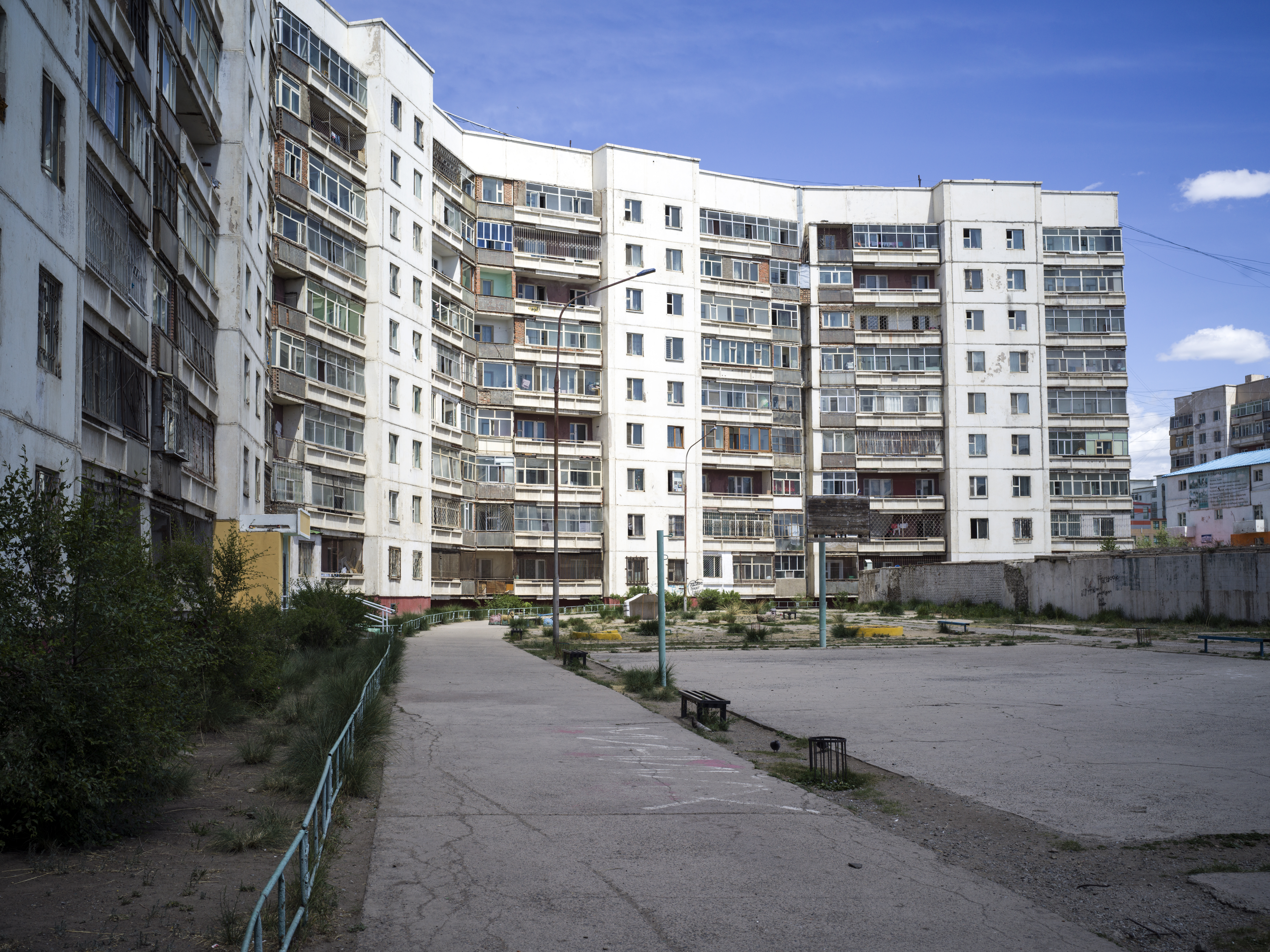
White nine-story tall panel buildings in Bayanzürkh, Ulaanbaatar

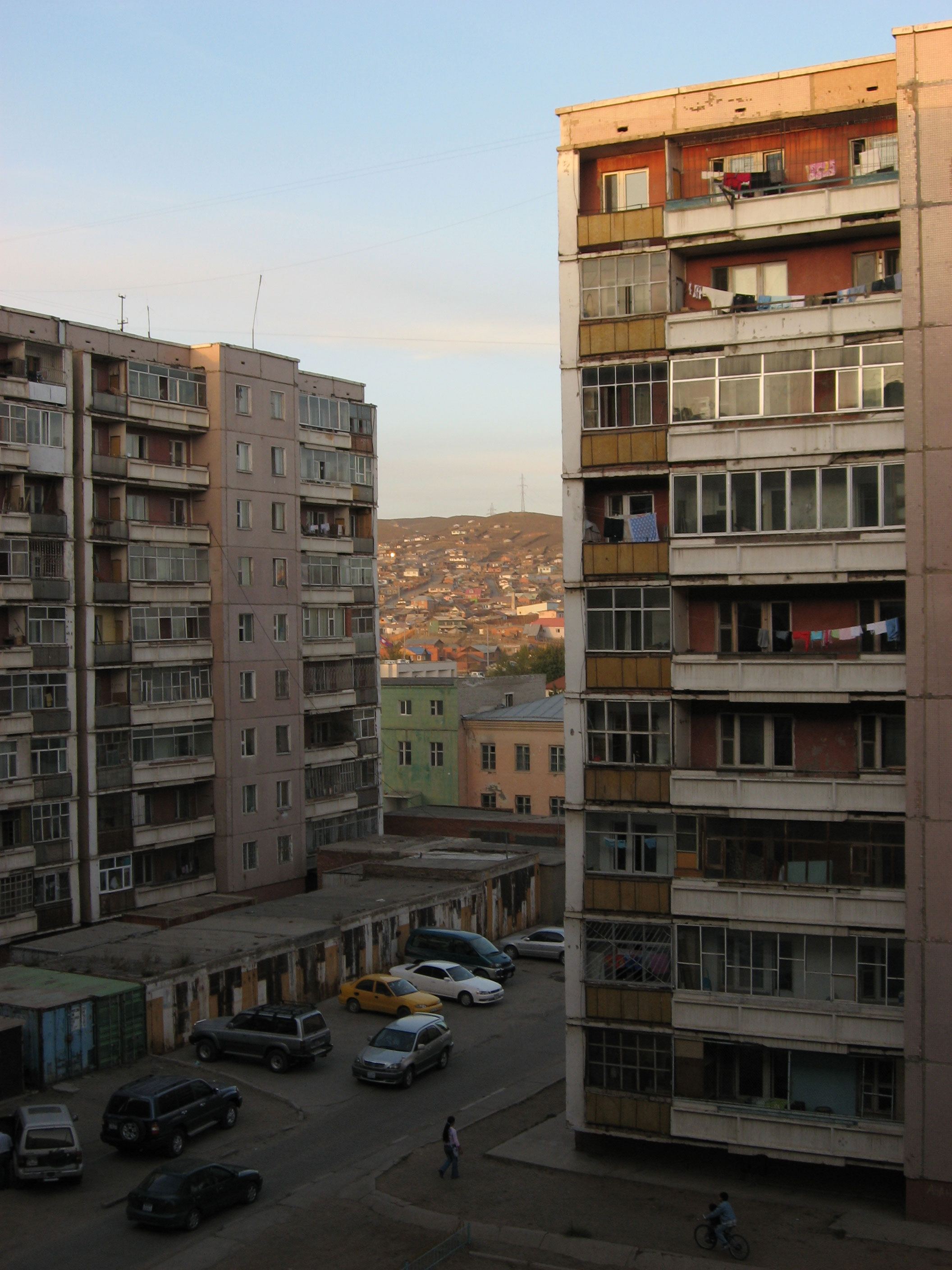
Brown nine-story panel buildings in Songinokhairkhan, Ulaanbaatar

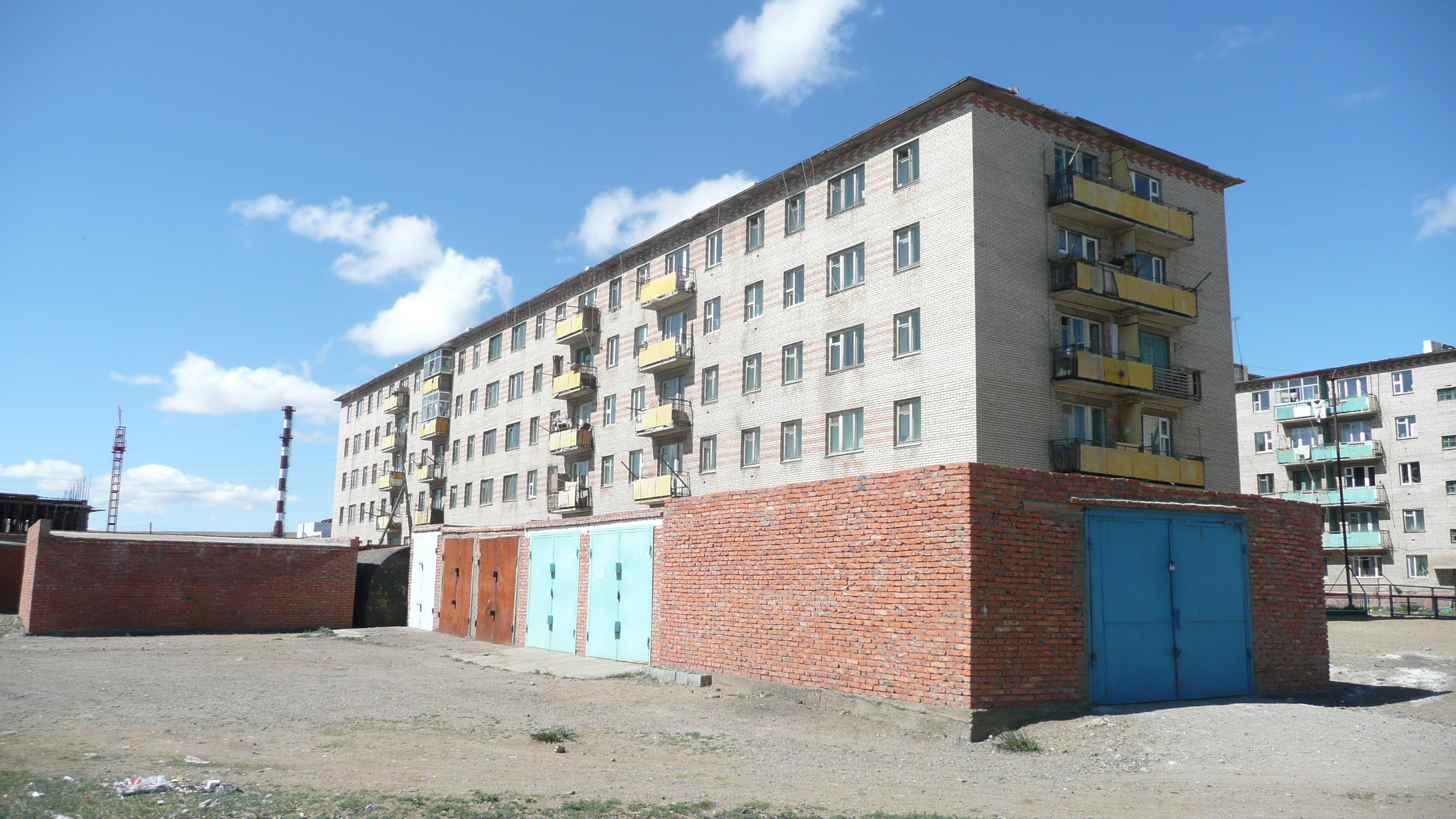
Four-story Khrushchevka in Nalaikh, Ulaanbaatar

Ugsarmal bair (Mongolian: Угсармал байр, lit. 'assembled building'), or just Ugsarmal, is the Mongolian term for prefabricated high-rise panel buildings. Built in the 1960s and 1970s with Soviet funding, most ugsarmal building designs are similar to those of Brezhnevkas in the Soviet Union.

Majority of the buildings offered only small flats to most inhabitants. They were made to cheap quality standards while minimising the visual beauty of the buildings. At the same time, they supplied a large share of Mongolia's population with flats equipped with modern amenities (tap hot & cold water, in-flat sanitation, central heating), which at the time were still relatively rare in the country.

In the capital city, Ulaanbaatar, there are a total of 1077 ugsarmal panel buildings built between 1965 and 2000. Of the 1077 ugsarmal buildings, 34 of them are twelve-story, 263 of them are five-story, and the remaining 780 are nine-story tall. A study conducted in 2014 found that 45,462 households live in ugsarmal buildings.

Ugsarmals in Ulaanbaatar, Erdenet, and Darkhan are often high-rises, while those in the aimag centers usually have only four floors. Public flats in Mongolia, including Ugsarmals, were privatized in the early 1990s after the 1990 Democratic Revolution.

== Equivalents in other countries ==
The term Ugsarmal bair refers specifically to Soviet panel buildings in Mongolia. However, similar buildings (Plattenbau) were built in other Communist countries and some Western countries.

Eastern Bloc housing

- Khrushchevka (USSR)
- Brezhnevka (USSR)
- Panelák (Czechoslovakia)
- Panelház (Hungarian People's Republic)
- Large-panel-system building (East Germany)
- Systematization (Romanian People's Republic)

Other countries

- Million Programme (Sweden)
- Tower blocks (United Kingdom)

== See also ==
- Urban planning in communist countries
