= Panelház =

Hungarian term for concrete block flats

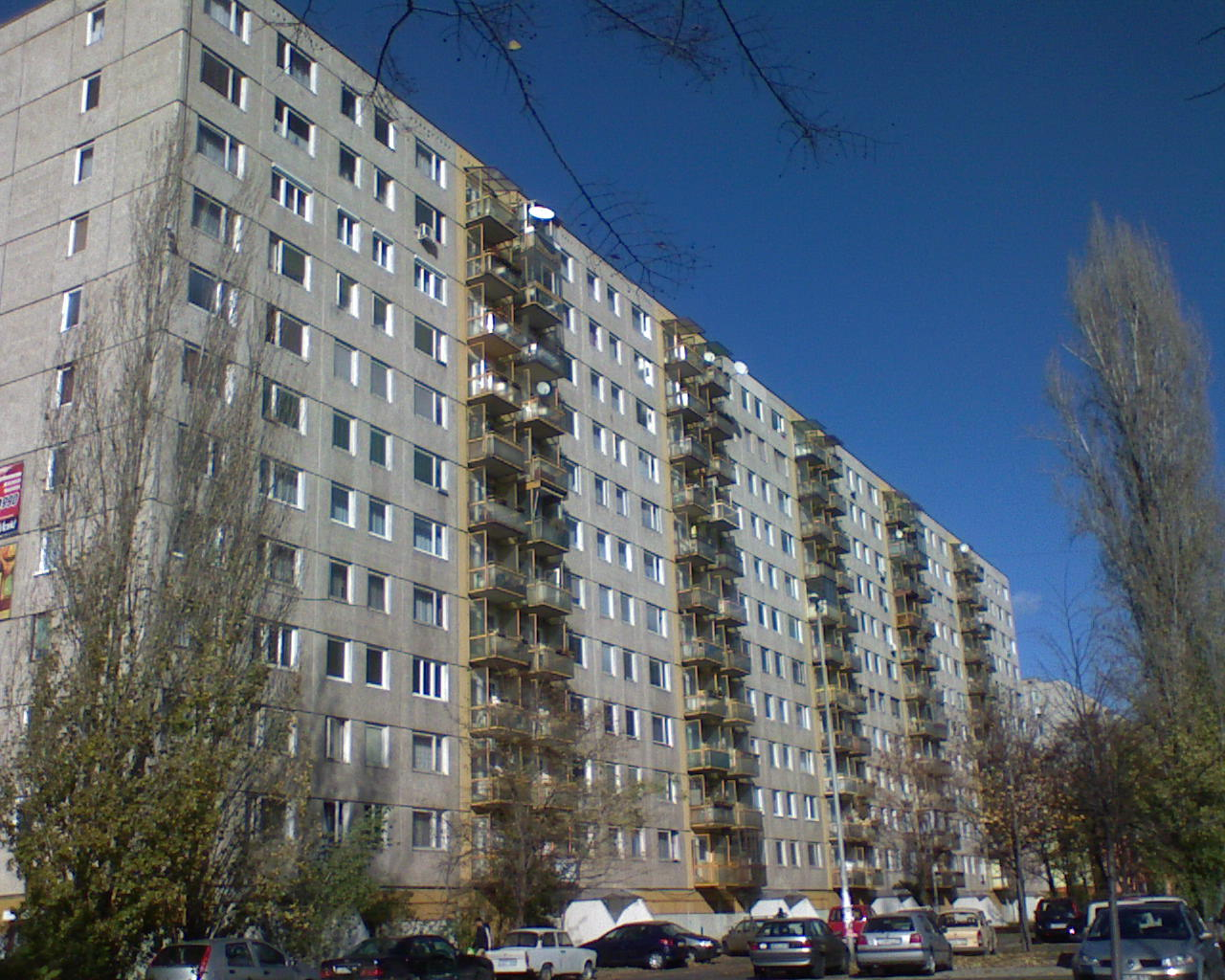
Typical 10-storey large-panel system building in Budapest-Kispest (built by the BHK III.)

Panelház (Hungarian pronunciation: [ˈpɒnɛlɦaːz], often shortened to panel) is a Hungarian term for a type of concrete block of flats (panel buildings), built in the People's Republic of Hungary and other Eastern Bloc countries. They are also known as Plattenbau in German, Panelák in Czech and Slovak, Blok in Polish, and Bloc in Romanian.

It was the main urban housing type in the Socialist era, which still dominates the Hungarian cityscapes.

According to the 2011 census, there were 829,177 panel apartments in Hungary (18.9% of the dwellings) that were home to 1,741,577 people (17.5% of the total population). Panelház are not the only type of block of flats in Hungary; as of 2025, 26.5% of Hungarians lived in flats (according to data from Eurostat).

== History ==
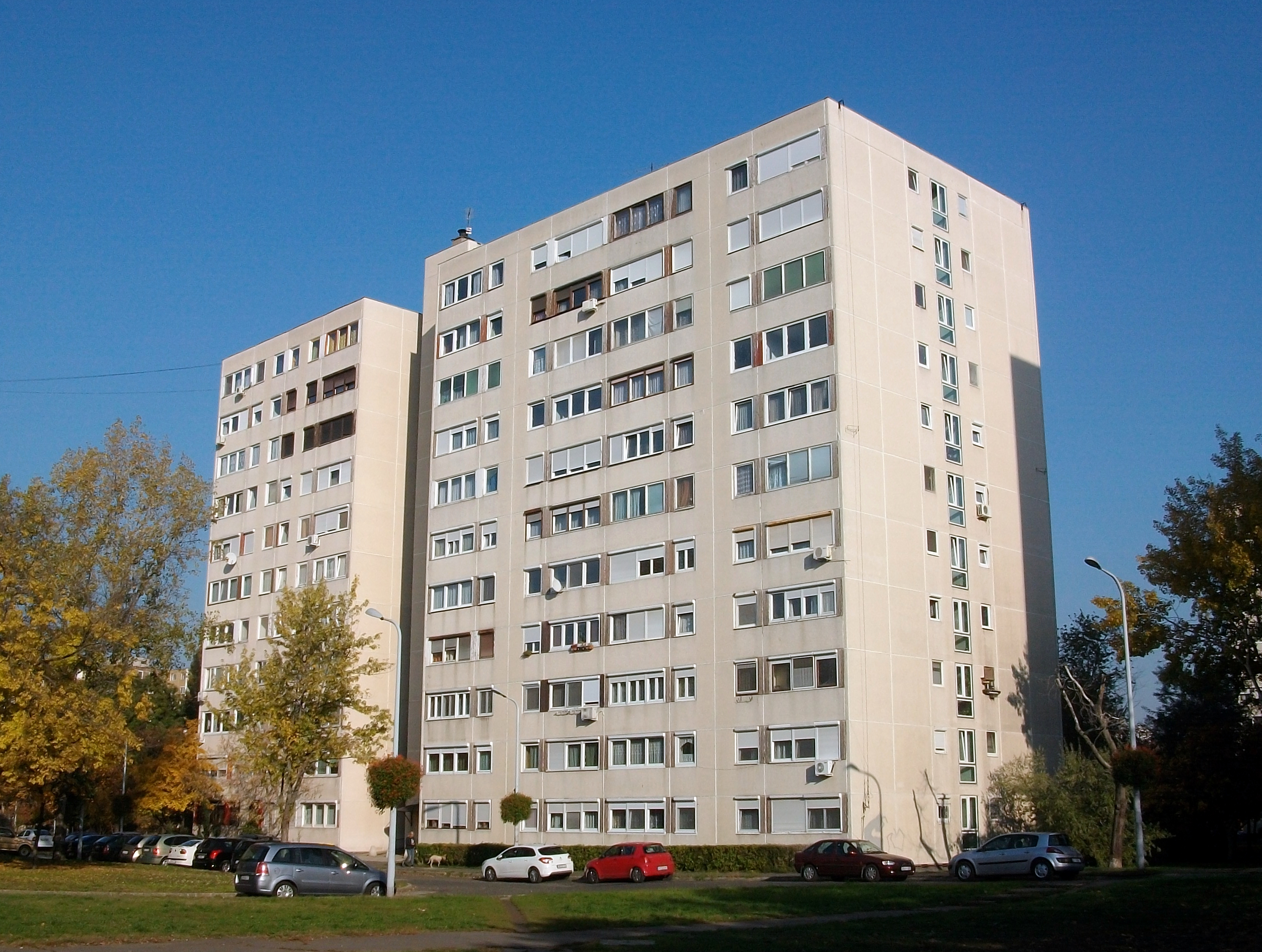
Larsen-Nielsen-type building in Budapest-Újpest (built by the BHK II.)

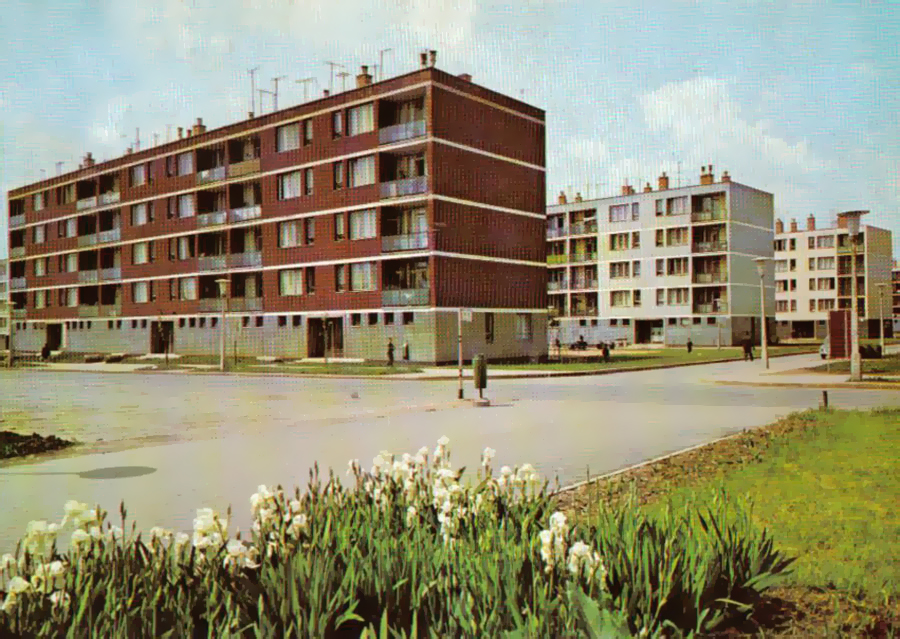
Precast concrete buildings in Gyöngyös (1974)

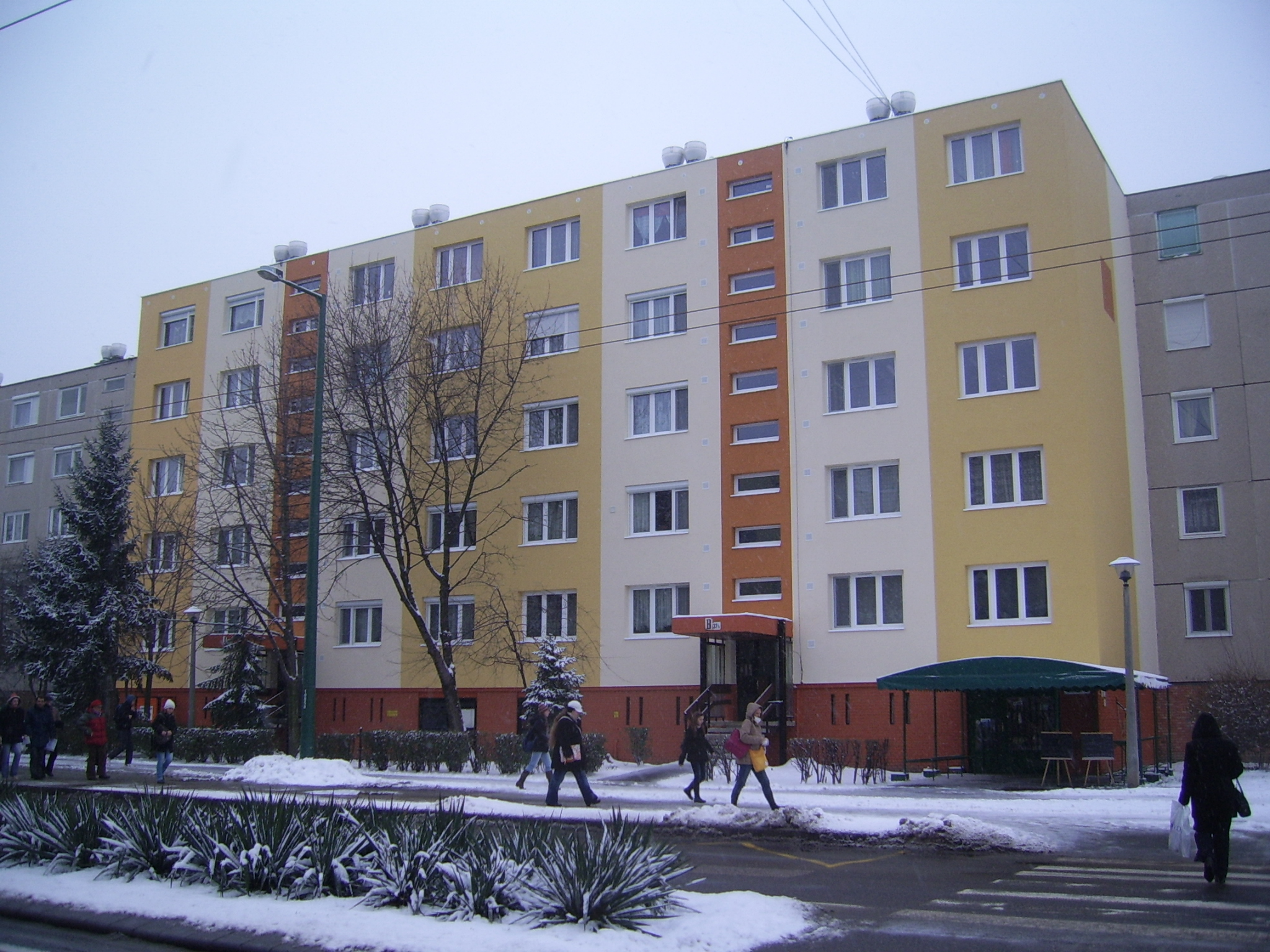
Renovated large-panel system building in Szeged

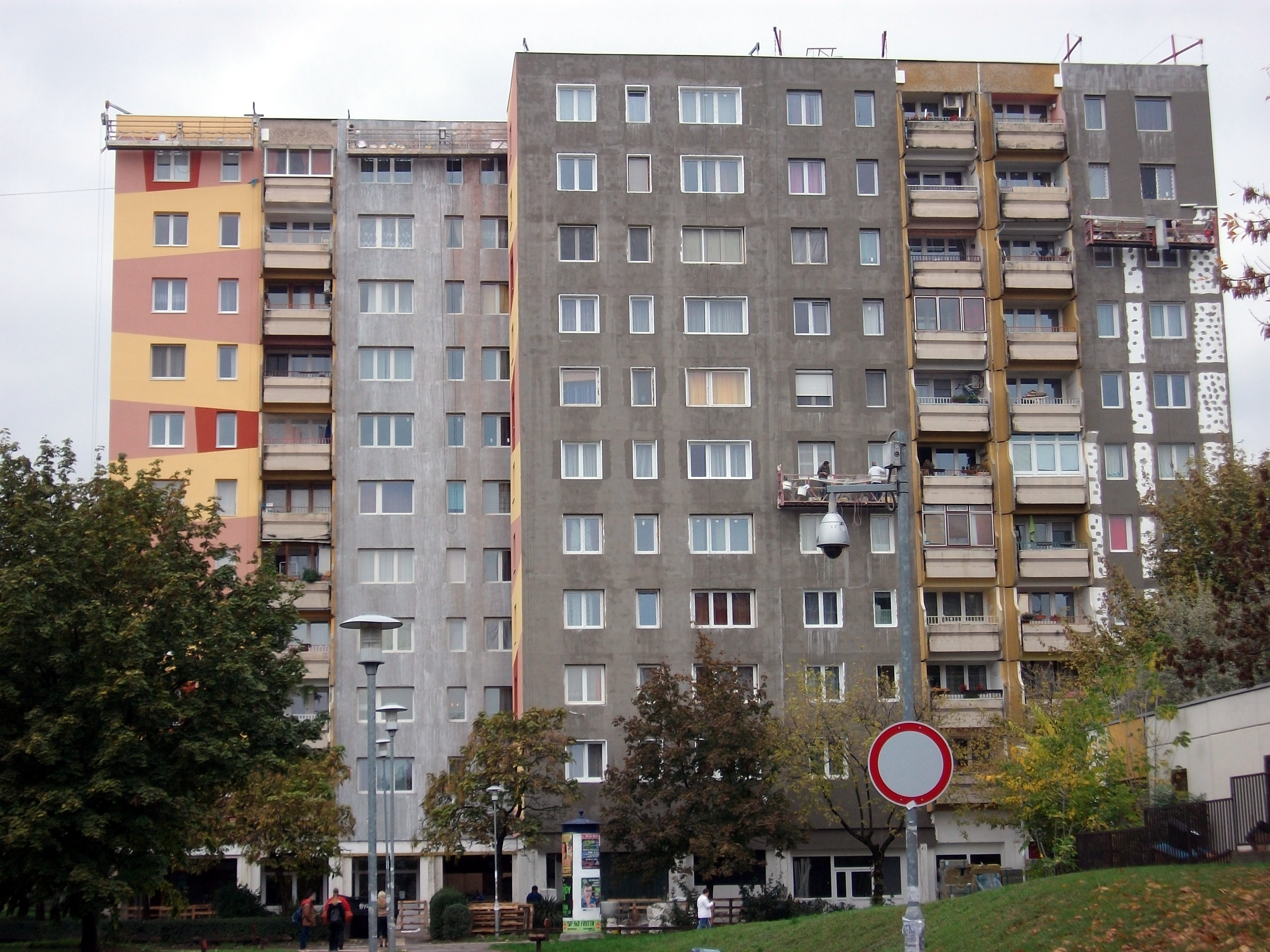
Panel building under renovation in Budapest-Békásmegyer (built by the BHK I.)

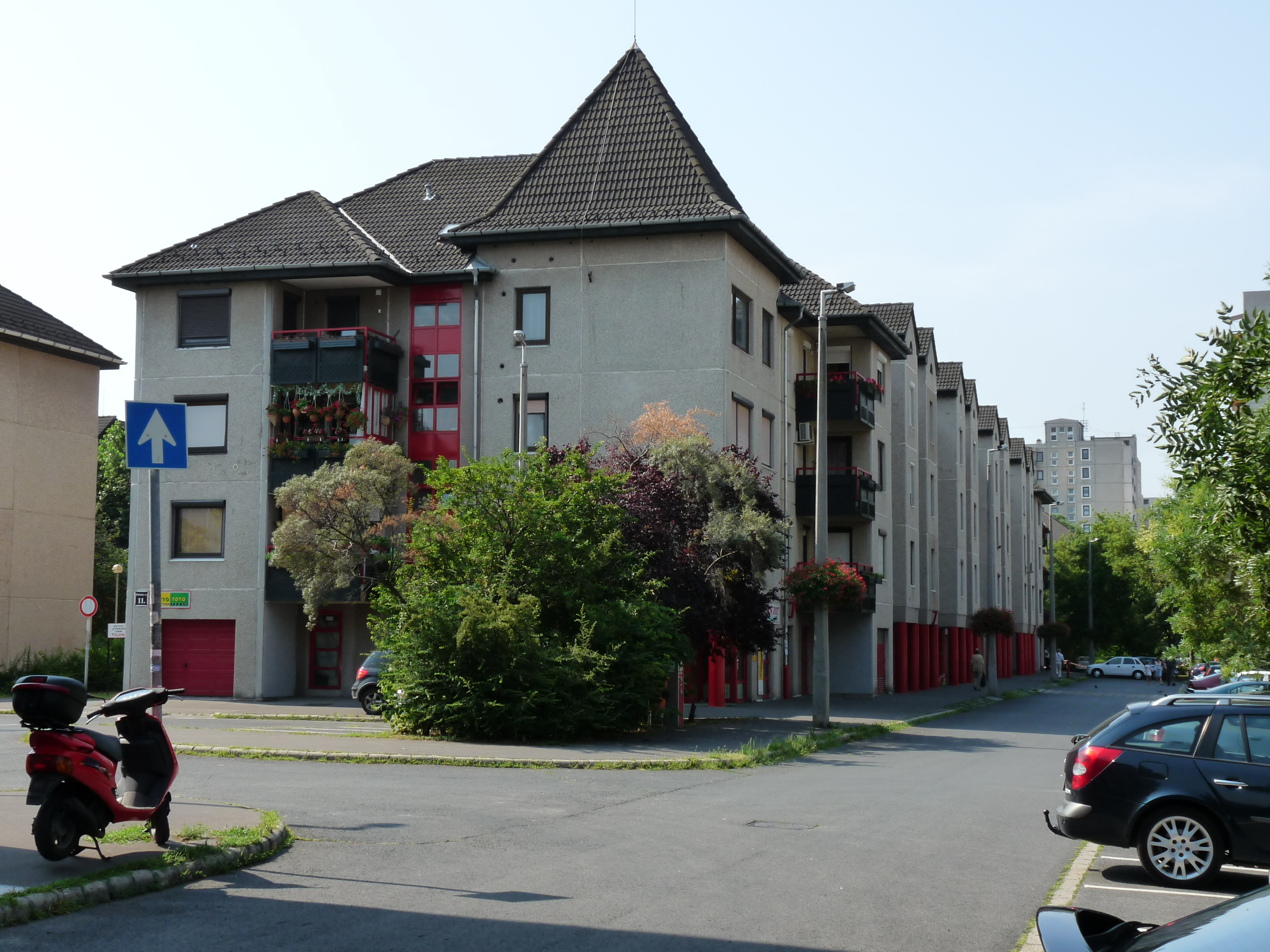
3-storey panel block in Budapest (built in 1989) with tiled roof

After World War II a serious housing crisis developed in Hungary due to rapid population growth and urbanization. The exodus of the rural population from rural areas after the collectivization in the late 1940s and the early 1950s was particularly important as a source of migration. Budapest and other cities became overcrowded, and the Communist government eventually responded. After several study visits and conventions, in the early 1960s Hungary bought the large-panel system (LPS) from the Soviet Union and Denmark. The Danish technology was known as the Larsen-Nielsen system and was a common housing method in Western Europe, Turkey, and Hong Kong. By the late 1960s, Hungarian engineers developed the country's own large-panel system (mostly based on the Soviet LPS), adapted to the Hungarian situation. The large-panel system permitted rapid construction that was not constrained by Hungary's relatively cold winters. After the 1968 Ronan Point explosion (a Larsen-Nielsen-type tower block partial collapse in London), Hungarian engineers modified the original system, made the structure more compact and the joints stronger. The Larsen-Nielsen system was retired in Hungary in 1970.

The first, experimental panel residential building was built in Dunaújváros (new industrial city) in 1961, followed by other blocks in Pécs and Debrecen in 1963. The first precast concrete panel work was finished in 1962 in Dunaújváros, while the first large-panel system (LPS) housing factory (these works produced near all parts of these buildings, including the built-up kitchen units and the built-up wardrobes), was built in 1965 in Óbuda, Budapest. The first LPS building also was built in Óbuda in 1965.

The structure of Hungarian cities in the immediate post-war period consisted of a historic core surrounded by mostly single-story buildings and workers' houses, predominantly on unpaved streets. The nationwide public housing program of the 1960s changed this. The Communist government demolished the single-story buildings, replacing them with panel blocks. It also created new neighbourhoods on former farmland around the cities.

Panel apartments provided their inhabitants with a real improvement in living conditions. Two and three-bedroom sunny apartments with district heating, piped hot water, and flush toilets replaced what had been predominantly one-bedroom dwellings without modern conveniences. According to the 1960 census, one-bedroom flats made up 60% of the dwellings in Budapest; this had decreased to 25% in 1990. During this period, the share of dwellings with three or more bedrooms rose from 9% to 35%. The last panel building was finished in 1993.

The Hungarian government and local municipalities started renovation programs during the 2000s. These programs insulated the panel buildings, replaced the old doors and windows with multi-layer thermo glass, renovated the heating system, and gave the buildings more attractive exterior colours.

These buildings still dominate the Hungarian cityscape. The share of panel dwellings is 31% in Budapest, 39% in Debrecen, 52% in Miskolc, 38% in Szeged, 42% in Pécs, 41% in Győr, 50% in Székesfehérvár and 60% in Dunaújváros.

=== Former housing factories ===
City	Plant	Start of working	Technological equipment
Budapest	Budapesti I.sz. Házgyár (BHK I.)	1965	Soviet-Hungarian
Budapest	Budapesti II.sz. Házgyár (BHK II.)	1968	Danish (Larsen-Nielsen)
Budapest	Budapesti III.sz. Házgyár (BHK III.)	1970	Soviet-Hungarian
Budapest	Budapesti IV.sz. Házgyár (BHK IV.)	1974	Soviet-Hungarian
Győr	Győri Házgyár (GyHK)	1968	Soviet, GDR and Hungarian
Miskolc	Miskolci Házgyár (MHK)	1969	Soviet-Hungarian
Debrecen	Debreceni Házgyár (DHK)	1971	Soviet-Hungarian
Szeged	Szegedi Házgyár (SzHK)	1972	Soviet-Hungarian
Veszprém	Veszprémi Házgyár (VHK)	1975	Soviet-Hungarian
Kecskemét	Kecskeméti Házgyár (KHK)	1976	Soviet-Hungarian

=== Former panel works ===
City	Plant	Start of working	Technological equipment
Dunaújváros	Dunaújvárosi Panelüzem	1962 (shut down in 1982)	Hungarian
Pécs	Pécsi Panelüzem	1963	Hungarian
Szolnok	Szolnoki Panelüzem	1969 (shut down in 1978)	Hungarian
Békéscsaba	Békéscsabai Panelüzem	1970	Hungarian
Szekszárd	Szekszárdi Panelüzem	1972	Hungarian
Kaposvár	Kaposvári Panelüzem	1973	Hungarian

== Statistics ==
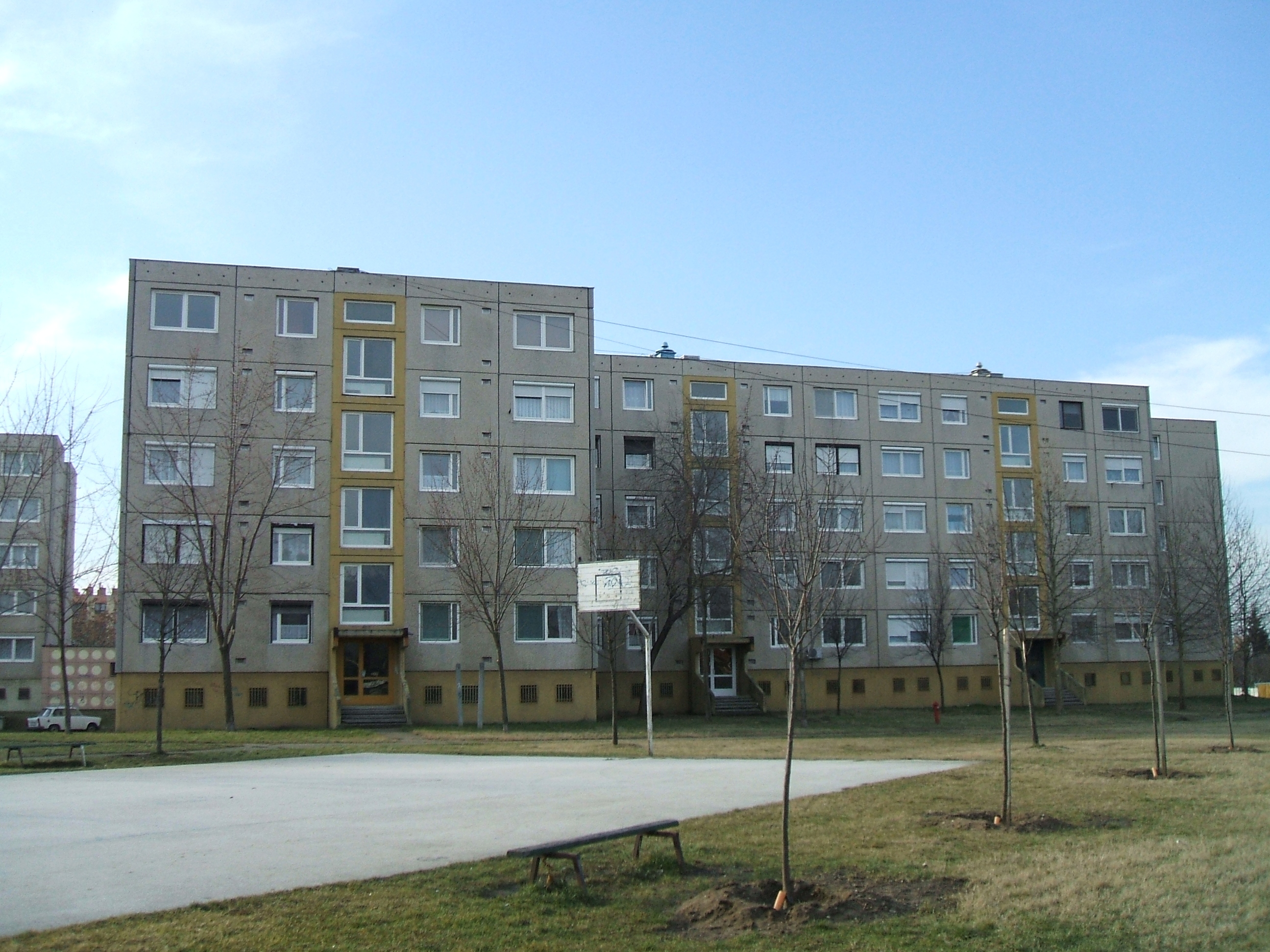
5-storey panel block in Dorog (built in 1987). These late-1980s buildings were built with metal reinforced plastic (non-flammable PVC) windows, including 2-layer thermo glass (built by the GyHK)

According to the 2011 census, there were 829,177 panel flats in Hungary (777,263 inhabited, 51,914 tenantless, 18.9% of the dwellings overall), of whom there were 548,464 flats (66.1%) in large-panel system buildings (LPS) and 280,713 (33.9%) in precast concrete (PC) buildings (the LPS is originally unplastered, while the PC is plastered and painted). 7,423 (0.9%) flats were built before 1960, 115,471 (13.9%) in the 1960s, 396,158 (47.8%) in the 1970s, 262,004 (31.6%) in the 1980s, while 48,121 (5.8%) flats were built after 1990. These flats were home to 1,741,577 people (17.5% of the total population). There were 58,698 (7.1% of the total) one-bedroom, 421,274 (50.8%) two-bedroom, 271,422 (32.7%) three-bedroom flat, while 77,783 panel flats (9.4%) had four or more bedroom in 2011.

Average floor space was 54 m^{2} for an LPS flat and 69 m^{2} for a PC flat in 2011, lower than the national average (78 m^{2}). The average floor space for a state-built flat (mostly panel flats) was 48 m^{2} in the 1960s, 53 m² in the 1970s and 55 m² in the 1980s, significantly smaller than a privately built one (panel blocks also were built by non-governmental organizations, mostly housing cooperatives). Despite economic hardship, flats got even bigger in the late 1980s (before the fall of the Communism), the largest panel flats were built in the Káposztásmegyer housing estate of Budapest with 124 m².

The society of panel housing estates was heterogeneous until the privatization in the early 1990s (after the fall of the Communism), when the poor and the rich fled from these buildings, making them middle class characteristic. The residents of panel buildings predominantly have an above-average level of education, according to the 2011 census, 19.1% of the residents over 25 had Bachelor's degree or higher, while the national average was 17.3%.

== Largest panel housing estates ==
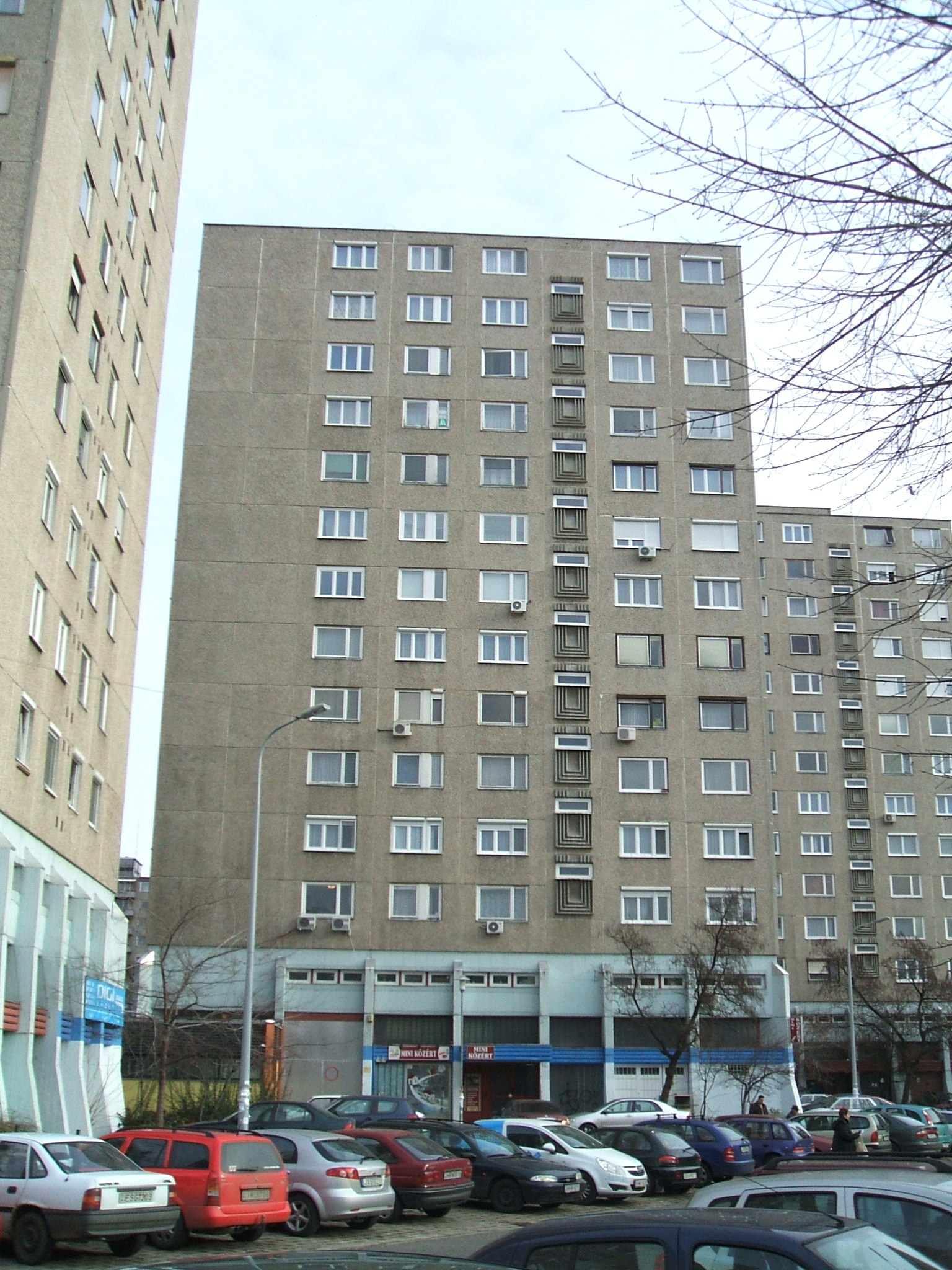
Budapest-Újpalota (built by the BHK III.)

Lakótelep (housing estate)	City	Flats	Inhabitants (person)
Újpest-Városközpont ("Újpest City Center")	Budapest	16,832	36,000
Újpalota	Budapest	15,886	33,000
Pécs-Kertváros ("Pécs Garden City")	Pécs	15,856	35,000
Óbuda-Városközpont ("Óbuda City Center")	Budapest	13,736	27,000
Békásmegyeri lakótelep ("Békásmegyer housing estate")	Budapest	13,394	27,000
Füredi utcai lakótelep ("Füredi housing estate")	Budapest	12,233	21,000
Kispesti lakótelep ("Kispest housing estate")	Budapest	12,000	27,000
Avasi lakótelep ("Avas housing estate")	Miskolc	11,498	40,000
Pécs-Uránváros ("Pécs Uranium City")	Pécs	9,651	22,000
Tatabánya-Újváros ("Tatabánya New City")	Tatabánya	8,862	20,000
Széchenyi város lakótelep ("Széchenyitown housing estate")	Kecskemét	8,673	20,000

== Equivalents in other countries ==
- Khrushchevka (Soviet Union)
- Panelák and Sídlisko (Czech Republic and Slovakia)
- Large-panel-system building (Germany)
- Systematization (Romania)
- Ugsarmal bair (Mongolian People's Republic)

== In popular culture ==
- Béla Tarr's film Panelkapcsolat tells a doomed love story set in a housing project in Hungary. Special Mention at the 1982 Locarno Film Festival.

== See also ==
- Housing estate
- Public housing
- Affordable housing
- Subsidized housing
- Urban planning in communist countries
