= Panel building =

Type of residential building

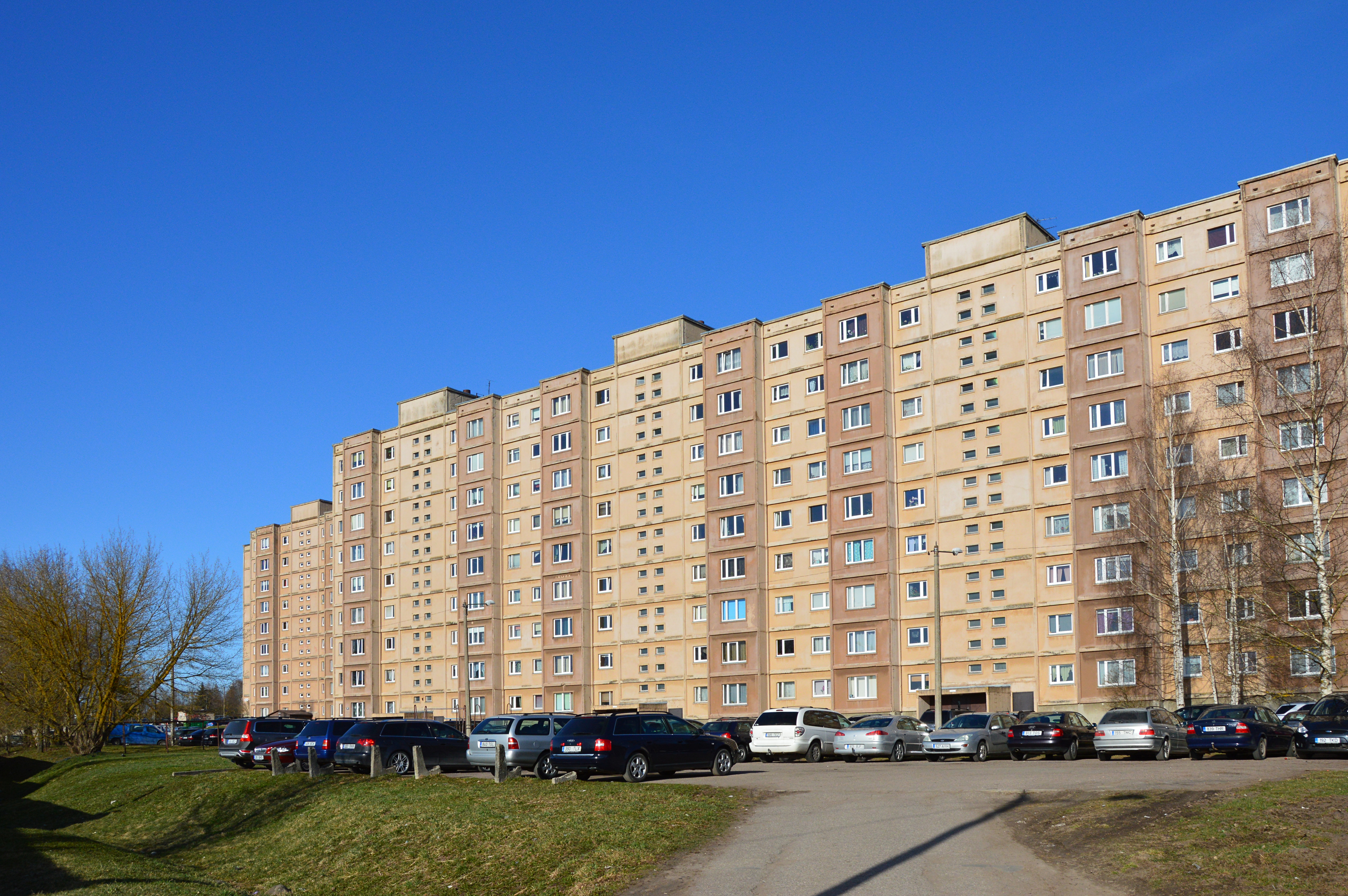
Panel building in Tartu, Estonia

A panel building is a structure assembled from factory-made concrete panels which are then transported to a site and connected together like a large-scale kit. Following massive destruction from World War II, Europe faced a massive housing shortage and governments needed to house millions of soldiers and relocated workers. Prefab houses were seen as the best fit because they can easily meet the demand are cheap and quick to build. As a result, thousands were built across Europe and the Soviet Union. This era cemented prefab as a mainstream construction method.

Panel buildings include the following types of building:

- Built of structural insulated panels
- Built of pre-fabricated concrete blocks, named differently in various countries.
- Large Panel System building known as Plattenbau in German, Panelák in Czech and Slovak, wielka płyta in Polish, Panelka in Bulgarian and Panelház in Hungarian. Most, but not all Khrushchyovka houses in the former Soviet Union are also constructed using this technology.

Panel buildings can be either frameless (column-less), or the panels can be fitted to:

- Timber-, steel- or reinforced concrete-framed buildings,
- over common blockwork,
- or over existing masonry products.

== See also ==
- Prefabricated building
- Large panel system building
- Panel buildings in Russia
- Panelák
- Panelház
- Million Programme
- Urban planning in communist countries
- Kit house, a similar housing type predominantly found in the U.S. and Canada
