= Mindszent Church =

Coordinates: 48.0988°N 20.7847°E

- Apostles St. Peter and St. Paul Church
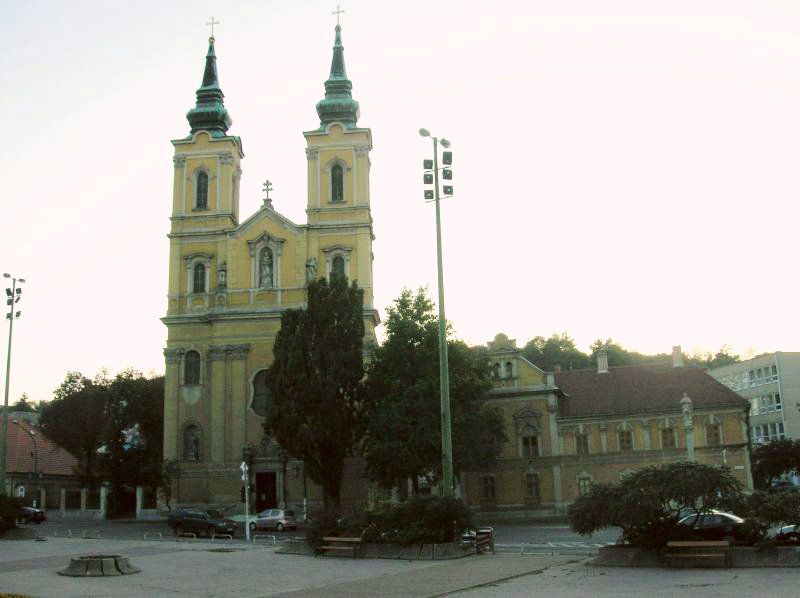
- Mindszent Church
- Location: Miskolc
- Country: Hungary
- Denomination: Roman Catholic
- Website: http://www.miskolc-mindszent.hu

History
- Status: Parish church
- Founded: 1724
- Dedication: ss. Peter and Paul
- Consecrated: 1748

Architecture
- Functional status: active
- Style: Baroque
- Completed: 1880

Administration
- Diocese: Borsod
- Archdeaconry: Archdiocese of Eger
- Deanery: Miskolc
- Parish: Miskolc-Mindszent

Clergy
- Priest: bishop Ferenc Palánki

The Mindszent Church (Mindszenti templom) is a Roman Catholic parish church in the centre of Miskolc, Hungary. It was built between 1724 and 1880 in Baroque style. It is officially called St. Peter and Paul Church, but in colloquial speech it's always referred to as Mindszent church.

The church stands on Mindszent Place, which is a triangular place bordered by the church, the International Trade Center and the County Office of National Health Service. The place was named after the mediaeval village of Mindszent ("All Saints"), which stood here. The church was built where once the village's chapel stood.

The chapel and the hospital next to it were first mentioned in 1507. It was renovated in 1562 by the orders of Borbála Fánchy, the owner of the Castle of Diósgyőr. In the first half of the 18th century Abbot Mihály Frigyes Althan decided to build a larger church in the chapel's place. It is likely that the church was designed by Giovanni Battista Carlone, who also designed the Minorite Church of Miskolc. The church – although construction was still not finished – was consecrated in 1748.

The construction of the new hospital began in 1761. The parsonage was built in 1778.

In the second half of the century ownership disputes arose, both the Archdiocese of Eger and the Diocese of Munkács laid claims to it. Empress Maria Theresa settled the dispute by giving the responsibility of maintaining the church to the Diósgyőr estate.

Emperor Franz Joseph visited the city in 1857, and seeing the still unfinished church he offered to pay the expenses of constructing one of the towers. The Archbishop of Eger also offered a large sum of money, and several members of the parish donated as well. In 1864 the construction of the two towers began, by the end of the year one of them was complete, the other tower was completed shortly thereafter.

Inside of the church there are beautiful Baroque paintings and statues. The painting of the Apostles St. Peter and St. Paul at the high altar was painted by Mihály Kovács in 1855. The other altar paintings also were done by him in 1879.

The Baroque statue of Mary with the jar (1739) stands before the church. A small Calvary shrine can be found not far from the church; it was consecrated by the Archbishop of Eger in 1864.
