= Miskolc =

City in Hungary

- City with county rights
- Miskolc Megyei Jogú Város
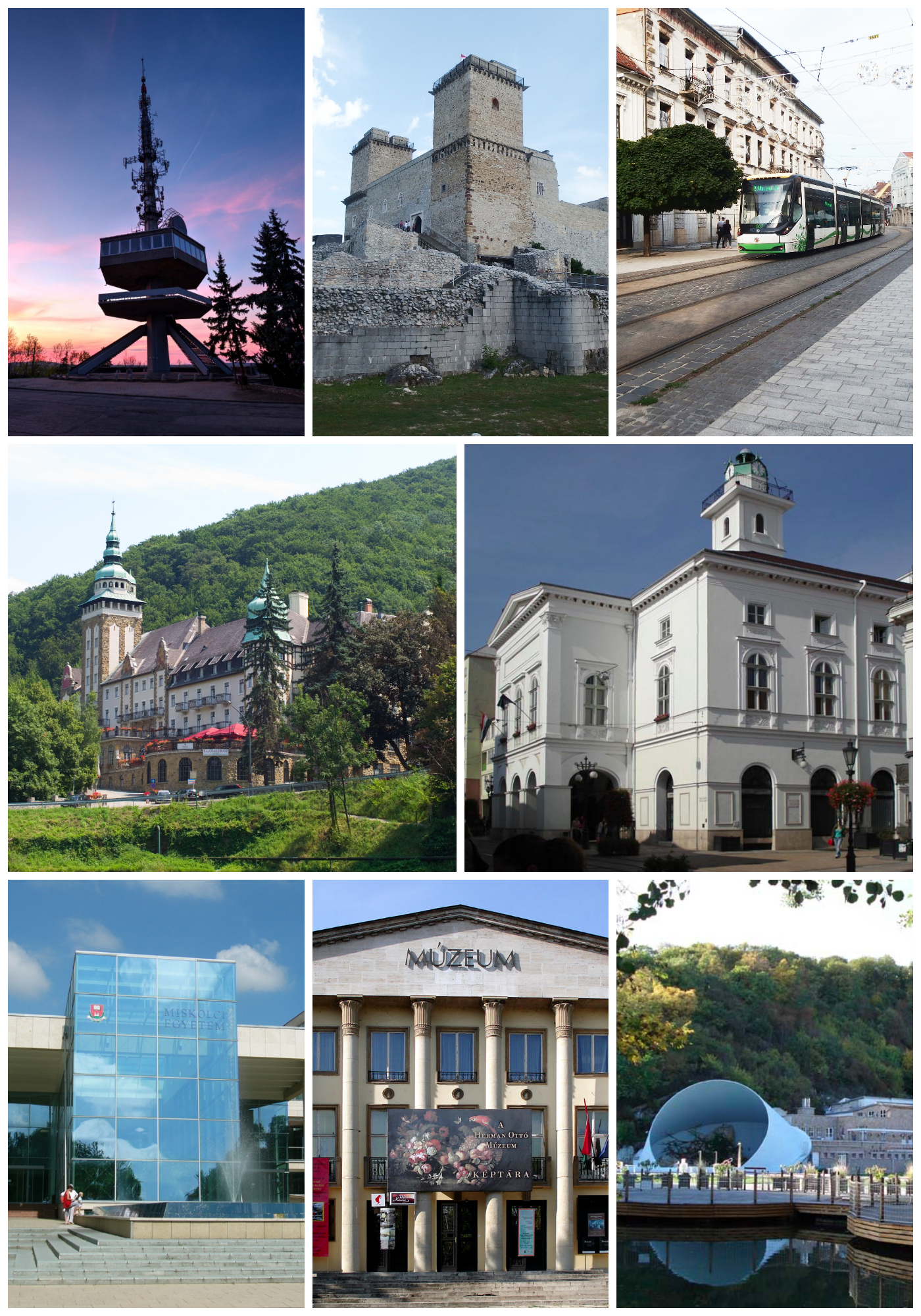
- Clockwise from the top left corner: Avas TV Tower, Castle of Diósgyőr, Széchenyi Street, National Theatre of Miskolc, Cave Bath, Ottó Herman Museum, University of Miskolc, Palace Hotel of Lillafüred

- Flag Coat of arms Logo
- Nicknames: Steel City; City of the Open Gates
- Location within Borsod-Abaúj-Zemplén County Location within Hungary
- Coordinates: 48°06′15″N 20°47′30″E
- Country: Hungary
- Region: Northern Hungary
- County: Borsod-Abaúj-Zemplén
- District: Miskolc
- Established: 9th century AD
- Market town: 1365

Government
  - Mayor: Tóth-Szántai József (Fidesz-KDNP)
  - Deputy Mayor: (Independent)
  - Town Notary: Dávid Ignácz

Area
  - City with county rights: 236.67 km^{2} (91.38 sq mi)
- Elevation: 131 m (430 ft)
- Highest elevation: 945 m (3,100 ft)
- Lowest elevation: 110 m (360 ft)

Population (2024)
  - City with county rights: 143,502
  - Rank: 4th in Hungary
  - Density: 606/km^{2} (1,570/sq mi)
  - Urban: 294,144 (3rd)
- Demonym: miskolci
- Time zone: UTC+1 (CET)
  - Summer (DST): UTC+2 (CEST)
- Postal code: 3500 to 3549
- Area code: (+36) 46
- Motorways: M30 Motorway
- NUTS 3 code: HU311
- Distance from Budapest: 182 km (113 mi) East
- MP: Katalin Csöbör (Fidesz); György Hubay (Fidesz)
- Website: en.miskolc.hu

Miskolc (UK: /ˈmiːʃkɒlts/ MEESH-kolts, US: /ˈmɪʃkoʊlts/ MISH-kohlts; Hungarian: [ˈmiʃkolt͡s]; Czech and Slovak: Miškovec; German: Mischkolz; Yiddish: Mishkoltz; Romanian: Mișcolț) is a city in northeastern Hungary, known for its heavy industry. With a population of 143,502 as of 2024, Miskolc is the fourth largest city in Hungary, behind Budapest, Debrecen, and Szeged. It is also the county capital of Borsod-Abaúj-Zemplén and the regional centre of Northern Hungary.

== Etymology ==
The name derives from Miško, Slavic form of Michael. Miškovec → Miskolc with the same development as Lipovec → Lipólc, Lipóc. The name is associated with the Miskolc clan (also Miskóc or Myscouch, Slovak Miškovec, plural Miškovci) named after the settlement or vice versa. Earliest mentions are que nunc vocatur Miscoucy (around 1200), de Myschouch (1225), Ponyt de genere Myscouch (1230), in Miscovcy (1245).

== Geography ==
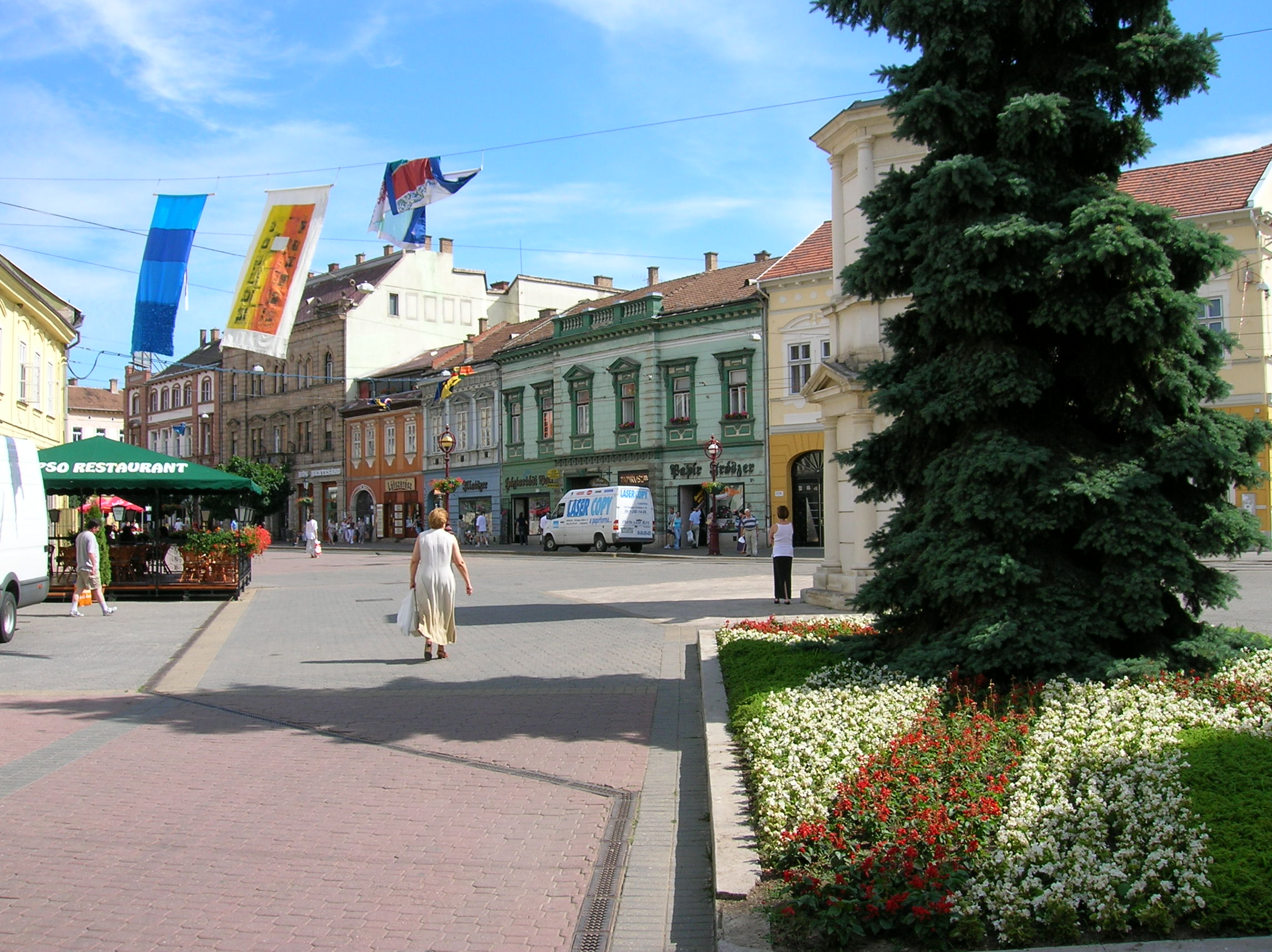
Miskolc City Hall Square

The city lies at the meeting point of different geographical regions – east of the Bükk mountains, in the valley of the river Sajó and the streams Hejő and Szinva. According to the 2001 Census the city has a total area of 236.68 km^{2} (91.38 sq mi). The ground level slopes gradually; the difference between the highest and lowest area is about 800 m (2,600 ft).

The lowest areas are the banks of the river Sajó, with an altitude of 110–120 m (360–390 ft). The area belongs to the Great Plain region and is made up of sedimentary rocks. Between the Avas hill and Diósgyőr lies the hilly area of the Lower Bükk (250–300 m or 820–980 ft) consisting of sandstone, marl, clay, layers of coal, from the tertiary period, and volcanic rocks from the Miocene.

The Central Bükk, a gently sloping mountainous area with an altitude between 400 and 600 m (1,300 and 2,000 ft), is situated between Diósgyőr and Lillafüred; the area is made up of limestone, slate, dolomite and other rocks from the Triassic period. The surface was formed mostly by karstic erosions.

The highest area, the 600–900 m (2,000–3,000 ft) high Higher Bükk bore Bükk Highlands begin at Lillafüred. This mostly consists of sea sediments (limestone, slate, dolomite) from the Paleozoic and Mesozoic, and volcanic rocks like diabase and porphyry. Several caves can be found in the area. The city is also known for the lowest temperature ever recorded in Hungary at−35 °C (−31 °F).

=== Climate ===
Summers are fresh but sometimes warm and humid in Miskolc. Daytime temperatures of 20–30 °C (68–86 °F) or higher are commonplace. Snow and ice are dominant during the winter season. Miskolc receives about 120 centimetres of snowfall annually. Days below freezing and nights below −20 °C (−4 °F) both occur in the winter.

Climate data for Miskolc, 1991−2020 normals, extremes 1961−2020
| Month | Jan | Feb | Mar | Apr | May | Jun | Jul | Aug | Sep | Oct | Nov | Dec | Year |
|---|---|---|---|---|---|---|---|---|---|---|---|---|---|
| Record high °C (°F) | 16.1 (61.0) | 18.9 (66.0) | 25.8 (78.4) | 29.9 (85.8) | 33.3 (91.9) | 36.4 (97.5) | 39.3 (102.7) | 38.1 (100.6) | 34.8 (94.6) | 28.1 (82.6) | 22.2 (72.0) | 16.6 (61.9) | 39.3 (102.7) |
| Mean daily maximum °C (°F) | 2.0 (35.6) | 4.8 (40.6) | 11.0 (51.8) | 17.7 (63.9) | 22.5 (72.5) | 26.1 (79.0) | 28.1 (82.6) | 28.0 (82.4) | 22.3 (72.1) | 15.7 (60.3) | 8.7 (47.7) | 2.6 (36.7) | 15.8 (60.4) |
| Daily mean °C (°F) | −1.3 (29.7) | 0.6 (33.1) | 5.7 (42.3) | 11.5 (52.7) | 16.2 (61.2) | 19.9 (67.8) | 21.5 (70.7) | 21.2 (70.2) | 16.1 (61.0) | 10.4 (50.7) | 5.0 (41.0) | −0.1 (31.8) | 10.6 (51.1) |
| Mean daily minimum °C (°F) | −3.9 (25.0) | −2.6 (27.3) | 1.1 (34.0) | 6.0 (42.8) | 10.6 (51.1) | 14.4 (57.9) | 16.0 (60.8) | 15.6 (60.1) | 11.2 (52.2) | 6.2 (43.2) | 2.1 (35.8) | −2.6 (27.3) | 6.2 (43.2) |
| Record low °C (°F) | −32.6 (−26.7) | −35.0 (−31.0) | −22.0 (−7.6) | −9.7 (14.5) | −2.8 (27.0) | −0.9 (30.4) | 3.9 (39.0) | 3.1 (37.6) | −3.9 (25.0) | −12.8 (9.0) | −22.4 (−8.3) | −27.0 (−16.6) | −35.0 (−31.0) |
| Average precipitation mm (inches) | 28.0 (1.10) | 35.3 (1.39) | 31.3 (1.23) | 47.4 (1.87) | 67.0 (2.64) | 85.0 (3.35) | 91.1 (3.59) | 64.6 (2.54) | 53.8 (2.12) | 56.8 (2.24) | 44.6 (1.76) | 39.0 (1.54) | 643.9 (25.35) |
| Average precipitation days (≥ 1.0 mm) | 5.6 | 5.7 | 5.1 | 6.9 | 9.4 | 9.0 | 9.3 | 6.7 | 6.3 | 6.6 | 6.7 | 6.8 | 84.1 |
| Average relative humidity (%) | 81.3 | 75.1 | 63.4 | 59.8 | 63.5 | 65.2 | 64.6 | 64.5 | 70.5 | 77.3 | 83.2 | 84.5 | 71.1 |
| Average dew point °C (°F) | −5.3 (22.5) | −3.1 (26.4) | −0.1 (31.8) | 4.1 (39.4) | 9.4 (48.9) | 12.5 (54.5) | 13.7 (56.7) | 13.5 (56.3) | 10.5 (50.9) | 5.8 (42.4) | 1.4 (34.5) | −2.9 (26.8) | 5.0 (40.9) |
| Mean monthly sunshine hours | 40.8 | 69.5 | 128.4 | 177.2 | 224.0 | 224.2 | 254.5 | 236.4 | 180.8 | 141.6 | 53.2 | 36.0 | 1,766.6 |
Source: NOAA (sun and dew point for 1961−1990)

== History ==
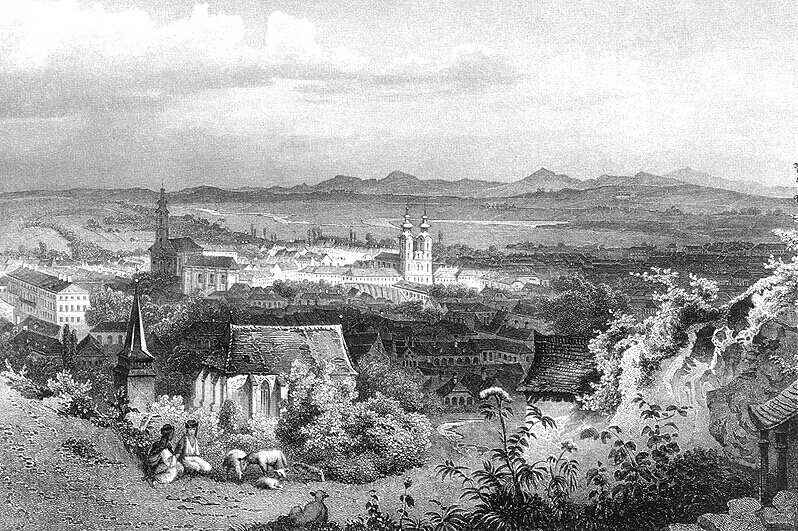
Historical picture of the city. View from the Avas hill with the Gothic church in the foreground. The church with two towers is the Minorite Church on today's Heroes' Square.

The area has been inhabited since ancient times – archaeological findings date back to the Paleolithic, proving human presence for over 70,000 years. Its first known dwellers were the Cotini, one of the Celtic tribes. Hungarians have settled the area since the conquest of the Carpathian Basin in the late 9th century. It was first mentioned by this name around 1210 AD. The Miskóc clan lost their power when King Charles I centralized his power by curbing the power of the oligarchs.

Following the devastating Mongol invasion of 1241–1242, which left the original local fortifications in ruins, Miskolc was elevated to the rank of oppidum (market town) in 1365 by King Louis I. He also had the castle of the nearby town Diósgyőr, now a district of Miskolc, transformed into a Gothic fortress. The city developed in a dynamic way, but during the Ottoman occupation of most of Hungary the development of Miskolc was brought to a standstill. The Ottomans under Suleiman the Magnificent took Miskolc in 1544 and the city prospered further until 1687. It was also ruled by Ottomans after Battle of Mezőkeresztes in 1596 as part of Eyalet of Egir until 1687. It was during these years that Miskolc became an important centre of wine-growing. By the end of the 17th century the population of the city was as large as that of Kassa/Košice, and 13 guilds had been founded.

During the war of independence against Habsburg rule in the early 18th century, Prince Francis II Rákóczi, the leader of the Hungarians, put his headquarters in Miskolc. The imperial forces sacked and burnt the city in 1707. Four years later half of the population fell victim to a cholera epidemic. Miskolc recovered quickly, and another age of prosperity began again. In 1724, Miskolc was chosen to be the city where the county hall of Borsod county would be built. Many other significant buildings were built in the 18th and 19th centuries, including the city hall, schools such as Lévay József Református Gimnázium és Diákotthon, churches, the synagogue, and the theatre. The theatre is commonly regarded as the first stone-built theatre of Hungary, although the first one was actually built in Kolozsvár (then a part of Hungary, now Cluj-Napoca, Romania). According to the first nationally held census (1786) the city had a population of 14,719, and 2,414 houses.

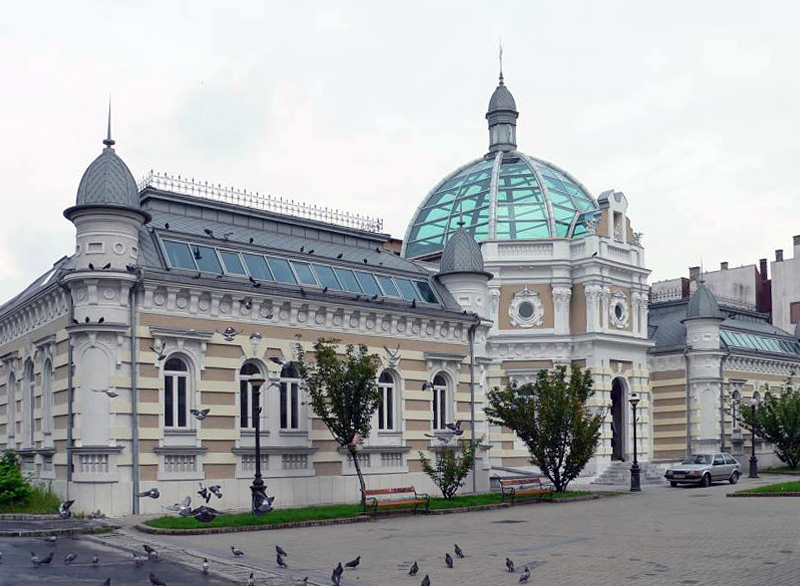
Elizabeth Square

These years brought prosperity, but the cholera epidemic of 1873 and the flood of 1878 took many lives. Several buildings were destroyed by the flood, but bigger and grander buildings were built in their places. World War I did not affect the city directly, but many people died, either from warfare or from the cholera epidemic. It was occupied by Czechoslovak troops between 1918 and 1919 after the First World War.

After the Treaty of Trianon, Hungary lost Kassa (today Košice, Slovakia) and Miskolc became the sole regional center of northern Hungary. This was one of the reasons for the enormous growth of the city during the 1930s and 1940s.

Early in World War II Hungary became an ally of Nazi Germany. Unhappy with the Hungarian government, German troops occupied Hungary on 19 March 1944 and put the anti-semitic Arrow Cross Party in charge of the government. Jews in Miskolc and elsewhere were ordered to wear yellow stars on their clothing. Under the supervision of Nazi SS-Obersturmbannführer Adolf Eichmann, "deportations" from Miskolc began on 11 or 12 June 1944. Over 14,000 Jewish adults and children were sent by cattle car to Auschwitz, where most were gassed on arrival. After the war Jews who survived the holocaust returned to Miskolc hoping to reclaim their land and possessions. Over 130 were rounded up by members of the local Arrow Cross Party and summarily murdered. The Jewish cemetery on a hill overlooking Miskolc has a memorial for them. It includes the 10 commandments, carved in stone, all written in Hebrew except Thou shall not kill, which is written in Hungarian.

The preparation for World War II established Miskolc as the national centre of heavy industry, a position the city maintained until the 1990s. Although Miskolc suffered a lot during the last year of the war, it recovered quickly, and by absorbing the surrounding villages, it became the second-largest city of Hungary with more than 200,000 inhabitants.

On 30 July and 1 August 1946, the Miskolc pogrom led to death of one accused Jewish black marketeer, the wounding of another, and subsequently the death of a Jewish policeman. Economic hardship and anti-Semitism motivated the riots.

In 1949, the University of Miskolc was founded (as a successor of the Academy of Mining, formerly in Selmecbánya, which is now Banská Štiavnica, Slovakia).

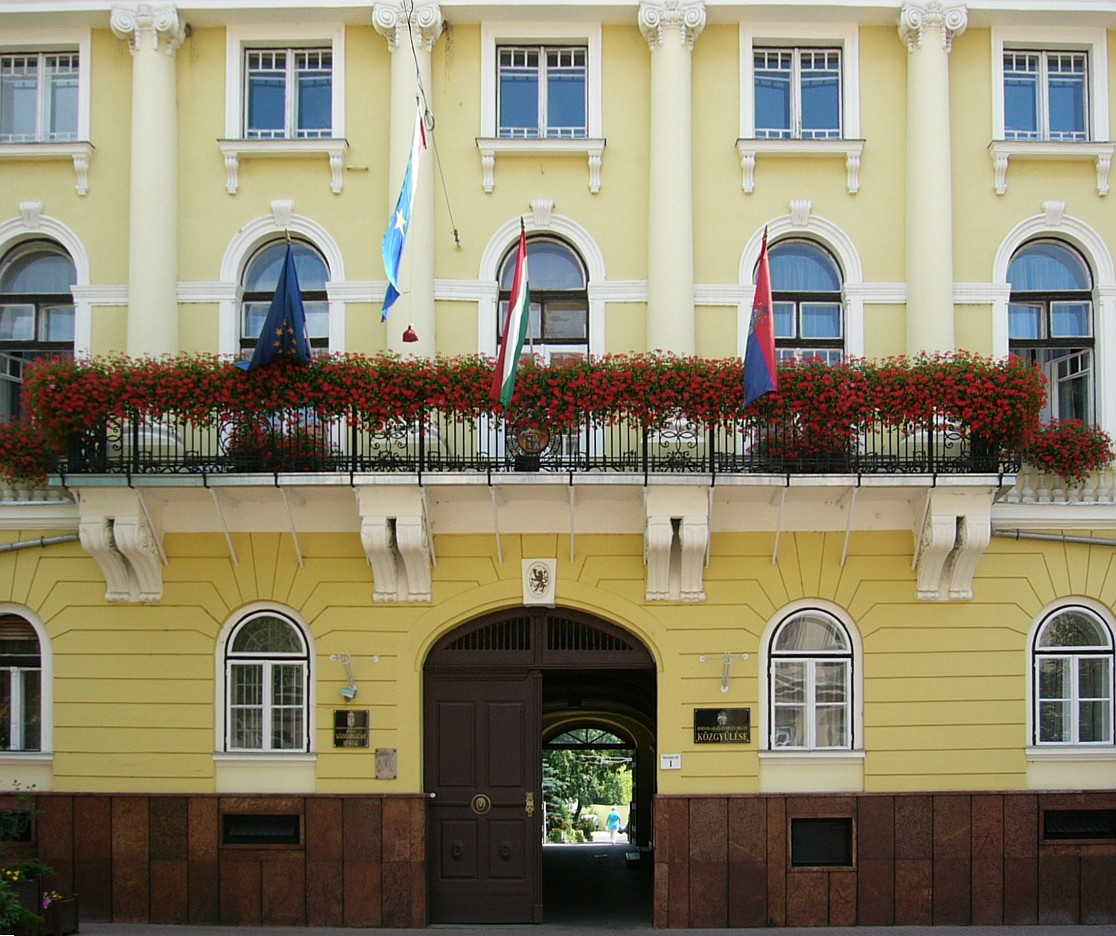
County hall of Borsod-Abaúj-Zemplén on City Hall square

During its long history Miskolc survived fires, floods, plagues and foreign invasions, but maintained its position as the centre of northeastern Hungary. The 1990s brought a crisis in the iron industry with a decline in the population.

Miskolc is now trying to become known as a cultural – instead of merely an industrial – city. Among the various cultural events, one of the most important festivities is the International Opera Festival, held every summer.

Tourist destinations in Miskolc include Tapolca, Lillafüred, and Felsőhámor. Tapolca features a park with a boating pond and a cave bath. Lillafüred and Felsőhámor are villages located in a valley surrounded by mountains and forests; their sights include the Hotel Palace on the shore of Lake Hámori, the Szinva waterfall, the Anna Cave, and the István Cave.

== Demographics ==
Historical population
| Year | Pop. | ±% |
|---|---|---|
| 1870 | 31,061 | — |
| 1880 | 34,086 | +9.7% |
| 1890 | 42,970 | +26.1% |
| 1900 | 61,767 | +43.7% |
| 1910 | 76,804 | +24.3% |
| 1920 | 85,761 | +11.7% |
| 1930 | 94,539 | +10.2% |
| 1941 | 115,397 | +22.1% |
| 1949 | 109,841 | −4.8% |
| 1960 | 144,741 | +31.8% |
| 1970 | 181,398 | +25.3% |
| 1980 | 208,103 | +14.7% |
| 1990 | 196,442 | −5.6% |
| 2001 | 184,125 | −6.3% |
| 2011 | 167,754 | −8.9% |
| 2022 | 147,533 | −12.1% |
Source: KSH

The population (around 1910) is multidenominational and multiethnical, and the differences in the level of education mirrors the stratification of society, following these facts. http://mek.oszk.hu/16900/16992

=== Religion ===
Religion in Miskolc (2022)
1. Roman Catholicism (23.4%)
2. Calvinism (14.3%)
3. Greek Catholicism (4.00%)
4. Evangelical Christianity (0.80%)
5. Other (1.70%)
6. Undeclared (43.6%)
7. Irreligion (12.2%)

Dominant religion in Miskolc is Roman Catholicism followed by Calvinism and Greek Catholicism.

== Economy ==
Miskolc is generally thought of as an industrial city, and the largest boost to its economy was indeed provided by the industrialization during the Socialist era; in fact industry (including metallurgy) has a long history in the city.

Miskolc was already an important market town in the Middle Ages, mostly due to its proximity to the main trade routes of the region. In regards of the economy, real development started only after the Ottoman occupation. In the 18th century, the town already had a lumber mill, a paper manufacture, a brewery, a gunpowder factory and fifteen mills on the Szinva stream. The glass works manufactures and iron furnaces appeared in the late 18th and early 19th centuries. The first iron furnace, built by Henrik Fazola around 1770, did not survive, but the second one, built in 1813, can still be visited. Several new settlements were formed in the Bükk mountains to provide dwellings for the workers of glass works manufactures and furnaces. Many of them – including Alsóhámor, Felsőhámor, Ómassa and Bükkszentlászló – are now parts of Miskolc.

Development quickened from the second half of the 19th century, partly because of the political situation (after the Ausgleich) and partly because of the newly constructed railway line. A large furnace (second largest in the country) was built in Diósgyőr, and several other factories were built. The mining industry became more and more important, too. Within forty years the population doubled. The industrialization led to the forming of Greater Miskolc with the unification of Miskolc and Diósgyőr (1945) and several nearby towns and villages (between 1950 and 1981). The unification was only the first step in Miskolc being developed into an industrial centre. Development reached its highest point in the 1980s, when the metal factory had more than 18,000 workers and production was over one million tons per year. The population hit all-time record (over 200,000 inhabitants), two-thirds of the working people worked in heavy industry.

The economic recession after the end of the Socialist era hit the industrial cities of Northern Hungary the hardest. The unemployment rate rose until it became one of the highest in the country, the population of Miskolc dramatically decreased (not only because of unemployment though, but also due to suburbanization which became prevalent nationwide). The economic situation of the city went through a change, smaller enterprises appeared in place of the large state-owned companies.

By the early 2000s the decade of changes was over, and the city went through the recession successfully. International companies and supermarkets appeared in the area. The local government is trying to strengthen the city's role in culture and tourism. By the end of 2004, the highway M3 had reached the city.

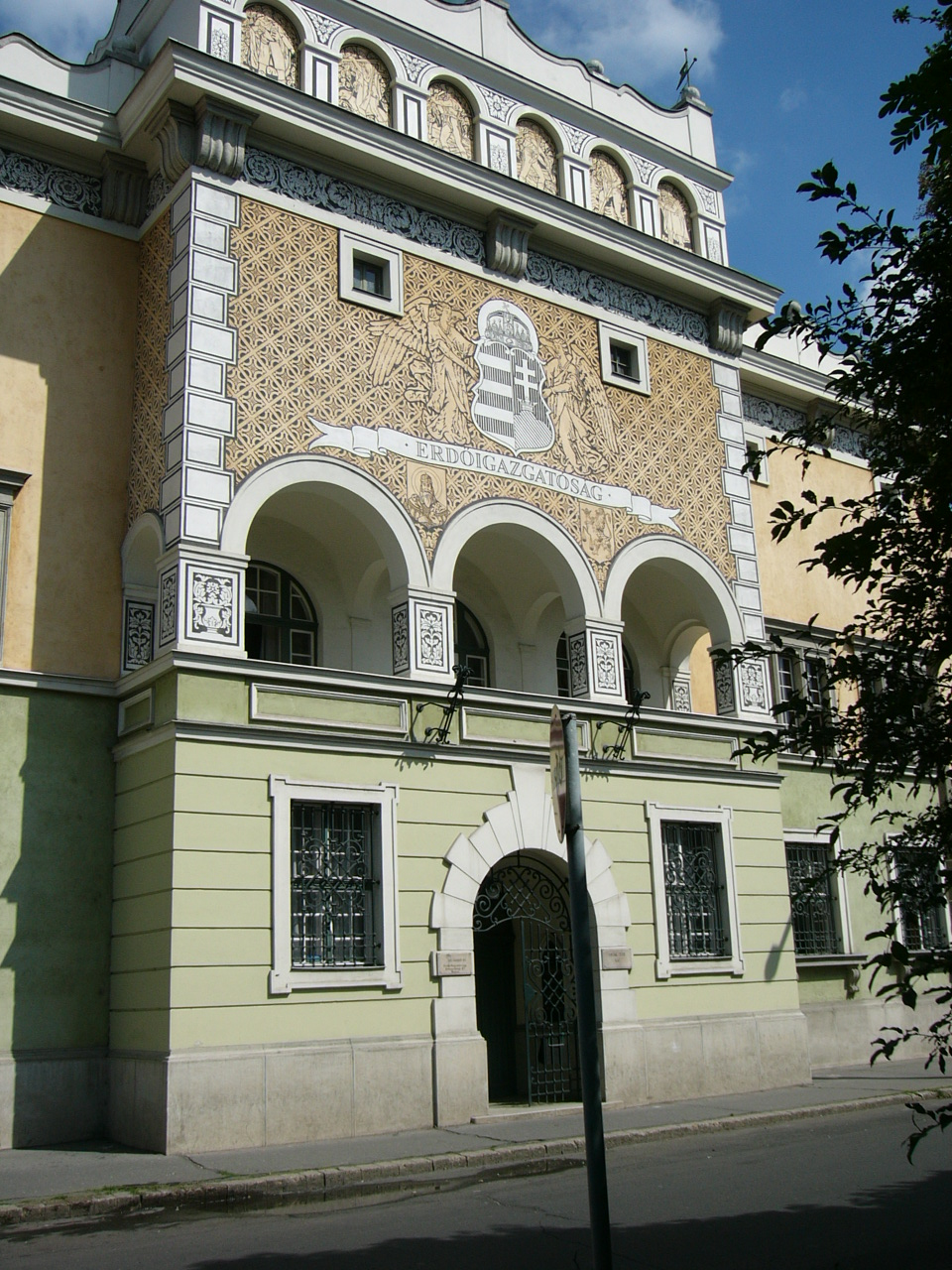
Forestry Office on Deák square

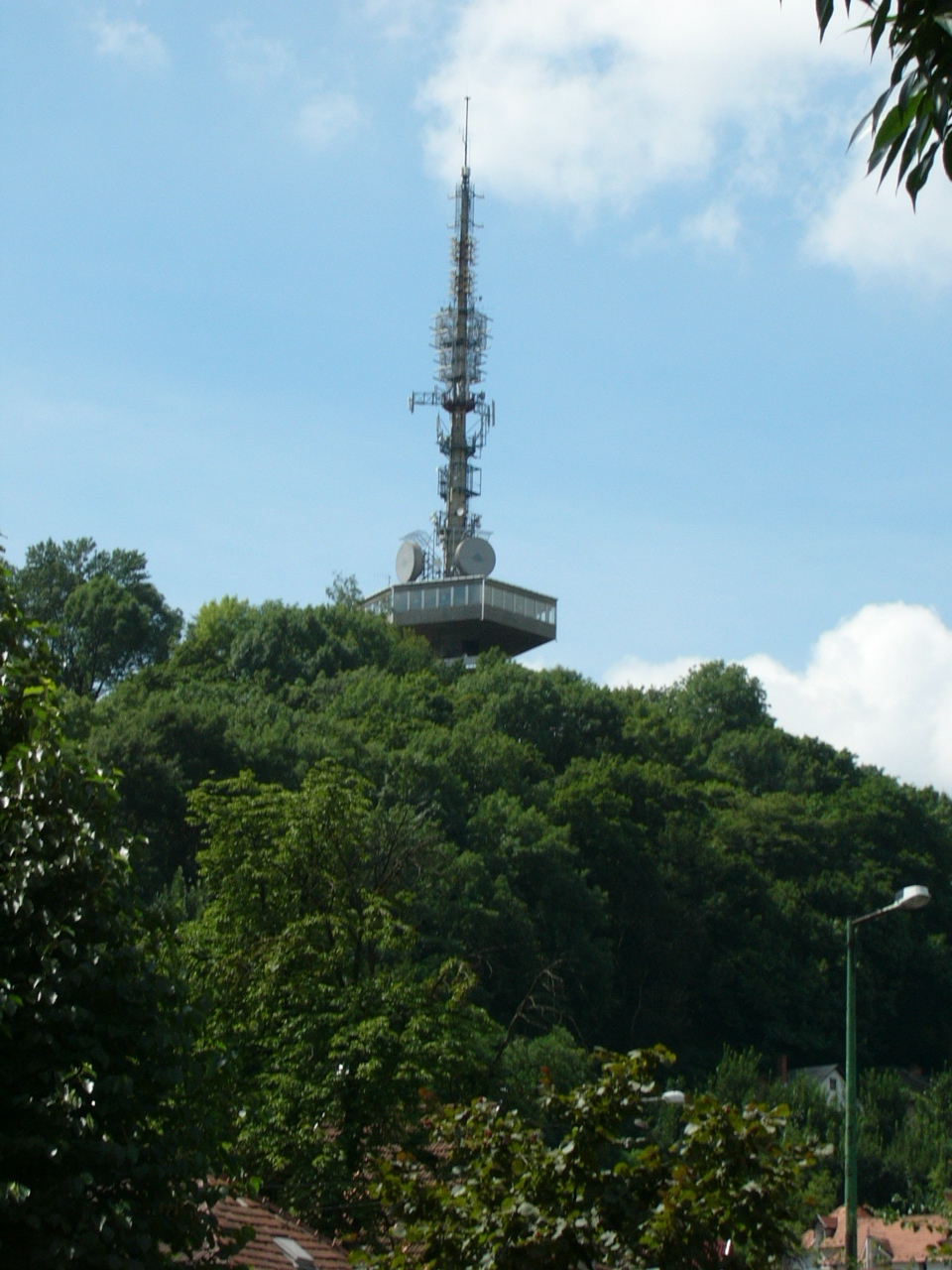
The TV tower on Avas became the symbol of the city

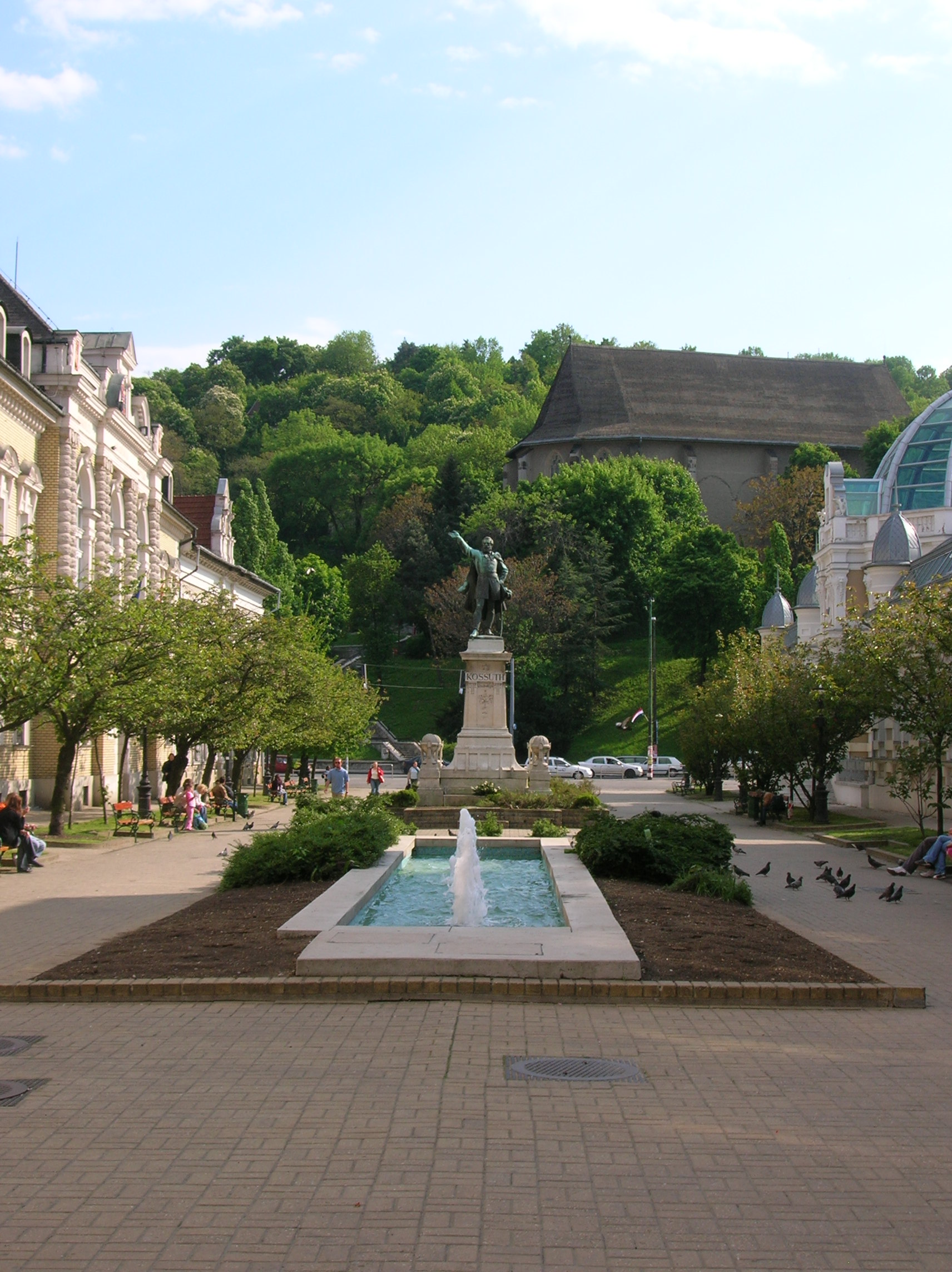
Erzsébet Square

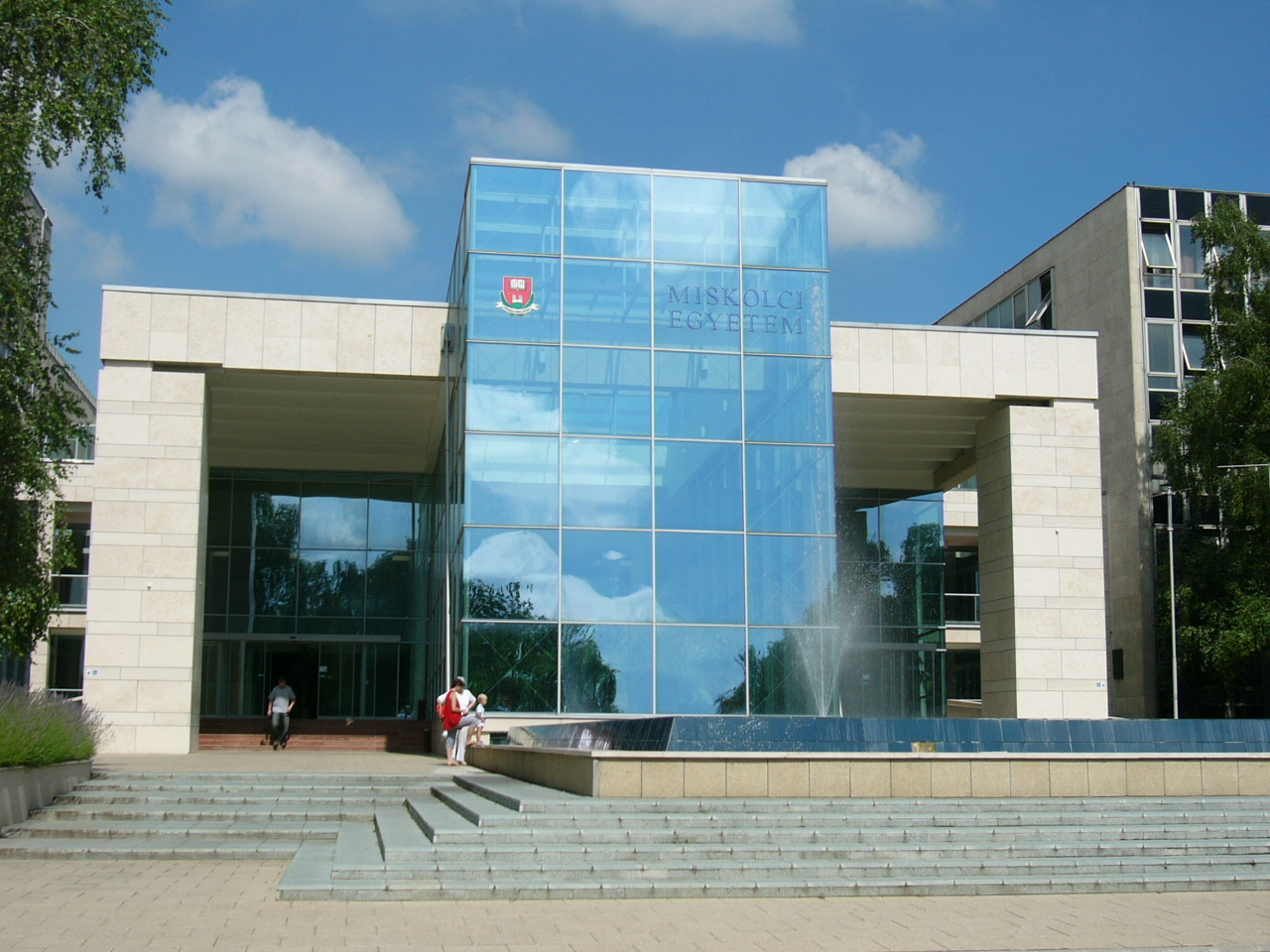
Main entrance of the University of Miskolc

== Sports ==
The most popular sport in Miskolc is football. The leading club of the city is Diósgyőri VTK (short name: DVTK). They have won the Hungarian Cup several times and represented Hungary many times in Europe. The capacity of the stadium, DVTK Stadion, is 14 655 and the stadium has under-soil heating and fully covered stands.

The other team, Miskolci VSC, plays in the county division. Miskolc has got other former first division representatives, namely Miskolci Attila (seven seasons at the highest level), and Perecesi TK (one).

=== Football teams ===
- Diósgyőri VTK
- Miskolci VSC
- Miskolci Honvéd SE
- Miskolci AK
- Perecesi TK

Miskolc's most successful women's basketball team, DKSK Miskolc MISI, has won the National Cup twice.

The DVTK Jegesmedvék ice hockey team plays in the Slovak-based Tipsport Liga. The team's home rink, Miskolc Ice Hall, is in the People's Garden downtown. It has 1 304 seats, a total capacity of 2 200, and opened in 2006.

The women's volleyball team of MVSC also plays at the highest Hungarian level.

Former motorcycle speedway team Speedway Miskolc (8 times champions of Hungary) joined the Team Speedway Polish Championship from 2006 to 2010. They won the 2007 European Speedway Club Champions' Cup with world champion Jason Crump. They were based at the Borsod Volán Stadion.

== City parts of Miskolc ==
=== Avas ===
The Avas is a hill (234 m or 768 ft) in the heart of Miskolc. On the hilltop stands the Avas lookout tower, the symbol of the city. On the northern part of the hill, close to downtown Erzsébet Square, is the Gothic Protestant Church of Avas, one of the two oldest buildings of Miskolc (the other is the Castle of Diósgyőr.) The limestone caves of Avas are used as wine cellars; the narrow, winding streets give a Mediterranean atmosphere to this part of Avas Hill. The southern part of Avas, also called Avas-South, is where the largest housing estate of the city stands, with 10-story Socialist-style concrete buildings providing homes for about one-third of the city's population.

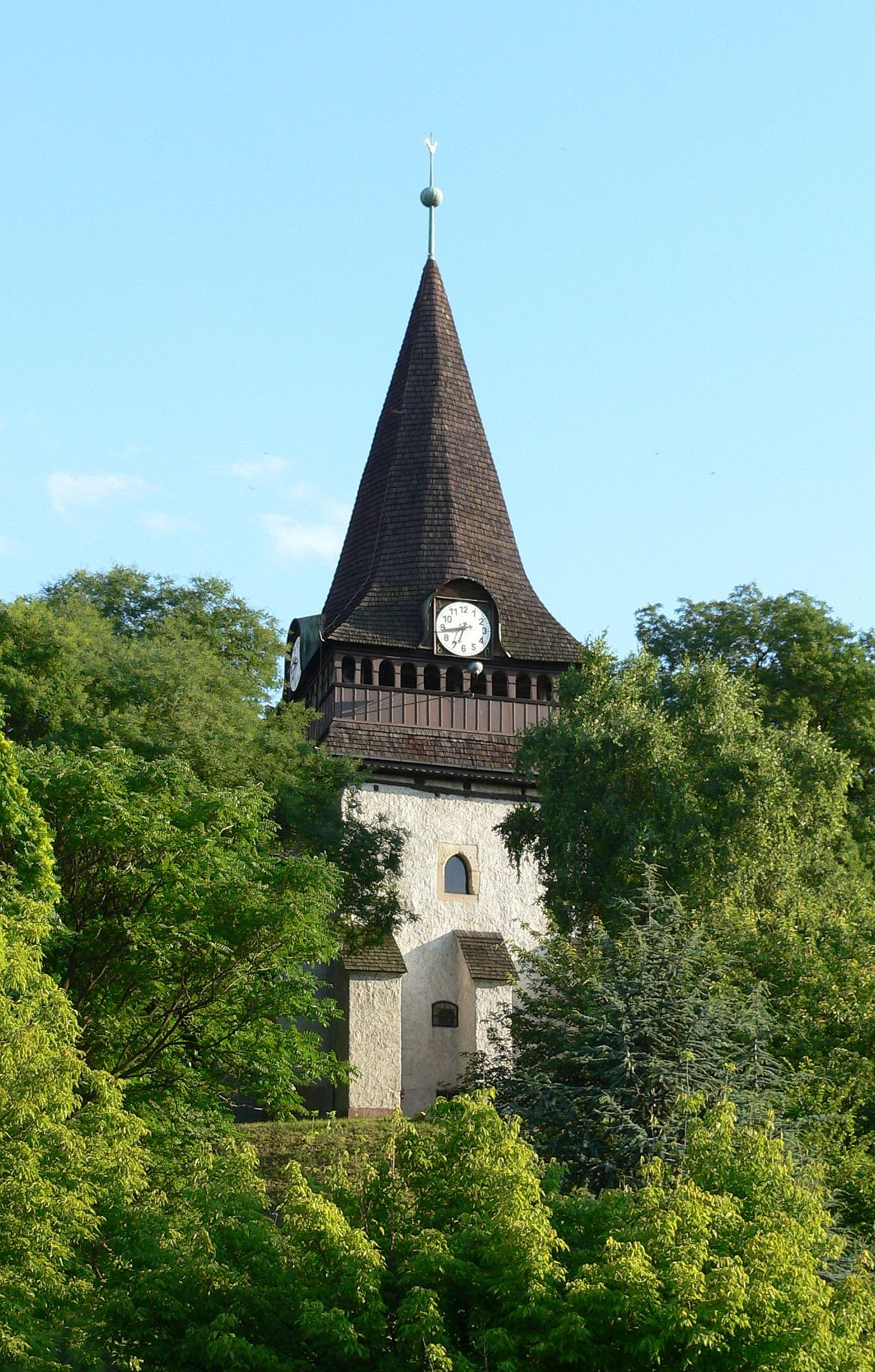
Belfry of the Gothic church

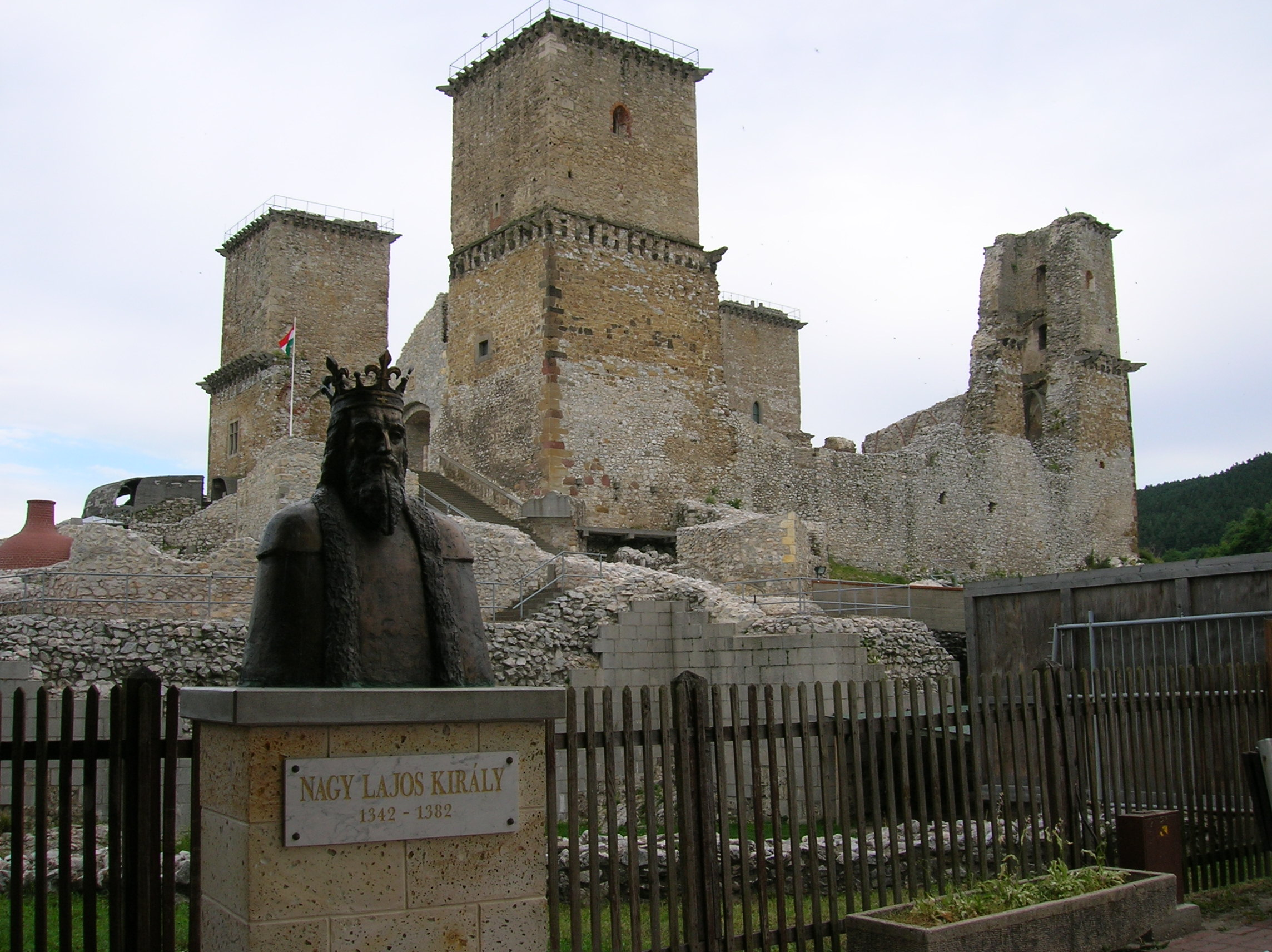
Diósgyőr Castle ruins

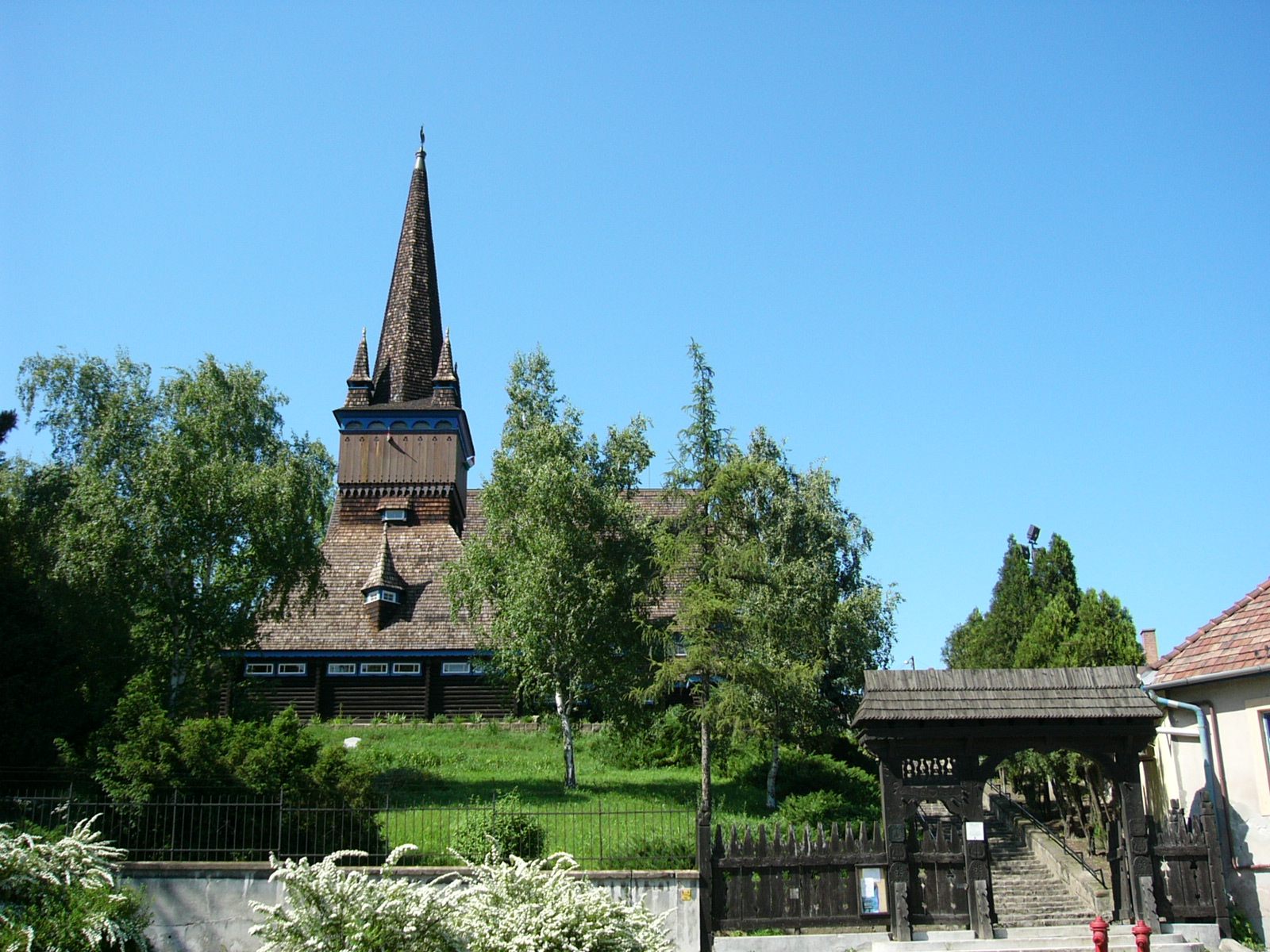
Wooden Church

=== Belváros (City centre) ===
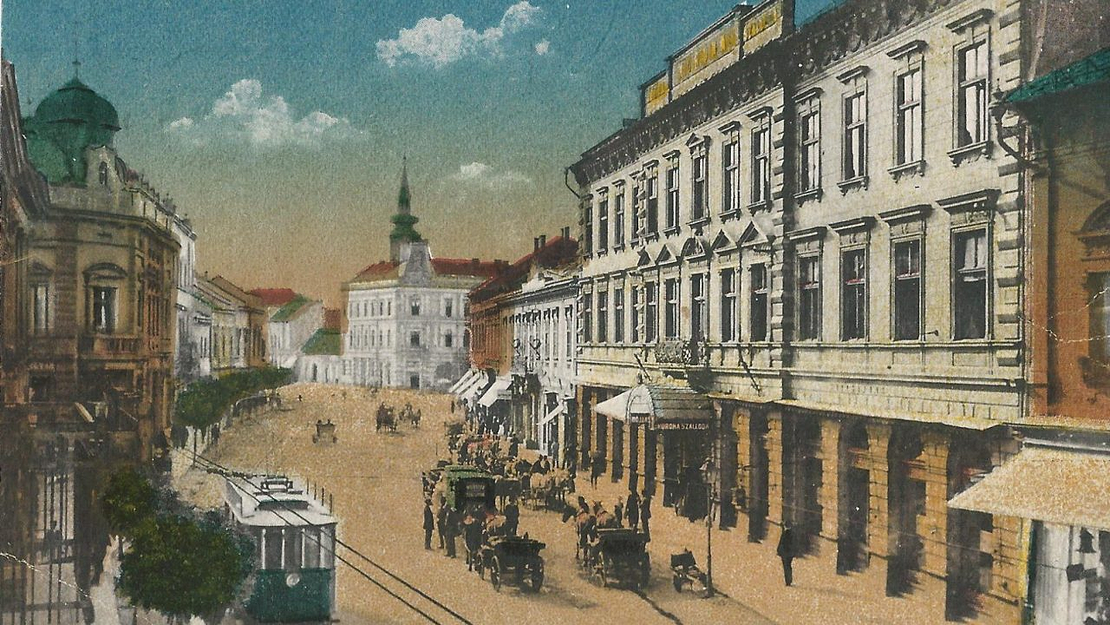
Hotel Korona

Miskolc's city centre is not as rich in monuments as that of other cities; only the Main Street (Széchenyi St.), Városház tér (City Hall Square) and Erzsébet tér (Elizabeth Square) have preserved the 19th-century style of the town. There are not only historical buildings but also modern shopping malls and offices in the city centre.

=== Csanyik ===
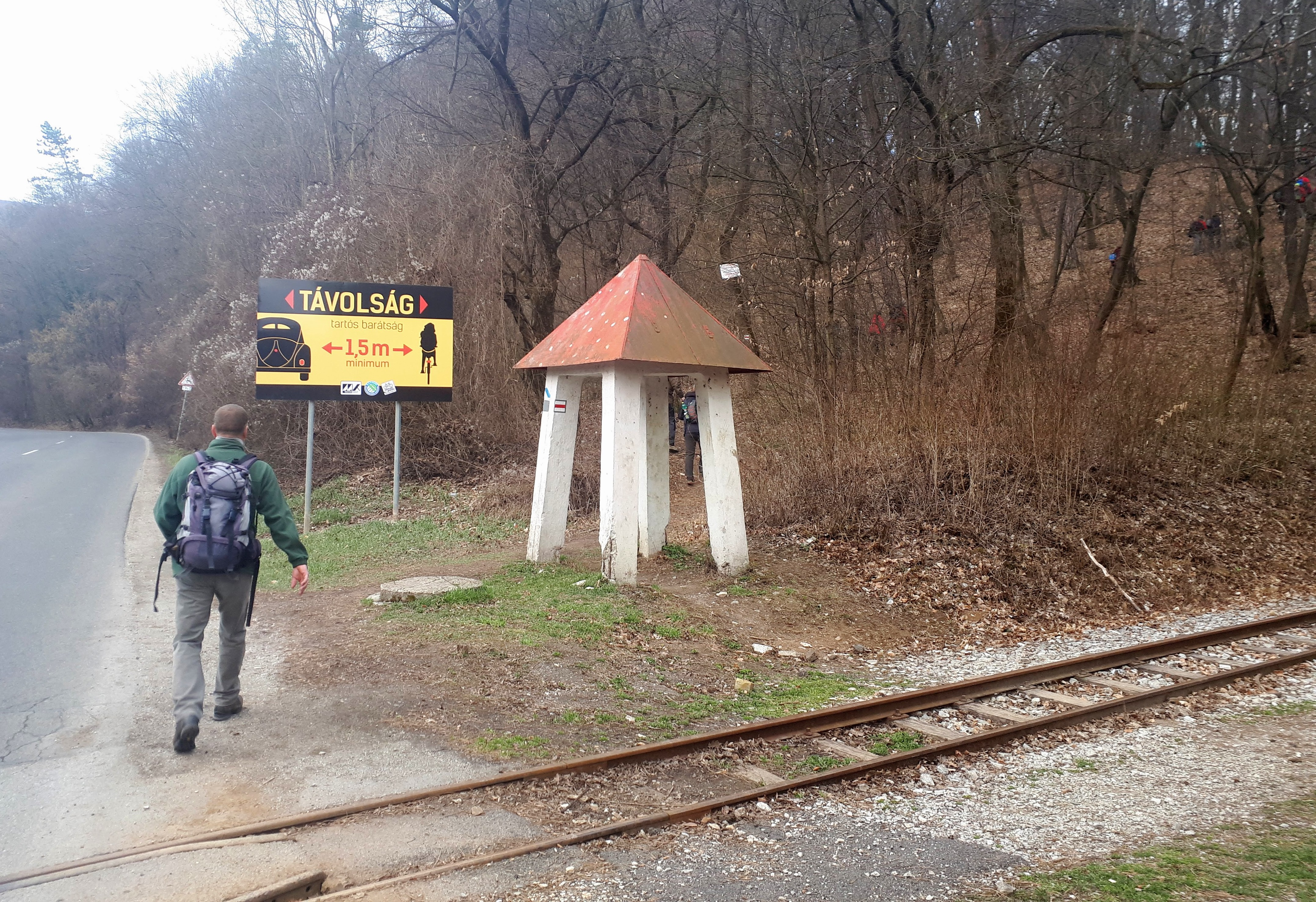
Csanyik

The Csanyik Valley, or simply Csanyik (48°07′23″N 20°38′59″E), is a valley in Miskolc, near. With an area of 105.801 m^{2} it is the second largest green area of the city after Tapolca-Hejőliget. The Csanyik Valley stream is a tributary of the Szinva. The underlying geology of the valley is largely limestone. Oak and hornbeam forest covers the slopes while alder and beech grow alongside the stream.

The valley got its name after the mediaeval village of Csenik, which was first mentioned in documents in 1313, when Palatine István donated it to the Pauline monastery of Diósgyőr that he founded. The inhabitants of the village were mainly winegrowers. The village became extinct in the late 15th to early 16th century.

The Hungarian Young Communist League established a school in the valley, which was later repurposed as a sanatorium after the fall of communism. Following the closure of the health facility, plans for a recreation centre or football academy were suggested but in 2020 the buildings were lying abandoned and falling into a state of ruin.

The Miskolc Zoo in the Csanyik opened in 1983. Along with the People's Garden, Csanyik was a popular place for the people of Miskoic to celebrate Labour Day, and 1 May festivities continue to take place. On summer holidays (e.g. on the holiday of the city, 11 May) various events are held. Special trains of the Lillafüred Forest Train railway occasionally run through the valley to Mahóca on a branch line beginning near the Diósgyőr Paper Mill.

The Csanyik valley was one of five locations chosen for a mycology field expedition by the 27th European Cortinarius Conference in 2009.

Pharmaceutical company, Sanofi has a manufacturing plant at Csanyik that received significant investment in 2016 and 2020. The factory makes single-use syringes and in 2016 had around 500 employees. Hungary's state-owned Chinoin pharmaceutical company owned the site into the 1990s. in 2018 an educational trail was laid out which loops around part of the valley, starting at the Sanofi site. The trail, formed by a partnership of St Francis Hospital, Budapest and forestry management organisation, Északerdő Zrt, supported by Sanofi, is designed especially for people with heart problems, high blood pressure and diabetes.

=== Diósgyőr ===
The other town forming today's Greater Miskolc is mostly famous for its medieval castle. Miskolc's football team also got its name from Diósgyőr, since their stadium stands there. Historical Diósgyőr is connected to Historical Miskolc by a district called Új(diós)győr (Újgyőr); its main square is an important traffic hub. Also in Új(diós)győr (Diósgyőr-Vasgyár) stands the steel factory that made Miskolc the most important heavy industrial city of Hungary (and earned it the nickname "Steel City"). Diósgyőri Gimnázium also stands in this district.

=== Egyetemváros (University Town) ===
The University of Miskolc is among the newer ones. It was founded in the 1950s, so its buildings are not old, historical ones. University Town is one of the newer parts of the city and can be found between Miskolc and the holiday resort Miskolctapolca. The university, the campus, and the sport facilities are surrounded by a large park.

=== Hejőcsaba and Görömböly ===
Two former villages that were annexed to the city in 1945 and 1950. Görömböly still looks like a small town of its own.

=== Lillafüred ===
Another holiday resort, Miskolc-Lillafüred, is a village surrounded by the Bükk mountains. Its most notable building is the Palace Hotel (Palotaszálló).

=== Martin-Kertváros ===
Martin-Kertváros (in Slovak: Martinská osada) is a suburban area.

=== Miskolctapolca ===
One of the most well-known holiday resorts in the country, Tapolca (officially Miskolctapolca or Miskolc-Tapolca to avoid confusion with the Transdanubian town of the same name) is the home of the unique Cave Bath, a natural cave with thermal water. Tapolca is quite far from the city centre and counts as one of the posh areas of Miskolc. It is a popular tourist attraction.

=== Alsóhámor, Bükkszentlászló, Felsőhámor, Ómassa, Szirma ===
These former villages were annexed to the city in 1950 (Bükkszentlászló in 1981) and are still separated villages, connected to the city only by its public transport system.

International Soldiers and Military Bands Festival.

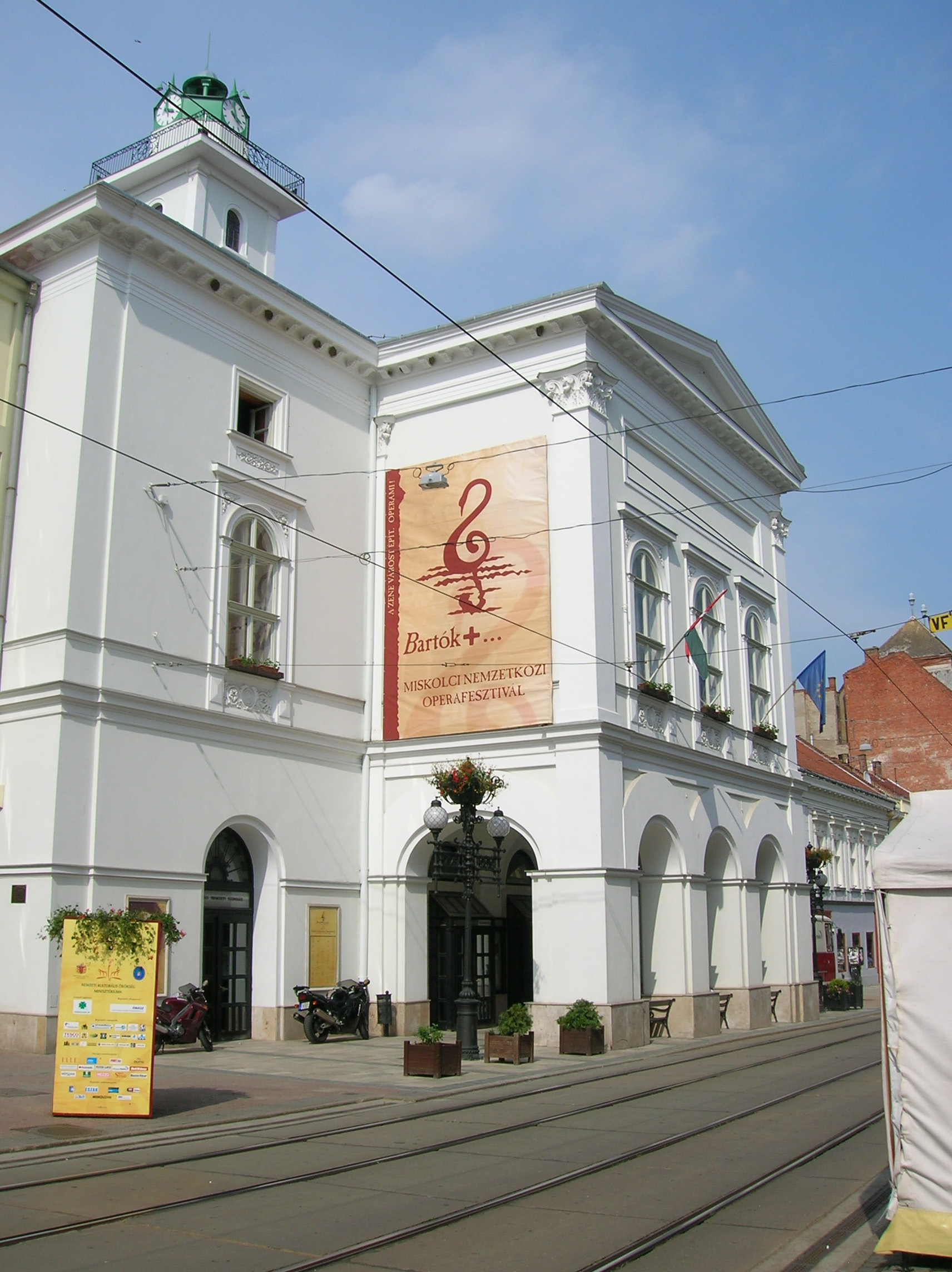
The National Theatre.

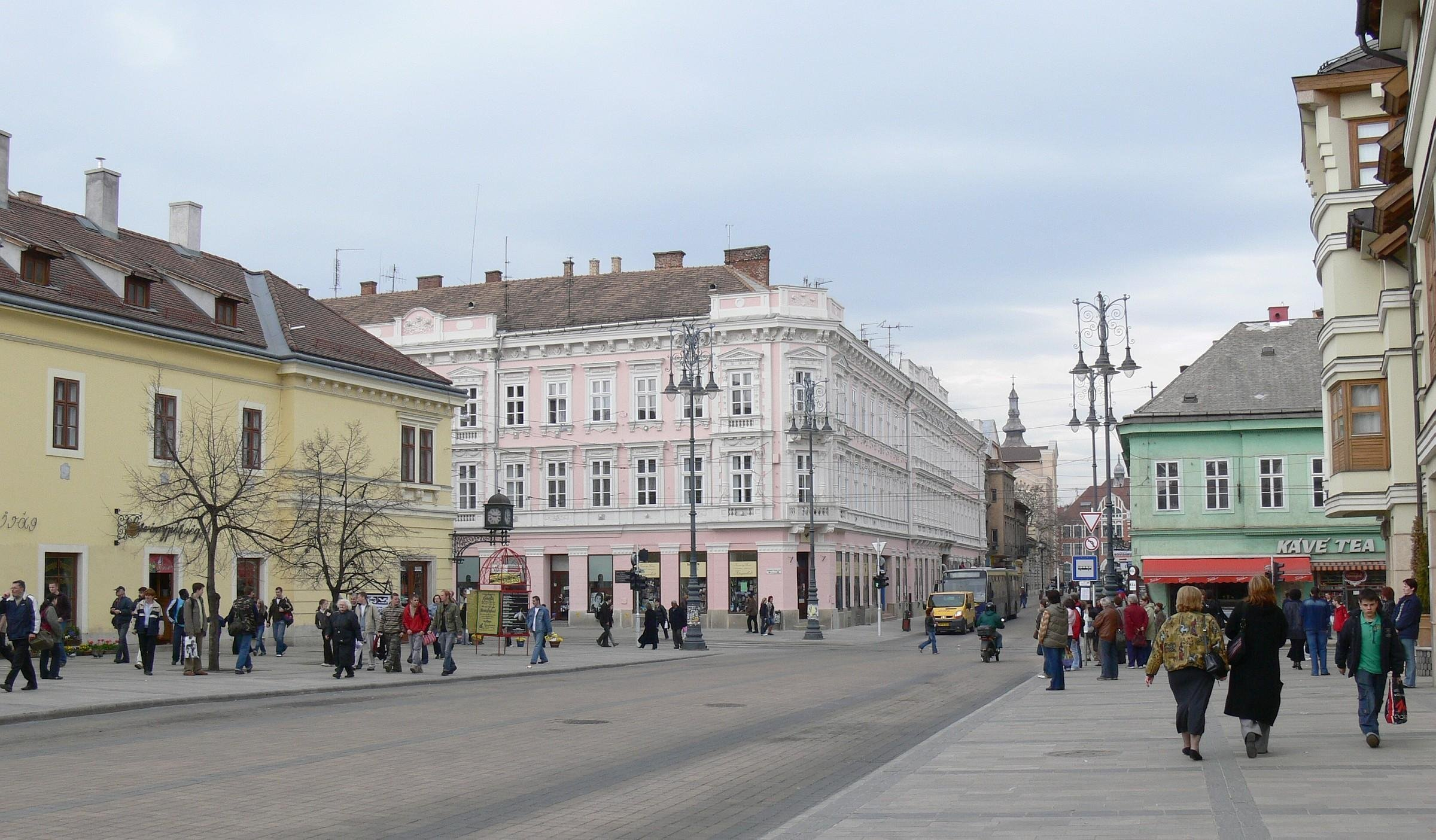
City Centre.

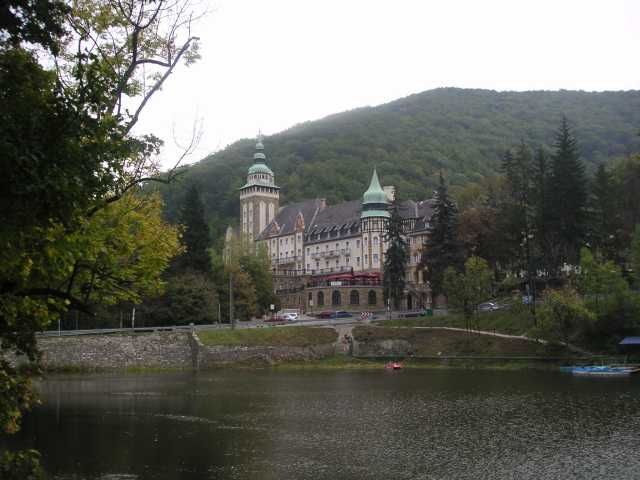
Lillafüred, Palace Hotel.

== Main sights ==
=== Downtown ===
- Main street and City Hall Square with the atmosphere of Hungarian towns of the 19th century
- Gothic Protestant Church of the Avas Hill
- Greek Orthodox Church with the largest iconostasis in Central Europe
- House of Arts with two art cinemas
- Kós House (designed by Károly Kós in Art Nouveau and folk style, 1931)
- Mindszent Church
- Minorite Church and Heroes' Square
- Miskolc-Avas TV Tower
- National Theatre of Miskolc
- Csodamalom Puppet Theatre
- Ottó Herman Museum
- Palace of Music
- Wooden Church

=== Diósgyőr ===
- Castle of Diósgyőr (built in the 13th century, had its prime during the reign of Louis the Great; medieval castle plays are held in every August)
- Lutheran church of Diósgyőr
- Protestant church of Diósgyőr (Baroque, built on the ruins of a mediaeval monastery)

=== Lillafüred ===
- Anna Cave, István Cave, Szeleta Cave
- Hotel Palace
- Lake Hámori
- Trout Farm
- Waterfalls (the highest one in Hungary)

There is a narrow-gauge railway that connects Lillafüred to Miskolc known as the Lillafüredi Állami Erdei Vasút (Lillafüred Forest State Railway). It winds through scenic forests, and takes between a half hour and 45 minutes for the train to go between the two major stops. The Miskolc stop is located in Diósgyőr.

=== Miskolctapolca ===
- Cave Bath of Miskolctapolca

=== Near to the city ===
- Bánkút ski resort
- Bükk Mountains
- Miskolc Zoo
- Ruins of the monastery at Szentlélek
- Castell Earl Andrassy Tiszadob

=== Festivals ===
- Diósgyőr Castle Plays (every May and August)
- International Soldiers and Military Bands Festival (every two years in August)
- Jelly festival (February)
- Miskolc Opera Festival (every summer)
- Miskolc International Film Festival (every September)

== Schools ==
- Avasi Grammar School
- Ferenc Földes Secondary School
- Kossuth Lajos Lutheran Grammar School and Pedagogical Secondary School
- Lévay József Református Gimnázium és Diákotthon
- Béla Bartók Music High School
- Zrínyi Ilona Grammar School
- Fáy András Economic High School
- Berzeviczy Gergely School of Trade and Catering

== Public transport ==
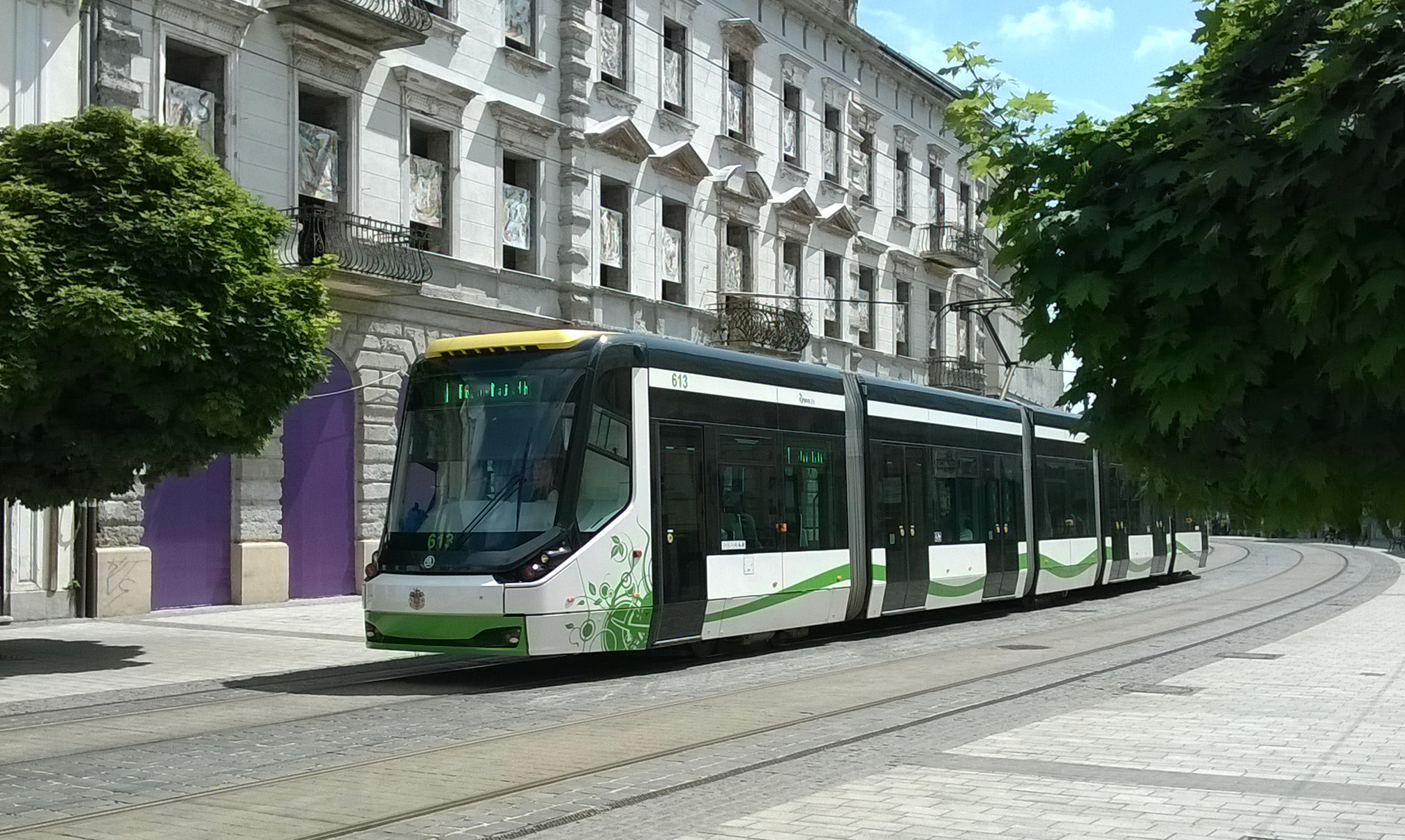
Skoda Tram in Miskolc

Public transport in Miskolc is provided by the company MVK Zrt., owned by the local government. There are 36 bus lines and 2 tram lines. The first tram entered service on 10 July 1897 (making Miskolc the third city in Hungary to have a tram line), the first scheduled bus line started on 8 June 1903 (first in the country as well.) Today the public transport of Miskolc is one of the best ones in Hungary. There are several taxi companies too.

The Lillafüred Forest Train connects Diósgyőr to Lillafüred. It is mainly a tourist attraction.

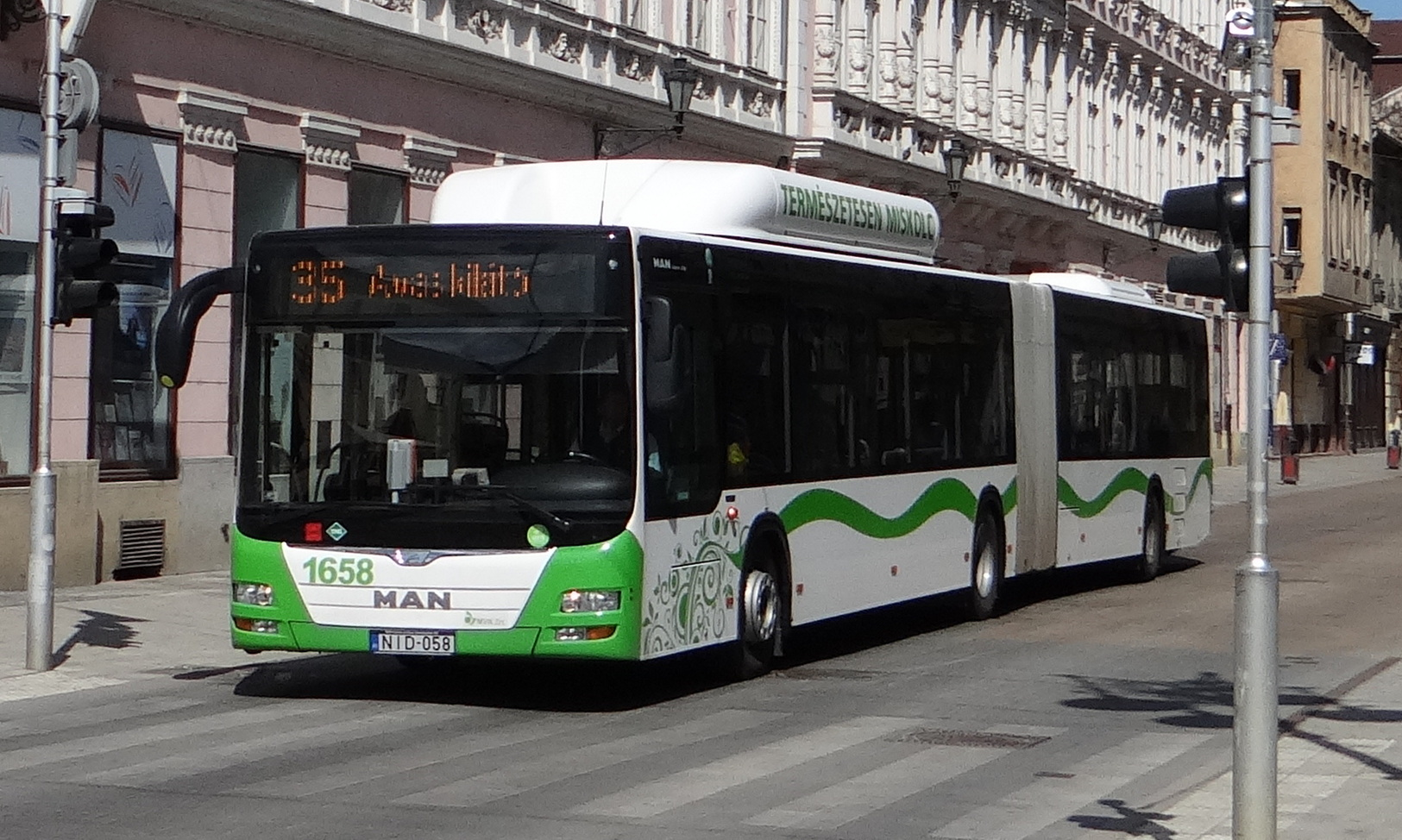
MAN Lion's City CNG on Line 35 (Avas kilátó-Centrum) in Miskolc

The city has two railway stations (Tiszai and Gömöri) and a small unpaved airport, which is not open to the public, used mainly as a sports facility and has no role in public transport since 1963.

== Politics ==
The current mayor of Miskolc is Pál Veres (Independent).

The local Municipal Assembly, elected at the 2019 local government elections, is made up of 28 members (1 Mayor, 19 Individual constituencies MEPs and 8 Compensation List MEPs) divided into this political parties and alliances:

| Party | Seats | Current Municipal Assembly |
|---|---|---|
| Opposition coalition (Note: Coalition of Függetlenek SZIVE-MSZP-Momentum-Dialogue-Jobbik-LMP-DK-Mindenki Magyarországa-Velünk a Város.) | 16 | M |
| Fidesz-KDNP | 10 | |
| Our Homeland Movement | 1 | |
| New Impetus for Miskolc | 1 | |

=== List of mayors ===
List of City Mayors from 1990:

| Member | Party | Term of office |
|---|---|---|
| Tamás Csoba | SZDSZ | 1990–1993 |
| Ildikó T. Asztalos | SZDSZ | 1993–1994 |
| Tamás Kobold | KDNP | 1994–2002 |
| Sándor Káli | MSZP | 2002–2010 |
| Ákos Kriza | Fidesz | 2010–2019 |
| Pál Veres | Independent | 2019–2024 |
| Tóth-Szántai József | Fidesz-KDNP | 2024– |

== Notable individuals ==
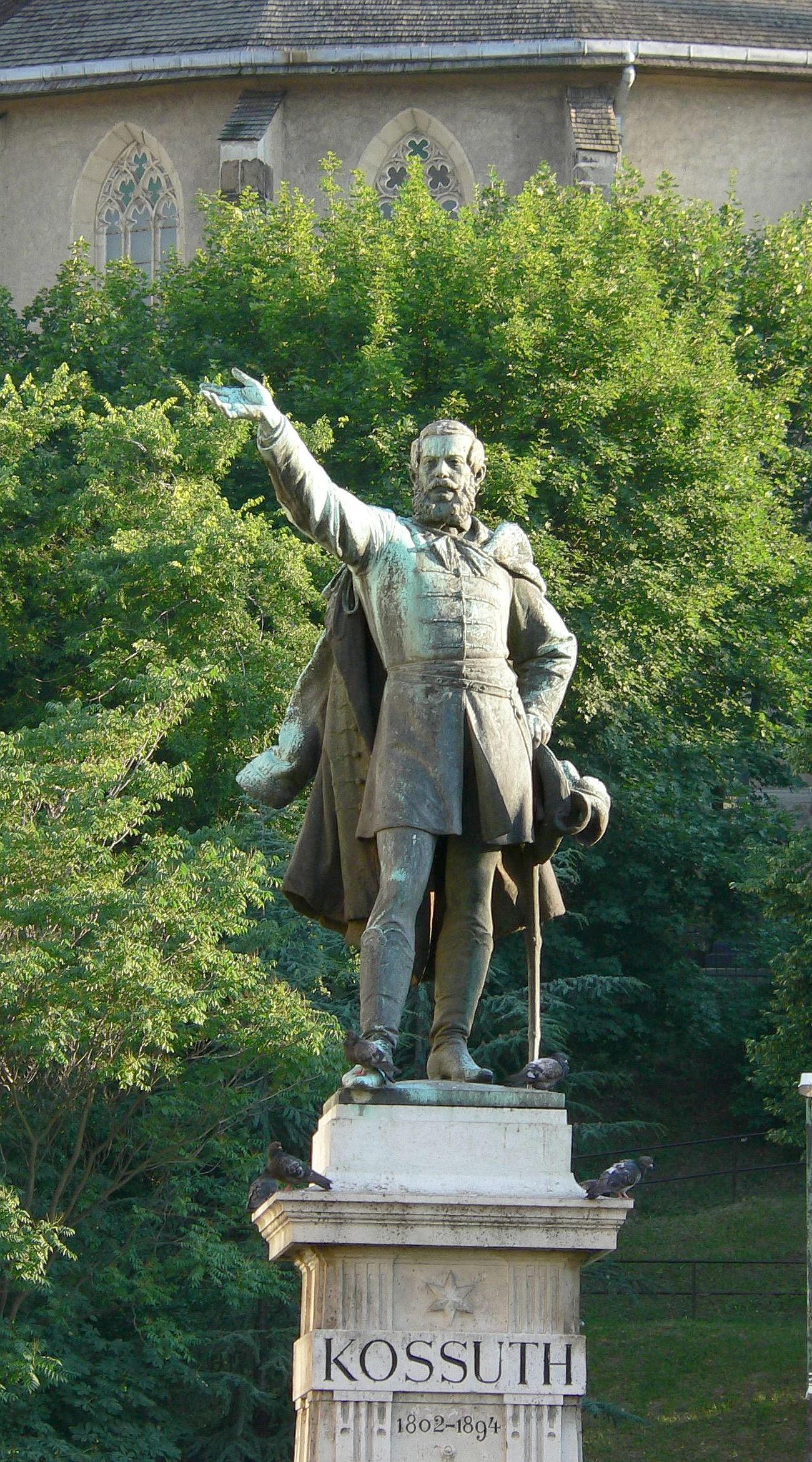
Lajos Kossuth

Including people born in Miskolc as well as in Diósgyőr and other city parts that were independent towns at the time of their birth.

- Bela Borsody Bevilaqua (1885–1962) Cultural historian
- Péter Biros (born 1976) water polo player
- Gizella Bodnár, "Airplane Gizi" (1926-2019) thief
- Alan A. Brown (1928–2010) economist
- Gábor Dayka (1769–1796) poet
- Ferenc Demjén (born 1941) singer
- Sándor Ferenczi (1873–1933) psychoanalyst
- Dezső Földes (1880–1950) 2x Olympic champion saber fencer
- Lili Hajdú Gimesné (1891–1960), psychiatrist and psychoanalyst
- Endre Granat (born 1937) violinist
- Alexander Grossmann (1909–2003) Swiss writer, journalist
- Károly Grósz (1930–1996) politician, president
- Dezső Gyarmati (1927–2013) water polo player
- Szabolcs Huszti (born 1983) football player
- Márk Jedlóczky (born 1999) racing driver
- István Jónyer (born 1950) table tennis player
- Máté Kamarás (born 1976) singer and actor
- Tamás Pál Kiss (born 1991), racing driver
- Julius Leopold Klein (1810–1876) German writer
- Róza Laborfalvi (1817–1886) actress
- László Lehoczki (1958–2025) civil defense rescuer
- Regina Margareten (1863–1959) businesswoman
- Dénes Pál (born 1991), singer
- László Palóczy (1783–1861) politician
- Emeric Pressburger (1902–1988) Academy Award–winning movie director/writer/producer
- Sándor Puhl (1955–2021) football referee
- Ladislau Raffinsky (1905–1981), Romanian football player
- Ede Reményi (1828–1898) violinist
- Attila Repka (born 1968) wrestler, Olympic champion
- Sándor Rónai (1892–1965) politician, president
- Anna Rudolf (born 1987) chess player, international master, evangelist and reporter, a.k.a. Miss Strategy
- Andrei Șaguna (1809–1873) Romanian political leader, Orthodox Metropolitan bishop of Transylvania
- Vera Schmidt (born 1982) singer-songwriter
- Júlia Sebestyén (born 1981) figure skater, European champion
- Lőrinc Szabó (1900–1957) poet
- Zsolt Szabó (born 1995) racing driver
- Norbert Tóth (born 1998) racing driver
- Vilmos Vanczák (born 1983) footballer
- Bálint Vécsei, (born 1993) footballer

=== Lived in Miskolc ===
- Ferenc Bessenyei (Hódmezővásárhely, 1919 – Lajosmizse, 2004) actor
- Béni Egressy (Sajókazinc, 1814 – Budapest, 1851) composer
- Ottó Herman (Breznóbánya, 1835 – Miskolc, 1914) ornithologist, archaeologist, ethnographer
- Pavol Országh Hviezdoslav (Felsőkubin, 1849 – Dolny Kubín, 1921) Slovak poet
- Margit Kaffka (Nagykároly, 1880 – Budapest, 1918) writer
- Teréz Karacs (Budapest, 1808 – Békés, 1892) pioneer in women's education
- Béla Kondor (Pestlőrinc, 1931 – Budapest, 1972) graphic artist
- Leo Lánczy (Pest, 1852 – Budapest, 1921) deputy
- Ferenc Pulszky (Eperjes, 1814 – Budapest, 1897) politician, archaeologist, writer
- Bertalan Szemere (Vatta, 1818 – Budapest, 1869) politician
- Illés Trangus (Sabinov, 1704 – Miskolc, 1761) physician

== Gallery ==
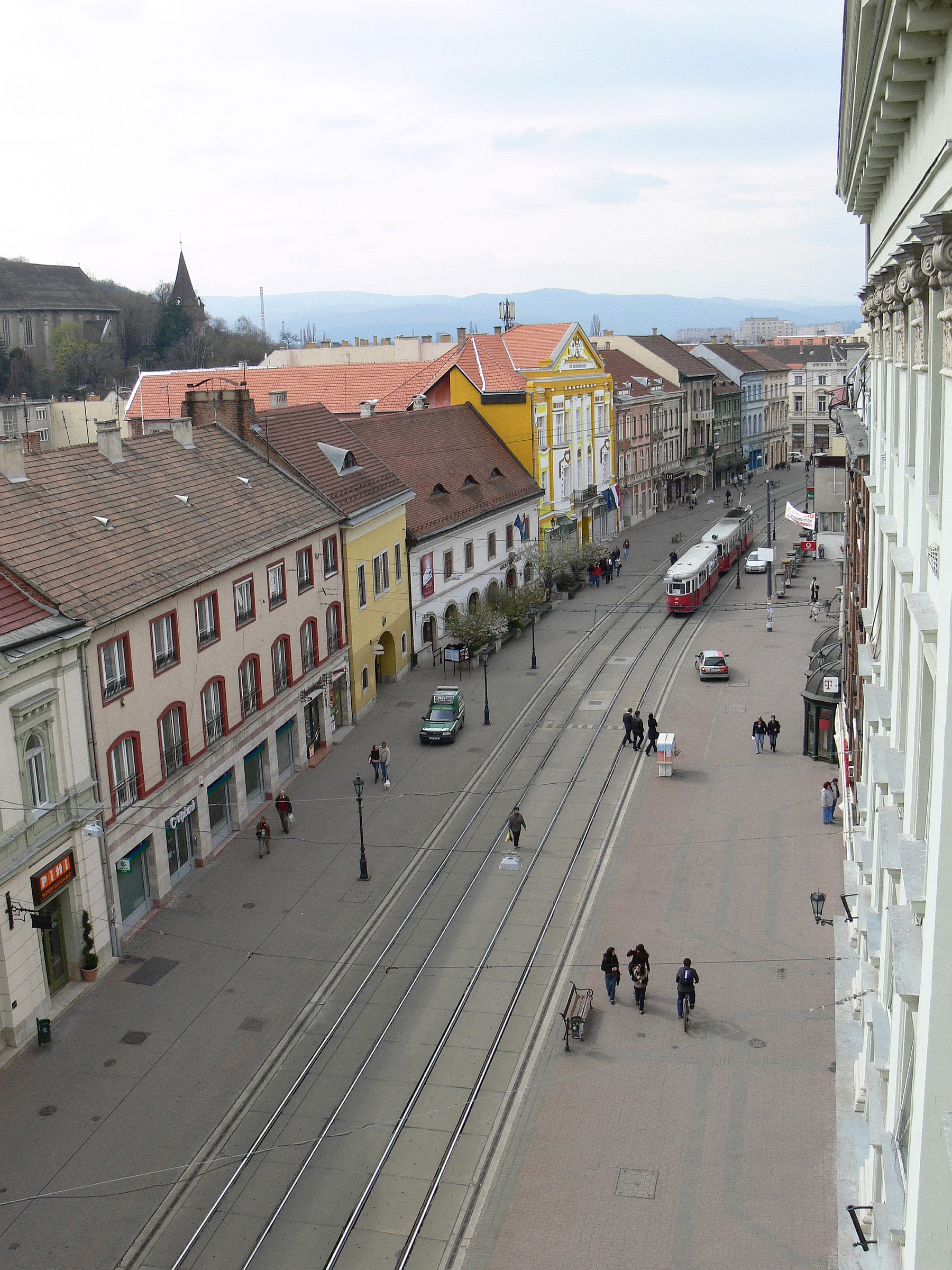
Downtown

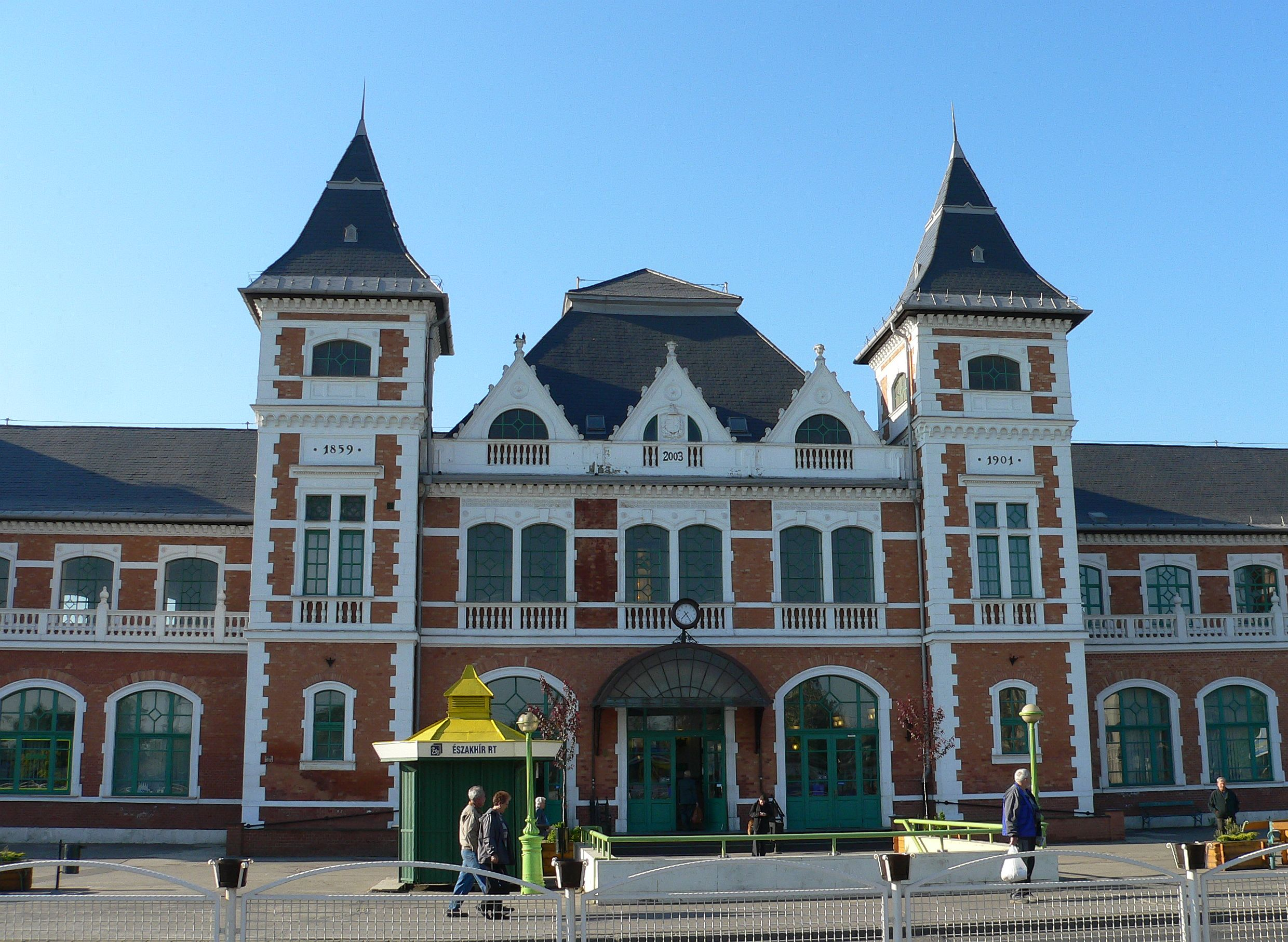
Tiszai Railway Station

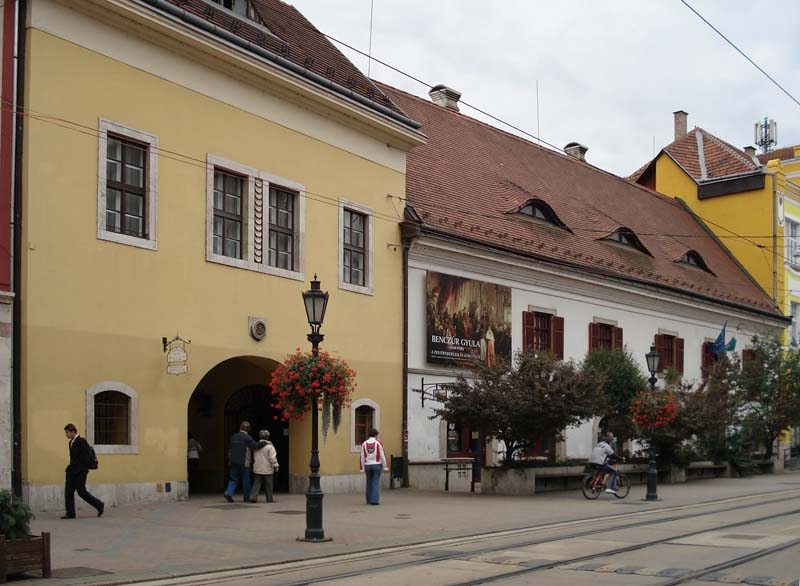
Dark Gate and Gallery of Miskolc

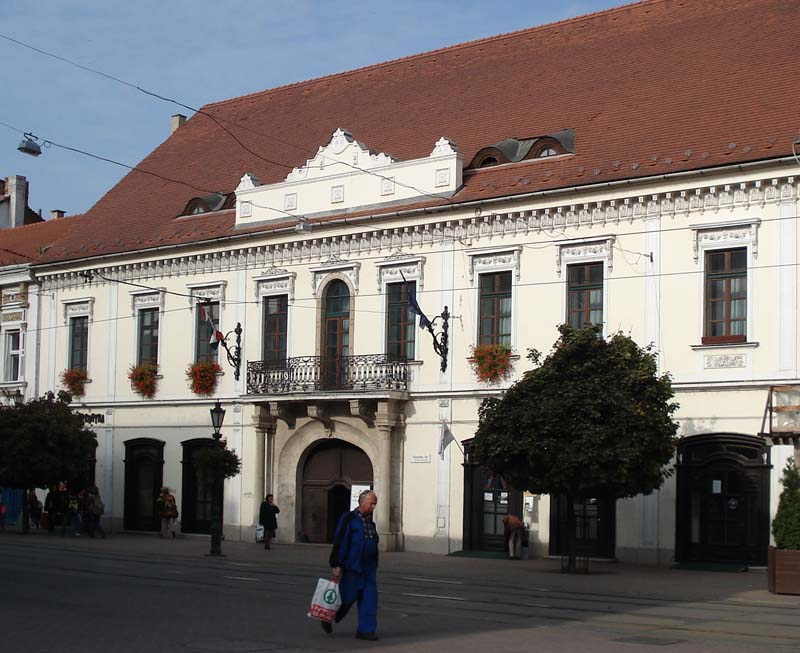
Almássy Mansion

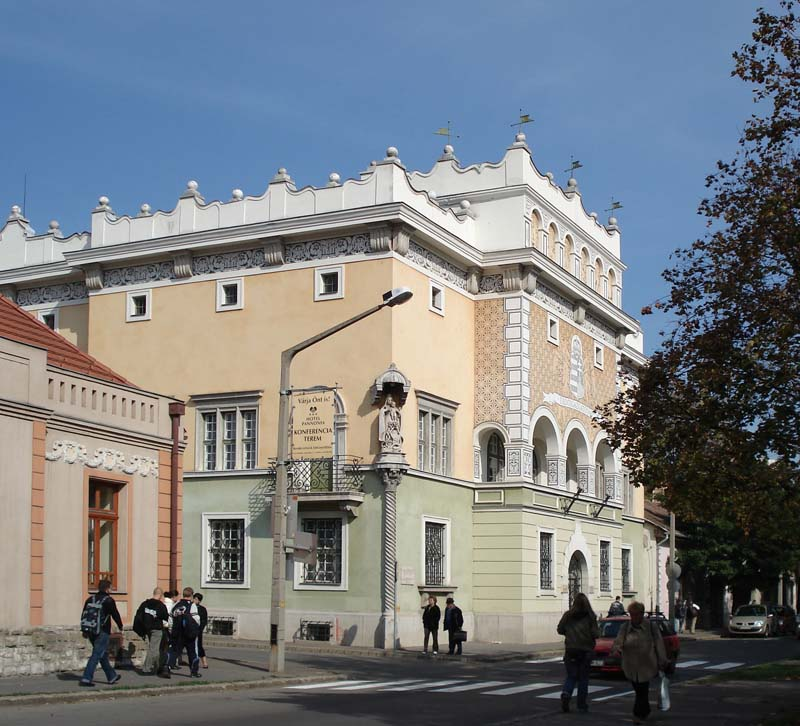
Forestry Headquarters

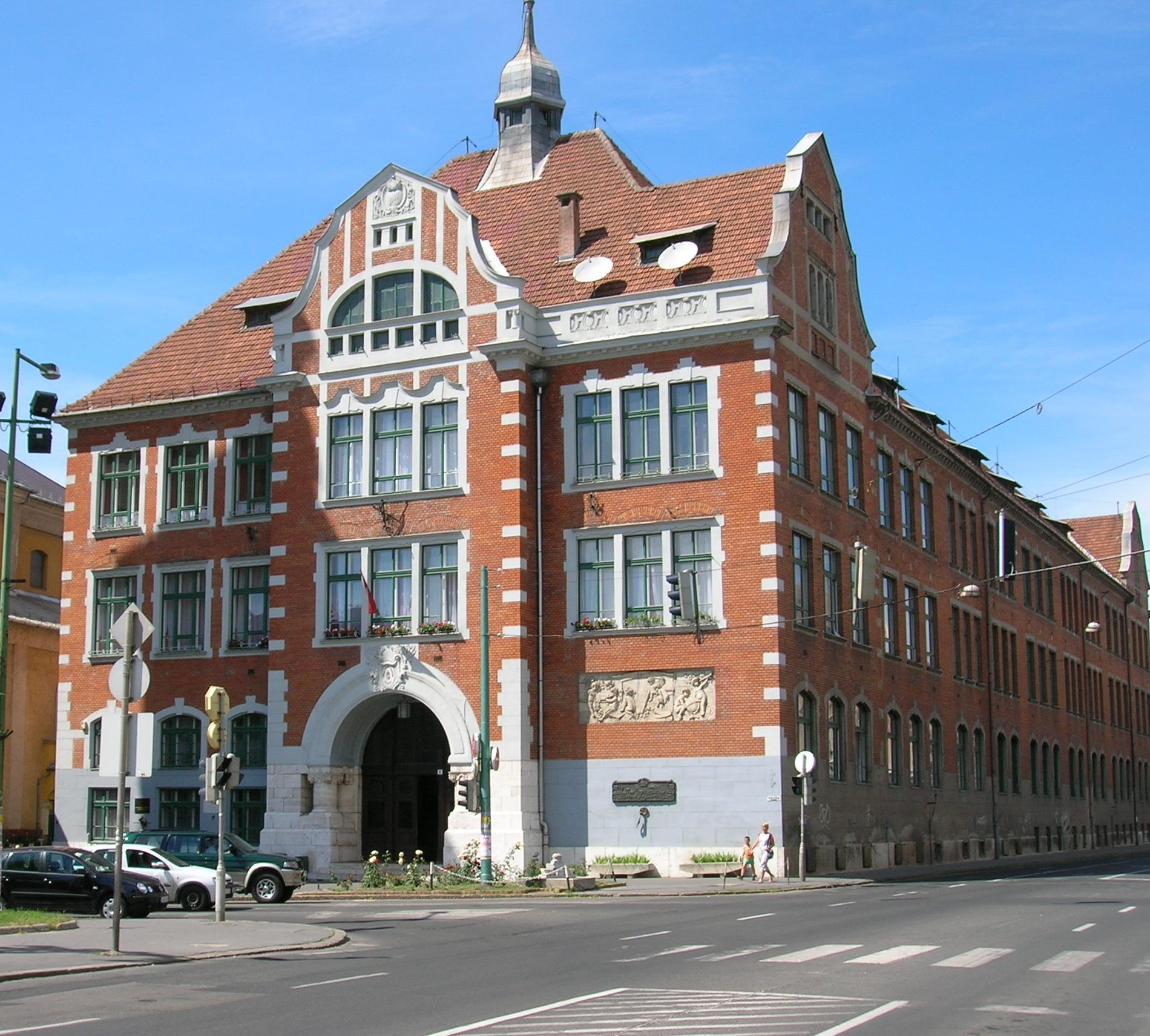
Ferenc Földes Secondary School

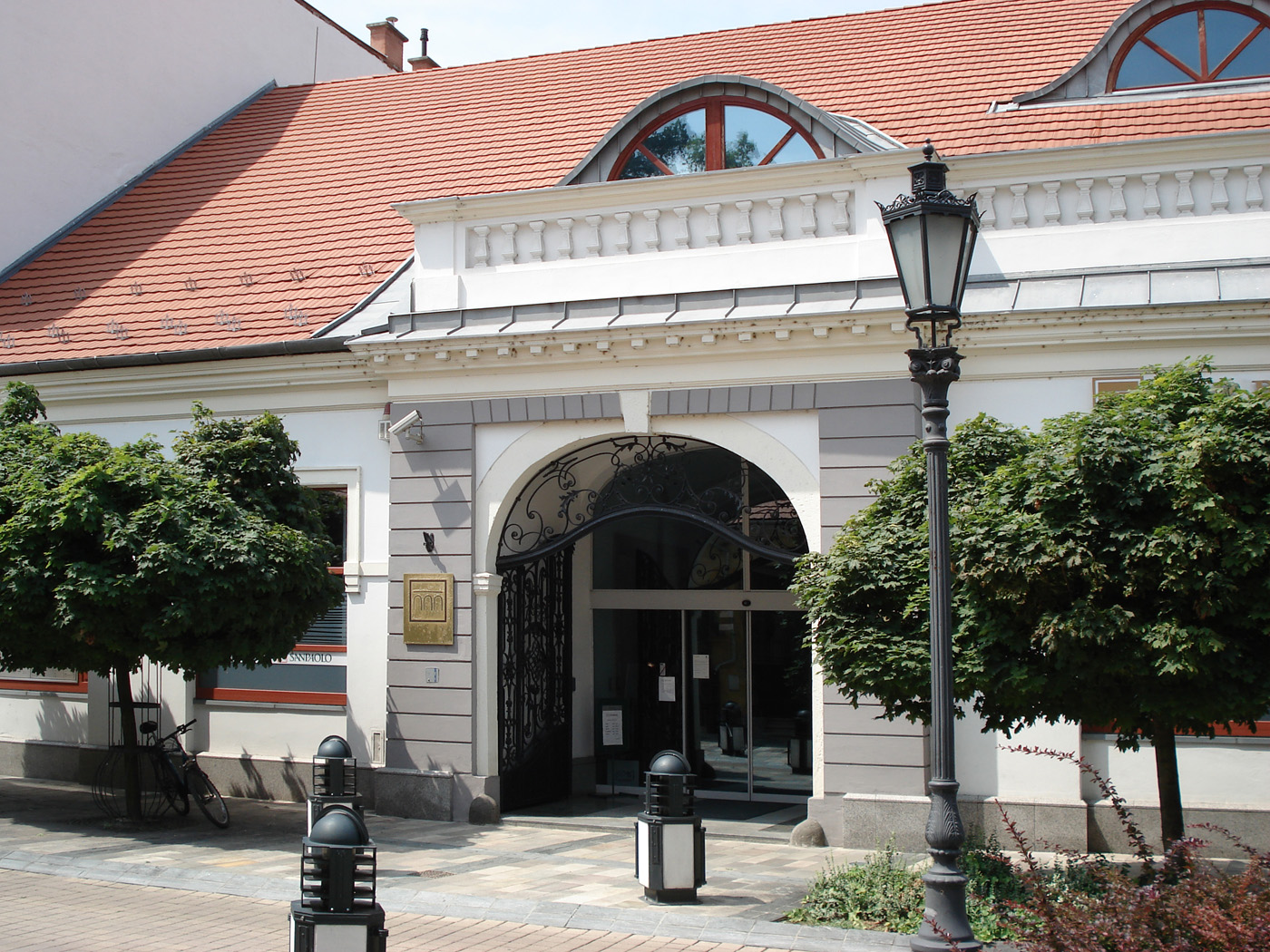
Former Post Office

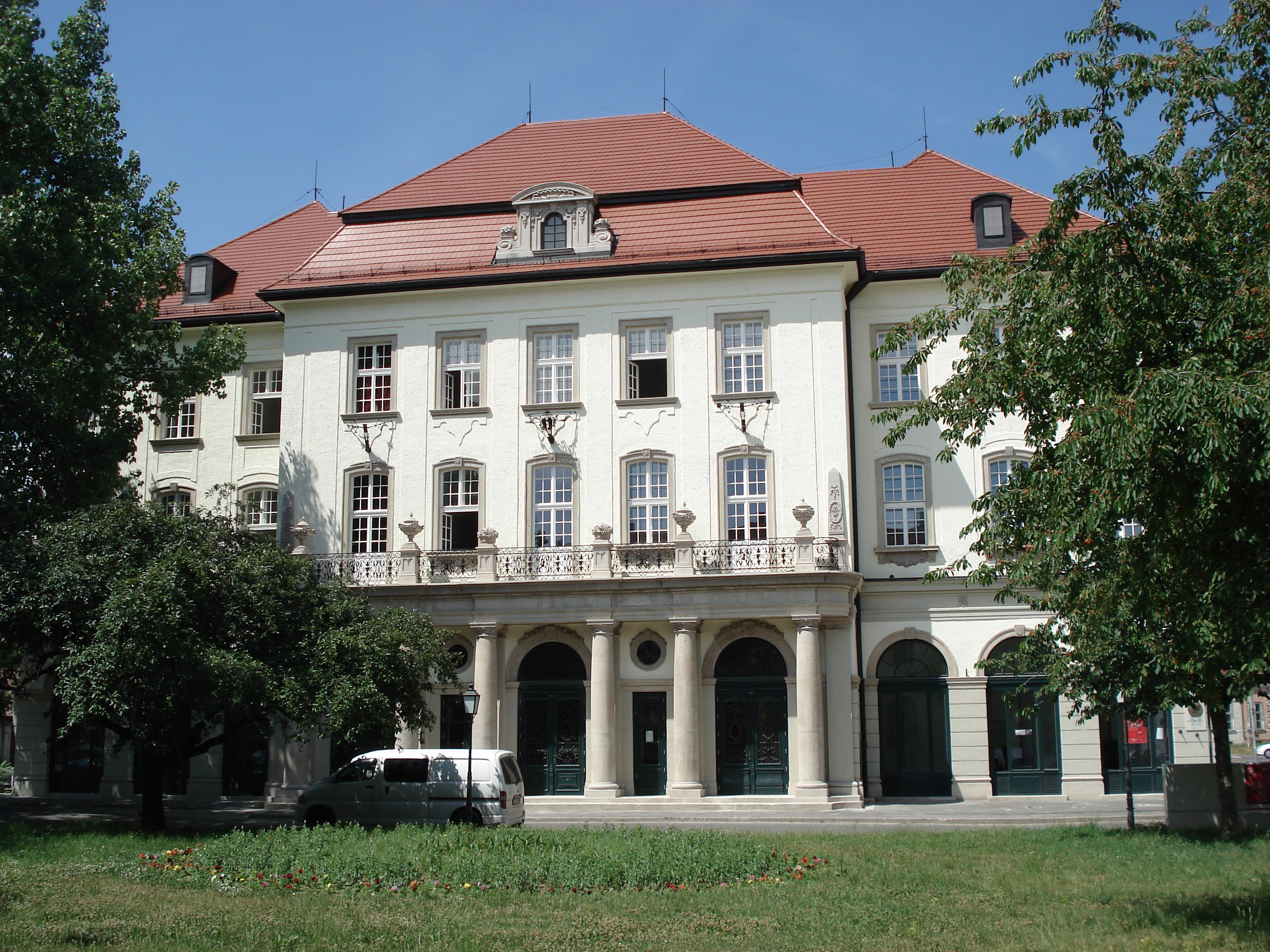
Palace of Music

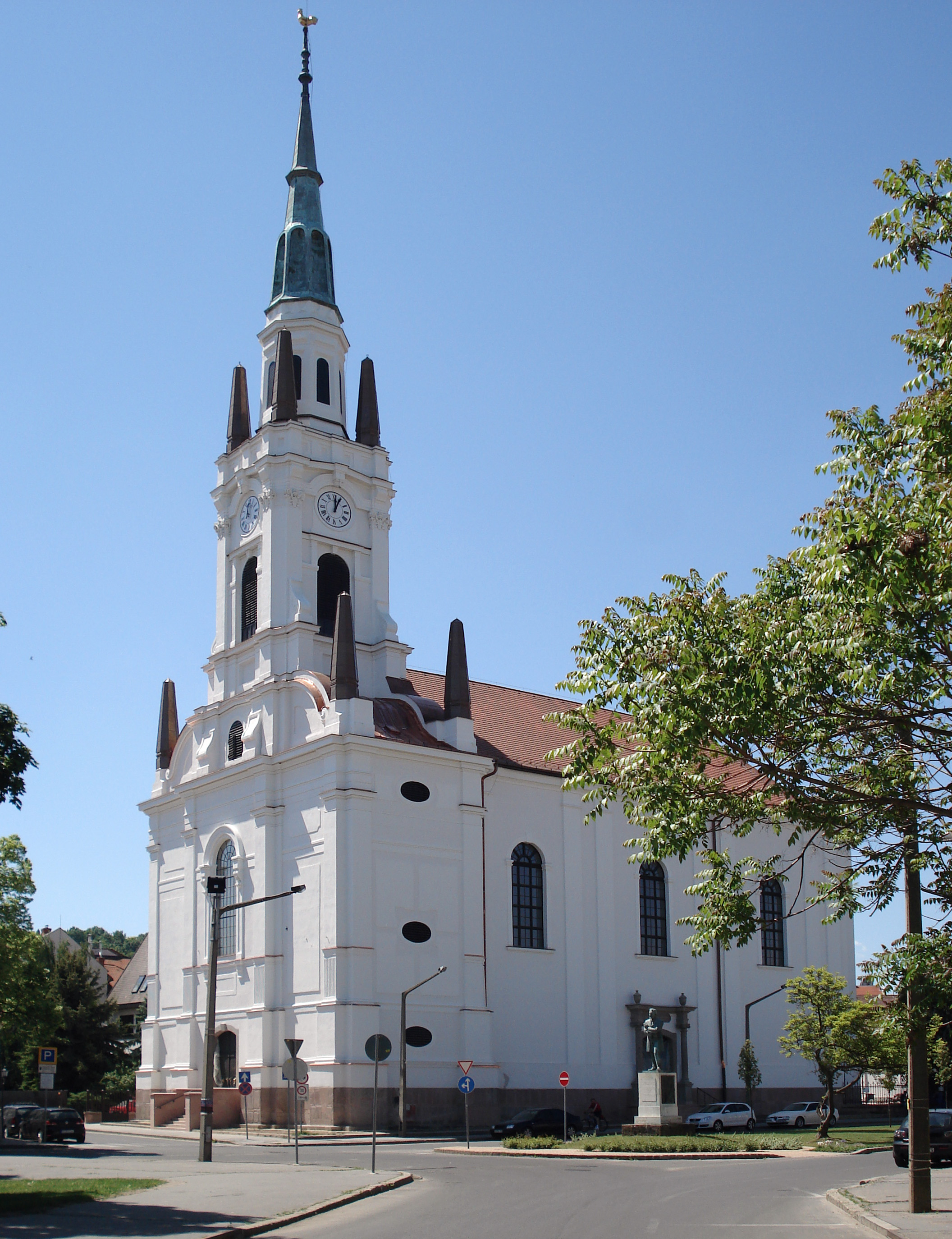
Reformed Church

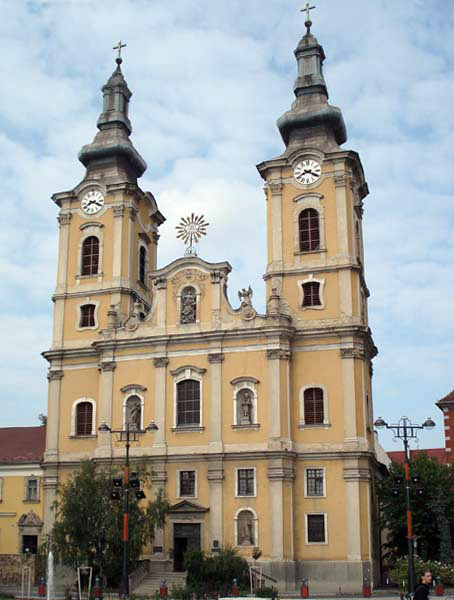
Minorite Church

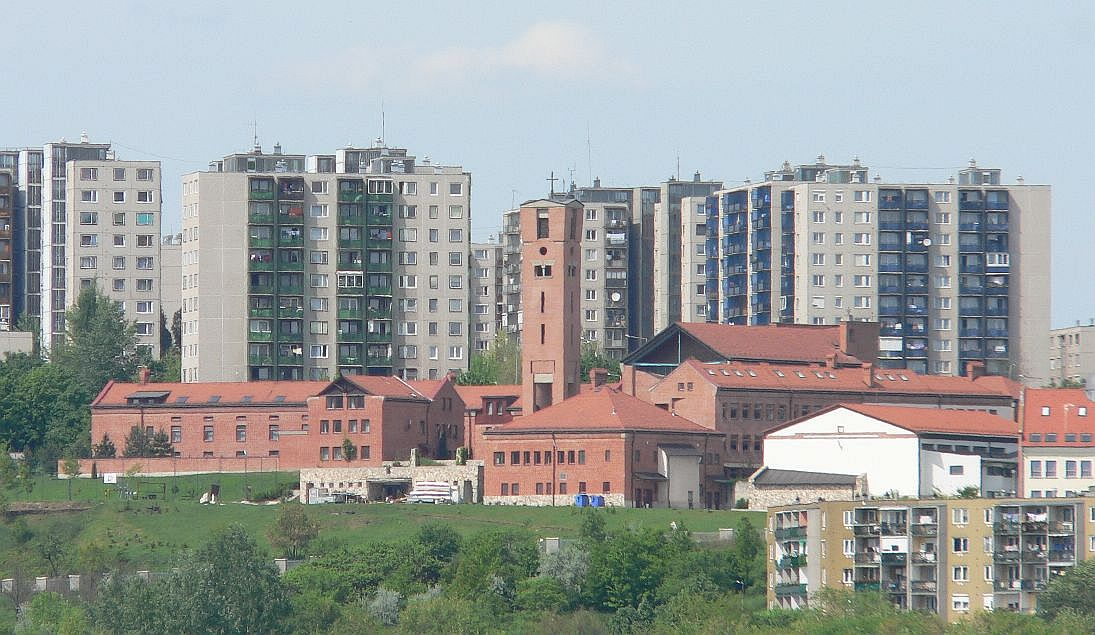
Avas

== Twin towns – sister cities ==
Miskolc is twinned with:

- Asan, South Korea
- Aschaffenburg, Germany
- Burgas, Bulgaria
- Cleveland, United States
- Katowice, Poland
- Kayseri, Turkey
- Košice, Slovakia
- Ostrava, Czech Republic
- Tampere, Finland
- Yantai, China

== See also ==
- Outline of Hungary
- Avasi Grammar School
- Miskolc metropolitan area

== References and notes ==
Notes
