= Holiday of the City of Miskolc =

Local holiday in Hungary

11 May is the official holiday of the city of Miskolc, Hungary. The city's council proclaimed this day as a holiday in 1992 and it was first celebrated in 1993. It is the anniversary of the granting of the coat of arms of Miskolc in 1909 by King Franz Joseph.

By tradition several awards are awarded on this day in the National Theatre of Miskolc. Many of these awards are named after famous citizens.

== The awards ==
- Honorary Citizen of Miskolc
- Pro Urbe Award
- Ignác Gálffy Award
- Lőrinc Szabó Literary Award
- Ede Reményi Music Award
- Béla Kondor Art Award
- Mrs Déry Theatre Award
- Bertalan Szemere Public Life Award
- Ottó Herman Scientific Award
- Pedagogical Award
- Athlete of the Year
- City of Miskolc Architecture Award
- Samuel Benkő Award
- Niveau Award
- "Civil Organisation of the Year" Award
- "Support to Civilians" Award
- "Sports in the City of Miskolc" Award
- "Tourism in the City of Miskolc" Award
- Szentpáli Award
