= Miskolc Zoo =

Coordinates: 48°07′26.34″N 20°39′22.74″E

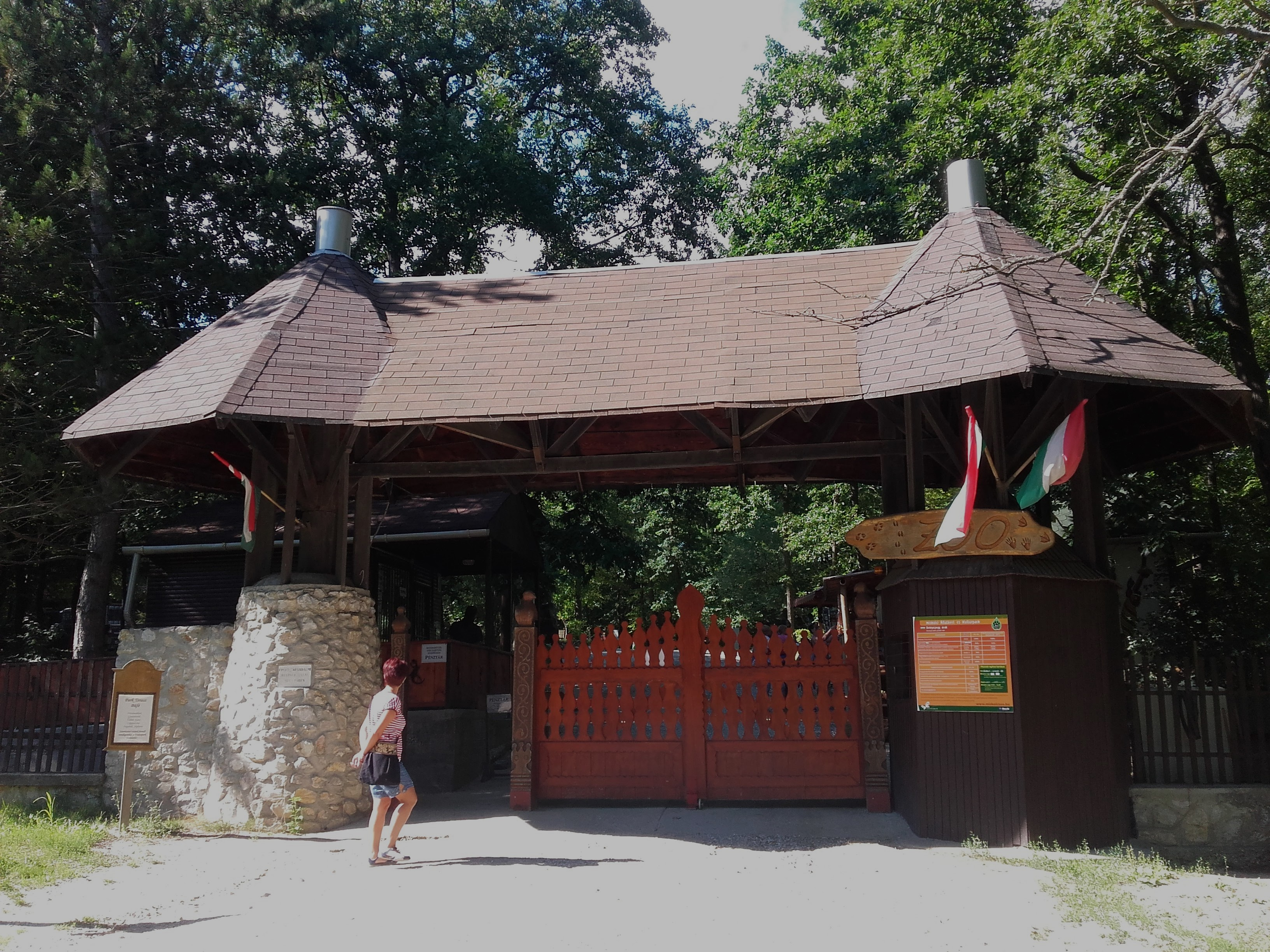
- Interactive map of Miskolc Zoo
- Location: Miskolc, Hungary
- Land area: 212,000 square miles (550,000 km^{2})
- No. of animals: 700
- No. of species: 130
- Website: miskolczoo.hu

Miskolc Zoo is a zoo in Miskolc, Hungary. Although its official name is Miskolc Városi Vadaspark – "Wildlife Park of Miskolc" – it is actually a zoo because the animals are kept in cages.

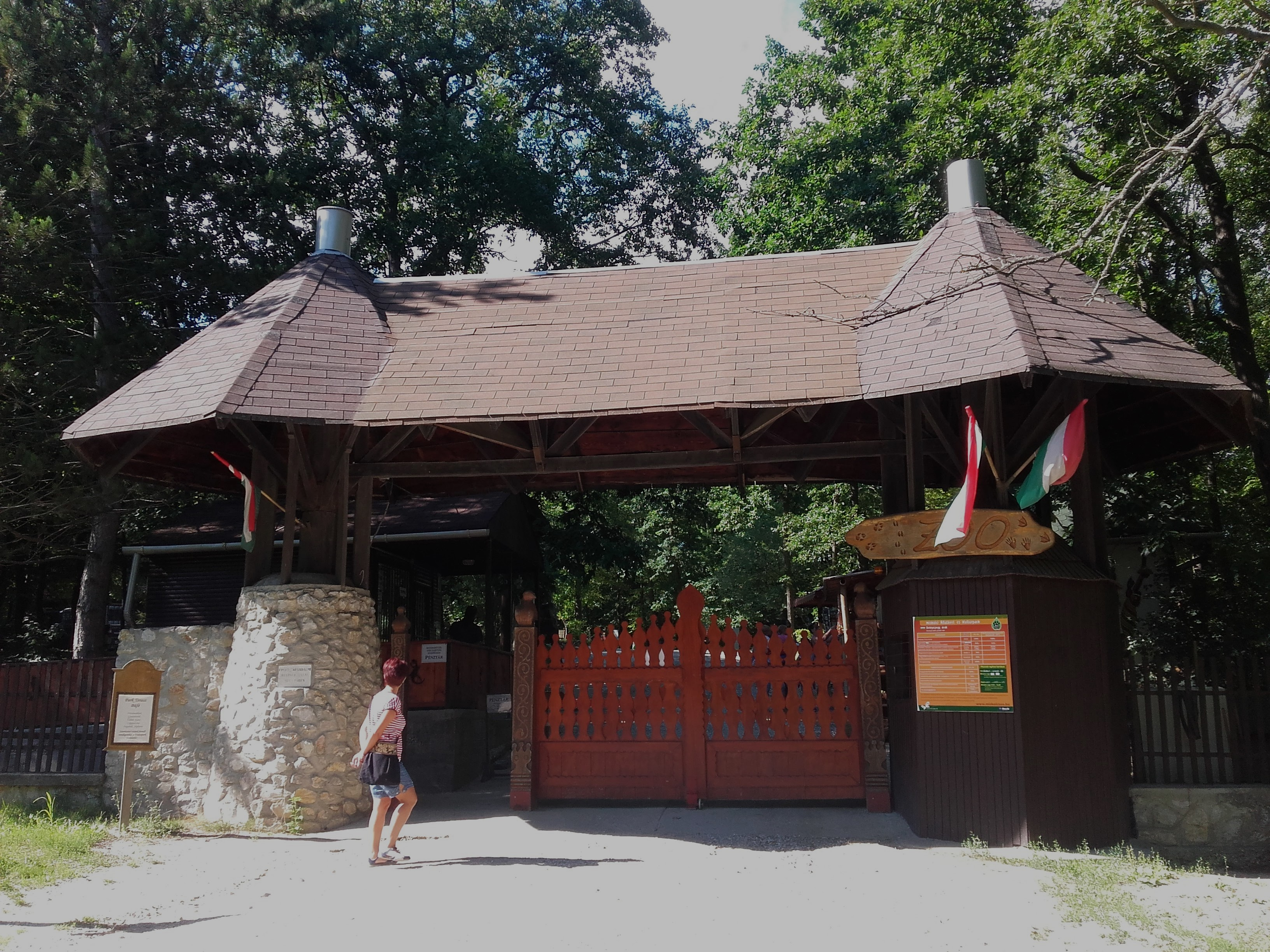
Miskolc Zoo

Its first predecessor was the royal game park founded by King Louis I in 1355. Today's zoo was opened on 20 August 1983.

It can be found in the Csanyik, a large park in the outskirts of Miskolc, right next to the Bükk National Park, in an area of 212,000 square metres.

The zoo was built within 100 days by voluntary service. Originally, it was a wildlife park showing the wild animals of the surrounding Bükk mountains. Today not only local wild animals can be seen here, but also exotic animals like camels, monkeys, parrots, tigers, and leopards. The zoo has about 700 animals of 130 different species. In the 2020s, the zoo underwent massive renovation, which was founded by European Union under the European Regional Development Fund and Hungarian state funds worth HUF 413.7 million. A new 200 m Sahel complex was introduced, and multiple new buildings were opened.

One of the unique features is the statue park where lifelike statues of extinct animals are exhibited. Its main purpose is to call people's attention to the importance of preserving wildlife. Statues of famous naturalists can also be seen here, among them the first Gerald Durrell statue of the world.
