= Miskolc-Avas TV Tower =

Observation and television tower in Miskolc, Hungary

Coordinates: 48°05′53″N 20°46′11″E

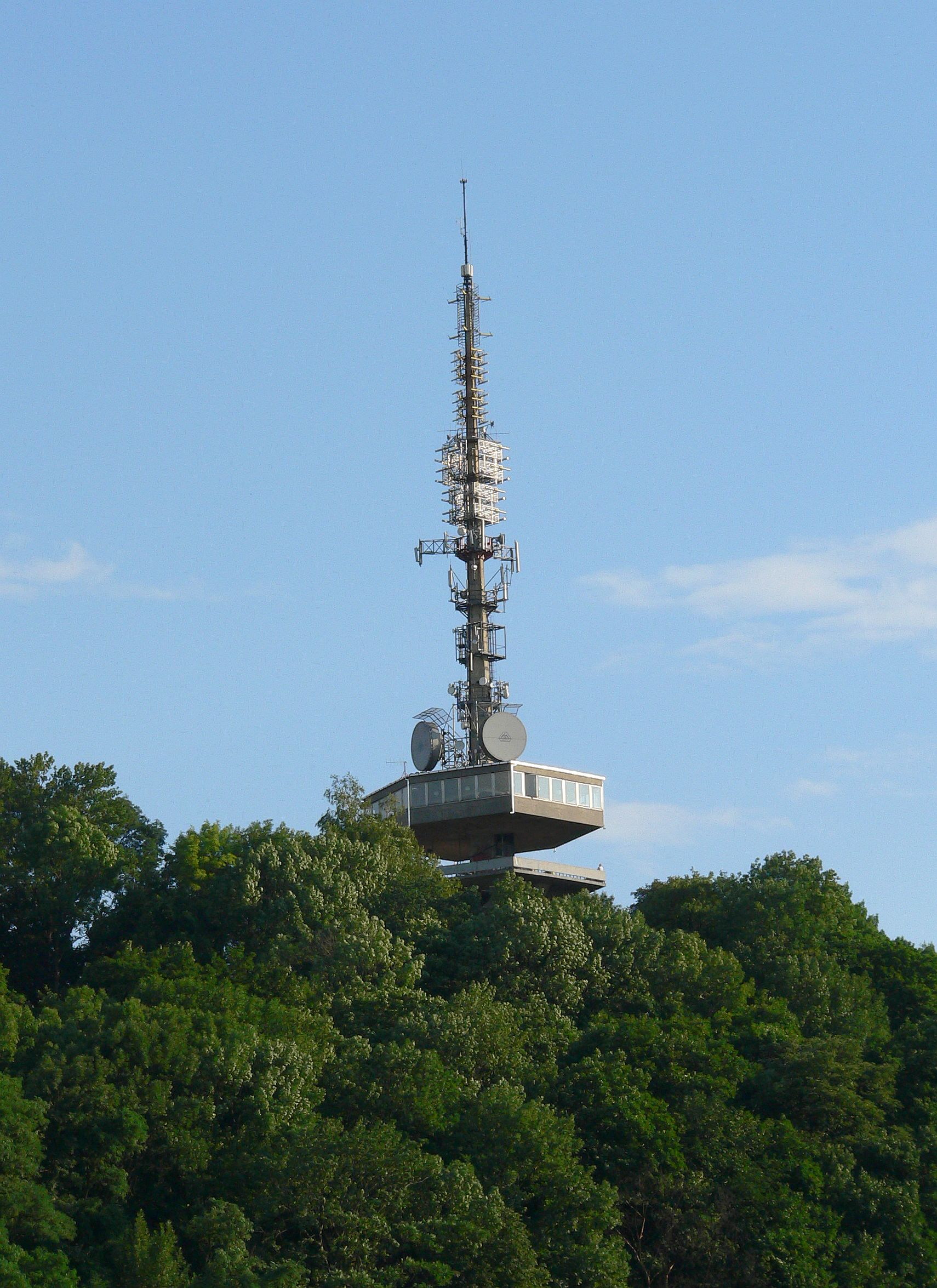
The tower

Miskolc-Avas TV Tower (in colloquial speech Avasi kilátó, Avas Lookout Tower) is a 72-metre (236 ft) tall television tower with an observation deck on the Avas hill in Miskolc, Hungary. The Avas TV Tower was designed by Miklós Hófer and György Vörös, and was built in 1966 in place of a wooden lookout tower. It is commonly regarded as the symbol of the city, even though in the 1990s the bell tower of the Avas church was declared the city's symbol in its place.

The first lookout tower which stood in this place was built in 1906. It was a temporary structure built within two weeks, as a sign of respect for Ferenc II Rákóczi, whose ashes were transported to Kassa (modern-day Kosice) through Miskolc. The tower was decorated with the flag and other insignia of Rákóczi.

The first permanent tower was erected in 1934 and was designed by Bálint Szeghalmy (who also designed the city's wooden church). Like the previous one, it was named Rákóczi Tower. It was damaged by fire in 1943 and almost completely destroyed in December 1956 – according to an urban legend it was shot to pieces by a Soviet tank during the suppression of the 1956 Revolution.

== See also ==
- List of towers

== Sources ==
- István Dobrossy: Az Avas kilátóinak története. In: A miskolci Avas (ed. István Dobrossy, Miskolc, Herman Ottó Múzeum, 1993.) ISBN 963-7221-58-1
