= Lévay József Református Gimnázium és Diákotthon =

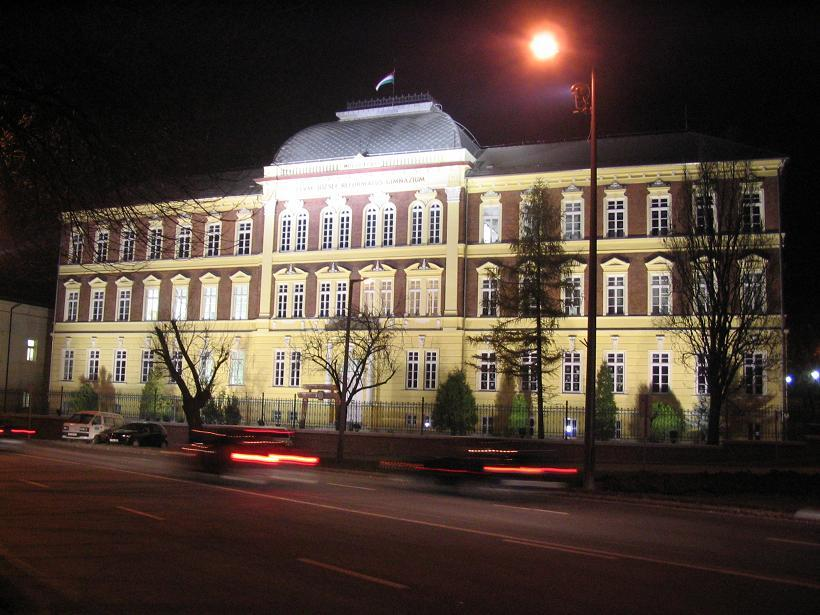
The school at night

Lévay József Református Gimnázium és Diákotthon, located in Miskolc, Hungary, is a high school run by the Tiszáninnen Refromátus Egyházkerület.

== History ==
The magistracy of the city of Miskolc and the reformed church, believers in Calvinism, established the "rektoris scola" and agreed to maintain it. Prior to the Protestant Reformation, the school focused on Latin literature.

The first teachers were hired from Sárospatak, but the school was not part of the Kollegium of Sárospatak. The number of the students increased during the next decades and there was a need for a new building. However, the school was closed after Rákóczi's War for Independence (1703–1711). The Patent of Toleration under Joseph II, Holy Roman Emperor, issued in 1782, insured freedom of religion, and the school was re-established. In 1839 Hungarian was chosen as the tutorial language of the institution. An additional building was completed by 1898, but during the World Wars teaching was conducted in other buildings. In the middle of the 20th century all schools were nationalized, including the Lévay József Grammar School, and the building was used to house a different school. The Lévay József Református Gimnázium és Diákotthon school was restarted in 1993, after a 45-year hiatus.

== Current courses ==
Students have the opportunity to study English, German, Mathematics, Physics, Biology, Chemistry, and History. English and German can be learned in two tutorial languages.
