= Avasi Grammar School =

School in Hungary

Coordinates: 48.086980875861684°N 20.775146976094216°E

Avasi Grammar School is a school in Miskolc in the north east of Hungary. It is mostly a bilingual high school which is attended by about 800 pupils and more than 60 teaching staff. The name comes from the Avas Hill where the school is located. Avasi Grammar School was established in 1987.

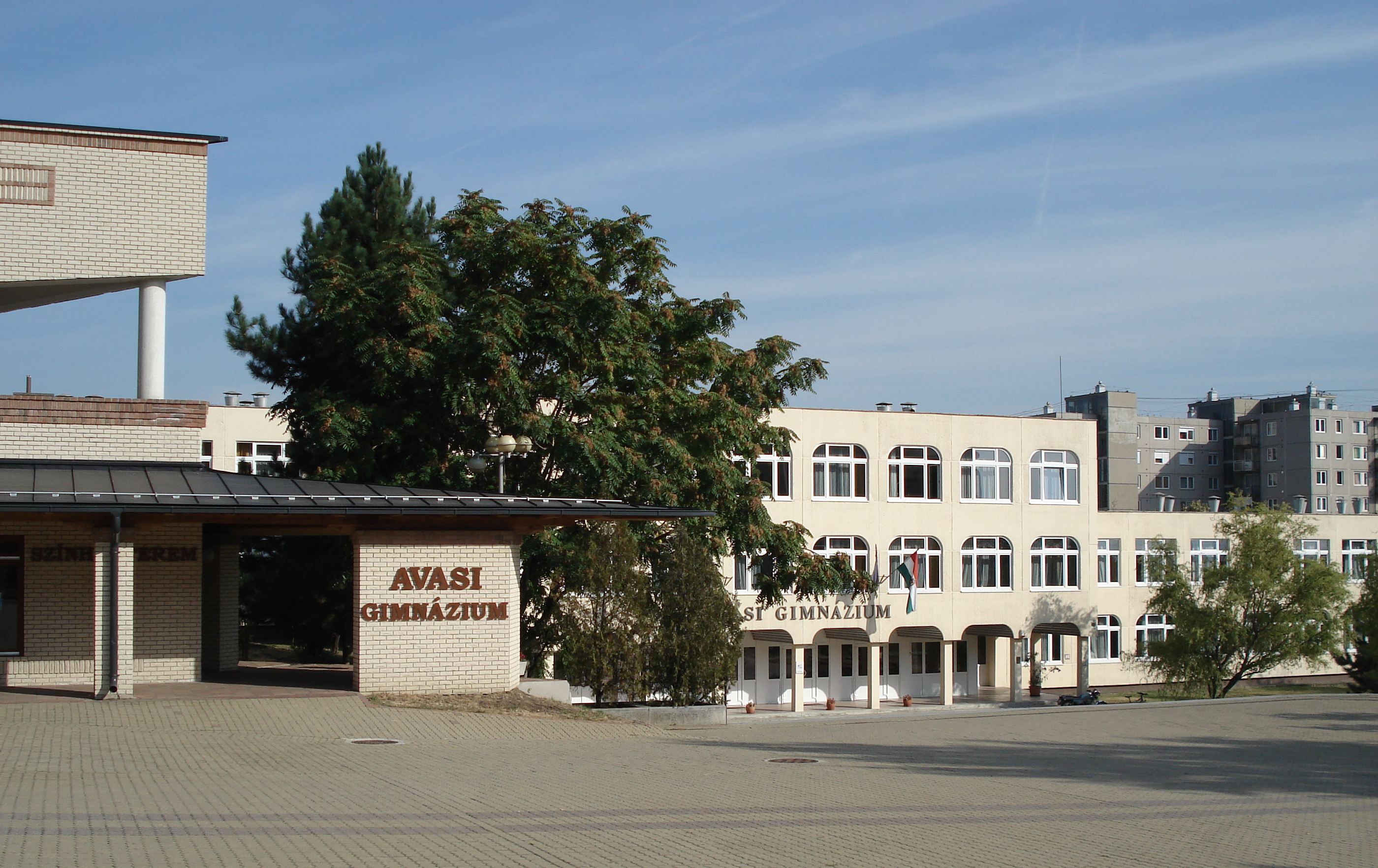
