= Diósgyőr =

Historical town of Hungary

Coordinates: 48°06′N 20°41′E

Diósgyőr Miskolc-Diósgyőr
- Former municipality
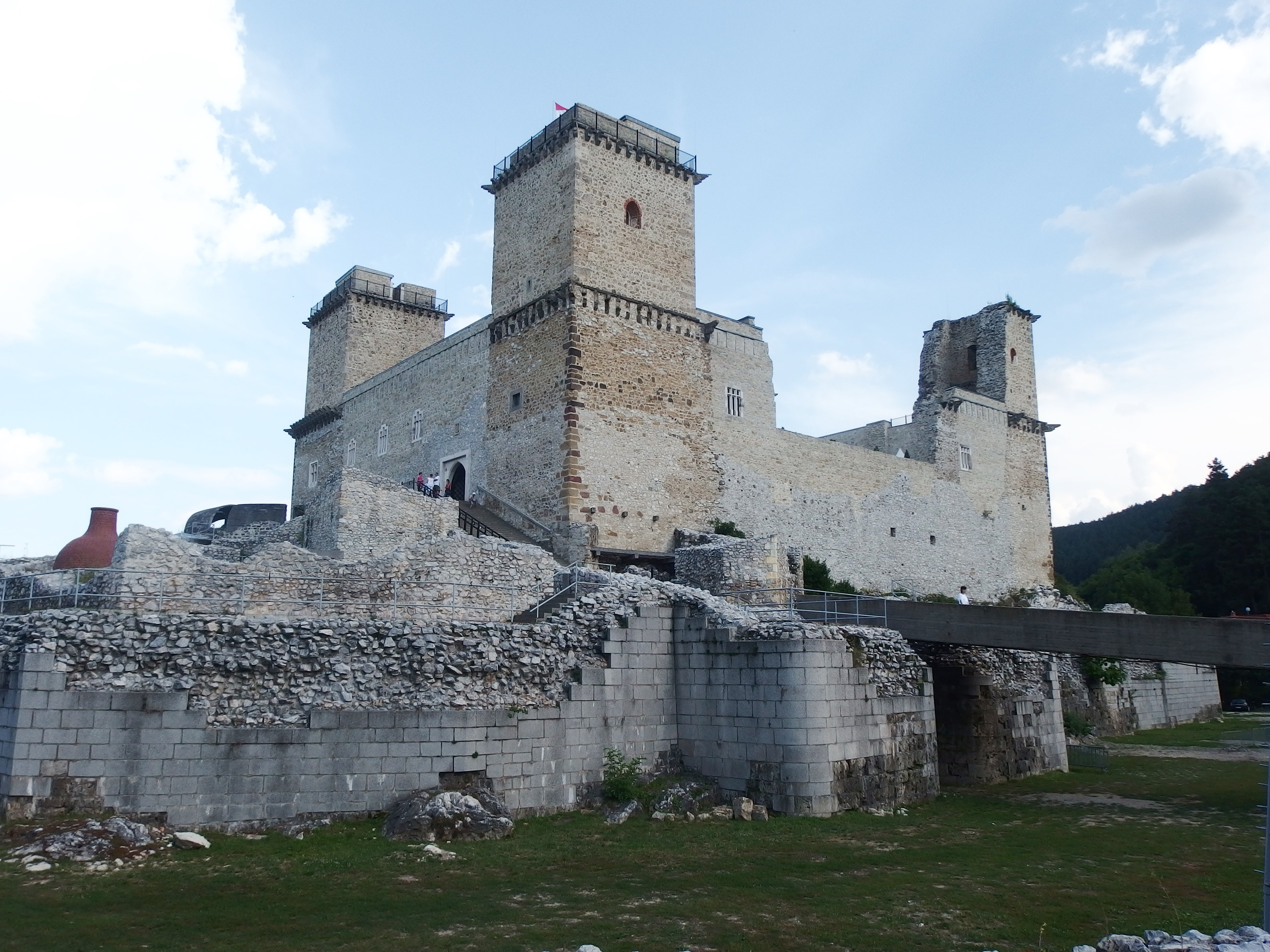
- Castle of Diósgyőr

- Coat of arms

- Location within Hungary
- Country: Hungary
- Regions: Northern Hungary
- County: Borsod-Abaúj-Zemplén County
- District: Miskolc District
- Time zone: UTC+1 (CET)
  - Summer (DST): UTC+2 (CEST)
- Area code: (+36) 46

Diósgyőr (Hungarian: [ˈdioːʒɟøːr]) was a historical town in Borsod-Abaúj-Zemplén County, northern Hungary. It has been part of Miskolc since 1945.

The medieval castle in Diósgyőr was a favourite holiday residence of Hungarian kings and queens; today it is a popular tourist attraction. The city part has a heavy industrial background. The football team of Miskolc is also named after Diósgyőr; their soccer stadium lies within the district.

== Geography ==
It is located on the eastern edge of the Bükk Mountains, in the valley of the Szinva stream.

Diósgyőr borders the following settlements and neighbourhoods: Sajóbábony to the north, downtown of Miskolc to the east, Kisgyőr to the south, Bükkszentlászló to the southwest, Hámor to the west, and Parasznya to the northwest.

== Name ==
Dió means walnut in Hungarian, referring to the abundant walnut trees in the area. Győr is an archaic version of the word gyűrű, meaning ring. It probably refers to the rounded shape of the first castle erected on the hill.

== History ==
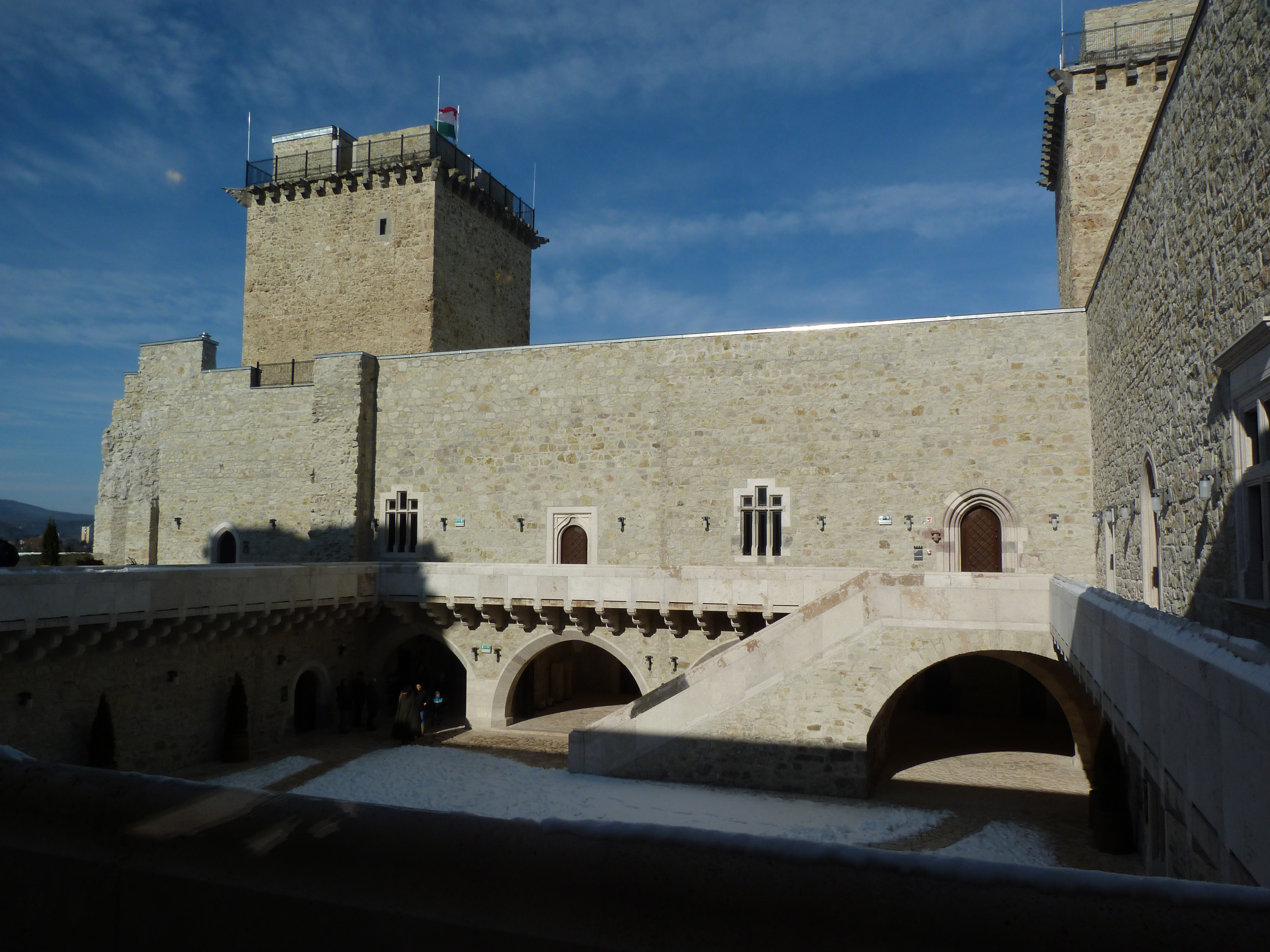
Diósgyőr castle

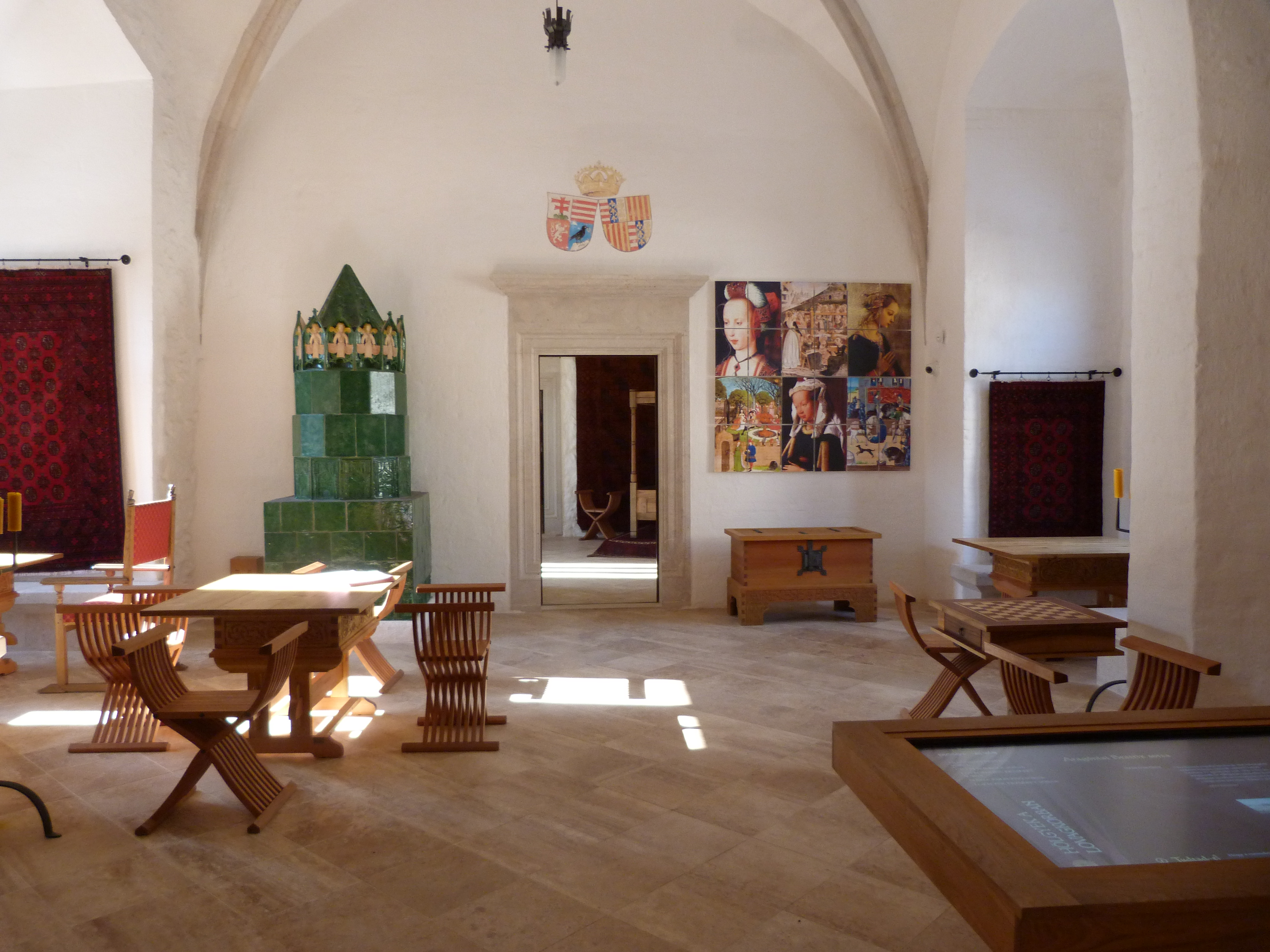
Diósgyőr castle

The area has been inhabited since ancient times, as the remains of a settlement found near the castle testify. The name of the town was first mentioned by the anonymous author of Gesta Hungarorum around 1200, as Geuru, the archaic spelling for Győr: "After our leader Árpád left Szerencs with his army (...) he gave the land between Tapolca and the river Sajó, called Miskolc at the time, and the town named Győr to Böngér, father of Bors."

The first castle was probably built in the 12th century, but destroyed during the Mongol invasion. The castle that stands today was most likely erected in the times of King Béla IV, in the 13th century.

The castle had its prime during the reign of Louis I (Louis the Great). In 1364 the nearby town Miskolc was annexed to the Diósgyőr estate. Diósgyőr lost some of its importance when the political union between Hungary and Poland ended.

After the Battle of Mezőkeresztes in 1596, the Ottomans occupied the area; Diósgyőr remained under Turkish occupation, ruled by the Pasha of Eger until 1687, when this part of the country was freed from Turkish rule. By this time the castle lost all of its military importance.

Even though Miskolc and Diósgyőr were connected by a bus line (from 1903), and by tramway (from 1906), a travel guide dated from 1922 still mentions Diósgyőr as a separate town. On January 1, 1945, the two towns officially joined, and Greater Miskolc came into existence. At first they were connected only by the new factory that was built between them, but the two former towns soon grew together, and today it's hard to pinpoint the boundaries of the historical Miskolc and the historical Diósgyőr.

== Pauline Monastery of Diósgyőr ==
The Pauline monastery was founded by Palatine István at the end of the 13th century, with his support until his death. The monastery also had a scriptorium; one of the codices created here had been copied by a monk named László for the Church on the Avas Hill, now held in the archives of Eger.

In 1526, when Hungary was divided into three parts (the Western territories were occupied by the Habsburgs, Transylvania was an independent state, and the rest was under Turkish occupation), Gáspár Serédy, one of the lords loyal to King Ferdinand, ravaged the monastery, on the grounds that the abbot was supposedly a follower of Ferdinand's rival King John Zápolya. In 1549 Zsigmond Balassa, the new owner of the Diósgyőr estate, destroyed the monastery and occupied its estates. In 1700 the Order of Pauline rebuilt the monastery, but Joseph II dissolved the religious orders in the country and secularised their wealth. From this time the building of the monastery was used by the Forestry Department of Diósgyőr.

In 1973, before the building of a large housing estate began, archaeological excavations were carried out in the area. According to their findings, it seemed the monastery was a rectangular building around a rectangular courtyard, with a cloister. The remains of the place of worship haven't been found, but the archaeologists uncovered a four-room building that had been destroyed by fire. According to medieval sources, Palatine István built the monastery next to his villa, and it is possible that the building the archaeologists uncovered was part of Palatine's private quarters. The recovered artifacts can be seen in the museum in the northeastern tower of the castle. The Gothic statue called "the Diósgyőr Madonna" can also be seen here.

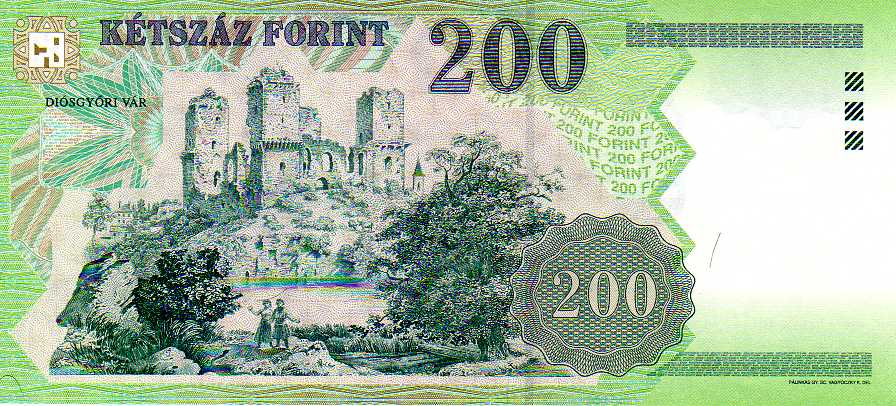
The castle of Diósgyőr is on the reverse side of a 200 Hungarian Forint banknote (in circulation between 1998 and 2009)

== Trivia ==
- The castle of Diósgyőr was on the reverse side of the 200 Hungarian Forint banknote used between 1998 and 2009. The obverse side shows King Charles Robert (an imaginary portrait, as no portraits of him survive).
