= Hámor =

Coordinates: 48°06′N 20°39′E

- Former municipality
- Statue of John of Nepomuk

- Location within Hungary
- Country: Hungary
- Regions: Northern Hungary
- County: Borsod-Abaúj-Zemplén County
- District: Miskolc District

Population (2022)
  - Total: 298
- Time zone: UTC+1 (CET)
  - Summer (DST): UTC+2 (CEST)
- Postal code: 3517
- Area code: (+36) 46

Hámor was a village in Borsod-Abaúj-Zemplén County, northern Hungary. Now it is part of the city of Miskolc.

== Geography ==
It lies among the eastern ranges of the Bükk Mountains, in the valley of the Szinva, on the south side of Road 2505. Hámor consisted of seven different parts: Alsóhámor, Felsőhámor, Lillafüred, Jávorkút, Ómassa, Újmassa, and Bükkszentlélek.

== History ==
Near Miskolc, Henrik Fazola established iron smelters in the Bükk Mountains during the 18th century. He also had hammer mills built alongside them, and the village’s name preserves the memory of those hammer forges.

The Lillafüred resort was established in Hámor at the end of the 19th century. After metalworking operations were discontinued, Hámor was annexed to Miskolc in 1950.

== Gallery ==
Roman Catholic church

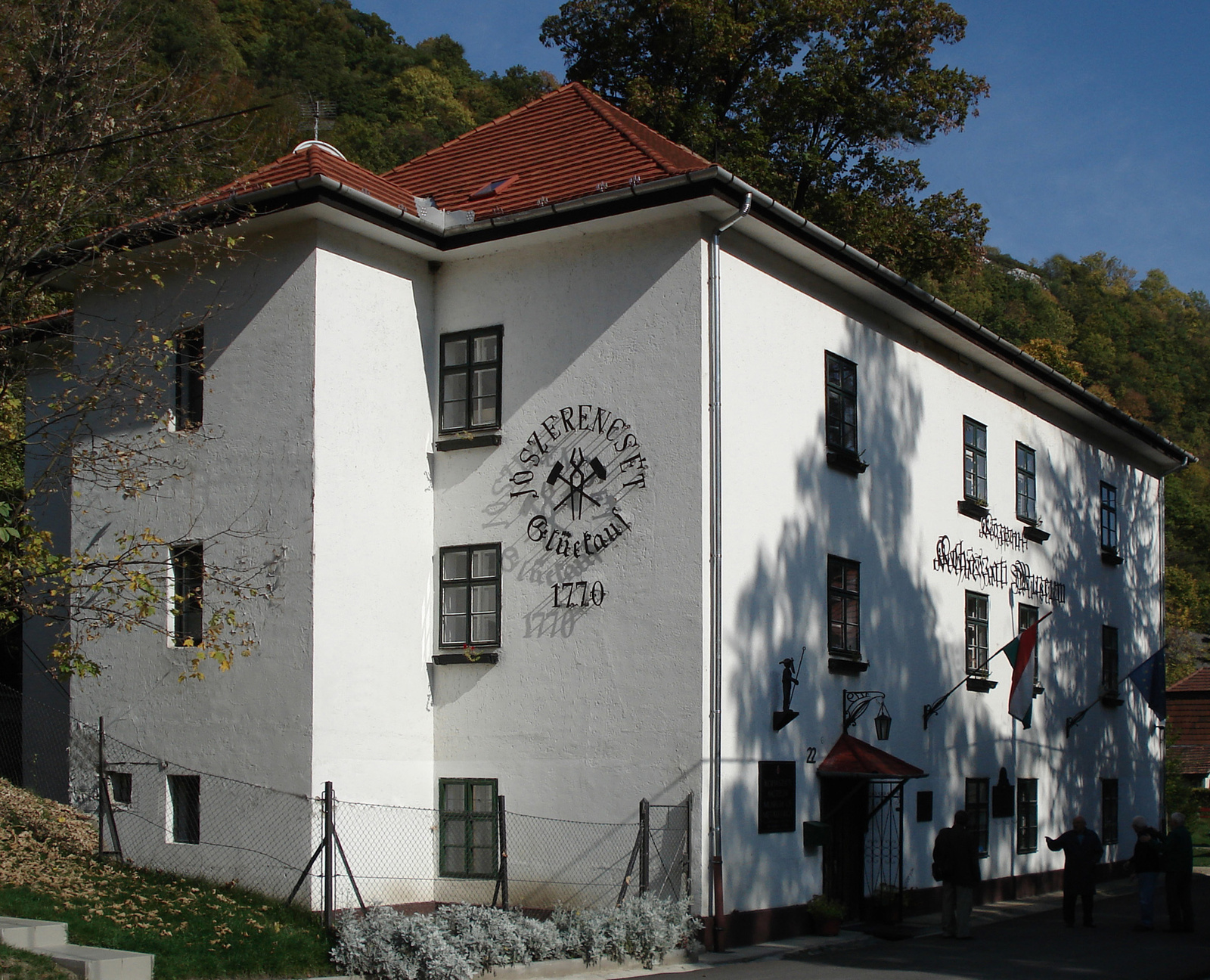
Metallurgy Museum

Ironworks Park

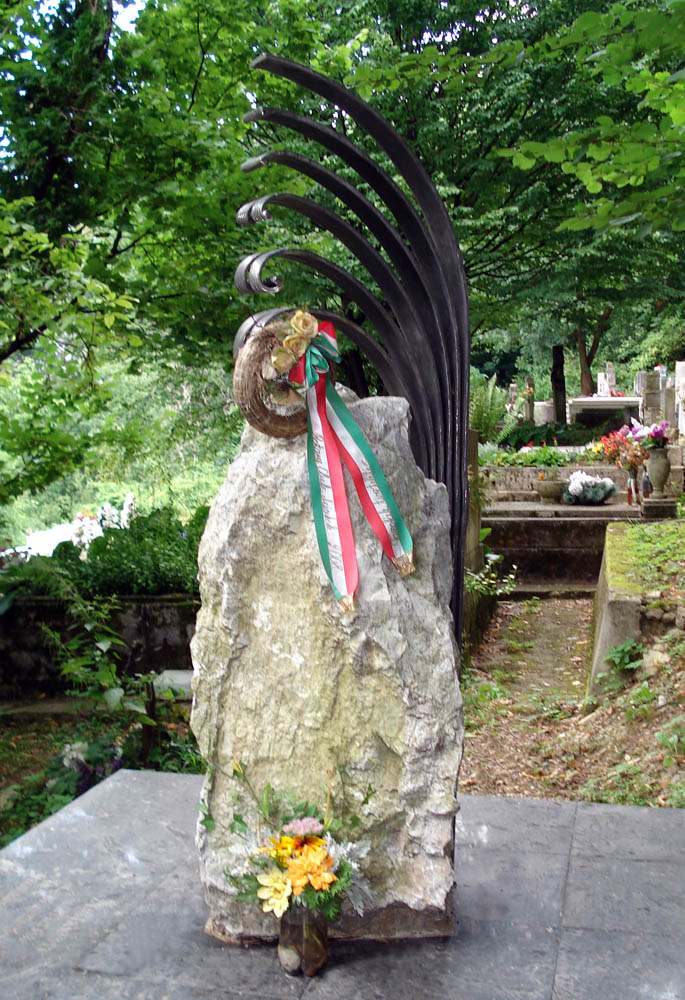
Tomb of Henrik Fazola
