= Sámuel Mészáros =

Hungarian poet (1929–2018)

Sámuel Mészáros (November 13, 1929 – October 28, 2018) was a Hungarian poet, who became the oldest entrant Hungarian, who debut with poems. His first anthology published in 2011, when he was 82 years old.

== Early life ==
Mészáros was born in Diósgyőr, the one of six children born to István Mészáros and Jusztina Hunyor. After finishing school he commenced working in local stores, and after it he started to working for Diósgyőri Gépgyár (DIGÉP) as dispatcher.

He retired in 1989 having worked for the company for 40 years.

== Poetry ==
In 2011, after his wife suddenly died, he began his poetry career. He started to write poems, which he never tried before. His first poems were published in an anthology called David Arts Jubileumi Antológia 2002–2012 the next year. He became a member of a literary group. In October 2012 he was recognised by the Hungarian Records as the oldest living Hungarian people, who debut as a poet at the age of 82.

As of 2013 he was writing poems for a second anthology.

== Personal life ==
Mészáros was married to Klára Nagy from 1958 until her death on 2011. They had one child. His grandson, Márton Mészáros suggested him to write as a therapy.

He lived alone in Budapest, Hungary, where he moved in 2011 after he became a widower. Earlier he lived in Miskolc for over 50 years and Diósgyőr for nearly 25 years. He died on October 28, 2018, at the age of 89 due to prostate cancer and bone cancer.
