= Vatican Climate Forest =

Forest located in the Bükk National Park, Hungary and owned by Vatican City

The Vatican Climate Forest, to be located in the Bükk National Park, Hungary, was donated to the Vatican City by carbon offsetting company Planktos. The company sized the forest to offset the carbon emissions generated by the Vatican during 2007, committing to plant over 125,000 trees. No trees have been planted under the project and the carbon offsets have not materialized.

== History ==
In 2007, the Vatican announced plans to become the "first carbon neutral sovereign state" with an emphasis on solar power and the Vatican Climate Forest which would offset the Vatican's carbon emissions. The Vatican announced that the roof of the Paul VI Audience Hall would be covered with photovoltaic panels in May 2007. The installation was officially placed into service on November 26, 2008.

The Vatican Climate Forest, sized to offset the Vatican's 2007 carbon emissions, was announced in July 2007. Hungarian start-up Klimafa, a subsidiary of the carbon offsetting company Planktos, offered to plant trees to restore a forest near Tisza River over 15 hectares (37 acres). It promised to plant over 125,000 trees. Dell and European governments also bought Klimafa's carbon offsets. The land has not had trees since the Middle Ages when it was cleared for agriculture. It now belongs to Bükk National Park but, as of 2007, corn continues to be farmed illegally on the land.

The Vatican's acceptance of the offer, at a ceremony on July 5, 2007, was reported as being "purely symbolic", and a way to encourage Catholics to do more to safeguard the planet. An official from the Vatican's Council for Culture stated "one can emit less CO2 by not using heating and not driving a car, or one can do penance by intervening to offset emissions, in this case by planting trees".

In September 2008, Klimafa promised it would plant the trees in December despite its parent company Planktos closing. The company has not planted the trees that would have made up the Vatican Climate Forest. As of 2011, the Vatican is considering legal action against Klimafa. In an interview, Mayor Kiss Lajos of Tiszakeszi stated "we felt honored because the Vatican chose our village" but now "feel sorry".

== See also ==
- Climate action
- Avoiding Dangerous Climate Change
- Carbon footprint
- Carbon neutrality
- Kyoto Protocol
- Index of Vatican City–related articles
