= Bükkszentkereszt =

Bükkszentkereszt Nová Huta
- Seal

- Location of Borsod-Abaúj-Zemplén county in Hungary

- Location of Bükkszentkereszt
- Coordinates: 48.06452°N 20.63340°E
- Country: Hungary
- County: Borsod-Abaúj-Zemplén

Area
  - Total: 26.97 km^{2} (10.41 sq mi)

Population (2004)
  - Total: 1,257
  - Density: 46.6/km^{2} (121/sq mi)
- Time zone: UTC+1 (CET)
  - Summer (DST): UTC+2 (CEST)
- Postal code: 3557
- Area code: 46

Bükkszentkereszt (Slovak: Nová Huta) is a village and mountain resort in Borsod-Abaúj-Zemplén County, Hungary. The village is situated in the Bükk Mountains, at a height of 520 to 620 m above sea level. The municipality is partially inside Bükk National Park. About 20% of the inhabitants are of Slovak ethnicity.

== History ==
Bükkszentkereszt was founded in 1755, to provide shelter for the Slovak workers of the glass manufacture (huta) built here this time. As another huta had already existed in a neighbouring village (present-day Bükkszentlászló), the new village was named Újhuta (new huta). Glass production ceased in 1796. In the 19th century, inhabitants of Újhuta worked in the state-owned forests of Bükk Mountains. In 1910, Újhuta had 1011 inhabitants. Tourism began in the 1930s. In 1940, the name of the village was changed to Bükkszentkereszt (Holy Cross of Bükk).

== Sights ==
- The "Boldogasszony Stone," rocks in the forest near Bükkszentkereszt believed to have healing properties in local folklore
- Roman Catholic church (1800–1801)
- Museum of glass manufacturing
- Artesanal lime-kilns

== Gallery ==
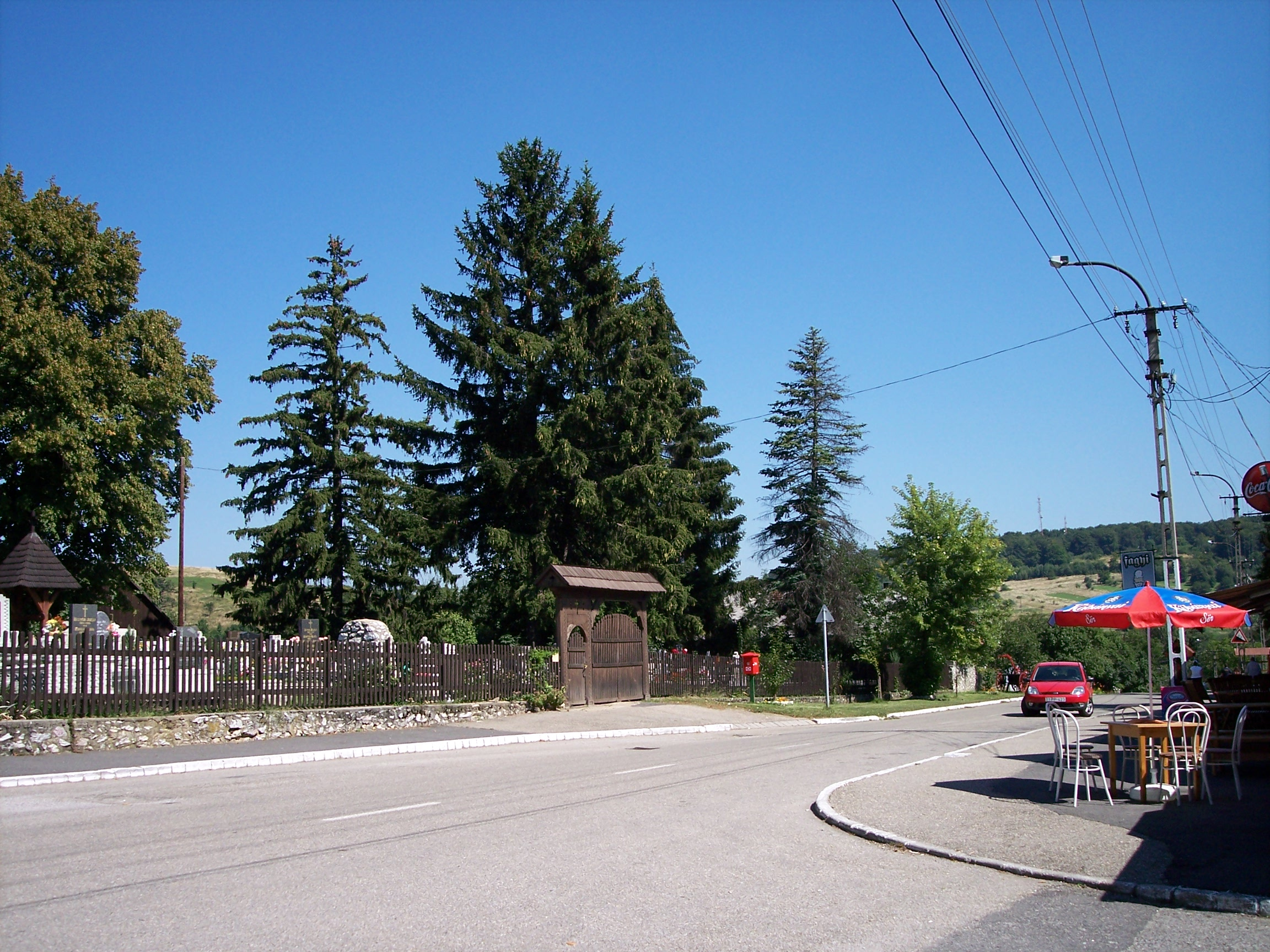

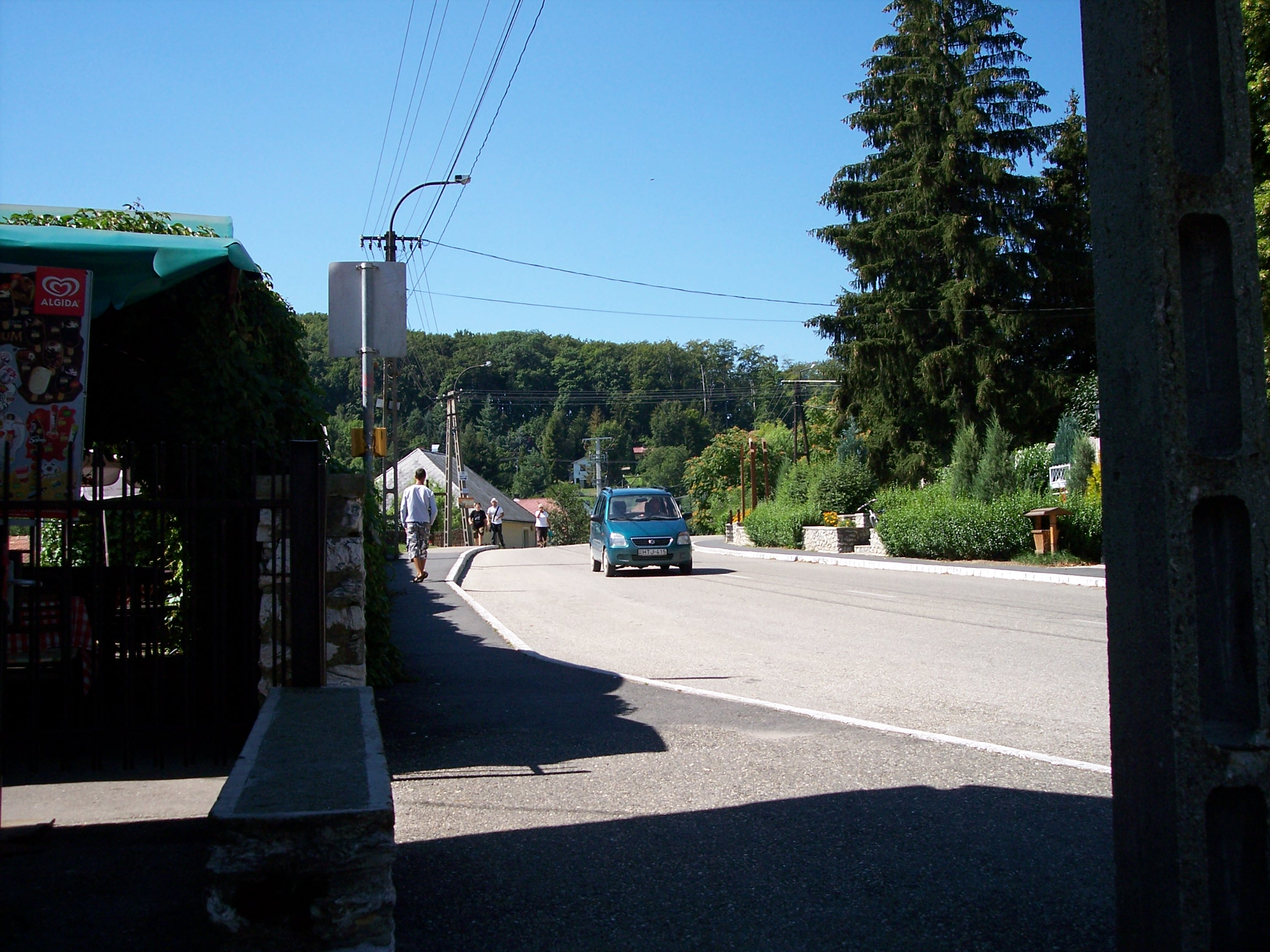

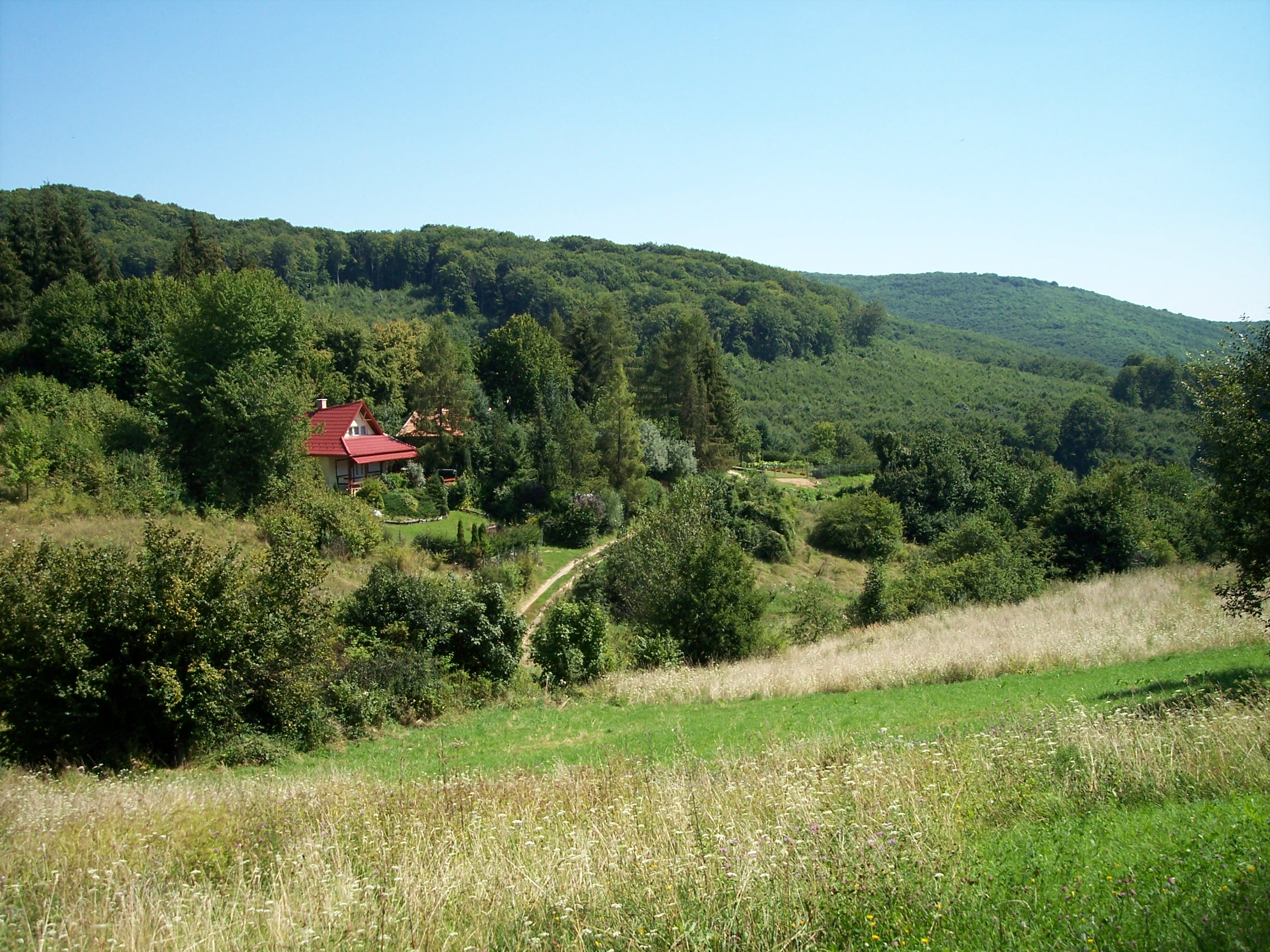

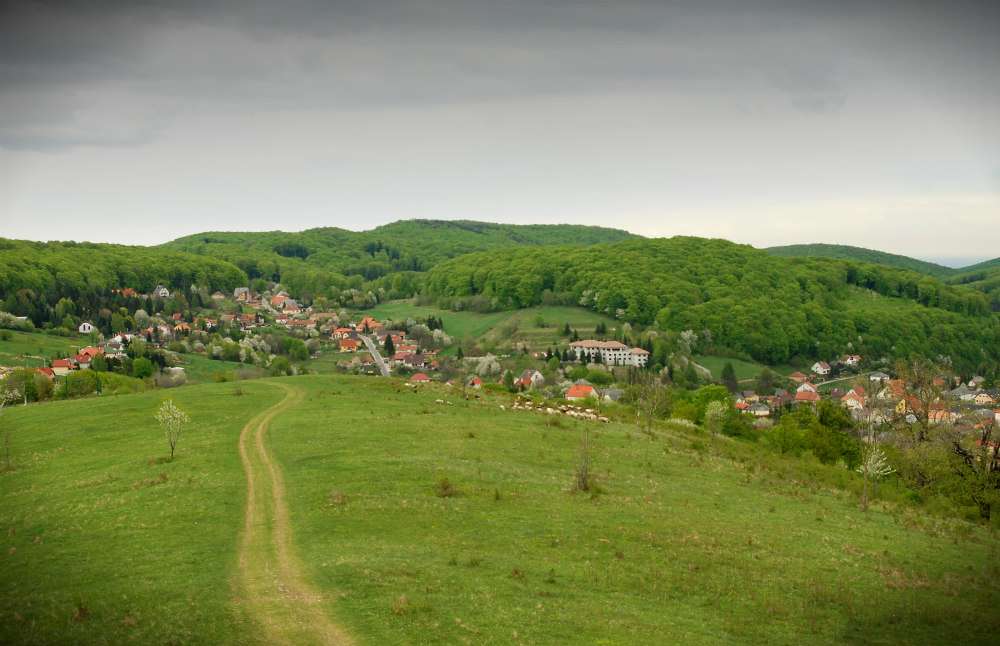
