= Cave Bath =

Thermal bath in Hungary

Coordinates: 48.060826°N 20.745551°E

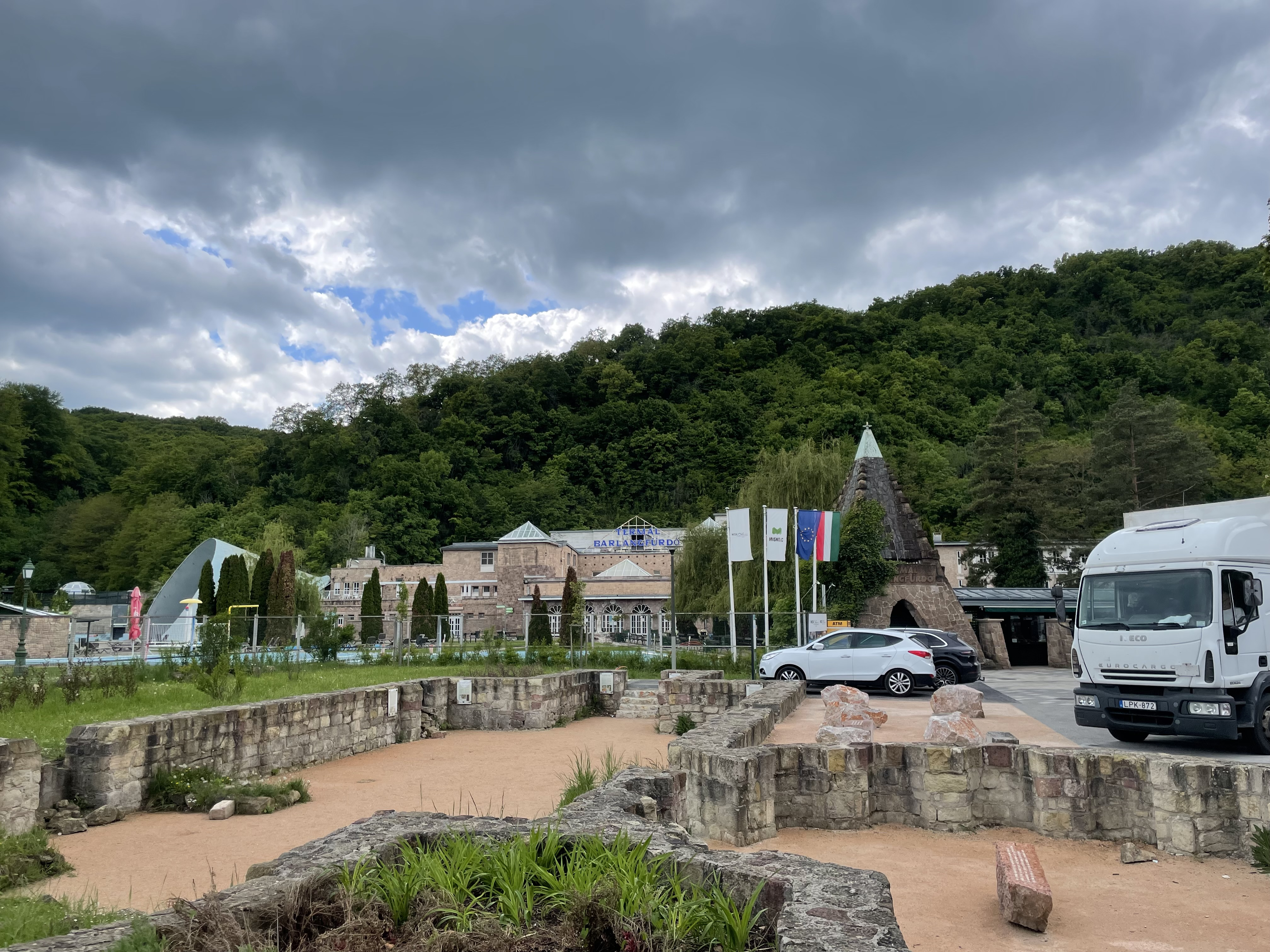
Entrance to Miskolctapolca baths

The Cave Bath (Hungarian: Barlangfürdő [ˈbɒrlɒŋkˌfyrdøː]) is a thermal bath in a natural cave in Miskolctapolca. The thermal water (temperature: 30°C/86°F) is reputed to reduce joint pain, and since it has a lower salt content than most thermal waters (around 1000 mg/liter), people can bathe in it for much longer, practically an unlimited amount of time. The Cave Bath can be visited all year long, except for January.

In September 2024 the entrance building caught fire due to an electric short circuit. The bath is currently closed, but it's scheduled to be reopened by early summer 2025. The city's other main attraction, Diósgyőr Castle is also closed, as it's being renovated; this makes the reopening of the bath an urgent matter as tourism is a major income source.

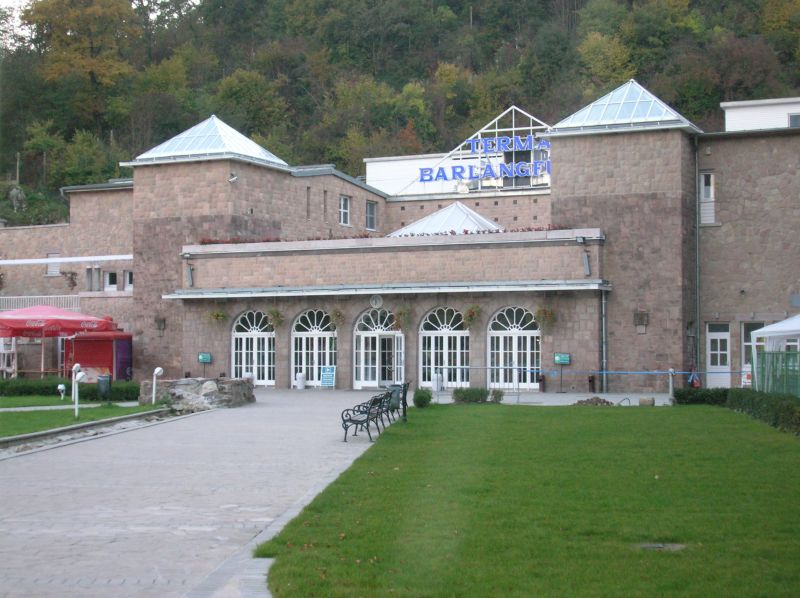
Entrance to the cave bath

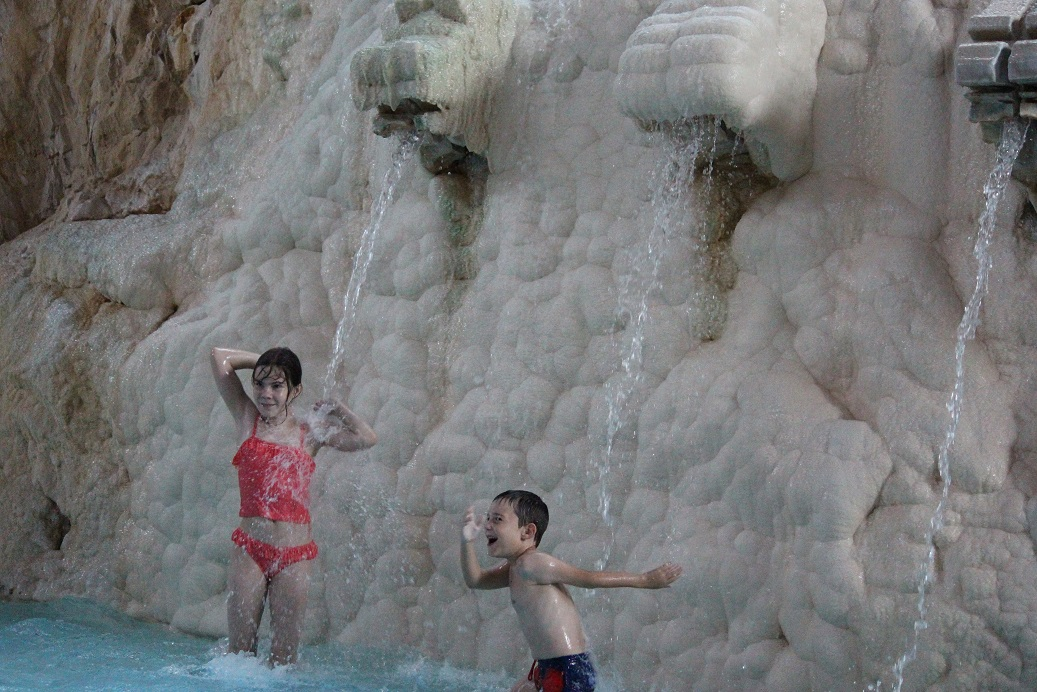
Inside the cave bath

The cave and the thermal spring have been known since ancient times, but Tapolca became a popular bathing place only after the Ottoman occupation of Hungary (16th-17th century). During this time the area belonged to the Greek Orthodox abbey of Görömböly; the development of Tapolca into a bathing place was the idea of the abbot in 1711. He also brought doctors from Kassa, today Košice, Slovakia to examine the beneficial effects of the water. Three pools and an inn were constructed in 1723. The cave itself was not used yet, as the pools were outside. The water was colder than it is now, because the cold water springs of Tapolca (which now play an important role in providing Miskolc with drinking water) were used too. By the mid-18th century, after a short period of popularity, the bath was neglected and by the 19th century the buildings were in ruins.

In 1837, the new abbot of Görömböly had the buildings restored and expanded. He also had the first indoor pool (though still outside the cave) built, but only for wealthy guests.

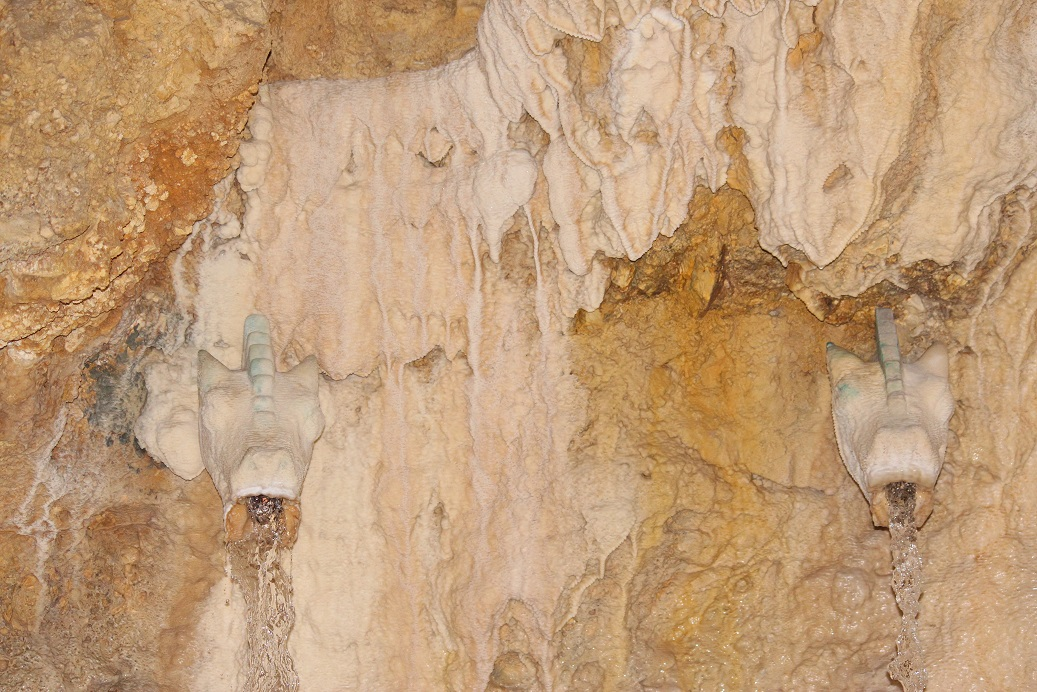
Walls of the cave bath

In the early 20th century, the growing city of Miskolc bought the area from the Greek Orthodox Church not only because of the thermal water but also because of the drinking water source (which now provides half of the city's water supply).

In the following years, new public baths were built. In 1934, Tapolca was officially recognised as a spa town. In 1939, the construction of a new bathing house began. During the construction, several archaeological findings were unearthed, and a new, previously unknown water spring was found with a water temperature of 31.5°C. The thermal bath was opened in 1941 but the Cave Bath itself was opened only on 14 May 1959.

Since then, the bath complex has been expanded several times. The outdoor pool and the characteristic, seashell-shaped roof before it were built in 1969. In the 1980s, new rooms and corridors were built, and warmer pools (34°C and 36°C) were constructed. The newest expansion of the bath complex started in 1998.

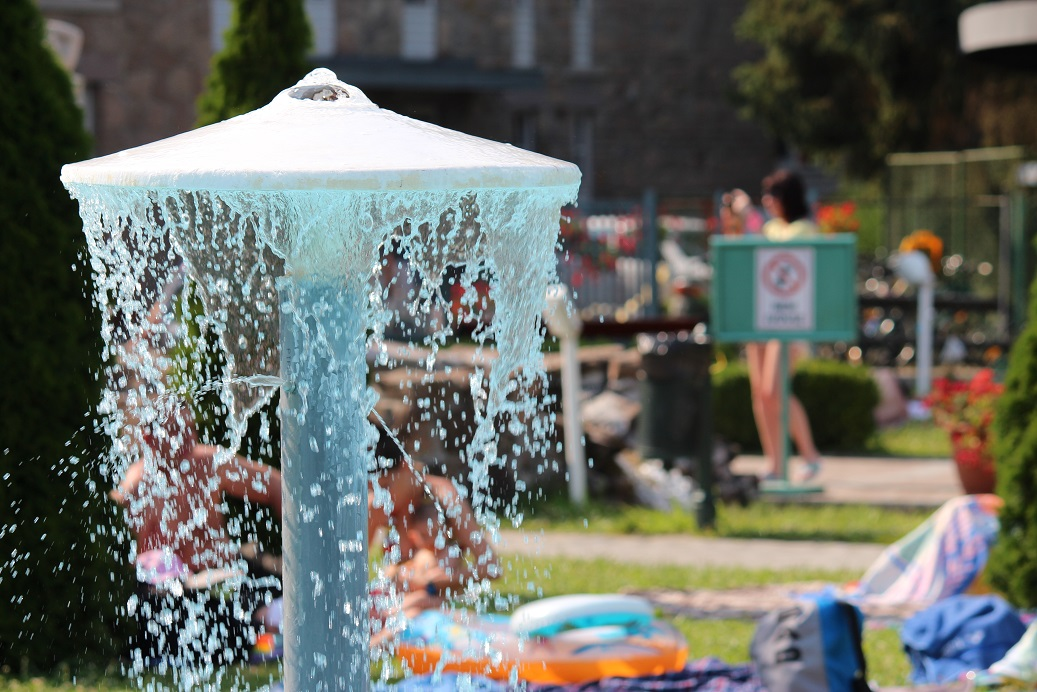
Children's pool

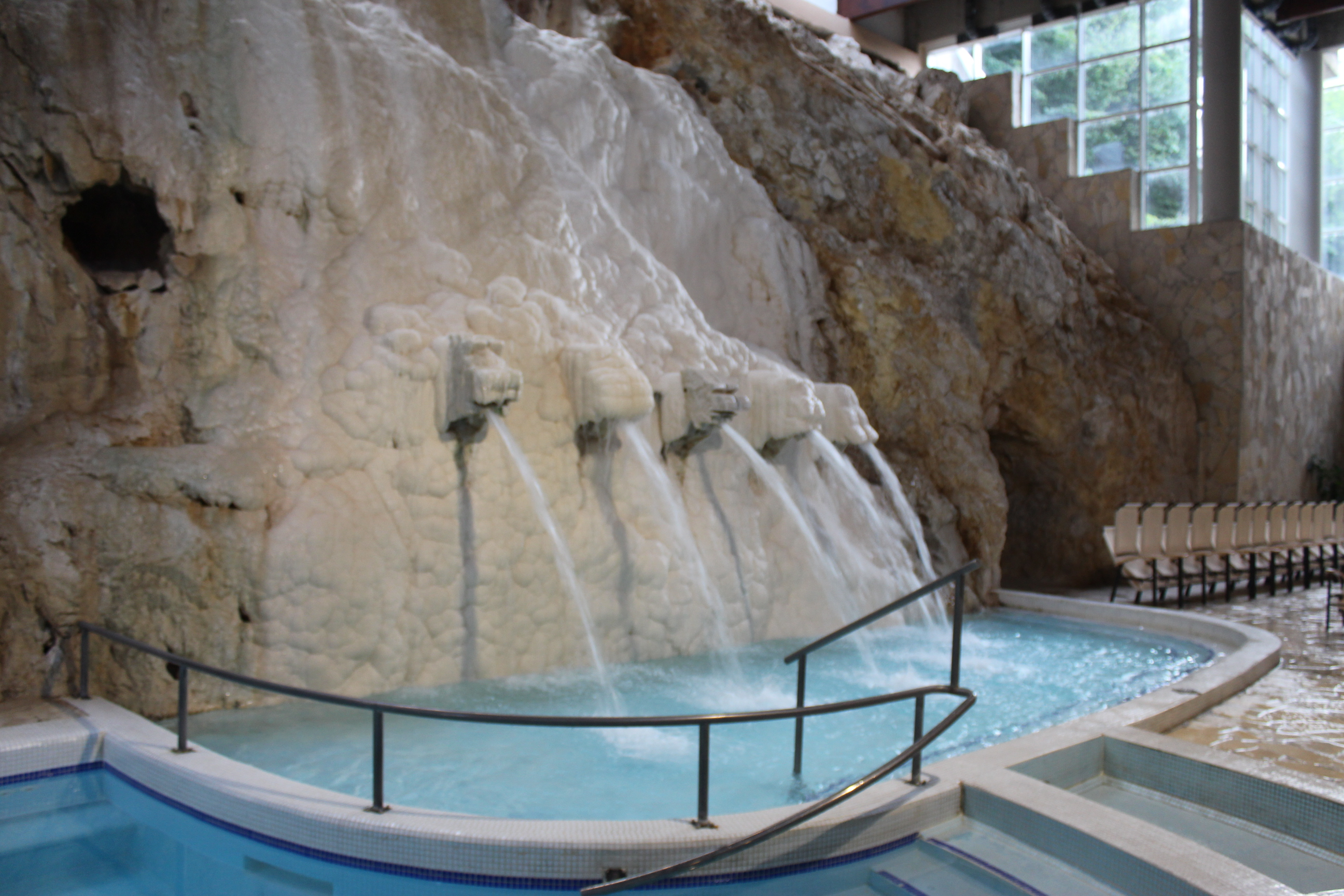
Water fountains

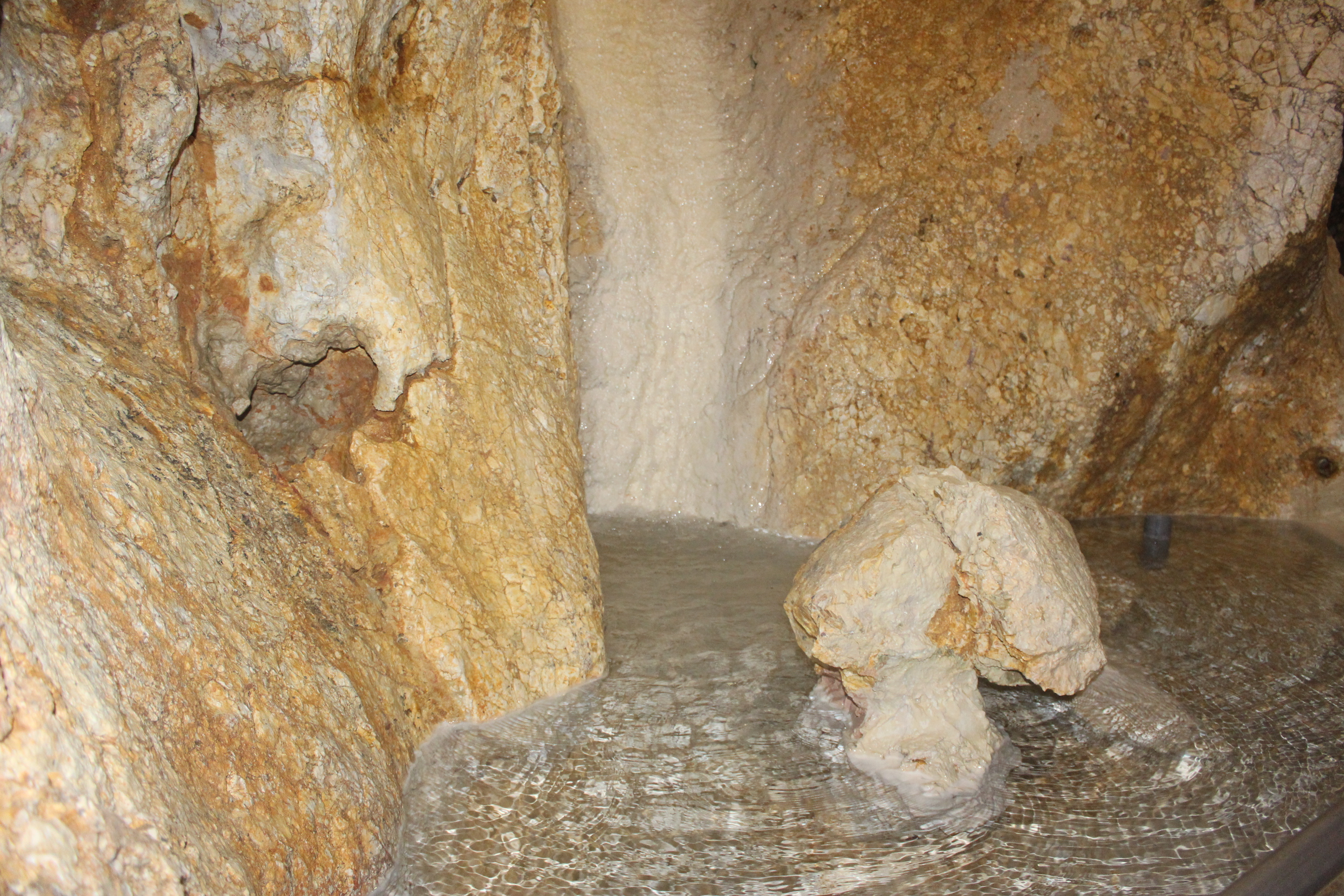
Inside the cave bath

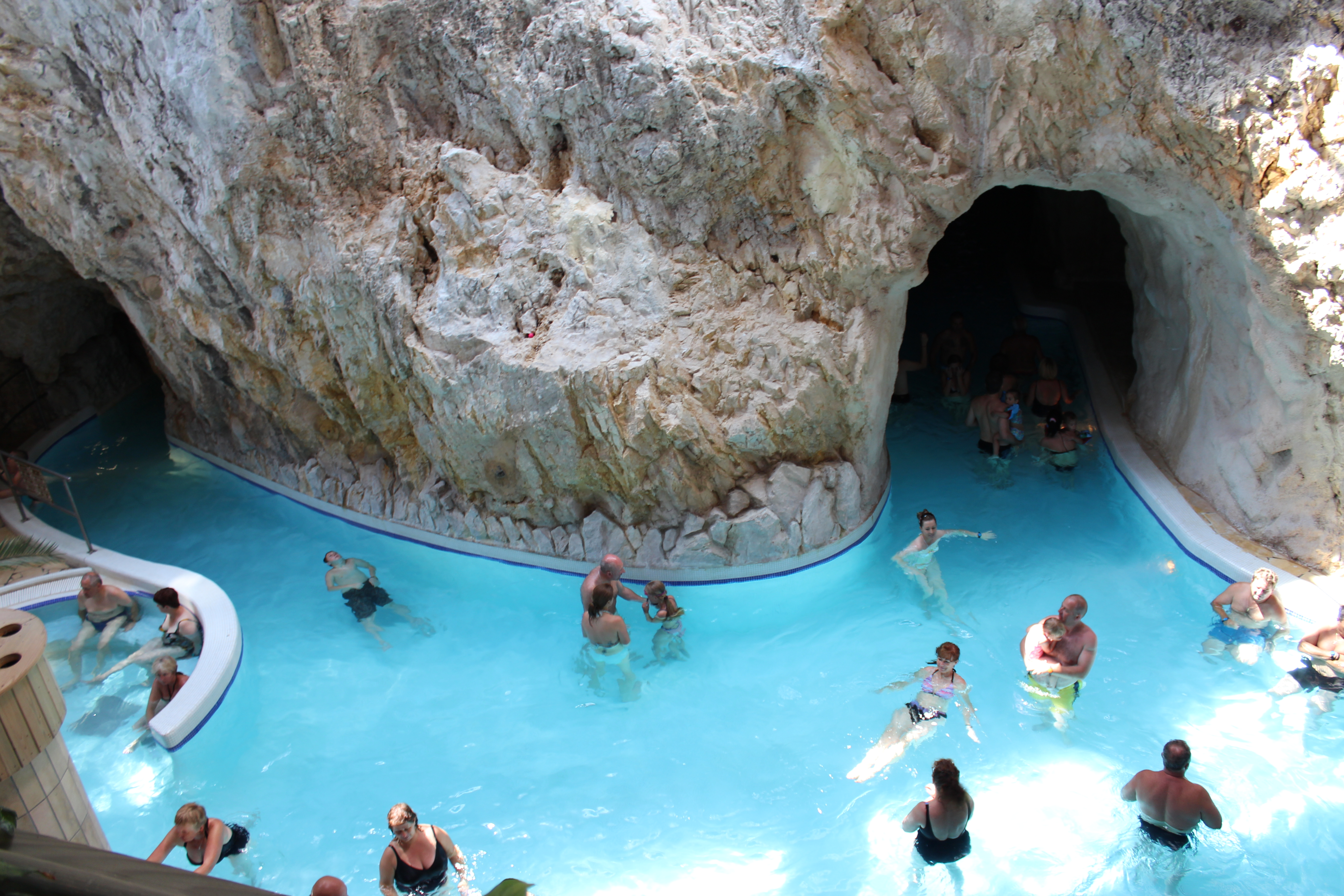
Entrance and exit from the cave baths

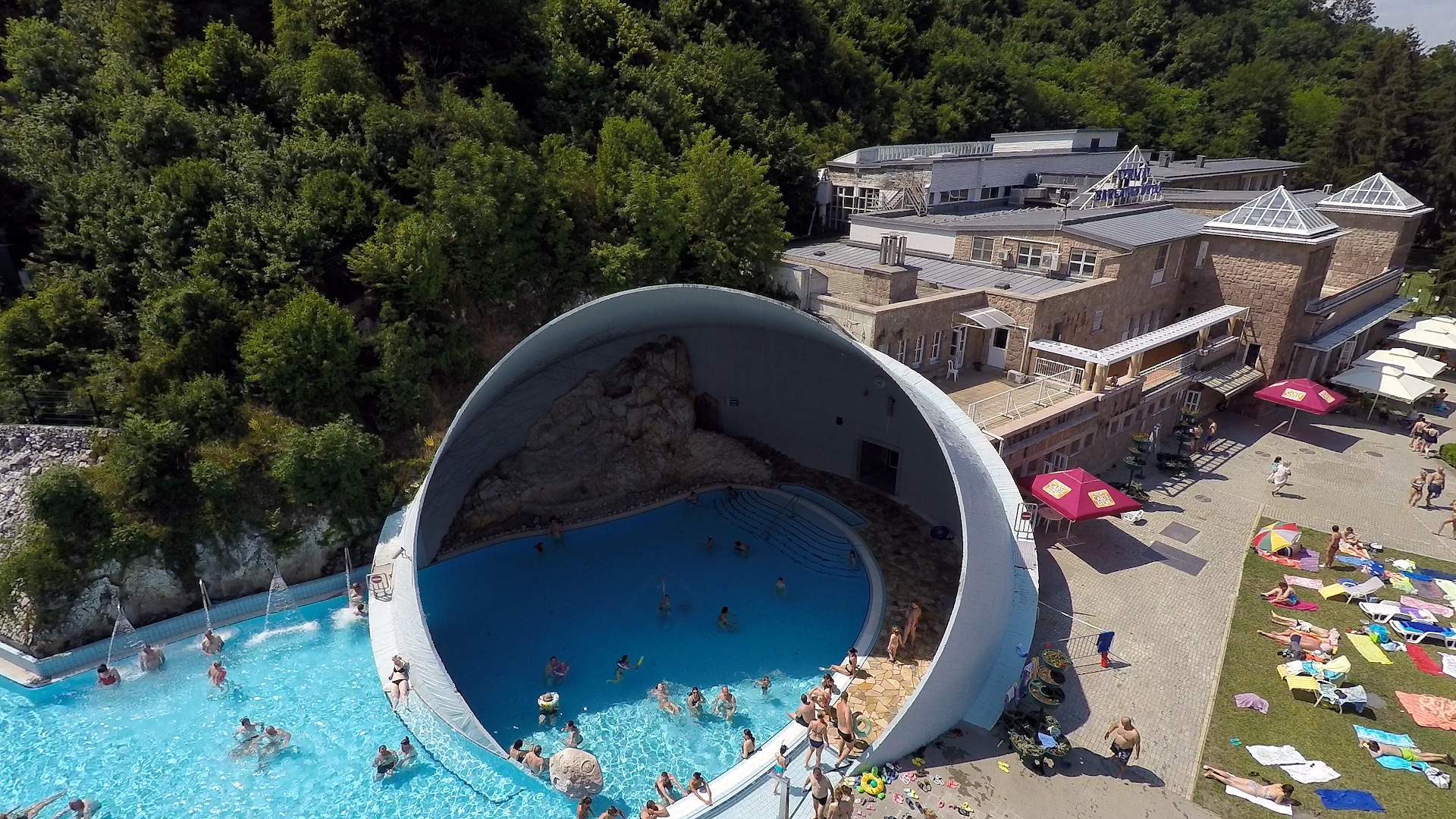
Pool
