= Miskolctapolca =

Suburb of Miskolc, Hungary

Coordinates: 48°3′48″N 20°44′50″E

- Neighbourhood
- Cave Bath

- Location within Hungary
- Country: Hungary
- Regions: Northern Hungary
- County: Borsod-Abaúj-Zemplén County
- District: Miskolc District

Population (2022)
  - Total: 3,096
- Time zone: UTC+1 (CET)
  - Summer (DST): UTC+2 (CEST)
- Postal code: 3519
- Area code: (+36) 46

Miskolctapolca, formerly Görömbölytapolca (planned to be Tapolcafürdő after gaining independence from Miskolc, in colloquial speech known as Tapolca) is a neighbourhood of Miskolc, and is one of the most popular tourist resorts of Hungary.

== Geography ==
Miskolctapolca is located at the eastern foot of the Bükk Mountains, in the valley of the Hejő stream, 5 kilometres from the city centre of Miskolc.

== History ==
The area has been inhabited since ancient times. The archaeological findings can be seen in the Ottó Herman Museum. Before the Hungarians conquered the area, it was inhabited by Slavic tribes. Its name comes from a Slavic word meaning bath and was first mentioned by Anonymus.

Documents dating back to 1219 mention a Benedictine monastery in Tapolca; it stood until the 16th century, but during the Ottoman occupation of Hungary the monastery was attacked several times and the monks left. Tapolca remained without permanent residents until the 19th century, although it was used as a holiday resort already in the early 18th century.

Maria Theresa donated the remaining assets of the Tapolca Abbey to the Greek Catholic Eparchy of Mukachevo, and the settlement became their property.

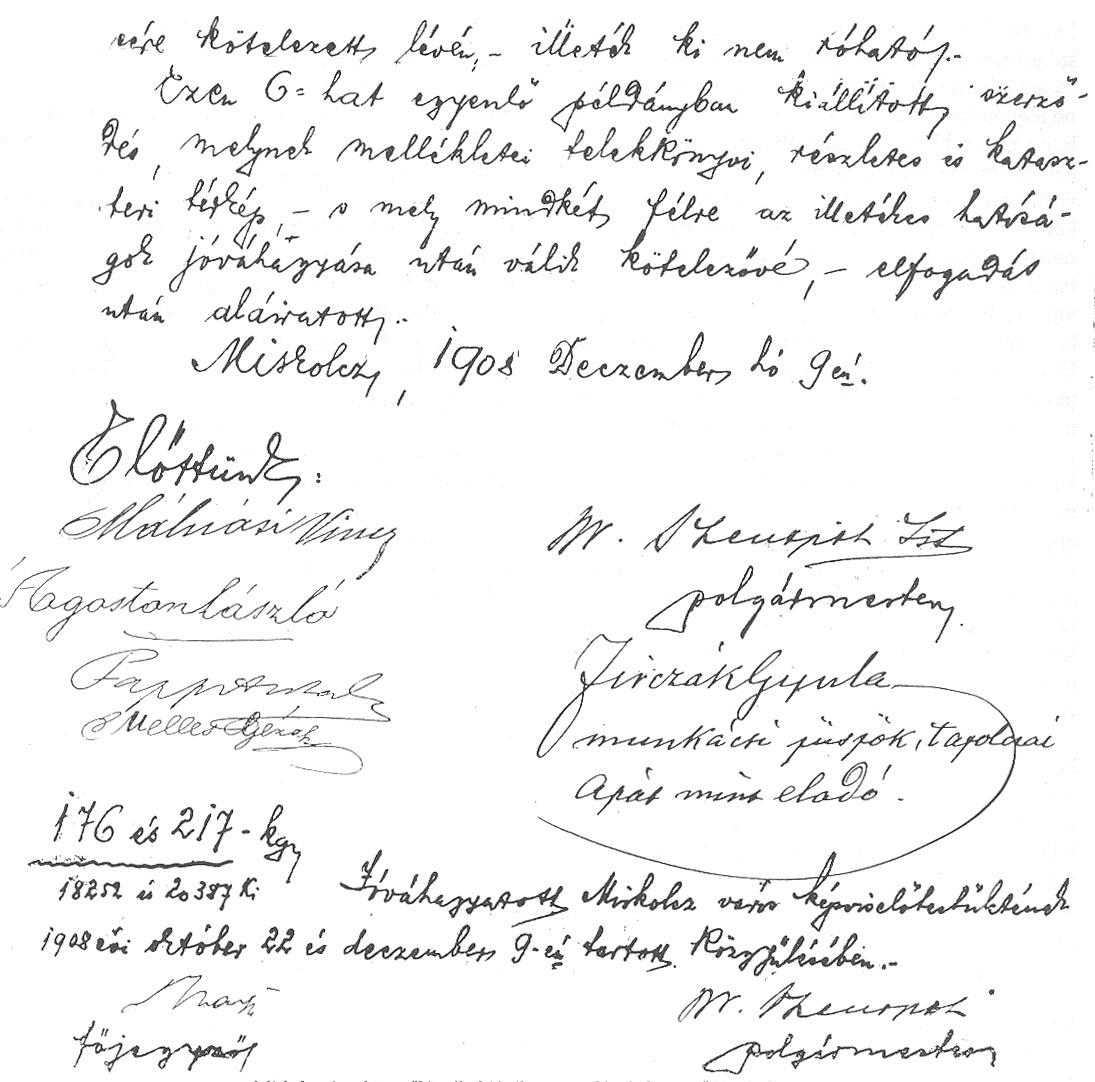
Excerpt from the 1908 sales contract between the City of Miskolc and the Hungarian Greek Catholic Church

In 1908, the Miskolc purchased 48 jugers of property in Tapolca from the Greek Catholic bishop. Its borders were marked with stone pillars, each engraved with the letters "MV" (Miskolc Város). In 1937, the city purchased another 20 jugers of land, the most valuable central portion. Tapolca officially became a resort, and began to prosper, restaurants, hotels were opened. By 1941 the new building of the bath was built. In 1959 the Cave Bath was opened, and in 1969 an open-air pool was built too.

The neighbourhood fully became part of the city only in 1950, when Görömböly was annexed to Miskolc. Since then Görömbölytapolca is called Miskolctapolca.

On 16 January 2005 there was a referendum regarding the independence of Miskolctapolca from Miskolc, but the majority of the votes agreed on staying a part of Miskolc. On 7 December 2008 a new referendum was held, this time 835 persons voted for Tapolca's independence and 591 voted against. Due to procedural errors, the Ministry of Local Government did not submit the request for secession to the President, and the court dismissed the lawsuit, therefore Tapolca remained part of Miskolc.

== Tourist attractions ==
- The 150m long Cave Bath is one of the most beautiful baths of Hungary. It has both indoor and open-air pools, some of them are in a large natural cave. The Cave Bath is open all year.
- In front of the Cave Bath there is a large park with a boat lake.
- There is another bath in Tapolca, with open-air swimming pools.
- The Cave Chapel is a chapel in a small natural cave. Roman Catholic mass is held on every Sunday

== Trivia ==
The town holds the country's record for lowest temperature (−35.0°C on 16 February, 1940)

== Gallery ==
Cave Bath

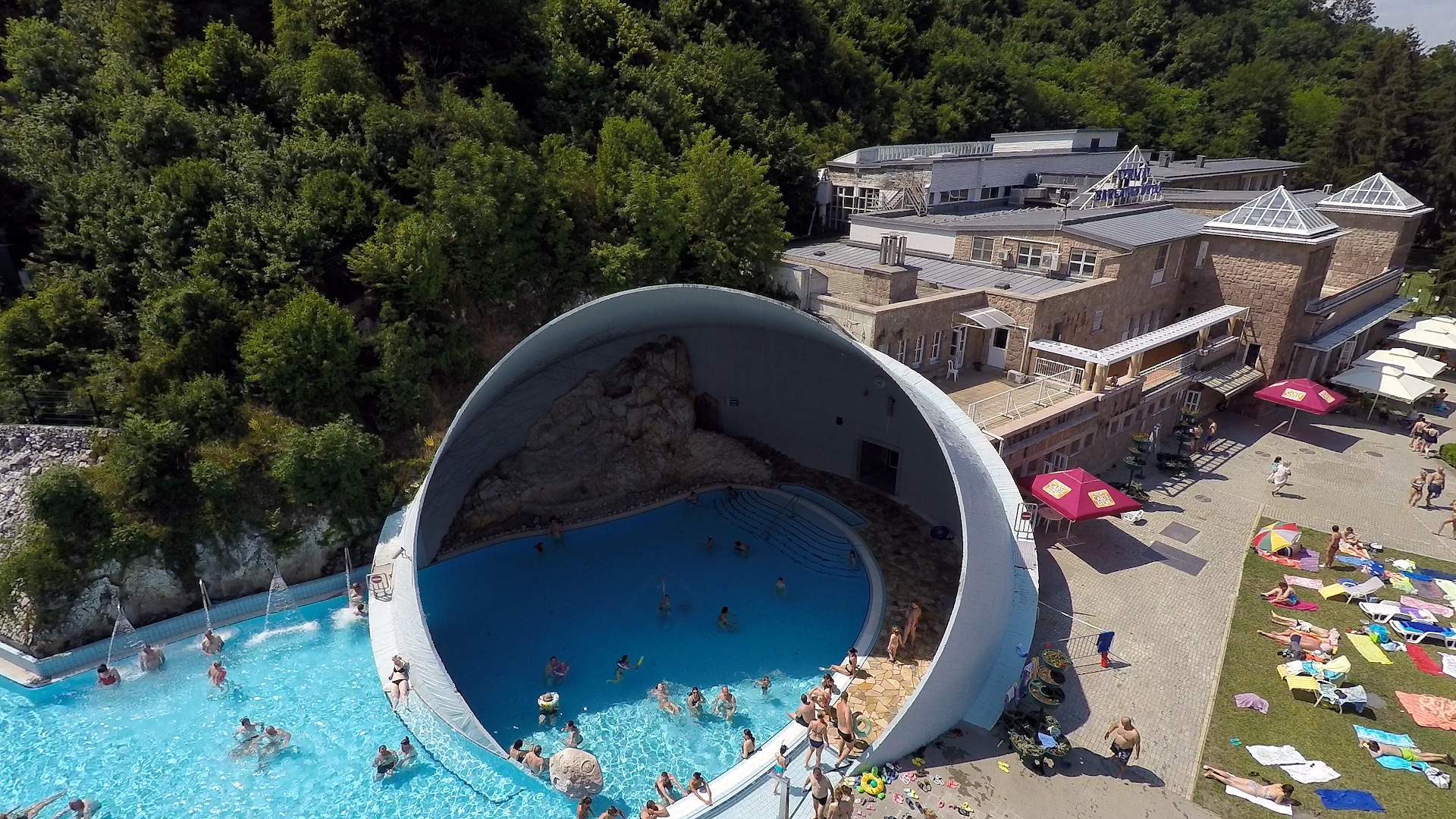
Summer in the Cave Bath

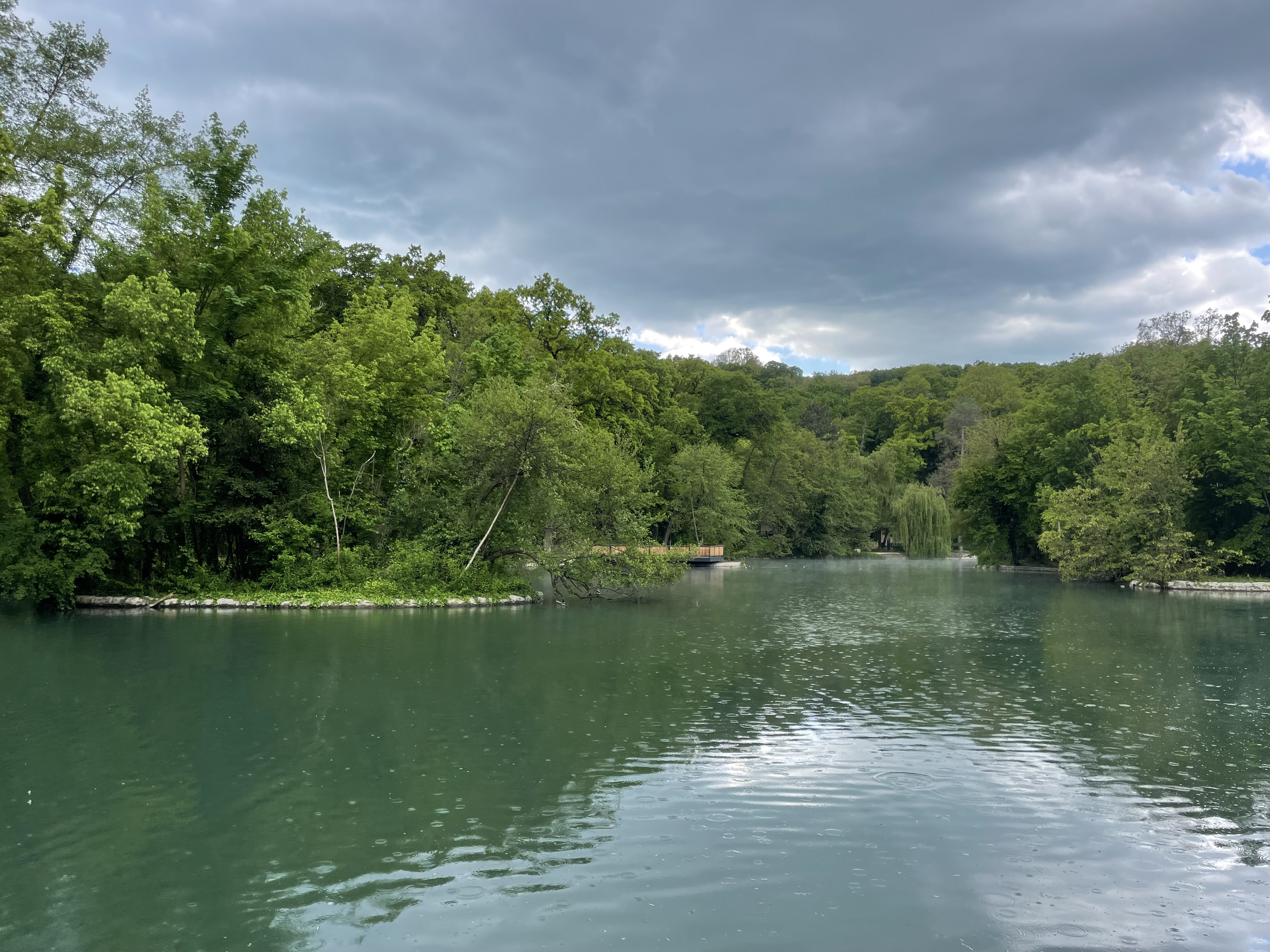
Thermal Lake

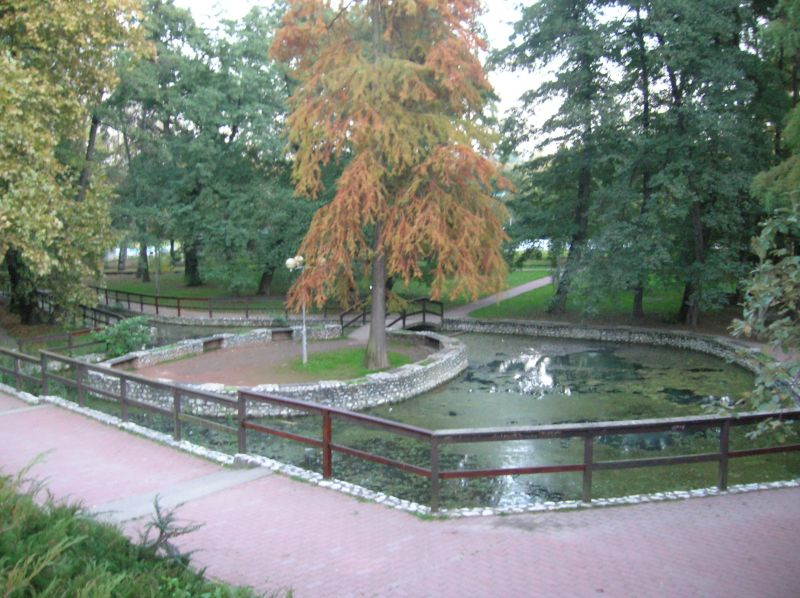
Park

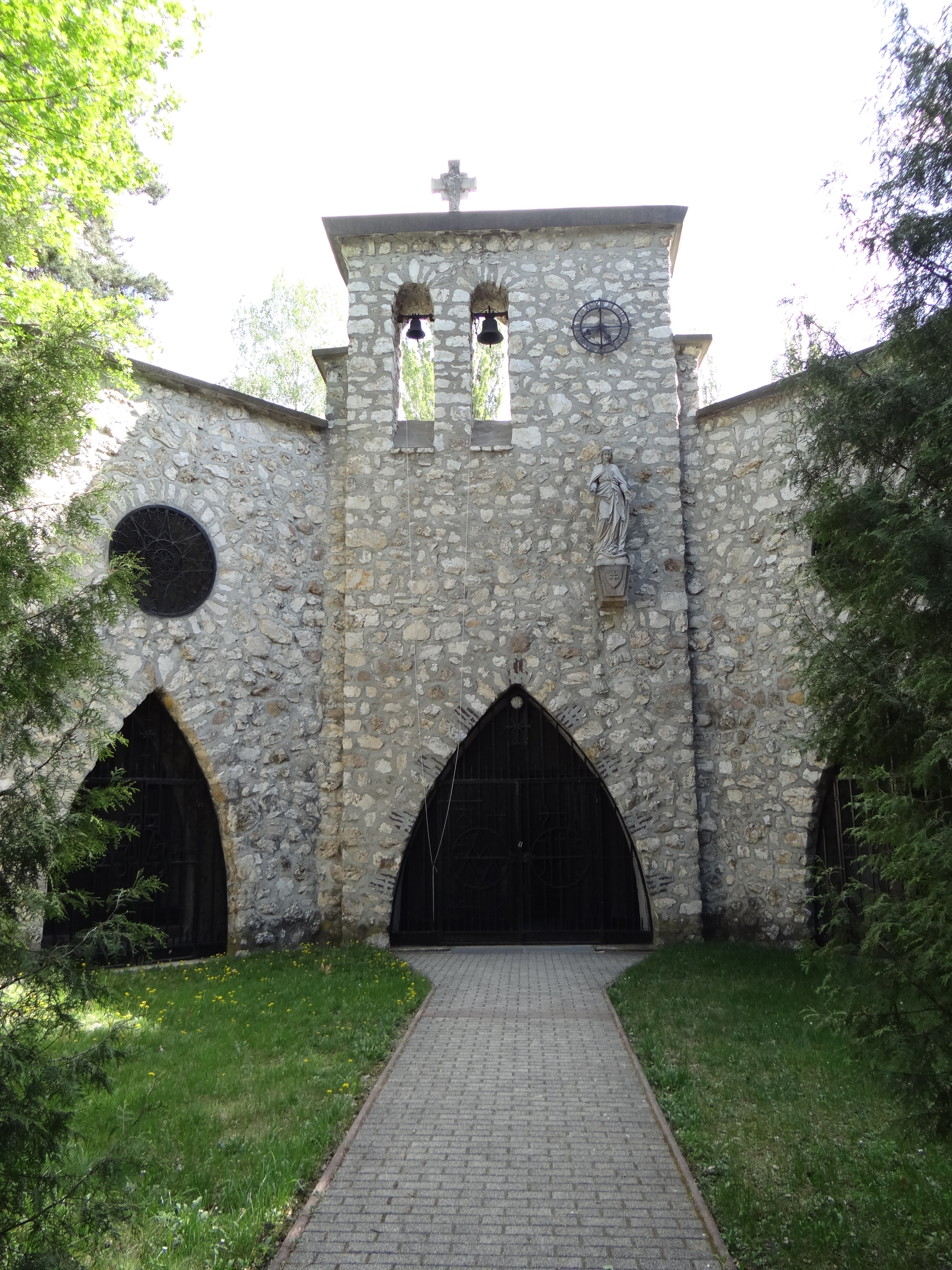
Rock chapel
