= Anna Cave =

Coordinates: 48°6′18″N 20°37′29″E

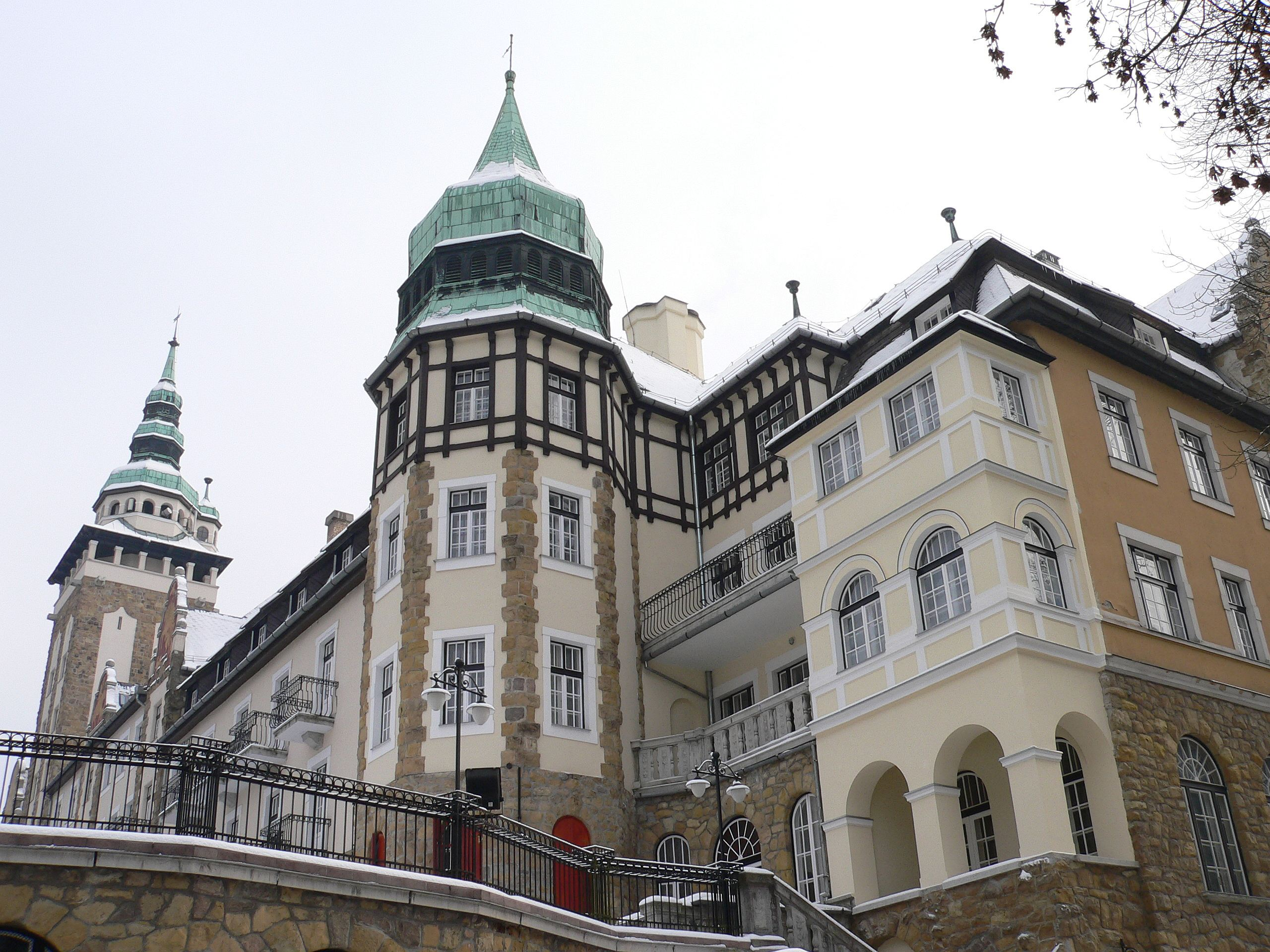
Palace Hotel

The Anna Cave (also called Petőfi Cave) is a natural limestone cave in Miskolc-Lillafüred, Hungary, near the waterfall.

The cave was discovered in 1833, when opening a shaft in the limestone in order to provide the iron furnace at Hámor with water. It soon became a tourist attraction, even Sándor Petőfi visited it in 1847. However, in the second part of the century, when the iron furnaces were closed, the cave was forgotten.

It was opened again in 1912. In 1927, when the Palace Hotel was built, new caverns were found. The entrance that's used today was constructed then.

The cave has not only limestone structures, but also plant fossils.

The cave can be visited all year round.

== See also ==
- István Cave, a large dripstone cave
