= Lillafüred =

Town in Borsod-Abaúj-Zemplén county, Hungary

- Town
- Location within Hungary
- Coordinates: 48°06′N 20°38′E
- Country: Hungary
- County: Borsod-Abaúj-Zemplén

Population
  - Total: 481
- Website: Lillafüred

Lillafüred (Miskolc-Lillafüred) is a town in Borsod-Abaúj-Zemplén county, Hungary. Officially, it is a part of Miskolc, though it is almost 12 kilometres away from the city, in the Bükk Mountains. Lillafüred is a tourist resort.

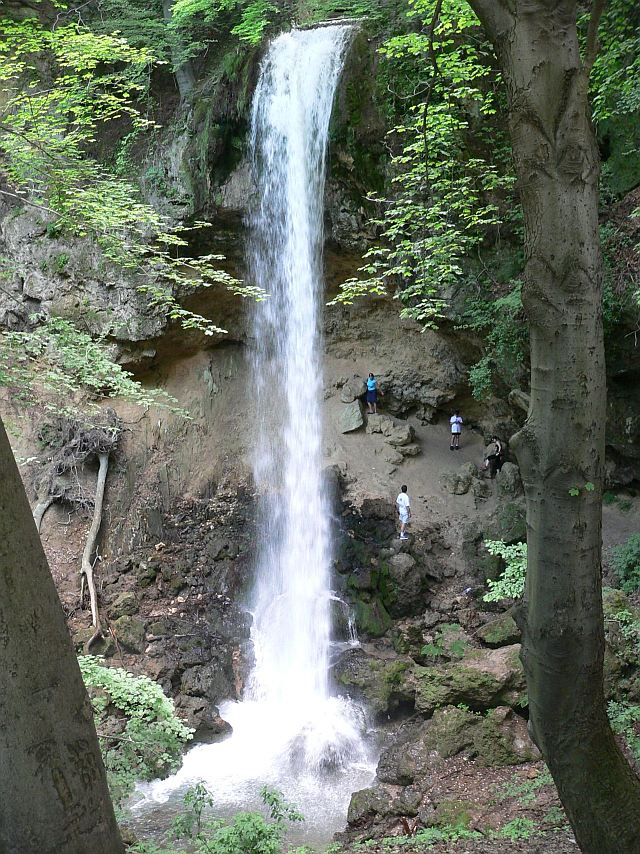
The Lillafüred Waterfall

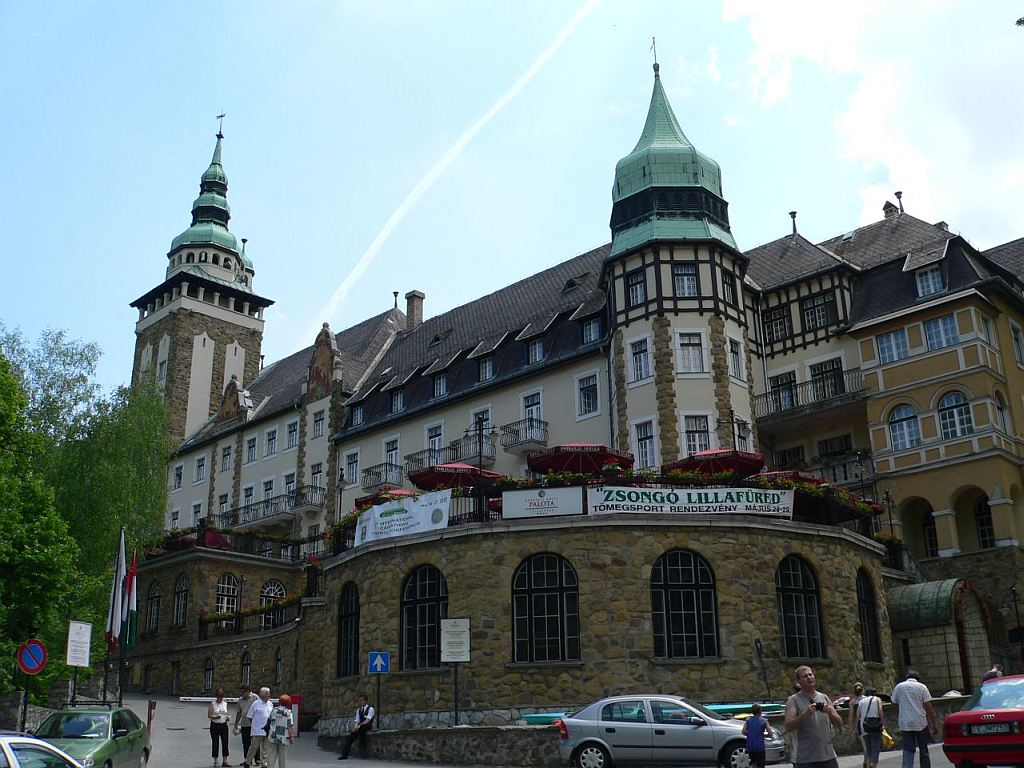
Northern facade of Lillafüred Palace Hotel

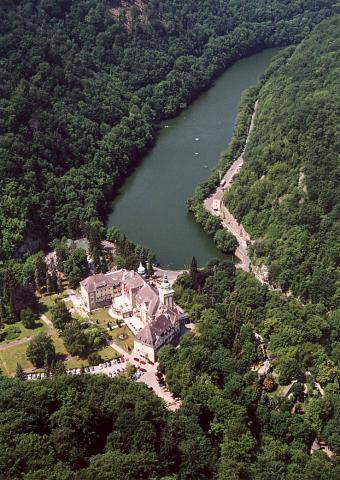
Aerial photograph of the palace

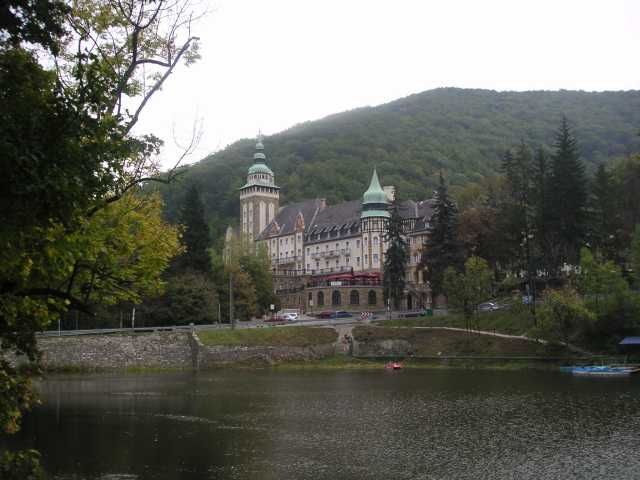
Lake Hámori with Lillafüred Palace Hotel and Bükk Mountains in the background

== History ==
Count András Bethlen of the Bethlen family, who served as Hungary's Minister of Agriculture in the 1890s, initiated the development of a holiday resort near Lake Hámori. He named it after his niece, Erzsébet (nicknamed: "Lilla") Vay, a member of the Vay family and sister of Elemér Vay, the count of Borsod County at the time. The Lillafüred Palace Hotel, a central feature of the resort, was later constructed by István Bethlen.

== Tourist attractions ==
=== Lillafüred Palace Hotel (Palotaszálló) ===
The Lillafüred Palace Hotel was designed by Kálmán Lux and built between 1927 and 1930 in neo-Renaissance style. One of the hotel's restaurants is named after King Matthias. Its stained glass windows show the castles of historical Hungary. The hotel is surrounded by a large park with rare plants.

=== Hanging gardens ===
The hanging gardens are below the hotel, between the streams Szinva and Garadna. The highest waterfall in Hungary, at 20 meters in height, can be found here. The waterfall itself is artificial. The internal water tubes form the "Anna Cave" at the bottom.

=== Caves ===
There are three natural caves not far from the hotel:

- Anna Cave, with plant fossils preserved in limestone;
- István Cave, a large dripstone cave;
- Szeleta Cave, a cave where many Paleolithic relics have been found.

=== Lake Hámori ===
The artificial lake was formed in the early 19th century by the damming of the Szinva and Garadna, to supply the iron furnace with water. The lake is 1.5 kilometres long. In the summer, boats and paddle boats can be rented.

=== Ottó Herman's house ===
A small museum dedicated to the well-known ornithologist and polymath Ottó Herman. (Not to be confused with Ottó Herman Museum, which is in downtown Miskolc).

=== Miller's Rock ===
There are two different local legends explaining why there is a crucifix on the top of the rock. According to the better-known version, the daughter of a rich miller jumped down from the rock with her lover, the miller's poor apprentice, because her parents didn't allow them to marry. The other legend claims an old miller jumped from the rock when he learned that his young wife was cheating on him. This second version is less commonly known, but it was mentioned by the famous author Mór Jókai in one of his books.

=== Fehérkőlápa ===
The area south from Lillafüred Valley gets its name ("marsh of the white stone") from a cliff that provides views of the area and nearby hills. It is a popular hiking destination within Bükk National Park.

=== Trout farm ===
A trout farm is situated a few kilometres away from Lillafüred, and from there visitors can buy freshly grilled or smoked trout. The narrow-gauge train that departs from Miskolc makes a stop at the farm on the days it is open. The stop is after the main Lillafüred stop.

=== Hámor Rock ===
Used by rock climbers, climbing competitions are held at Hámor Rock every January.
