= Bükk National Park =

National park in Hungary

- IUCN category II (national park)
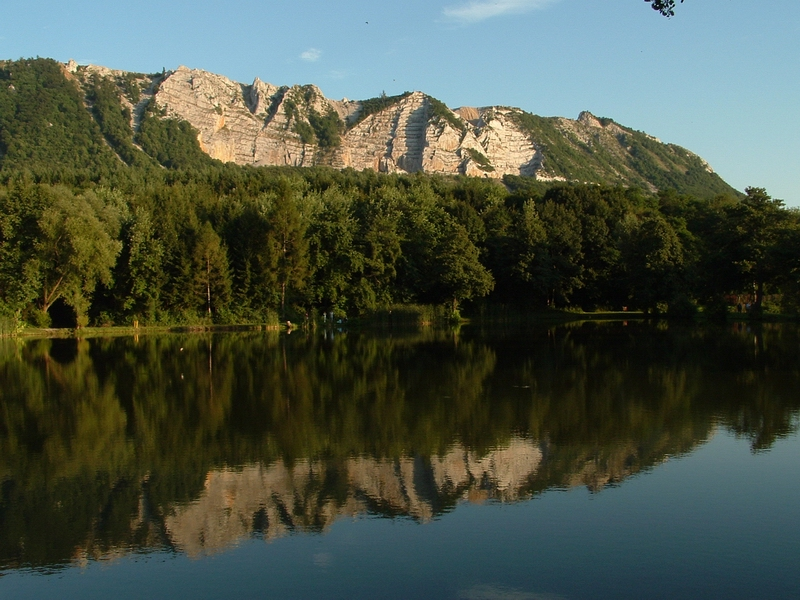

- Location within Hungary
- Location: Hungary
- Nearest city: Miskolc, Hungary
- Coordinates: 48.04°N 20.53°E
- Area: 431.3 km^{2} (166.5 sq mi)
- Established: 1977

Bükk National Park (Hungarian: Bükki Nemzeti Park) is a national park in the Bükk Mountains of Northern Hungary, near Miskolc. It was founded in 1977 as the third national park in the country. It contains 431.3 km^{2} (of which 37.74 km^{2} is under increased protection). Mountainous and forested, Bükk is Hungary's largest national park and is situated in the northern mountains, between Szilvásvárad and Lillafüred. Bükk's important geological features include various karst formations within its limestone mountains - particularly caves (once inhabited by pre-historic people), swallow-holes, and ravines. The country's longest (4,000 metres) and deepest (245 metres) cave, Istvánlápa, is located in the park. Bükk National Park also contains ninety species of nesting birds, some considered endangered.

The Vatican Climate Forest was to be located within the Park. KlimaFa ("Climate Trees") was started by a San Francisco promoter, Russ George, who promised a carbon offsetting project, intended to offset the Vatican's carbon dioxide emissions. However, no trees have been planted. In an interview with the Christian Science Monitor, Lajos Kiss, mayor of the village of Tiszakeszi pointed out an empty area along the Tisza River where the trees were supposed to be planted. The Monitor also said the Vatican was considering "legal action in order to defend the Vatican’s reputation".

== See also ==
- List of national parks of Hungary
- Bükk culture
