= Bükkszentlászló =

Bükkszentlászló Stará Huta (Slovak)
- Former municipality
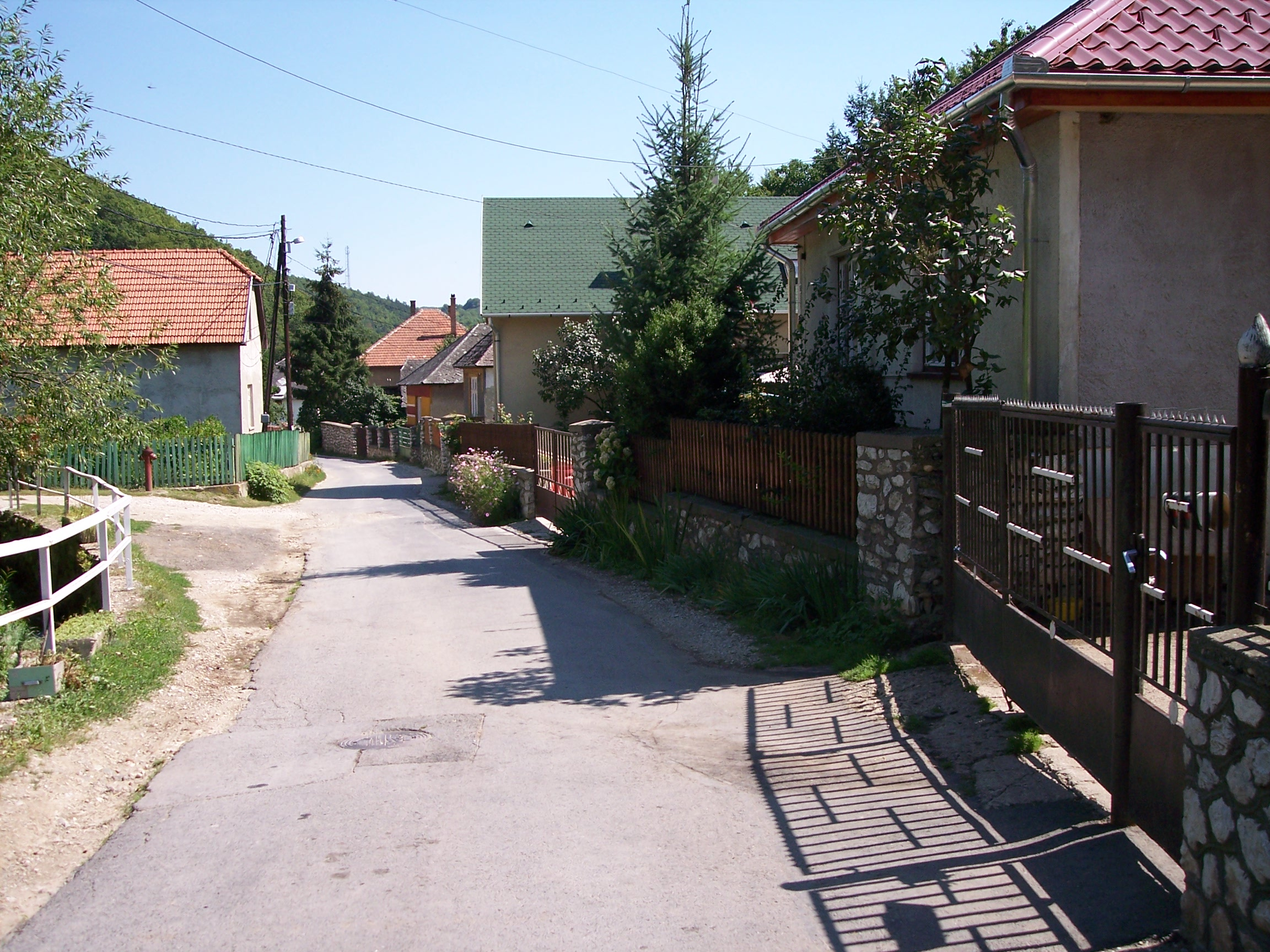
- Main street of Bükkszentlászló

- Location within Hungary
- Country: Hungary
- Regions: Northern Hungary
- County: Borsod-Abaúj-Zemplén County
- District: Miskolc District

Area
  - Total: 17.08 km^{2} (6.59 sq mi)

Population (2022)
  - Total: 516
  - Density: 30.2/km^{2} (78.2/sq mi)
- Time zone: UTC+1 (CET)
  - Summer (DST): UTC+2 (CEST)
- Postal code: 3510
- Area code: (+36) 46

Bükkszentlászló (Slovak: Stará Huta) was a village in Borsod-Abaúj-Zemplén County Northern Hungary. Since 1981, it has been a part of the city of Miskolc.

== History ==
The area has been inhabited since ancient times; archaeological findings indicate that Celtic tribes settled here. The village itself isn't too old when compared to other Hungarian towns and villages; it was founded in the 18th century as the first of four villages inhabited by the glassworks workers of the area.

In the 18th century, the owners of the Diósgyőr estate decided that it would be useful to build glassworks factories, since the area is rich in wood. Since almost no one in Hungary knew anything about glass making, they invited Czech, Slovak, Polish and German workers. The glass manufacturing began in 1712-1713. The village came into being around this time, and for a long time it was inhabited by Slovaks and Germans only. Its name was Hutta, from the word huta meaning glassworks.

In 1755, another glassmaker village was founded. To avoid confusing, the residents named it New Huta, while the older village was named Old Huta. New Huta is called Bükkszentkereszt today.

In 1940, the village took the name Bükkszentlászló, which refers to the Bükk mountains and to King Ladislaus I, the patron saint of the village's church.

In 1981, Bükkszentlászló was annexed to Miskolc. It was the last village annexed to a city in the Socialist era of Hungary, when many villages were annexed to nearby cities.
