= Görömböly =

Görömböly Герембель (Rusyn) Miskolc-Görömböly
- Former municipality
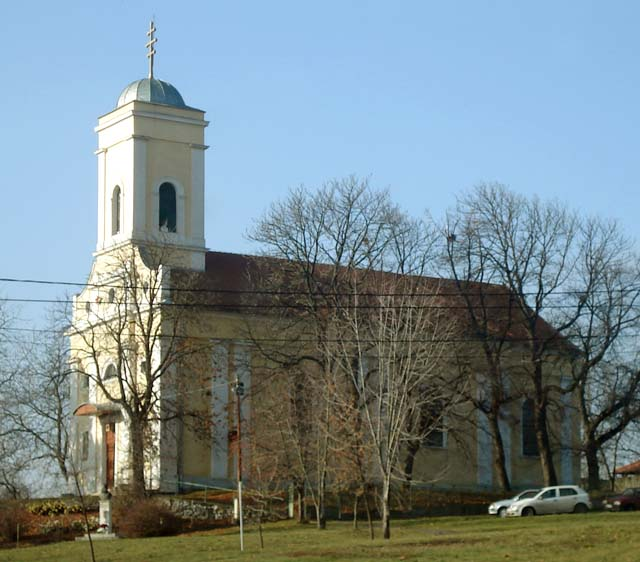
- Greek Catholic church

- Location within Hungary
- Country: Hungary
- Regions: Northern Hungary
- County: Borsod-Abaúj-Zemplén County
- District: Miskolc District
- Time zone: UTC+1 (CET)
  - Summer (DST): UTC+2 (CEST)
- Postal code: 3516
- Area code: (+36) 46
- Website: www.miskolc-goromboly.hu

Görömböly (Rusyn: Герембель) was a village in Borsod-Abaúj-Zemplén County, northern Hungary. Now it is part of the city of Miskolc.

== Geography ==
The village is located at the foot of the Bükk Mountains, about five kilometres from the city centre of Miskolc.

== History ==
The first mention of the village dates back to a record from 1365. In it, King Sigismund granted the land to the Balassa family and the Tapolca Abbey.

In the early 18th century, plague epidemic struck the village, causing significant losses. Most of its Hungarian residents moved to neighboring Miskolc. Their places were taken by Rusyn settlers. The 1810 Tapolca Abbey census notes that the villagers of Görömböly spoke Rusyn and Hungarian.

Görömböly was once known for their wine. However, due to a spread of Phylloxera, the amount of vineyards in the city plummeted. At one point, it had 1048 hectares of vineyards, though people still produce grapes in cellars, therefore keeping their village's character.

== Gallery ==
Roman Catholic church

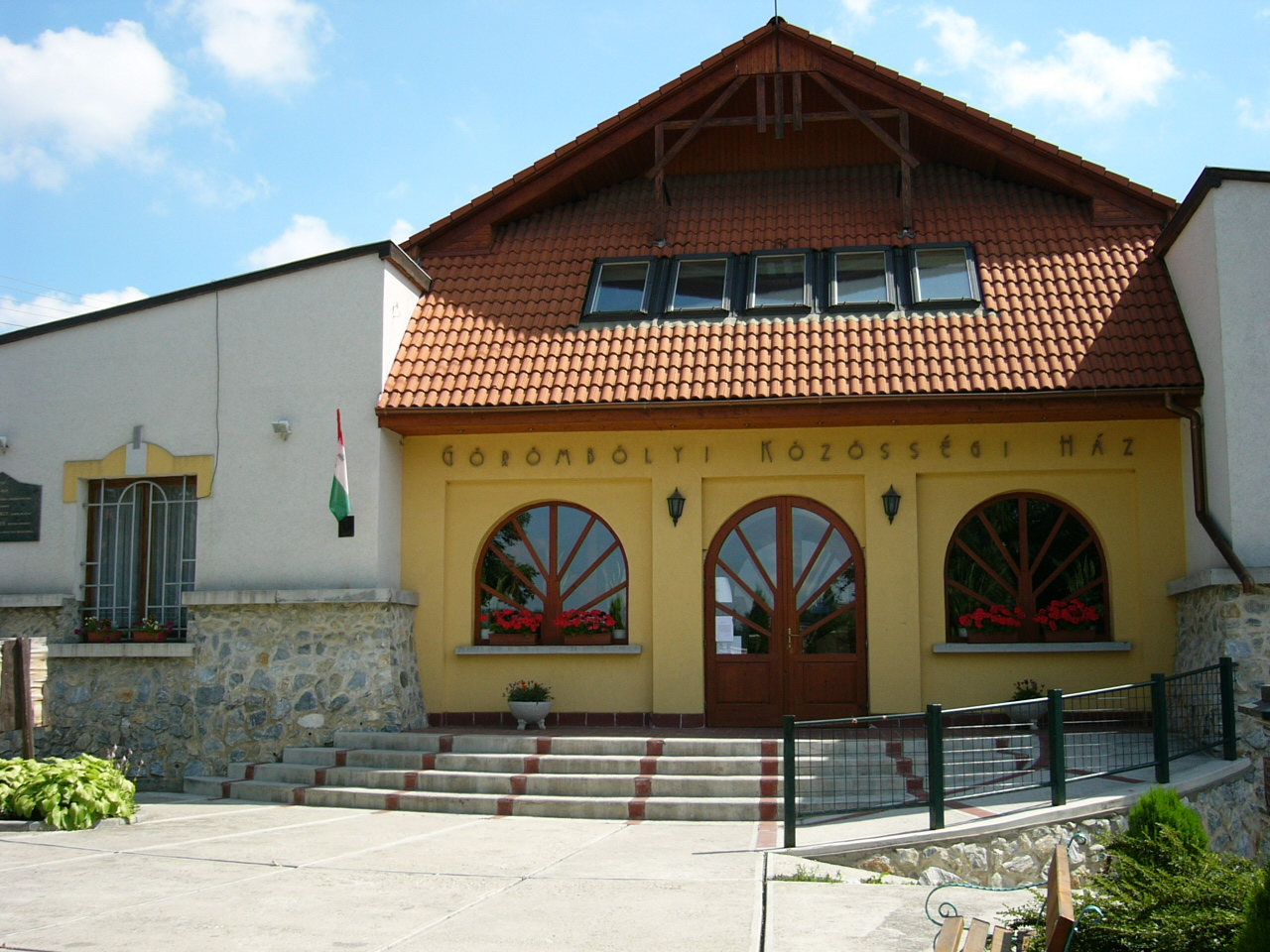
Communal Hall

Greek Catholic church

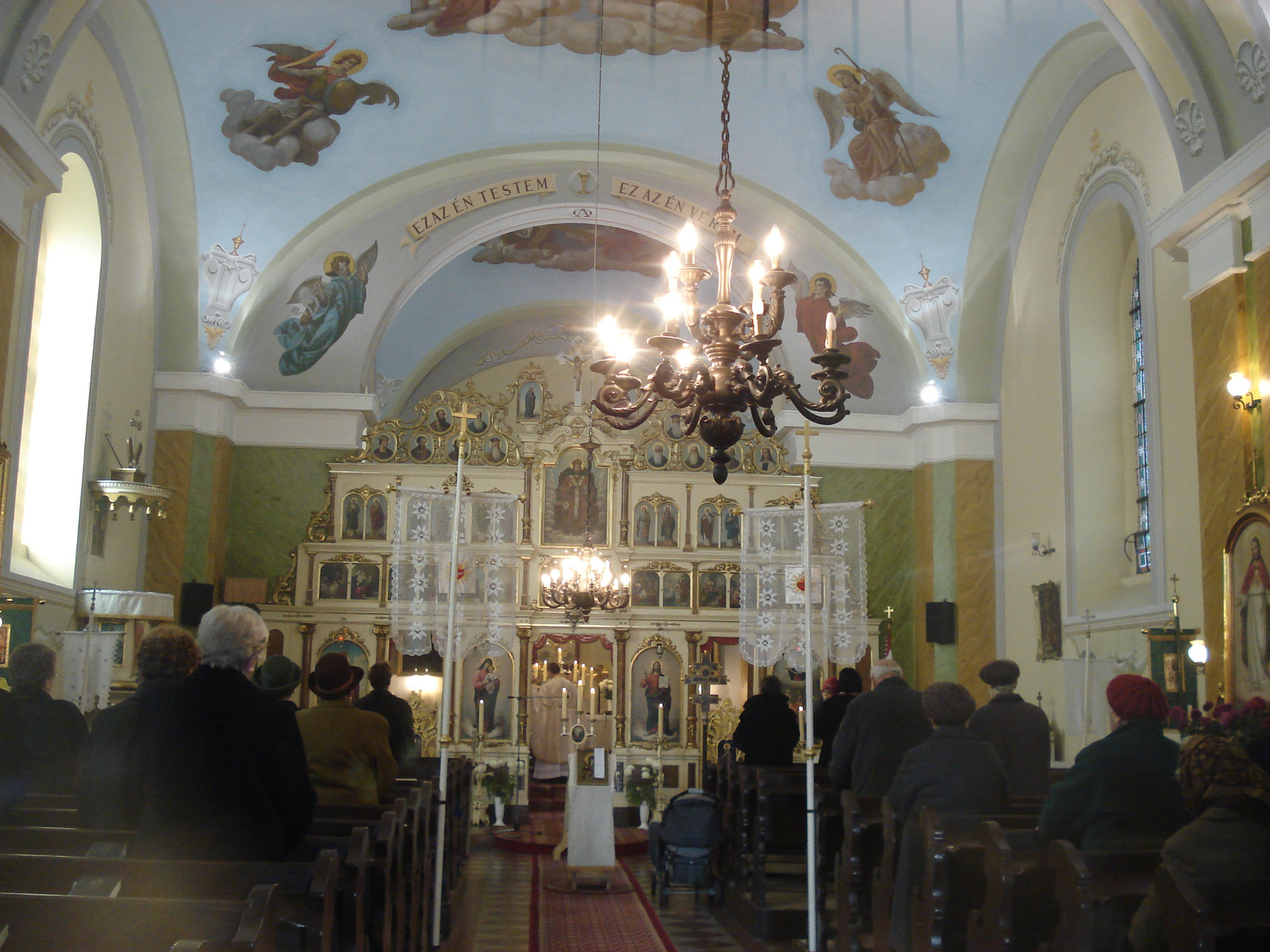
Interior of the Greek Catholic church

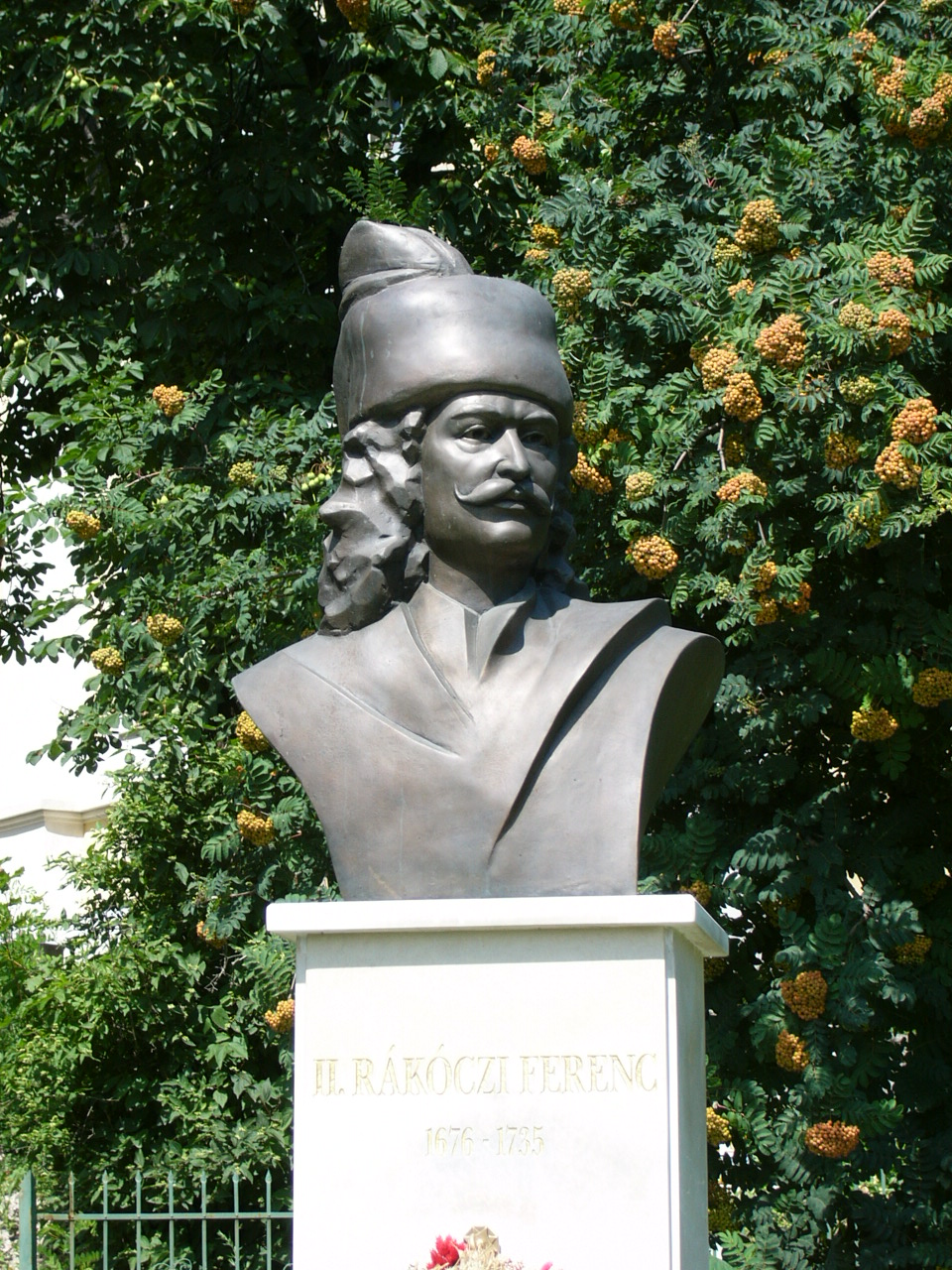
Bust of Francis II Rákóczi built by the local Rusyn minority self-government
