= Bükk =

Section of the North Hungarian Mountains

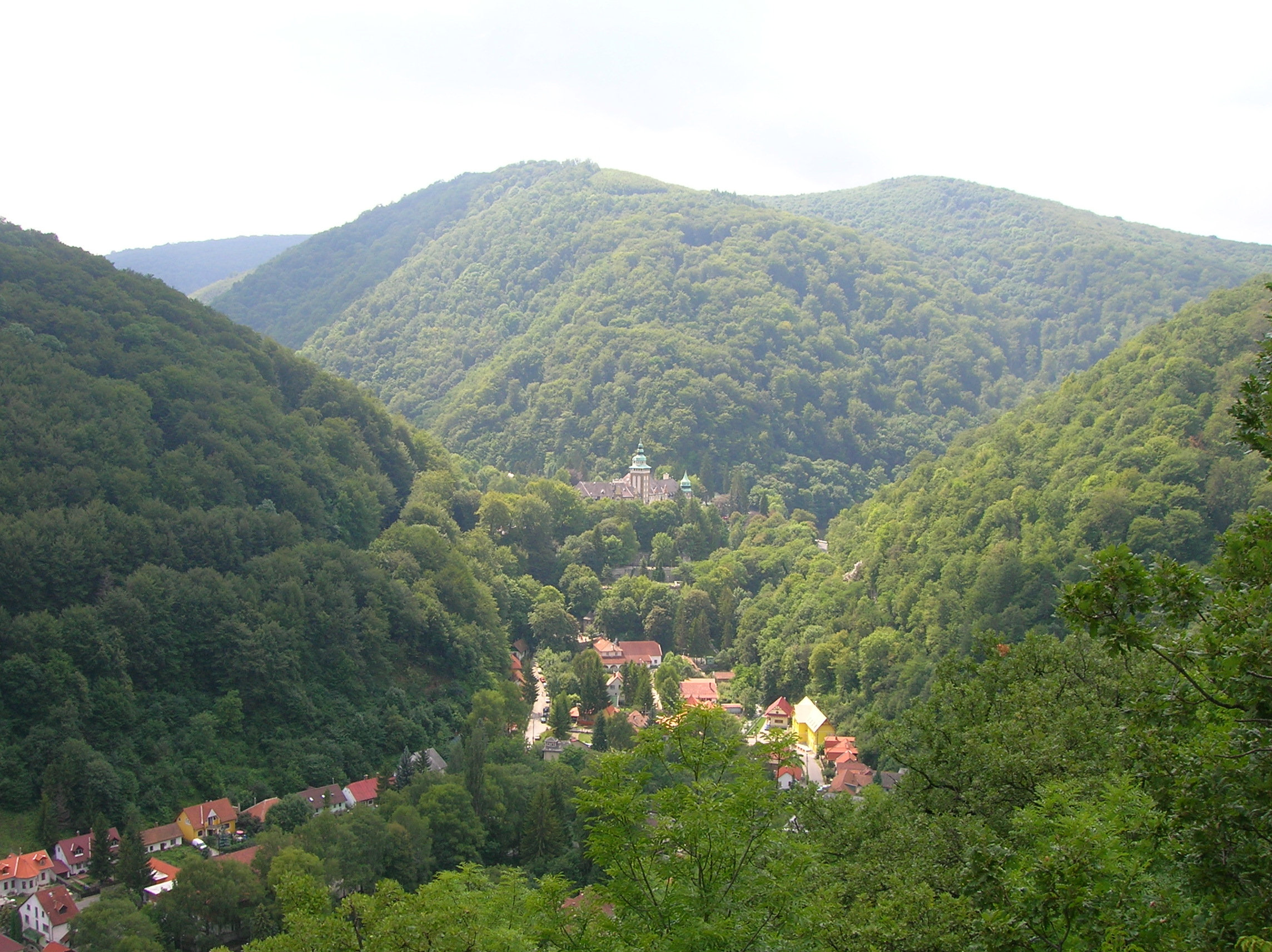
- Alsó-Hámor viewed from Szeleta cave.
- Interactive map of Bükk
- Coordinates: 48°05′N 20°30′E
- Country: Hungary
- Counties: Borsod & Heves
- Highest elevation: 960.7 m (3,152 ft)

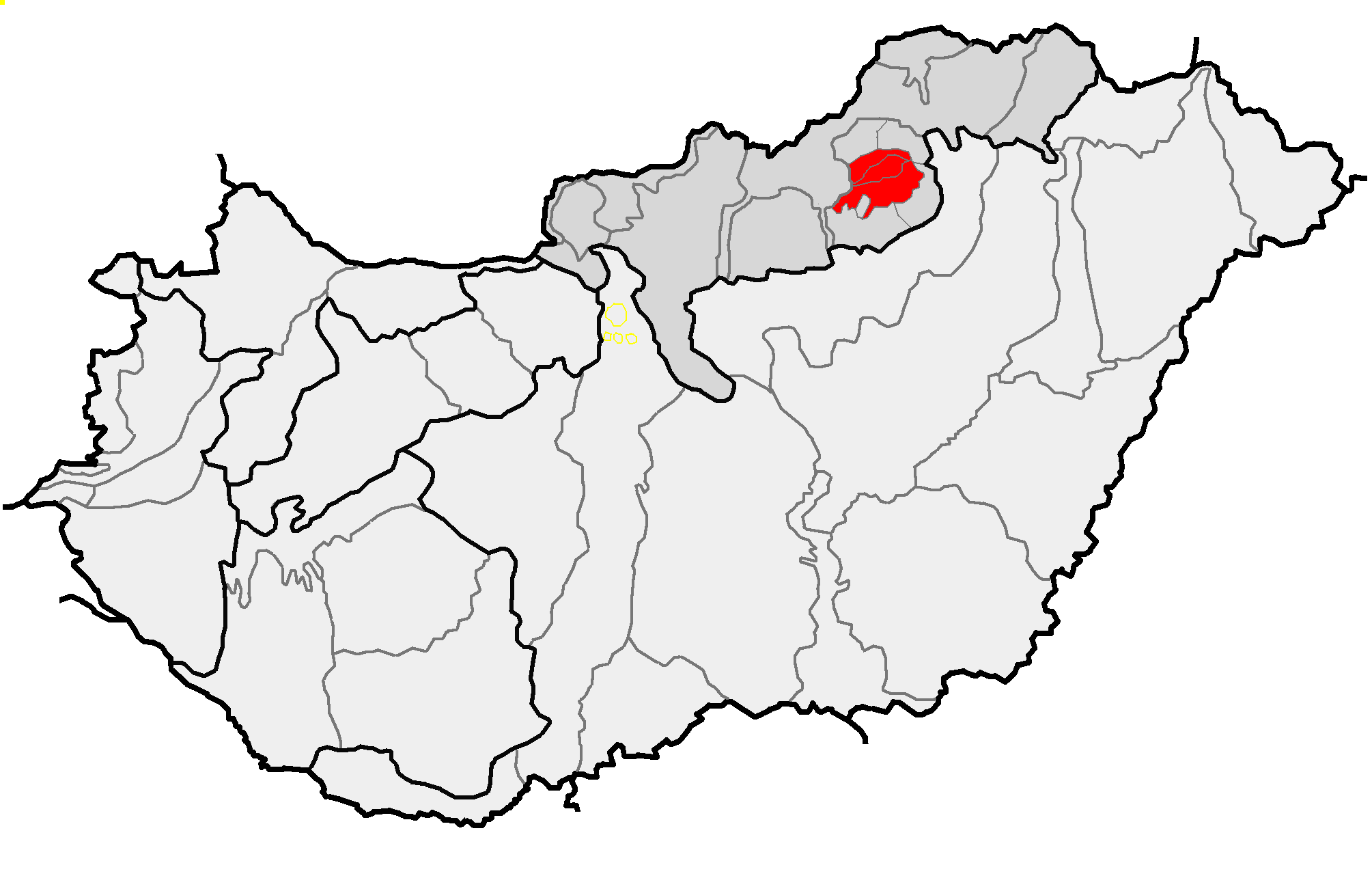
Location of Bükk Mountains within physical subdivisions of Hungary

The Bükk Mountains (Hungarian: [ˈbykː]) are a section of the North Hungarian Mountains of the Inner Western Carpathians. Much of the area is included in the Bükk National Park.

== Geography ==
Although Kékes, the highest point in Hungary, is not here but in the nearby Mátra Mountains, the average height of the Bükk Mountains–with more than 20 peaks higher than 900 m–exceeds that of Mátra. The highest point of Bükk is Kettős bérc (961 m), the third highest main peak in Hungary after Kékes and Galyatető.

There are 1,115 known caves in the mountain range, including Bányász-barlang (Miner cave, 274 m) and István-lápa (254 m), the deepest caves in Hungary, the archaeologically important Szeleta cave, the Cave Bath (a main tourist attraction of Miskolc-Tapolca), the Anna Cave, and the István Cave. 52 of the caves are protected because of their fauna and microclimate.

The mountain range was also famous for its skiing facilities located around Bánkút.

== Gallery ==
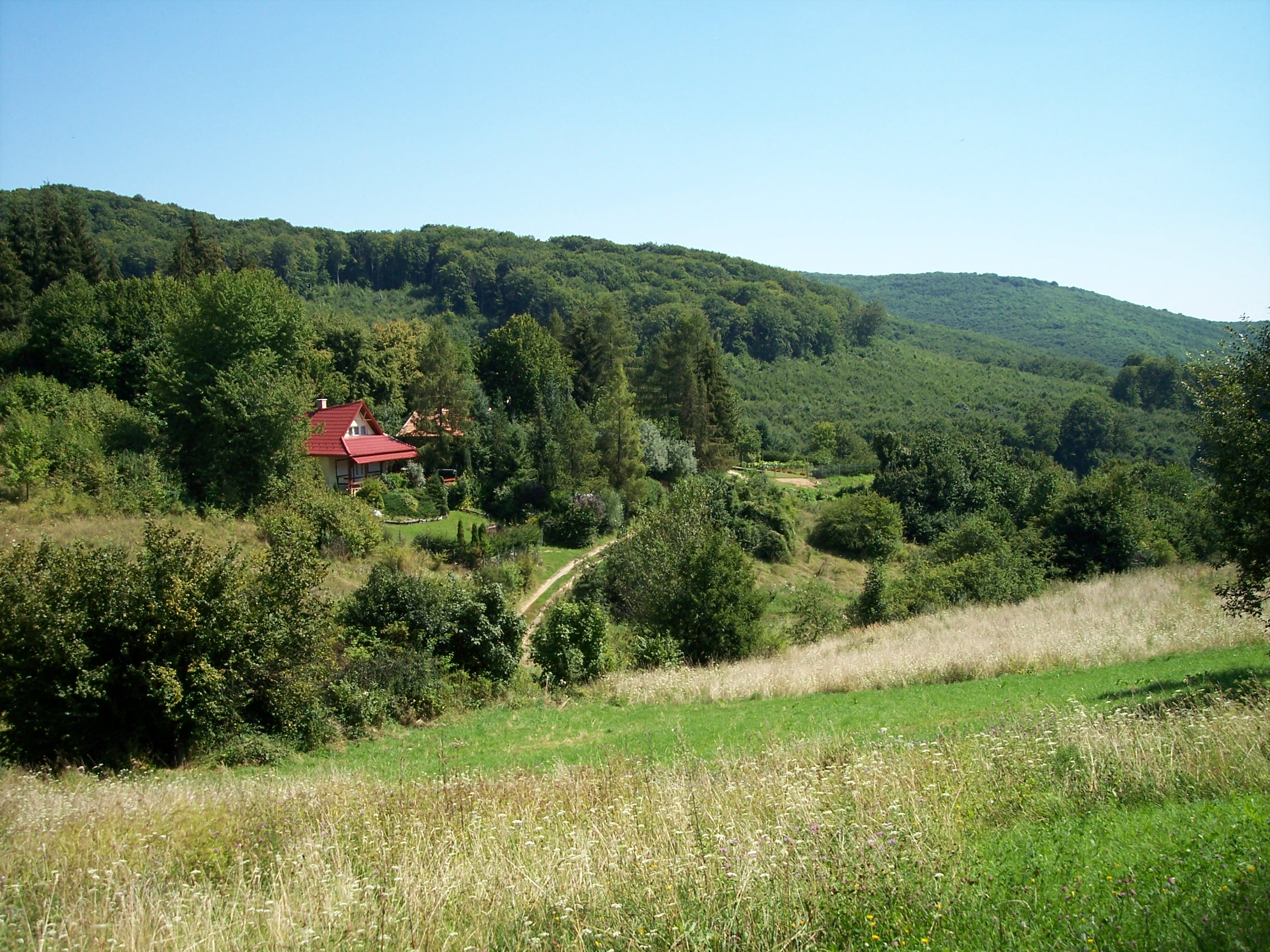
Forest near Bükkszentkereszt.

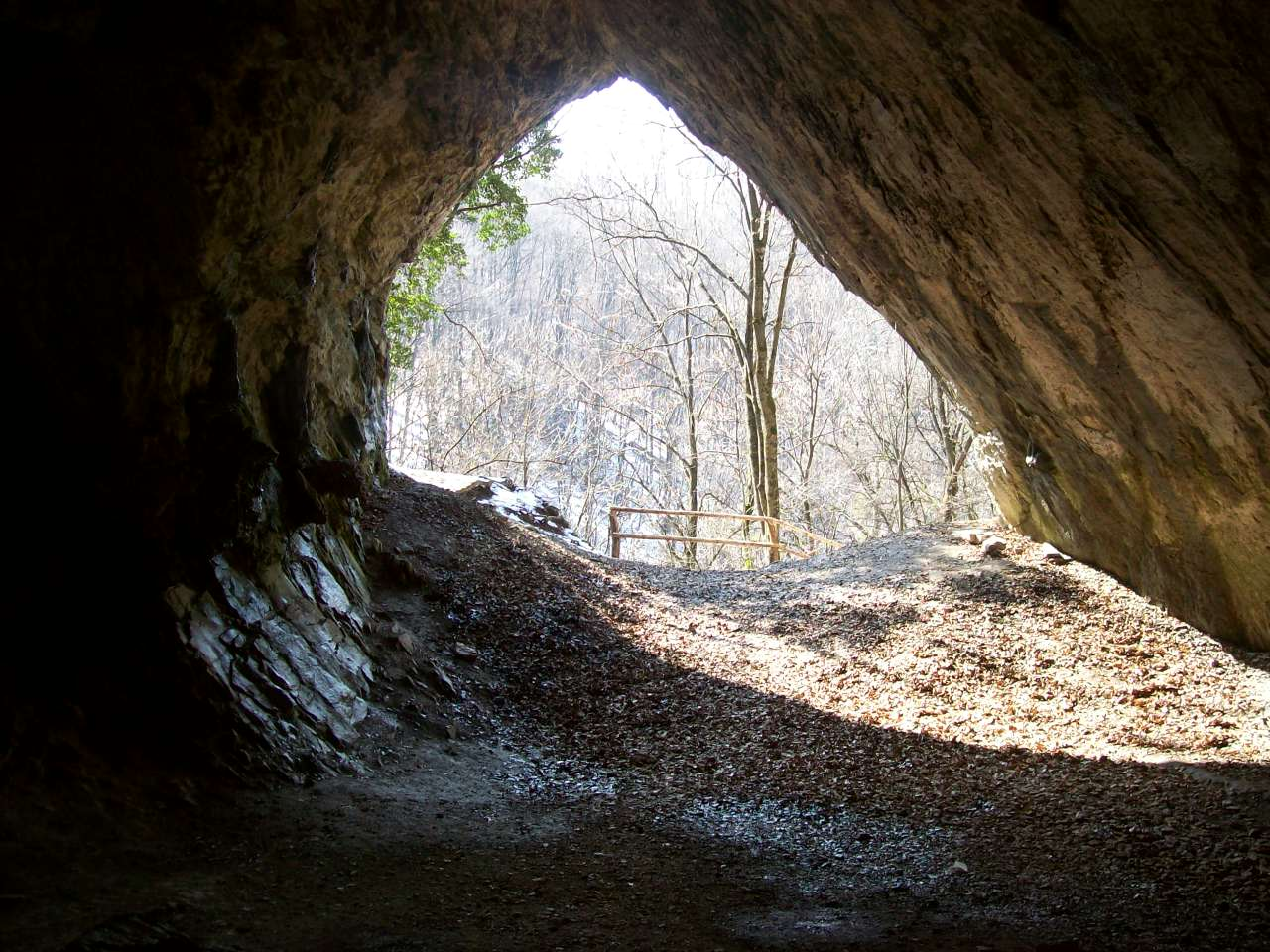
Entrance of Istállós-kő Cave

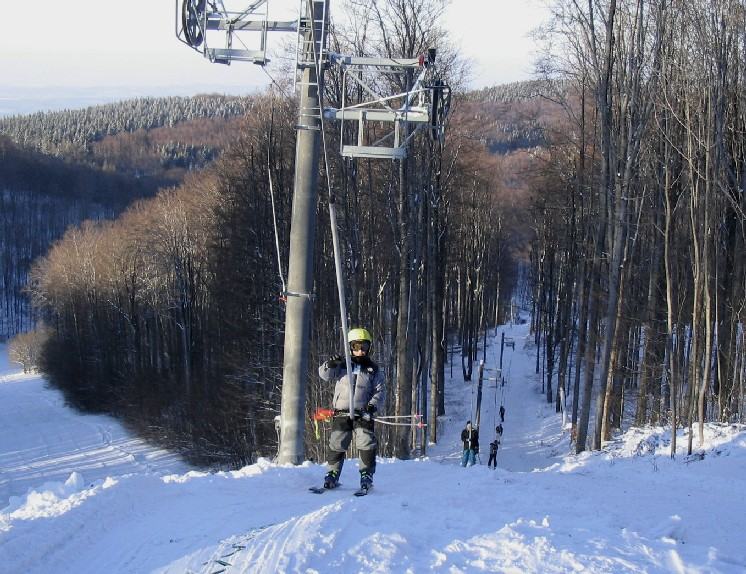
Ski lifts and slopes covered with natural snow in 2006
