= István Cave =

Cave in Miskolc, Hungary

Coordinates: 48°05′N 20°37′E

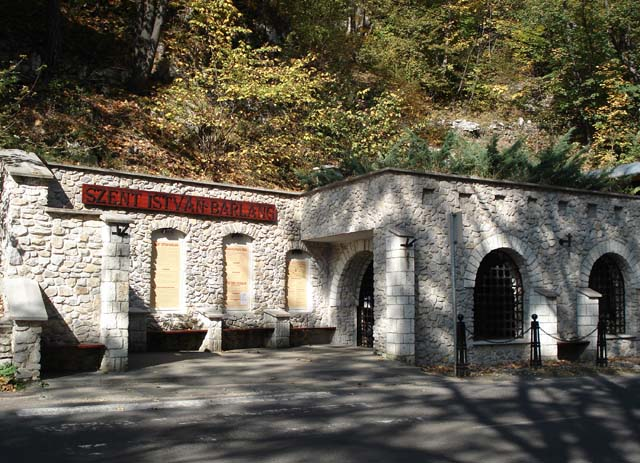
The cave entrance

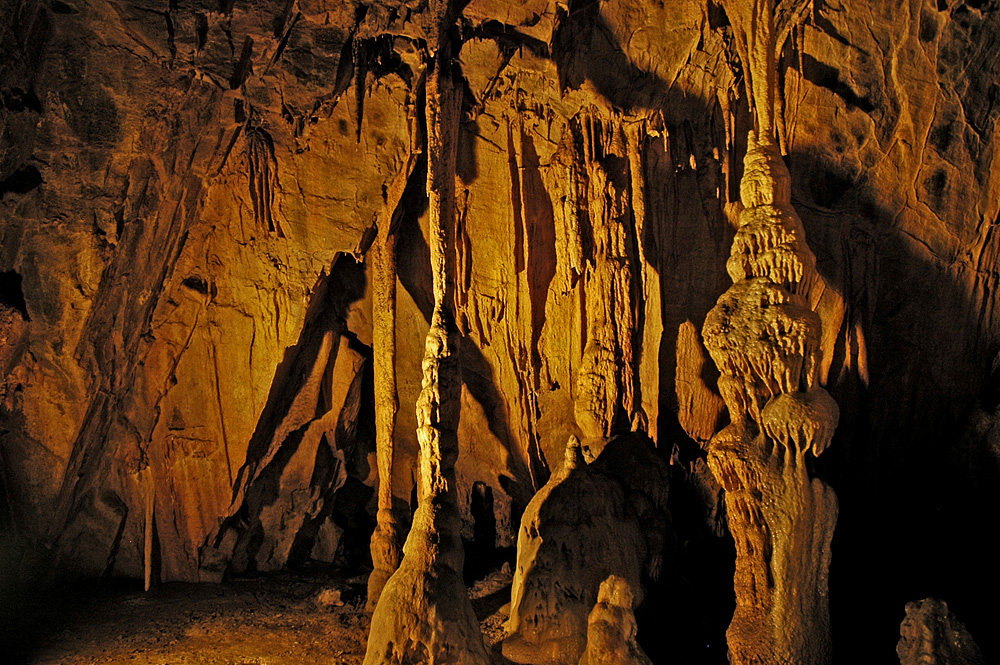
Columns in the cave

The István Cave (St. Stephen's Cave) is a limestone cave in Miskolc-Lillafüred, Northern Hungary.

The cave was formed in the Triassic period and is about 710 m long. It was discovered in 1913. According to local legend, a dog fell into a 15-metre deep shaft, which was the cave's only natural opening. People found the cave when they rescued the dog. Cavers began to explore the cave in 1927. Another entrance was made for the tourists, and in 1931 the cave was opened to the public.

During World War II, the cave was damaged, with many of the stalagmites and stalactites were broken by people seeking refuge from air raids. The lighting was repaired only in 1955, and the cave was opened to the public again.

The cave is still being explored, but only a part can be visited. Its deepest known area is named Hell. The most beautiful dripstone structures are the Mammut's Mouth, Fairyland, Column Hall and Concert Hall. Due to water filling the cave in 1958 and 1974, the inner caverns are presumably connected with water drains.

Because of the lighting, moss has appeared in the cave. This problem was solved by installing a different kind of lighting.

The air in the cave is very clear and has a high humidity. Patients with respiratory illnesses are treated here.
