= Tiszakeszi =

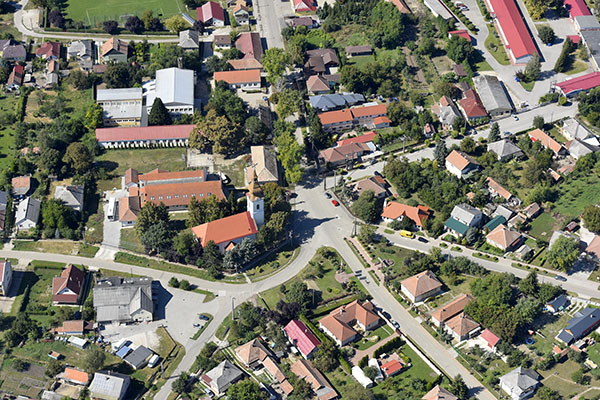
- Aerial view

- Flag Coat of arms

- Location of Tiszakeszi
- Coordinates: 47.72923°N 20.94276°E
- Country: Hungary
- County: Borsod-Abaúj-Zemplén

Area
  - Total: 46.19 km^{2} (17.83 sq mi)

Population (2004)
  - Total: 2,682
  - Density: 58.06/km^{2} (150.4/sq mi)
- Time zone: UTC+1 (CET)
  - Summer (DST): UTC+2 (CEST)
- Postal code: 3458
- Area code: 49

Tiszakeszi is a village in Borsod-Abaúj-Zemplén county, Hungary. It is not connected to any railway networks. An estimated 30% of the population in Tiszakeszi are Romani people.
