= List of schools in Hungary =

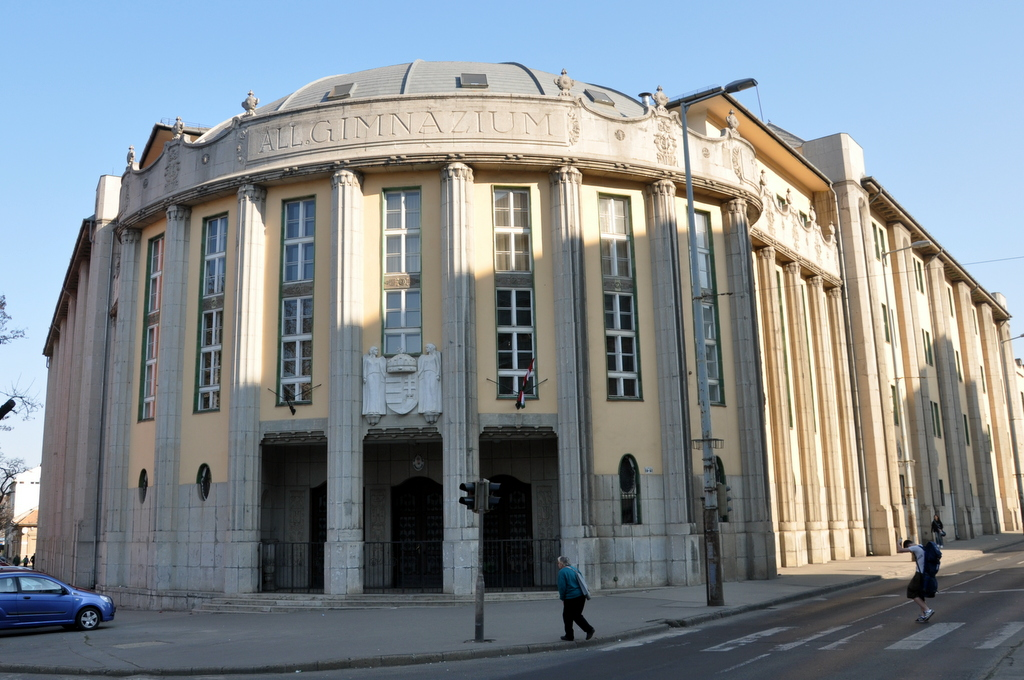
Szent László Gimnázium

This is a list of notable secondary schools in Hungary:

- Alternative Secondary School of Economics, Budapest
- Avasi Grammar School, Miskolc
- Béla III Gymnasium, Baja
- Berzeviczy Gergely School of Trade and Catering, Miskolc
- Berzsenyi Dániel Gimnázium, Budapest
- Bornemisza Péter Gymnasium, Budapest
- Deák Ferenc Bilingual High School, Szeged
- Diósgyőri Gimnázium, Miskolc
- Budapesti Evangélikus Gimnázium (Fasori Gimnázium), Budapest
- Fáy András Economic High School, Miskolc
- Fazekas Mihály Gimnázium, Budapest
- Fazekas Mihály Gimnázium, Debrecen
- Fejér Megyei Eötvös József Szakképző Iskola és Kollégium, Seregélyes
- Fényi Gyula Jesuit High School, Miskolc
- Ferenc Földes Gymnasium, Miskolc
- Gandhi School, Pécs
- Gyula Andrássy Gymnasium, Békéscsaba
- Herman Ottó Gimnázium, Miskolc
- Irinyi János Reformed Secondary School, Kazincbarcika
- Jedlik Ányos Gymnasium, Budapest
- Lévay József Református Gimnázium és Diákotthon, Miskolc
- Móra Ferenc Secondary School, Kiskunfélegyháza
- Móricz Zsigmond Gymnasium, Budapest
- Pannonhalmi Bencés Gimnázium és Kollégium, Pannonhalma
- Saint Stephen Vocational Secondary School of Economics, Budapest
- Szent László Gimnázium, Budapest
- Szepsi Csombor Márton High School, Szikszó
- Teleki Blanka Gymnasium, Budapest
- Váci Mihály Kollégium, Budapest
- Varga Katalin Gymnasium, Szolnok
- Veres Pálné Gymnasium, Budapest
- Veres Péter Gimnázium, Budapest
- Verseghy Ferenc Gymnasium, Szolnok
- Zrínyi Ilona Gymnasium, Miskolc

International schools:

- American International School of Budapest, Nagykovácsi
- Britannica International School Budapest, Budapest
- The Budapest Japanese School, Budapest
- Gustave Eiffel French School of Budapest, Budapest
- International Christian School of Budapest, Diósd
- International School of Budapest, Budapest
- Serbian Kindergarten, Primary School, High School and Students' Home, Budapest
- Thomas Mann Gymnasium, Budapest

== See also ==
- Open access in Hungary to scholarly communication
