= AKG =

AKG may refer to:

- alpha-Ketoglutaric acid, also known as 2-Ketoglutaric acid, 2-Oxopentanedioic acid, 2-Oxoglutamate, 2-Oxoglutaric acid & Oxoglutaric acid
- Asian Kung-Fu Generation, a Japanese rock band
- Alternatív Közgazdasági Gimnázium, a high school in Budapest, Hungary
- A. K. Gopalan (1904–1977), Indian communist leader
- A. K. G. (film), a 2007 Indian Malayalam documentary film
- The ICAO Code for No. 84 Squadron RAF, UK
- AKG (company), an acoustics engineering and manufacturing company
- Buffalo AKG Art Museum, an art museum in Buffalo, New York
