= Tibor Kovács =

Hungarian petroleum engineer and politician (born 1952)

Member of the National Assembly
- In office 28 June 1994 – 5 May 2014

Personal details
- Born: 8 September 1952 (age 74) Sőrekút (today Nyírtelek), Hungary
- Party: MSZMP (1979–89); MSZP (since 1989)
- Profession: chemical engineer, politician

Tibor Kovács (born 8 September 1952) is a Hungarian petroleum engineer and politician, member of the National Assembly (MP) for Tiszaújváros (Borsod-Abaúj-Zemplén County Constituency XII) from 1994 to 2010. He was also a Member of Parliament from the national list of the Hungarian Socialist Party (MSZP) between 2010 and 2014.

== Studies and works ==
Kovács was born into a Catholic farmer family in Sőrekút (today Nyírtelek, Szabolcs-Szatmár-Bereg County) (Note: The town was separated from Nyíregyháza and became an independent settlement in January 1952 under the name Sőrekút. It was renamed to Nyírtelek still in that year, in November 1952.) on 8 September 1952. He attended elementary school in Nyíregyháza. He graduated from the Irinyi János Chemical Technical School of Kazincbarcika in 1971. He obtained degree in petroleum engineering at the Oil & Gas University of Ploiești in the Socialist Republic of Romania in 1977. He spent his compulsory military service in Zalaegerszeg between 1977 and 1978. He obtained a degree of economic engineer at the Budapest University of Technology in 1986. He worked for the National Petroleum and Gas Trust (OKGT) and its successor company the MOL Group in Tiszaújváros from 1977 to 1994.

He married physician Tímea Szinku in 1983. They have two daughters Tímea (b. 1985) and Lilla (b. 1988).

== Political career ==
He joined the Hungarian Socialist Workers' Party (MSZMP) in 1979, but did not hold any party functions. During the end of communism, he became a founding member of the Hungarian Socialist Party (MSZP) in October 1989. He was appointed a board member of the party branch in Tiszaújváros. He was elected a member to the representative body of the town in 1992. Since then, he was elected local representative five times until his retirement from politics in 2014. Kovács became chairman of the Socialist Party branch in Tiszaújváros in 2000, when he was also elected to the presidium of the Borsod-Abaúj-Zemplén County branch.

Kovács was elected Member of Parliament for Tiszaújváros during the 1994 parliamentary election; he obtained 55.19 percent of the vote in the second round. In his first parliamentary term, he worked in the Committee on European Integration. Kovács was re-elected MP either in 1998, 2002 and 2006. He was involved in the Economic Committee and its several sub-committees (1998–2004), Audit Committee (2002–2003) Budget and Finance Committee (2003–2010; vice-chairman until 2004).

During the 2010 parliamentary election, Kovács lost to Roland Mengyi (Fidesz), but was elected MP from his party's national list. He was a member of the Economic and Information Technology Committee from 2010 to 2014, serving its vice-chairman from 2011. He also worked in the Health Committee between 2010 and 2011. Kovács did not run in the 2014 parliamentary election.
