= Békásmegyer =

Former village, neighbourhood of Budapest

Coordinates: 47°36′N 19°03′E

Békásmegyer Budapest III. kerülete
- District of Budapest
- 3rd District
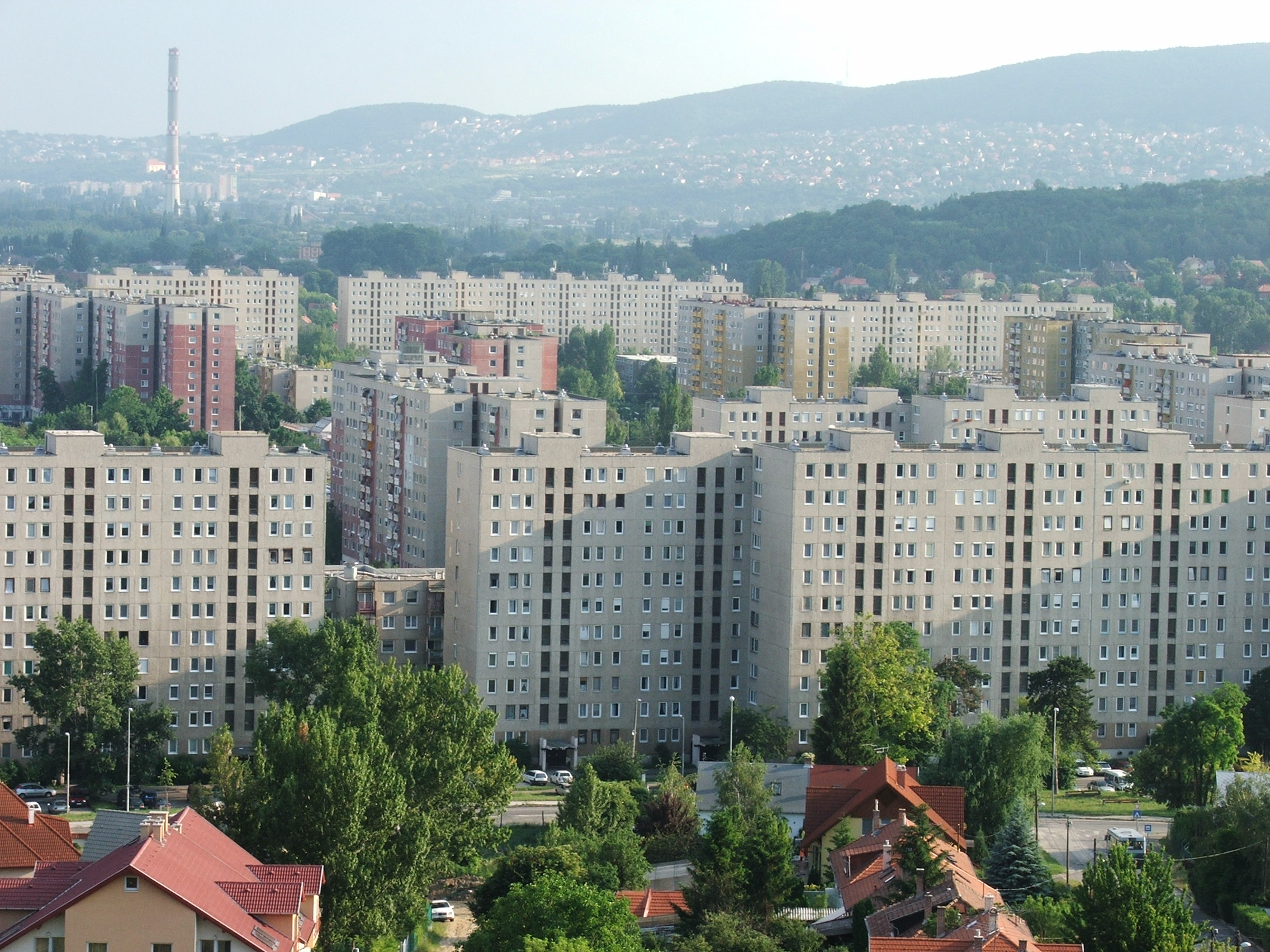

- Flag Coat of arms
- Interactive map of Békásmegyer
- Country: Hungary
- City: Budapest

Area
  - Total: 4.78 km^{2} (1.85 sq mi)

Population (2023)
  - Total: 122 661
  - Density: 3,090/km^{2} (8,000/sq mi)
- Time zone: UTC+1 (CET)
  - Summer (DST): UTC+2 (CEST)
- Website: obuda.hu

Békásmegyer (German: Krottendorf) is a neighbourhood in Budapest, Hungary. It belongs administratively to the 3rd District. Békásmegyer consists of two different parts, a huge high-rise housing estate and the traditional Ófalu ("Old Village") with older houses. Békásmegyer is divided into two by Suburban railway line H5. Békásmegyer left-side or mountain side and Békásmegyer right-side or Danube side. The left side was an independent village until 1 January 1950, when it was merged into Budapest, while the right side was a water reservoir of the Danube river. Today 41,000 people live in Békásmegyer Microdistrict (13,394 panel flats) and a few thousand in the former village building.

== Important buildings and institutions ==
=== Education ===
- Czucor Gergely Primary School and Gymnasium
- Veres Péter Secondary School of Békásmegyer
- Bárczi Géza Primary School
- Medgyesi Ferenc street Primary School
- Pais Dezső Primary School
- Milton Fridman University
- Zipernowsky Károly Primary School

=== Religion ===
- Beatified Özséb Parish church
- Saint Joseph church
- Lutheran Congregation of Békásmegyer
- Békásmegyer Calvary

=== Other ===
- Community Center
- Marketplace of Békásmegyer

== Location ==
Békásmegyer is located in the northwestern part of Budapest's 3rd district. The area is near the Danube River and lies at the foot of the Pilis Mountains to the north. Neighboring areas include Óbuda and, to the north, Szentendre. Békásmegyer is primarily composed of residential neighborhoods, including panel buildings and smaller residential complexes. The area also features green spaces, parks, and promenades, providing a pleasant environment for residents.It is situated on the edge of Budapest next to Budakalász, and the edge of the Danube river. Békásmegyer has the last train station within the capital district of Budapest, which is the H5 HÉV suburban railway line.

== Surrounding areas ==
Békásmegyer is located in the 3rd district of Budapest, and the following towns and neighborhoods are located nearby:

- 1.Óbuda – Directly adjacent to Békásmegyer, also part of the 3rd district. Óbuda is one of the oldest districts in Budapest and lies southwest of Békásmegyer.
- 2.Szentendre – Located to the north of Békásmegyer, in the direction of the Pilis Mountains. Szentendre is a well-known artistic town situated north of Budapest, in the Danube Bend.
- 3.Péterhalom – A smaller area, but still located near the 3rd district, to the northwest of Békásmegyer.
- 4.Hévízgyörk – This town is located outside Budapest's administrative boundaries, but it is in close proximity to the area.
- 5.Üröm – A town located to the northwest of Békásmegyer, near the Pilis Mountains, just outside the capital.

== Public transportation ==
There are many modes of transportation in Békásmegyer. It is easy to get here, and from here, it's also easy to reach the city center or even go outside of Budapest. Here are the main public transportation options available in the area:

- Bus lines: 34, 134, 160, 204, 243, 296
- Long distance bus lines: 869
- Night bus lines: 923, 934, 943, 960
- Suburban railway (HÉV) lines: H5

== History ==
- First Mentions and Early History:
  - 1368: First mention, the area was owned by the nuns of Óbuda.
  - 1477: The land becomes the property of the Pilis Abbey.
  - Early decades of Ottoman rule: The village prospered, with 35 taxpaying houses in 1580-81.
  - By the second half of the 17th century, the village was completely destroyed, and it was not mentioned between 1690-95. By 1727, it was deserted.
- Settlers' Arrival and Development (1740s):
  - German settlers arrived, creating a flourishing community.
  - In the first half of the 18th century: Krottendorf became a 1054-hectare German-speaking community.
  - In 1950, Ófalu joined Budapest.
- Deportation – 1946:
  - After World War II, German-speaking families were deported, with 575 families (2281 people) being transported to West Germany.
  - After the deportation, the village became depopulated, and new residents moved into the empty houses, mostly from Czechoslovakia and Romania.
- Economic and Social Changes After the Deportation:
  - After the deportation, agriculture ceased to play a significant role, and local industry became dominant.
  - With the arrival of the new residents, the Swabian traditions gradually faded into the background.
- The Socialist Era:
  - Panel buildings began to be constructed between 1975-76, leading to a rapid increase in the population.
  - The village's infrastructure developed, with new schools and transportation options (suburban train, BKV buses).

== Name ==
The first recorded name of the village was Megyer, which refers to the fact that people from the Megyer tribe (who gave their name to Magyars) settled here after the migration of Hungarians into Pannonia in the early 10th century. Megyer belongs to the oldest strata of Hungarian toponymy.

In the second half of the 17th century, Megyer was destroyed by the wars with Ottoman Turks. The village was resettled by German or Swabian colonist from the 1740s onwards. They called the village Krottendorf (literally "Frogbury" or "Frogvillage") because of the frog-populated marshes of the Danube river meadows.

Hungarians called the village Békás-Megyer, meaning "Froggy Megyer", since the beginning of the 19th century. Now District III. is officially called Óbuda-Békásmegyer.

== Population ==
By 1890, Békásmegyer had a population of 1340, 95% of Swabian (German) origin. A steady influx of Magyars resulted in a ten-fold increase in the total population by the World War II, and dilution of the Swabians to less than 25%. In 1946, three-quarters of the Swabians were expropriated and expelled to war-ravaged West Germany. During the 1970s and 1980s, Békásmegyer's population increased rapidly because the construction of the new microdistrict (about from a few thousand to 50,000–55,000).

== See also ==
- Óbuda
- Óbuda-Békásmegyer
