= Herman Ottó Gimnázium =

Coordinates: 48.1°N 20.7833°E

Otto Herman Secondary Grammar School
- Herman Ottó Gimnázium
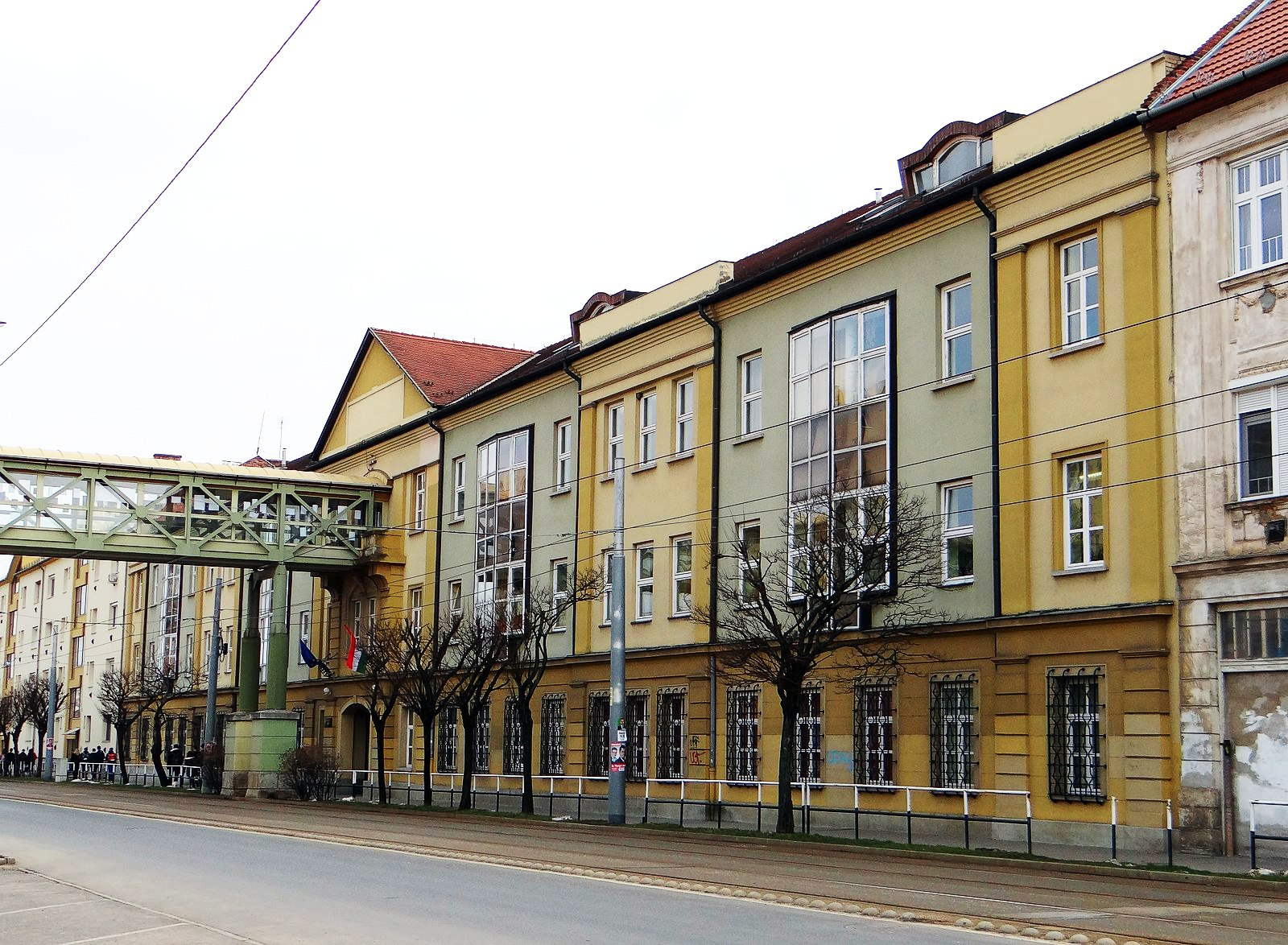
- Otto Herman Secondary School's main building with the bridge that leads to the school's athletic facility

Location
- Tízeshonvéd utca 21. Miskolc, H-3525

Information
- School type: secondary grammar school (gimnázium)
- Religious affiliation: independent
- Established: 1878
- Founder: József Samassa
- Principal: Peter Madarasz
- Gender: coeducation
- Age: 11 to 18
- Enrollment: 900
- Language: Hungarian
- Website: hermangimnazium.hu

Ottó Herman Secondary School (Hungarian: Herman Ottó Gimnázium) is a secondary school in Miskolc, Hungary. The school is famous for being ranked among the best secondary schools in Hungary. In 2018, HVG ranked the school as 12th best in the country outside Budapest, and third best excluding secondary schools located in the capital city of Hungary, Budapest. In 2022, eduline ranked the Herman to be the 30th best high school in Hungary.

== History ==
The school was established 1878 when József Samassa, archbishop of the town Eger mandated to start a school six grades. The land and the building was granted by Bükk Zsigmondné Sebe Terézia. Sisters from the church supported the educational initiatives at the beginning.

In 1957, the school was named after Ottó Herman, a Hungarian zoologist, ethnographer, archeologist and politician.

In 1995, a new athletic center was added to the school, adjacent to the main campus, on the other side of the tram line. This addition made the school capable to support more athletic activities. The two main sections of the school are connected with a bridge over the tram line and main road.

In 1997, the school celebrated its 40th birthday.

In 2013, a new laboratory facility was added in order to support STEM education.

== Gallery ==
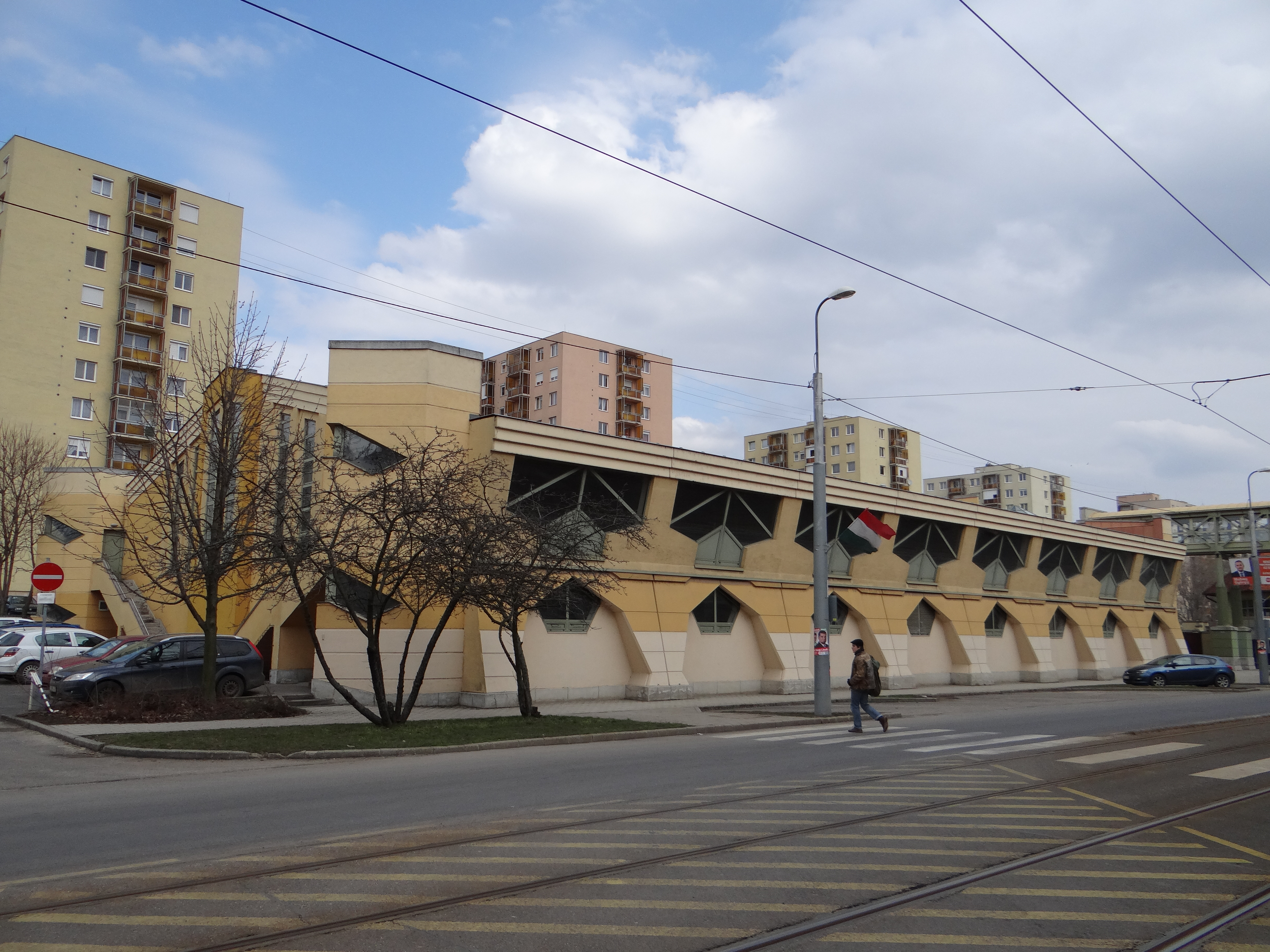
Otto Herman Secondary School's athletic facility

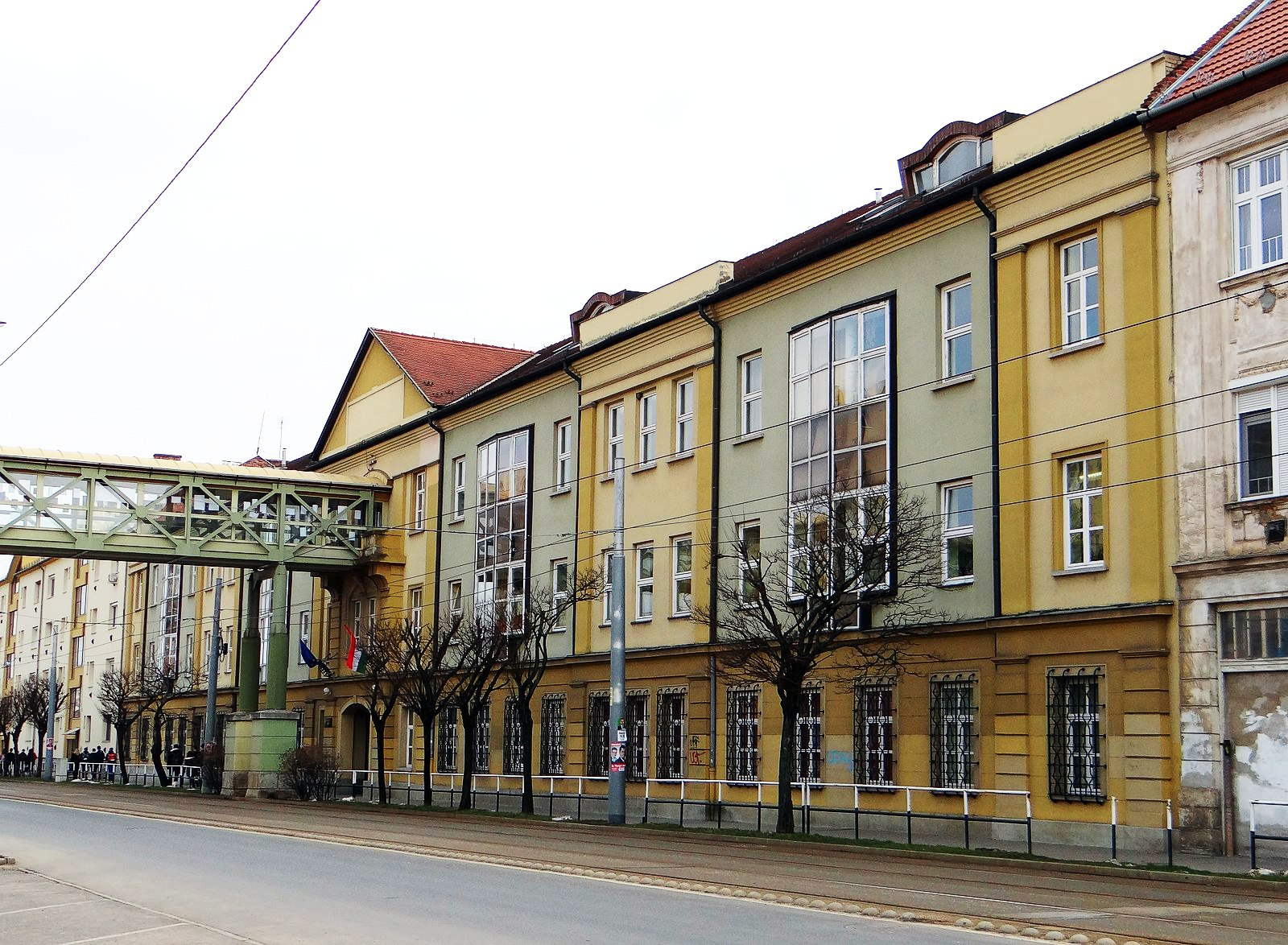
Otto Herman Secondary School's main building with the bridge that leads to the school's athletic facility

== Events and Activities ==
The school annually organizes student mock government elections where students mock school leadership and run for presidency of the school. In 2019, Dwayne Johnson endorsed a group of students in their race to win the school's annual mock student government elections.

The school is famous for releasing music videos for various occasions on YouTube that are performed either by the faculty or students, e.g. celebrating holidays and graduating classes as well as support or protest against current political events.
