= Ambrustanya =

Coordinates: 47°08′N 17°45′E

Ambrustanya is a former village, now a part of Seregélyes, Hungary. The postal code is 8111.

== Geography ==
Ambrustanya's altitude is 122 meters.

It currently has a population of around 0 (in 2001).

It lies approximately 2 km northwest of Seregélyes.
