= Benedictine High School of Pannonhalma =

Coordinates: 47°33′08″N 17°45′41″E

- Hungarian: Pannonhalmi Bencés Gimnázium és Kollégium
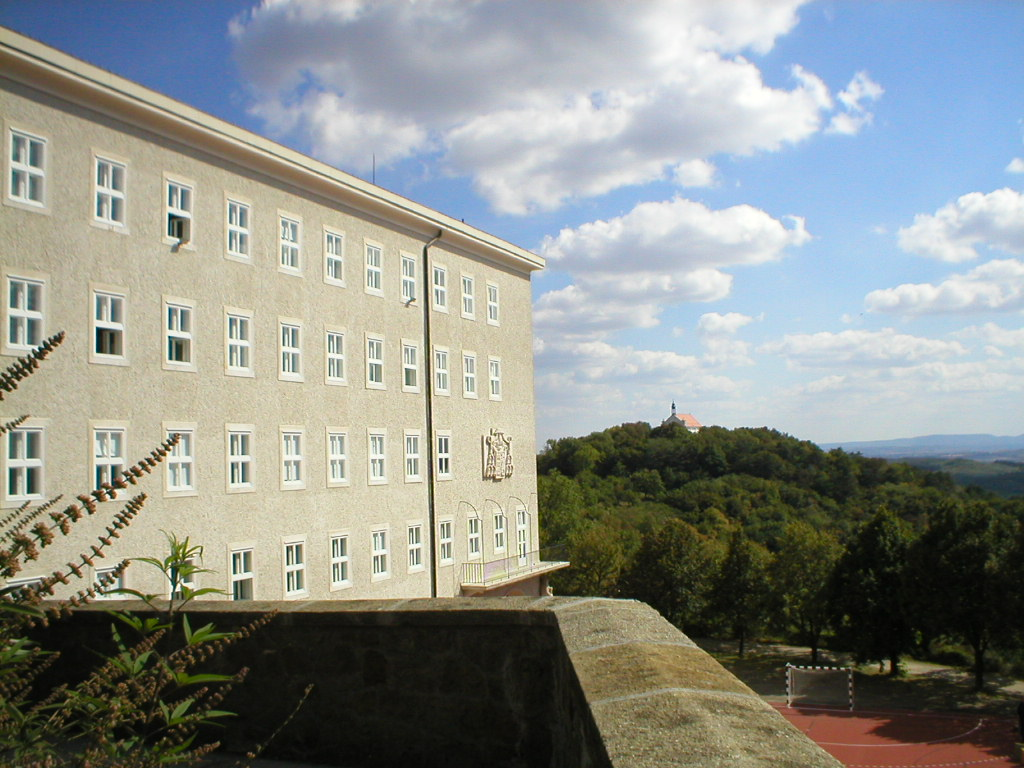
- Pannonhalma, Győr-Moson-Sopron; Hungary

Information
- Type: Independent gimnázium Boarding school
- Religious affiliation: Roman Catholic
- Established: AD 996 (current: 1939)
- Oversight: Pannonhalma Archabbey
- Headmaster: Albin Juhász-Laczik OSB
- Gender: Boys
- Website: phbences.hu

The Benedictine High School of Pannonhalma (Hungarian: Pannonhalmi Bencés Gimnázium és Kollégium) is an independent Roman Catholic boarding school for boys, one of the most distinguished secondary schools in Hungary, led by and situated next to the thousand-year-old Pannonhalma Benedictine Archabbey above Pannonhalma, Győr-Moson-Sopron county. Founded during the late 10th century, it is one of the oldest schools in both Central Europe and the world.

== History ==
Education began soon after the foundation of the abbey in 996, so this date can be regarded as the beginning of school education in Hungary. Education was ended by the Turkish invasion in the middle of the 16th century, but it was started again in 1690, to teach would-be monks beyond high school. The Benedictine order was dissolved in 1786 by Joseph II; however it was re-established in 1802, when the school was also begun again. From 1919, the leadership of the abbey wanted to open a boarding school, and this was established in 1921 with 22 boys. In 1932, however, due to the economic depression, it had to be closed. It re-opened in its present form in 1939 as an "Italian" high school, with emphasis on the Italian language and culture. By this year, it received separate buildings for the education and the dormitories, which are still in use. In 1948 the school was brought under State control and was reopened in 1950. It was among the few Catholic schools which didn't cease functioning, even in the Socialist era, which ended in 1989. The school traditionally attracted scions of the Hungarian noble families (e.g. Cseszneky, Erdődy, Forgách, Zichy). Under the 1995 renovations the high school was completely renewed.

== Today ==
Although it is a prestigious school, usually among the top five of Hungary (cf. Public school (UK)), only a small tuition fee is required, in accordance with one's means. Today there are about 300 students studying here for four or six years (from the age of 12 or 14), until the maturity examination certificate at the age of 18. There are usually two classes in every year, each with 30-40 people.

Students choose between learning German and English, and also between Italian, French, and Latin, and may learn further foreign and ancient languages as well. Specialization is possible from the age of sixteen in any two subjects. Approximately half the schoolteachers are monks, and the other half are laymen and women. There are several study circles available for the students, and they may see movies in the school twice a week (usually an art film on Wednesday and a popular film on Saturday). Students live in dormitories of thirty until the age of sixteen, and in rooms of two or four during their final two years at the school.

== Alumni ==
- Pál Gábor, Hungarian film director
- Balázs Gulyás, Hungarian neurobiologist, university professor (Karolinska Institute Stockholm, Imperial College London, Nanyang Technological University Singapore)
- Imre Gyöngyössy, Hungarian film director, poet
- Otto von Habsburg, Crown Prince of Austria-Hungary, educated by monks from the High School of Pannonhalma
- Marcell Jankovics, Hungarian film director
- Benedek Jávor, Hungarian biologist, politician, member of the European Parliament
- István Kukorelli, Hungarian lawyer, member of constitutional court
- Béla Lipták, Hungarian-American scientist
- Miklós Maróth, Hungarian filologist, orientalist, university professor
- Károly Méhes, Hungarian poet, writer, journalist
- Gáspár Nagy, Hungarian poet, editor
- László Nógrádi, Hungarian politician, minister
- Gergely Olosz, Romanian-Hungarian politician, member of the Romanian parliament
- Gábor Világosi, Hungarian lawyer, politician, vice-speaker of the Hungarian parliament
- Peter Gloviczki, Hungarian-American vascular surgeon, professor at Mayo Clinic
- Péter Járfás, Hungarian airline pilot having flown in Tuzla and Sarajevo, Bosnia, before joining operations in Budapest, Hungary

== See also ==
- List of the oldest schools in the world
- List of notable secondary schools in Hungary
