= Fáy András Economic High School =

Coordinates: 48.085298°N 20.784537°E

- Hungarian: Fáy András Közgazdasági Szakközépiskola
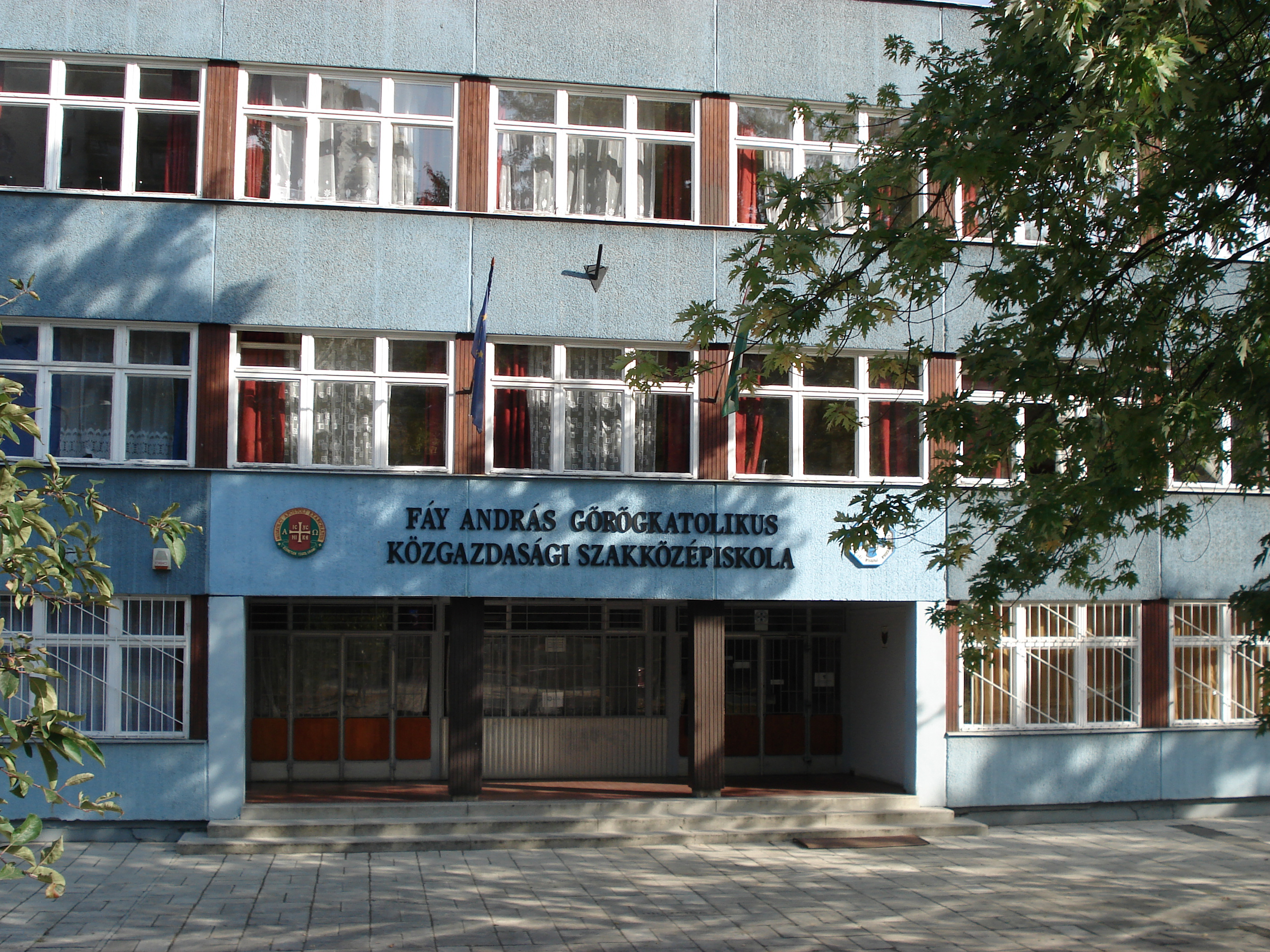

Information
- Established: October 3, 1917; 108 years ago
- Gender: Girls (1917-1964); Mixed (1964-present)
- Language: Hungarian; French; English; German

Fáy András Economic High School (Hungarian: Fáy András Közgazdasági Szakközépiskola) in the city of Miskolc, Hungary, was opened on 3 October 1917 as a girl's economic high school. Since 1964, it has been a co-educational school.

== History ==
Poet and author, András Fáy, founder of the first bank in Hungary, was born in Kohány, Zemplén County. The school adopted his name in 1980. Fáy aimed to improve the educational system; he believed that if Hungarians developed their consciousness, they would develop their nation, and the school's academic form followed his ideal.

The school moved to its present location in 1980.

== Curriculum ==
In the ninth and tenth grades, students may study:

- Behavioural sciences,
- Communication studies,
- Computer technology,
- Typing, and
- Basic economics.

In the 11th grade, students may study: Theoretical economics, Practical economics, and Secretarial studies.

Fáy András high school became a bilingual high school in 2001, when Hungarian–English and Hungarian–French classes started. Starting in the ninth grade, students learn two different languages: English or German. Starting in 11th grade, students attend classes in English, German, or French three times a week.

== Sources ==
- Hegedüs, Géza. A magyar irodalom arcképcsarnoka. Trezor:Budapest, 1992
