= Veres Péter Gimnázium =

Veres Péter Secondary School

Location
- Csobánka tér 7. Budapest, Hungary, 1039; 47°35′49.6024″N 19°3′7.3825″E

Information
- School type: 8-grade secondary grammar school
- Founded: 1986
- School code: 035226
- Headmaster: Andorás Rakovszky
- Teaching staff: 69 people
- Age range: 10-18 years
- Average class size: 31 people
- Website: https://verespg.hu/our-school-in-english

Békásmegyeri Veres Péter Gimnázium (in English: Veres Péter Secondary School of Békásmegyer) is a secondary school in Békásmegyer, in the 3rd District of Budapest. It is currently the 4th best secondary school in Hungary.

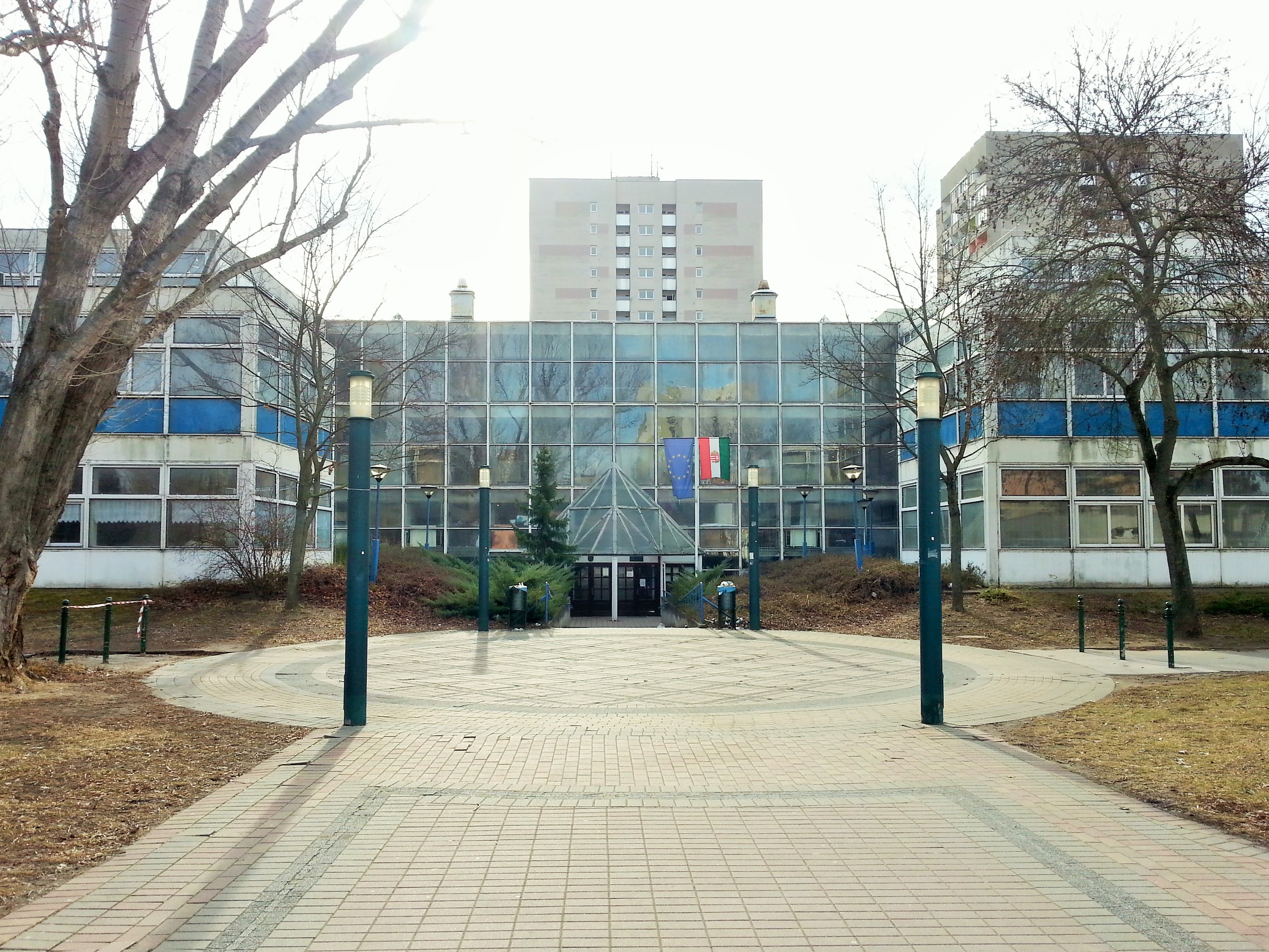
The building of the school

== History ==
The school was founded in 1986 by Budapest 3rd district's executive council. The architect was Gábor Lisztes, and the contractor of the building was Integrál company. Officially the school was working in a four-grade system, but in 1991 the 8-grade education was integrated to the school's structure.

=== Origin of the appellation ===
The school is named after Péter Veres, a Hungarian writer, politician and peasant farmer. The life of peasants and unfairnesses of society are emphatic in his writings.

=== Headmasters of the school ===
- István Tiszavölgyi (1986–1998)
- Mihályné Rácz (1998–2003)
- György Papp (2003–2018)
- György Székely (2018–2024)
- Andorás Rakovszky (2024-)

== Foundation ==
The school has its own foundation, where you can make contributions for the school.

The school owns a plot near Boldogkőváralja, where the school's summer camps are usually held. The house on the plot is being renovated by the students and alumni during their stay in the craftsman summer camps.

== Education ==
At the Veres Péter Secondary School in Békásmegyer, two classes of 32-34 students start their studies each year in the eight-grade training, while in the case of the four-grade training, a class of 30 students starts their studies.

=== Eight-grade high school education ===
The eight-year high school education of Veres Péter Secondary School provides students with a high-quality educational opportunity that combines science-based studies and artistic and creative training. The school starts two classes with a general curriculum: in class "a", they can choose German or English as their first foreign language, while in class "b" they will learn English. Art subjects play a key role in education, so students learn solfeggio, flute and Latin, while they also provide a wide range of opportunities in the field of arts (singing, music, folk dance). During the training, great emphasis is placed on the differentiated teaching of subjects, so students study different subjects in divided groups, for example, in the case of foreign languages, digital culture, technology-lifestyle, flute, mathematics, and natural science subjects (biology, chemistry, physics).

In addition to everyday physical education, the weekly breakdown of lessons also includes special subjects, such as solfege and flute for two grades, and Latin language and cultural history for two years. The institution announces entry exam for fourth-graders every year. The admission procedure has strict requirements. Applications are made with an application form submitted to the high school, and the written entrance exam takes place in Hungarian laungage and literature and mathematics subjects. After the written exam, the students with the best results can take an oral exam. The admission results are determined on the basis of the results of the central written exam, the scores obtained and the oral exam.

=== Laungages ===
In the 5th grade, the school has three groups studying English (16 students each) and one German language group (also 16 students) starting each year. In the four-year programme (classes C), students can choose German or English as their first foreign language. In class 9.C, depending on the number of applicants, the first foreign language is taught in three groups. The majority of students take the C1 exam in the first foreign language.

Second foreign language from the 9th grade onwards students must study compulsory for four years. The training takes place for three hours a week, and later six hours, which provides the opportunity for students to successfully pass the B2 language exam.

The school pays special attention to the development of language skills, which is why a foreign language poetry and prose recitation competition is also held every year, where they are given the opportunity to show their knowledge. This competition is not only fun, but also motivates students to learn the language and practice correct pronunciation.

=== Choosable secondary laungage ===
1. English
2. German
3. Italian
4. French
5. Spanish
6. Russian
7. Latin and Japanese
  - These two laungages are only optional, they can't be chosen as a second laungage, only as a faculty

=== Religious Education ===
1. Buddhism
2. Calvinism/ Reformed Christianity
3. Roman Catholic Religion
4. Morals and Ethics

=== Mathematics ===
This school has high-level mathematical education, alongside Physics lessons.

=== Preparing for the baccalaureate ===
At school, the preparations for the school-leaving exams begin in the previous years, with students having to take exams in grades 6, 8, 9, 10 and 11. These exams are taken in mathematics, Hungarian language, English, history, geography and chemistry and are graded according to the percentage evaluation of the intermediate level baccalaureate exam.

=== Faculties ===
At the school, facultative classes help students prepare for the advanced level school-leaving exams. Elective subjects at the end of grade 10 give students the opportunity to learn what they want and what they are interested in. Faculties are designed to deepen knowledge, prepare for exams, and strengthen future fields of study.

The school also provides preparation for the advanced level school-leaving examination in a foreign language within the framework of study groups.

==== Facultative options ====
- Chemistry
- IT
- Geography
- History
- Hungarian Laungage and Literature
- Mathematics
- Physical Education
- Physics
- Visual Culture

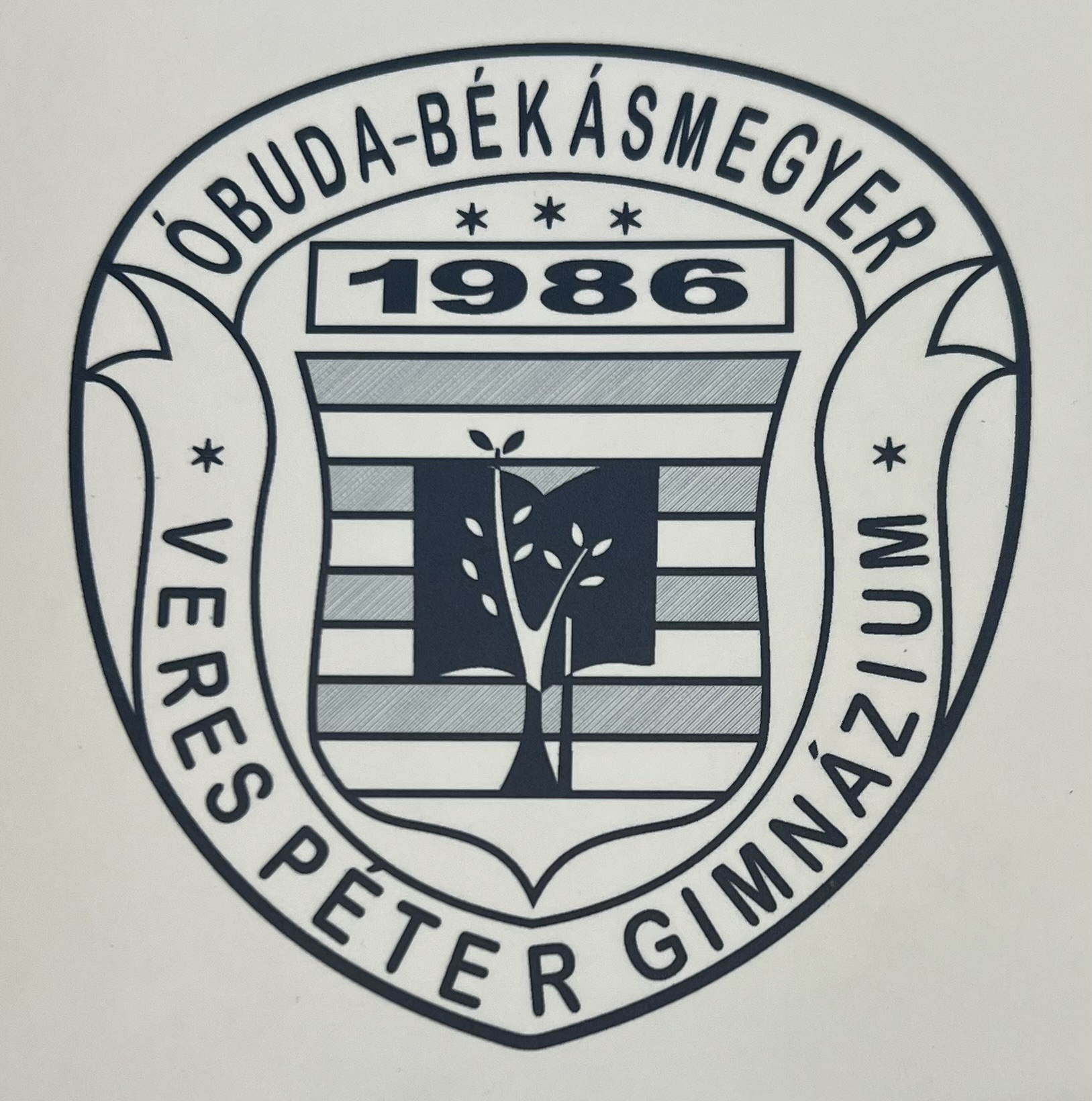
Crest (2025)

=== Study groups ===
The school's study groups can be chosen from the 7th grade. They provide students with an opportunity to broaden their knowledge and interests. They not only serve to deepen subject knowledge, but also help to create a great community where students work together with peers with similar interests. In addition to the traditional subject courses, the school also offers more special extra classes such as choir, linguistics, astronomy, Latin and mythology.

- Astronomy
- Biology
- Chemistry
- Choir
- IT
- English
- German
- History
- Hungarian
- Latin
- Linguistics
- Mathematics
- Mythology
- Physics

== Education of art ==
Since the foundation of the Veres Péter High School, art education and the cultivation of folk dance traditions have played an important role. Within the framework of this program, four hundred students get acquainted with the music and dance material of the people of the Carpathian Basin, which is part of the national culture. In the eight-grade training, the 5th and 6th grades are obliged to learn folk dance for two hours a week. Grades 7 and 8 can continue their studies of folk dance as an optional subject for one hour a week, but they can also choose instruments (zither, brass and woodwinds) and the choir. Students in grades 9-12 can continue the art circles within the framework of study groups. In the four-year training, the 9th grade is obliged to dance for one hour a week for one year, after which it is possible to join the 10th-12th grade study groups, which are provided by the school.

Between 1994 and 1996, the school folk dance galas are held annually, and since 1997 every two years, where all the dancers of VPG and some members of the SZKE (Széll Cultural Association) perform. The productions are accompanied by the Téka Ensemble.

The first principal of the school, István Tiszavölgyi, also placed great emphasis on musical activities. In the eight-grade training, students in grades 5-6 are required to participate in one solfége and two flute lessons per week. The aim of the school is to provide students with the widest possible perspective and to gain insight into the world of instruments. Music plays a key role in the life of the school. Every year, the music competition is held, where hundreds of students show their knowledge.

Since 2008, it has been a tradition in December every day until the 24th of December that the students make music performances on the school stage. Since 2014, the most talented students have introduced themselves at the New Year's concert.

Every two years, a two-act music gala is held, where students studying instruments and members of the choir perform.

== Sports ==
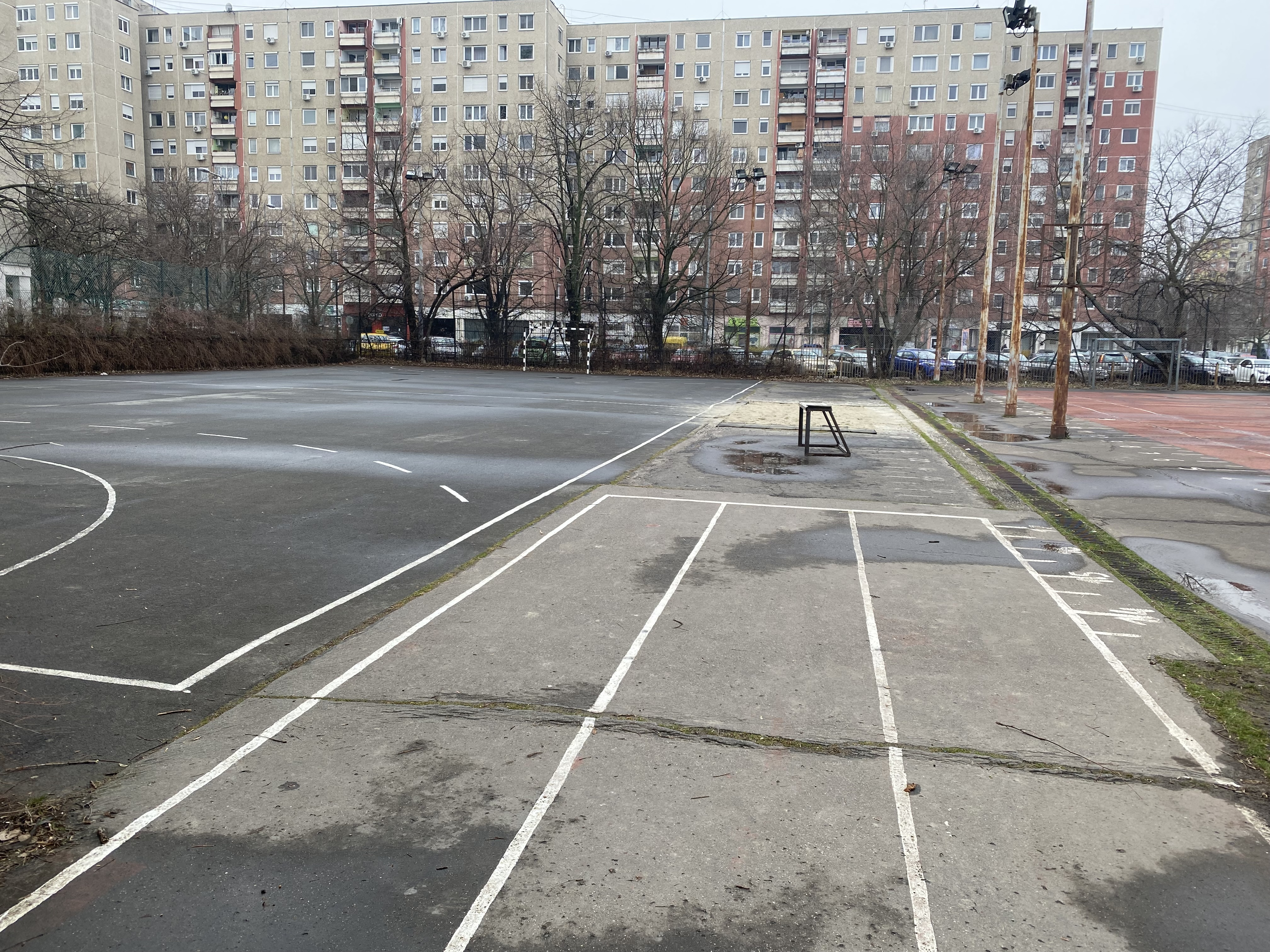
Soccer field

At the school, various sports play an important role. In addition to the three mandatory physical education classes per week, students can join the following sports as afternoon extracurricular activities:

- Volleyball
- Physical training
- Therapeutic Physical Education (only for those who medically require it)
- Folk dance

From seventh grade onwards, students must complete two additional sports sessions besides the three mandatory physical education classes. These can be verified through an external sports club or within the school. Students who participate in external sports clubs must provide proof from the club at the beginning of the school year. Within the school, students can choose from the sports listed above.

Fifth and sixth graders have two folk dance classes in addition to the three physical education classes. As part of their physical education, fifth graders take swimming lessons, while sixth graders learn judo in a double lesson.

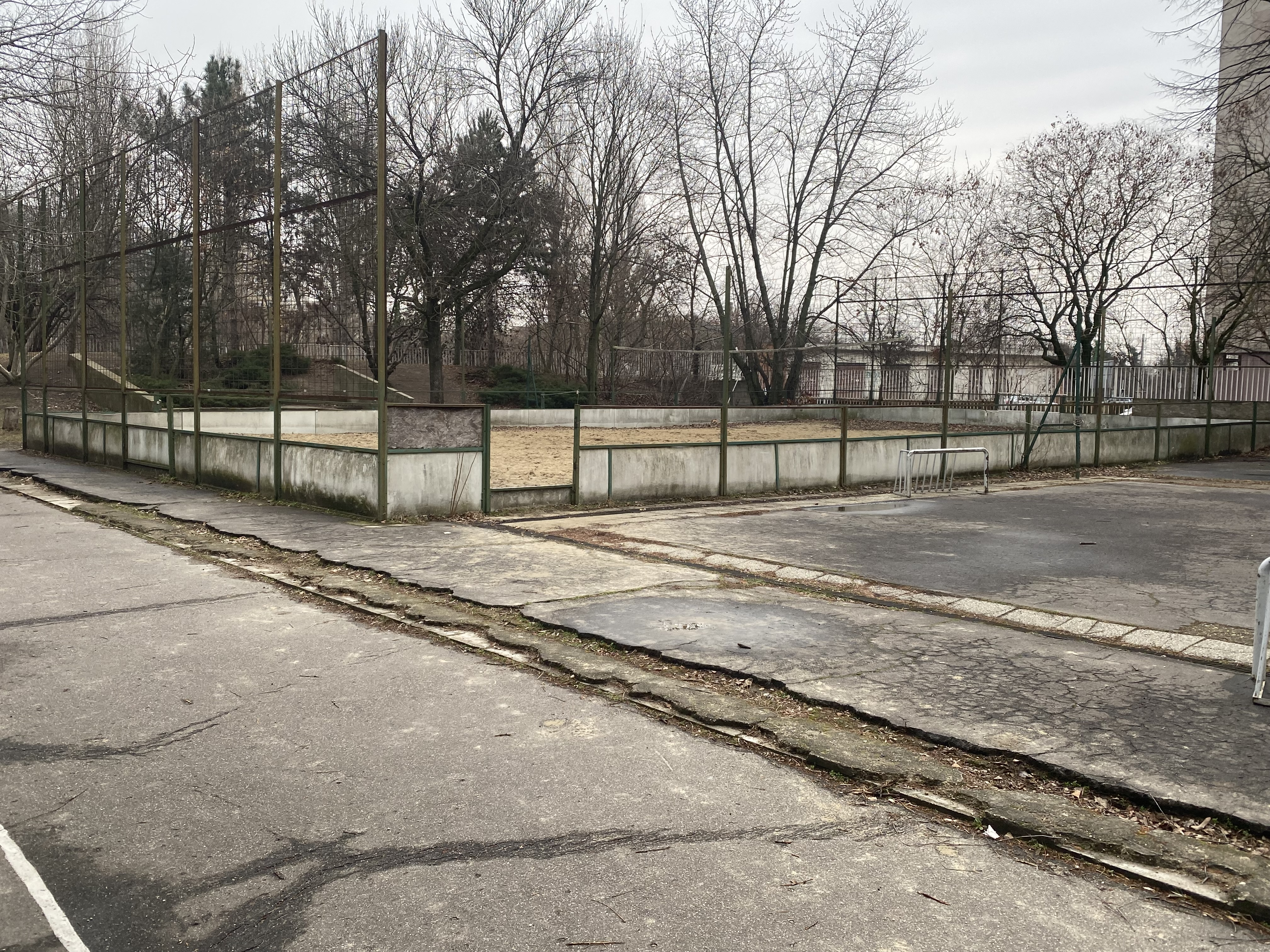
Outdoor volleyball court

=== Volleyball ===
Volleyball receives special attention in the high school. The markings in the gymnasium are suitable for a volleyball court. The school's volleyball team has repeatedly reached national finals and achieved excellent results. Volleyball is a great opportunity for students to get to know each other and themselves, have fun, and maintain a healthy lifestyle.

== Sister Schools ==
The high school has two sister schools in Germany: Merz Schule and Gymnasium bei St. Michael Schwäbisch Hall.

=== Merz Schule ===
Merz Schule is a private, state-recognized school that includes a high school, boarding school, elementary school, daycare, kindergarten, and nursery. It is located in Stuttgart, in the Geroksruhe area, and was one of the first schools in the Federal Republic of Germany.

=== Gymnasium bei St. Michael Schwäbisch Hall ===
St. Michael Gymnasium in Schwäbisch Hall is a general education high school maintained by the major district town of Schwäbisch Hall. It is named after Saint Michael, who is depicted as a dragon slayer in the "Satan-defeating" statue standing at the western entrance.

== Approach ==
The school can be easily approached by many means of transportation.

=== By HÉV (suburban railway) ===
In the neighbourhood of the high school, there is the Békásmegyer stop of the H5 (Szentendre-Battyány-tér) suburban railway. From here, Csobánka Square is about a 5-minute walk away. The suburban railway lines run between the downtown of Budapest (Batthyány Square) and the Szentendre area, thus ensuring a quick and convenient access to the school.

=== By buses ===
In the area of the high school, there are several BKK bus lines, which stop near the school. The following buses can get you to the school:

- Bus 34
- Bus 134
- Bus 143
- Bus 160
- Bus 204
- Bus 243
- Bus 296
- Bus 923
- Bus 934
- Bus 943
- Bus 960

=== By car ===
Free parking is provided in the area of the high school, but the number of free parking spaces is limited during the morning and afternoon peak periods, so it is advisable to arrive earlier. However, there are plenty of parking spaces around the school.

=== By other means of transportation ===
The school is also easily accessible on foot. Wide sidewalks and green areas are favorable for pedestrians. Bicycle paths lead to the school, where there is also a bicycle and scooter storage.

== National Ranking ==
HVG National Secondary School Academic Ranking
	2014	2015	2016	2017	2018	2019	2020	2021	2022	2023	2024	2025
HVG	8	3	8	13	-	10	7	6	6	12	4	4

== Famous students ==
- Dé:Nash (2011–2015)
- Krúbi (2005–2013)
- Pusztai Tamás (Nessaj) (2002–2010)
- Dániel Gyurta (2004–2008)
- Ákos Takács (1998–2006)
- Anna Donáth (1997–2005)
- Alexandra Pintácsi (Szandi)
- Tímea Szabó (1990–1994)
- Kata Janza (1986–1990)
