= Bornemisza Péter Gymnasium =

Secondary school in Budapest

Coordinates: 47.4676054°N 19.1239284°E

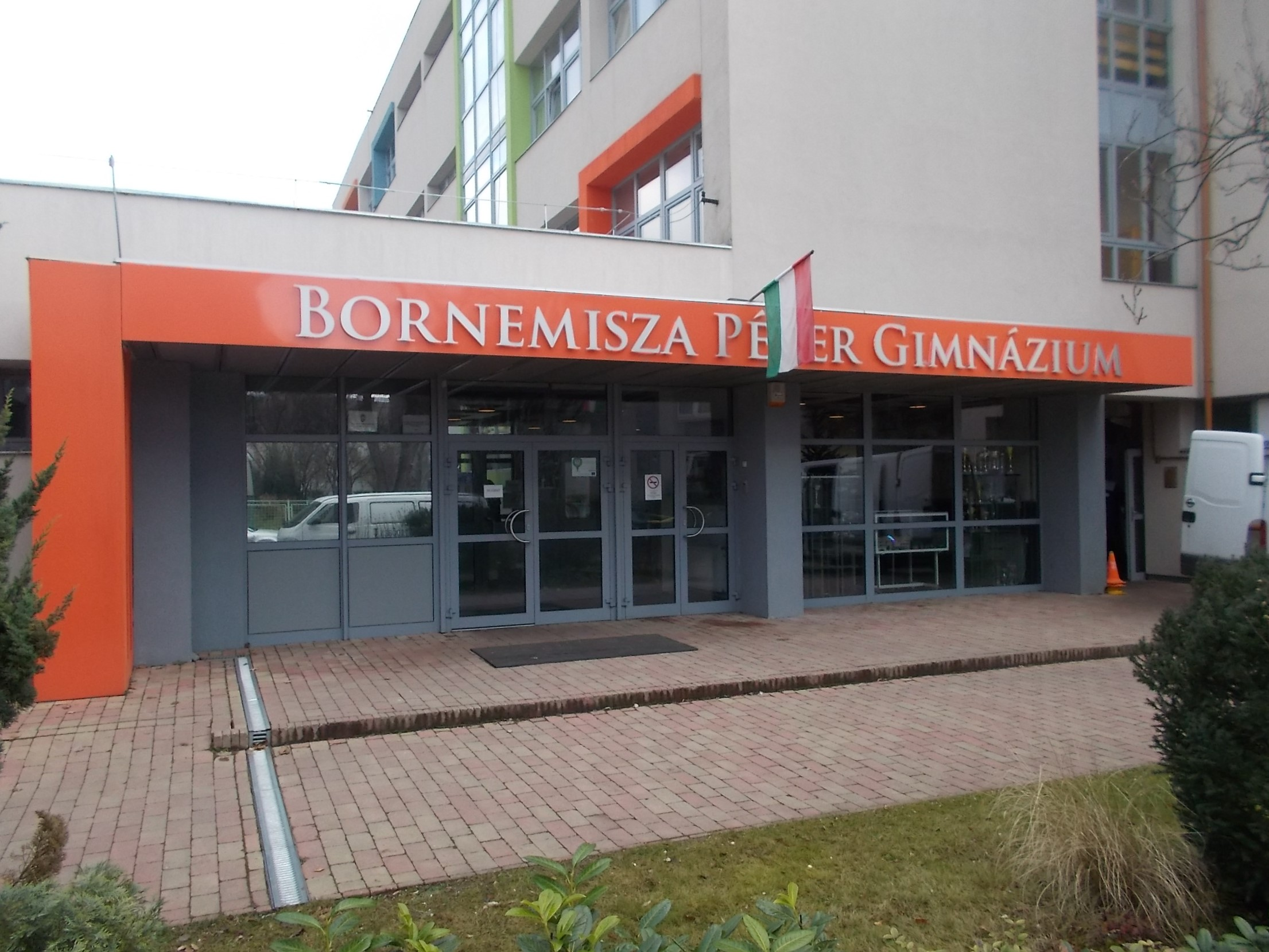
- Budapest; Hungary

Information
- School type: Gymnasium
- Established: 1997
- Enrolment: 1,500
- Website: www.bpg.hu

The Bornemisza Péter Gymnasium (Hungarian: Bornemissza Péter Gimnázium) is a secondary school located in Budapest. The school bears the name of the Hungarian bard Péter Bornemissza.

== History ==
The school was founded in 1997 by Sándor Németh, the Faith Church's main pastor. The Faith Church maintain the school from the beginnings. The institution's first building was the Soviet Army headquarters school. It was furbished in one and half month. In September the teaching started with 350 students. Now it has three more buildings, and about 1,500 students. In the genetar school there are five classes in every year.

== Departments ==
=== Elementary school ===
1-8 levels (Building in Újszász street: a, b, c and d classes each year; building in Száva street three classes each year)

The school has the following sections:

- Art
- Music (piano, clarinet, flute, violin)
- Sports

=== High school ===
The students can choose the language class when they occur to the high school. It means one plus year when the students have extra lessons in English.

=== Sports class ===
From 2010 students in year 1. and 5., and from 2011 also in year 9. can choose to go to sports classes. It is very successful, especially in gymnastics.
