= Seregélyes =

- Large village
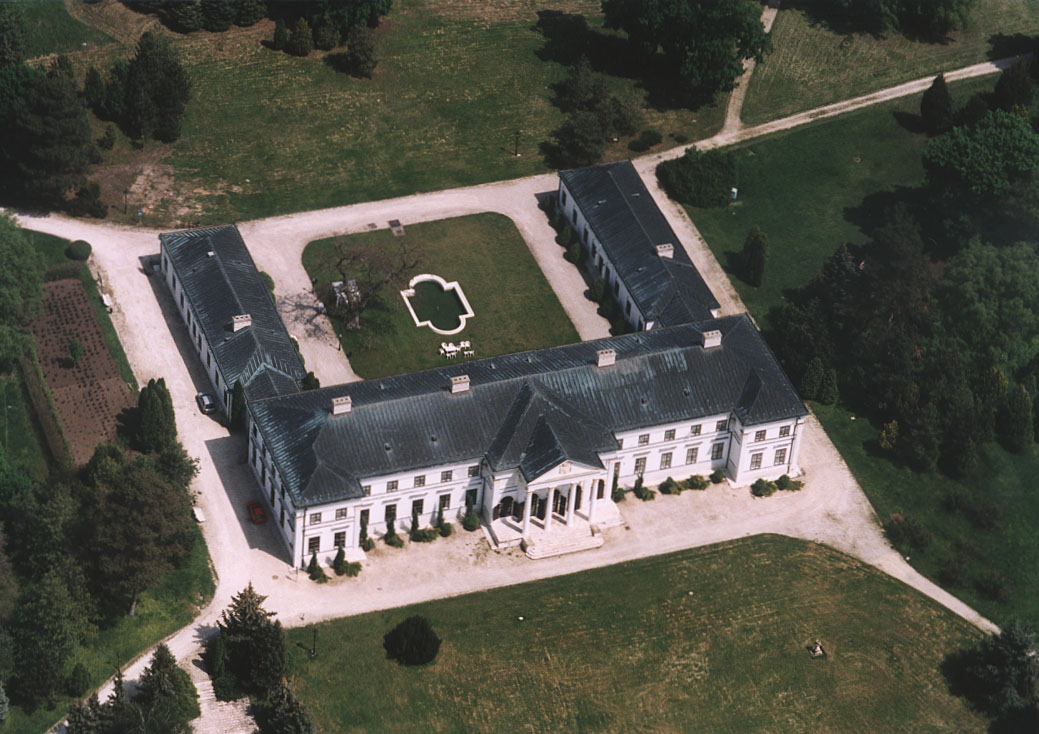
- Aerial photography of Zichy palace

- Flag Coat of arms

- Location of Fejér county in Hungary

- Location of Seregélyes
- Coordinates: 47.11092°N 18.57731°E
- Country: Hungary
- County: Fejér
- District: Székesfehérvár

Area
  - Total: 78.19 km^{2} (30.19 sq mi)

Population (2004)
  - Total: 4,716
  - Density: 60.31/km^{2} (156.2/sq mi)
- Time zone: UTC+1 (CET)
  - Summer (DST): UTC+2 (CEST)
- Postal code: 8111
- Area code: (+36) 22

Seregélyes is a large village in Fejér county, Hungary.

== Education ==
- Fejér Megyei Eötvös József Szakképző Iskola és Kollégium

== Localities ==
- Ambrustanya, a former village
