= International School of Budapest =

- Budapesti Nemzetközi Iskola
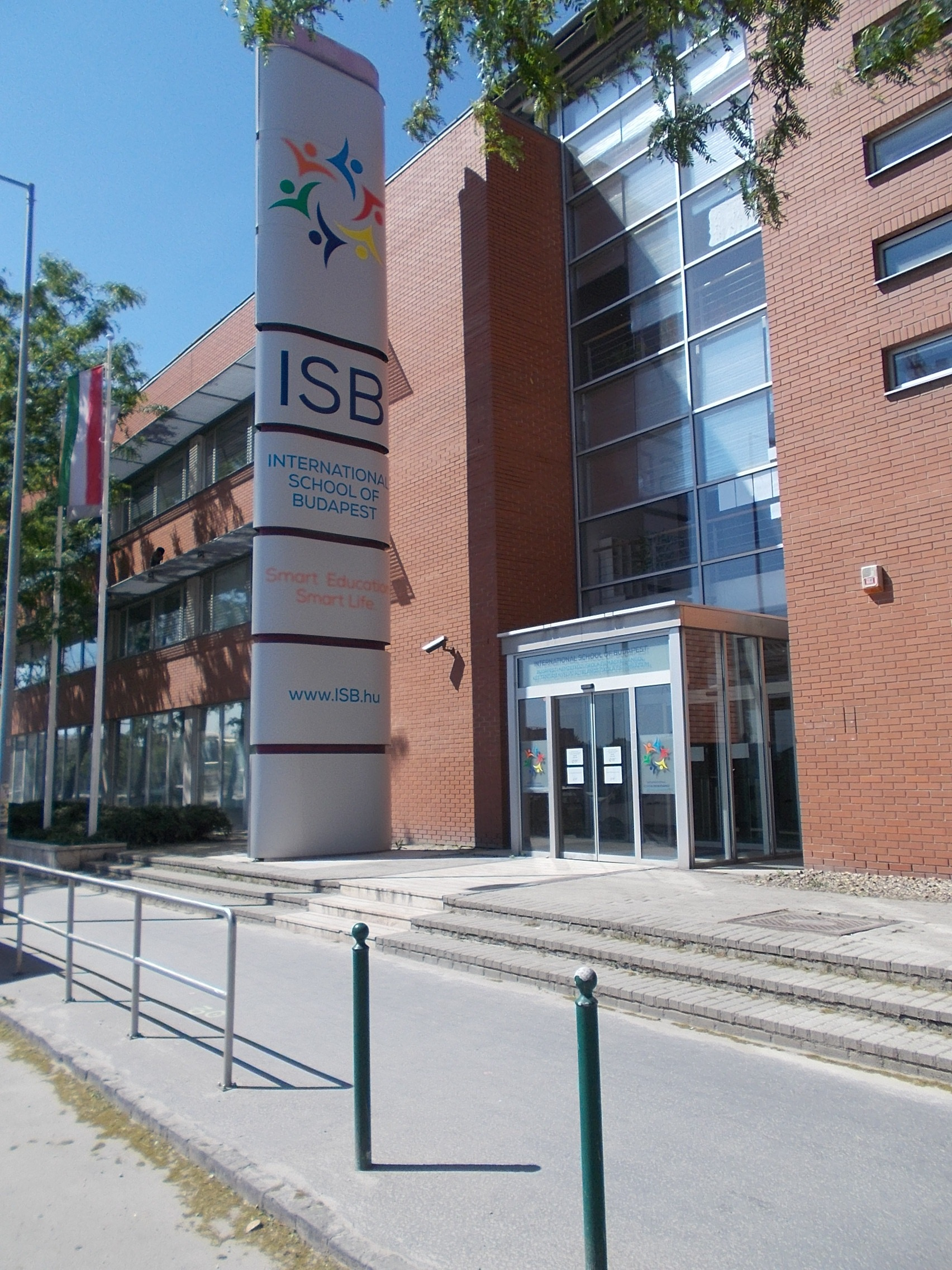
- Main entrance

Location
- 47.4667°N 19.0527°E

Information
- Established: 1996
- Founder: International School of Budapest Foundation
- Principal: Karin Wouters
- Key people: Tibor Hornyák and Zoltán Balog

The International School of Budapest (abbreviated ISB, Hungarian: Budapesti Nemzetközi Iskola) is an international school, currently located in District XI of Budapest, Hungary. It is the third most expensive private school in Budapest. Established in 1997, the school follows the British National Curriculum and offers both Hungarian-English bilingual and British English-language educational programs. It is maintained by the International Education Centre Foundation, a division of the Erzsébet Foundation.

Until 2023, the school was located in Csillebérc, in Budapest's District XII (Hegyvidék), one of the city's most affluent and prestigious residential areas. During this period, the school attracted children from prominent and affluent families in Hegyvidék and elsewhere in Budapest and was regarded as a school serving a socially and economically elite segment of the city's population.

The school was founded in 1997 with the aim of establishing an international private school in Hungary that would not be owned by the embassy of another country, but instead operated by a Hungarian foundation.

Around 2002, the school moved to the site of the former Csillebérc Pioneer Camp, initially leasing the premises from the original owner. In 2020, the Erzsébet Foundation (Erzsébet Alapítvány) acquired the school, the foundation operating it, and the entire campus, including the property on which the school is located. The foundation was led by Zoltán Balog, a former Hungarian government minister who served during the Fidesz-led governments under Viktor Orbán, and Tibor Hornyák, who serves as the foundation's president.

In 2023, the school relocated to District XI. Around the time of the relocation, Nakama & Partners Kft. acquired a 57% stake in the school after moving to Újbuda. The school has also been associated with prominent Hungarian public figures, including Cecília Rogán, Vivien Vasvári and Ildikó Tóth, who enrolled their children there.

Former main building in Csillebérc

Since 2025, the school has been led by Karin Wouters as head of school. In 2023, ISB relocated to a new campus in District XI, provided by the IT Campus, which includes modern facilities such as a gymnasium, café, and restaurant. The campus is shared with János Kodolányi University. As of 2025, the International School of Budapest ranks as the third most expensive private school in Hungary, following the American International School of Budapest and the British International School Budapest.

== Curriculum ==
Early childhood education at the school is based on the standards of Hungarian state kindergartens. From Grade 1 to Grade 8, students follow either a bilingual Hungarian-British English program or a British English-only program, with the latter being the preferred option.

In the upper secondary school, students are prepared for the International General Certificate of Secondary Education (IGCSE) examinations. Since 2020, the school has also offered the International Baccalaureate (IB) Diploma Programme, as well as the IB Certificate Programme for students not enrolled in the full diploma track.
