= József Samassa =

Hungarian Roman Catholic cardinal

His Eminence József Samassa
- Archbishop of Eger
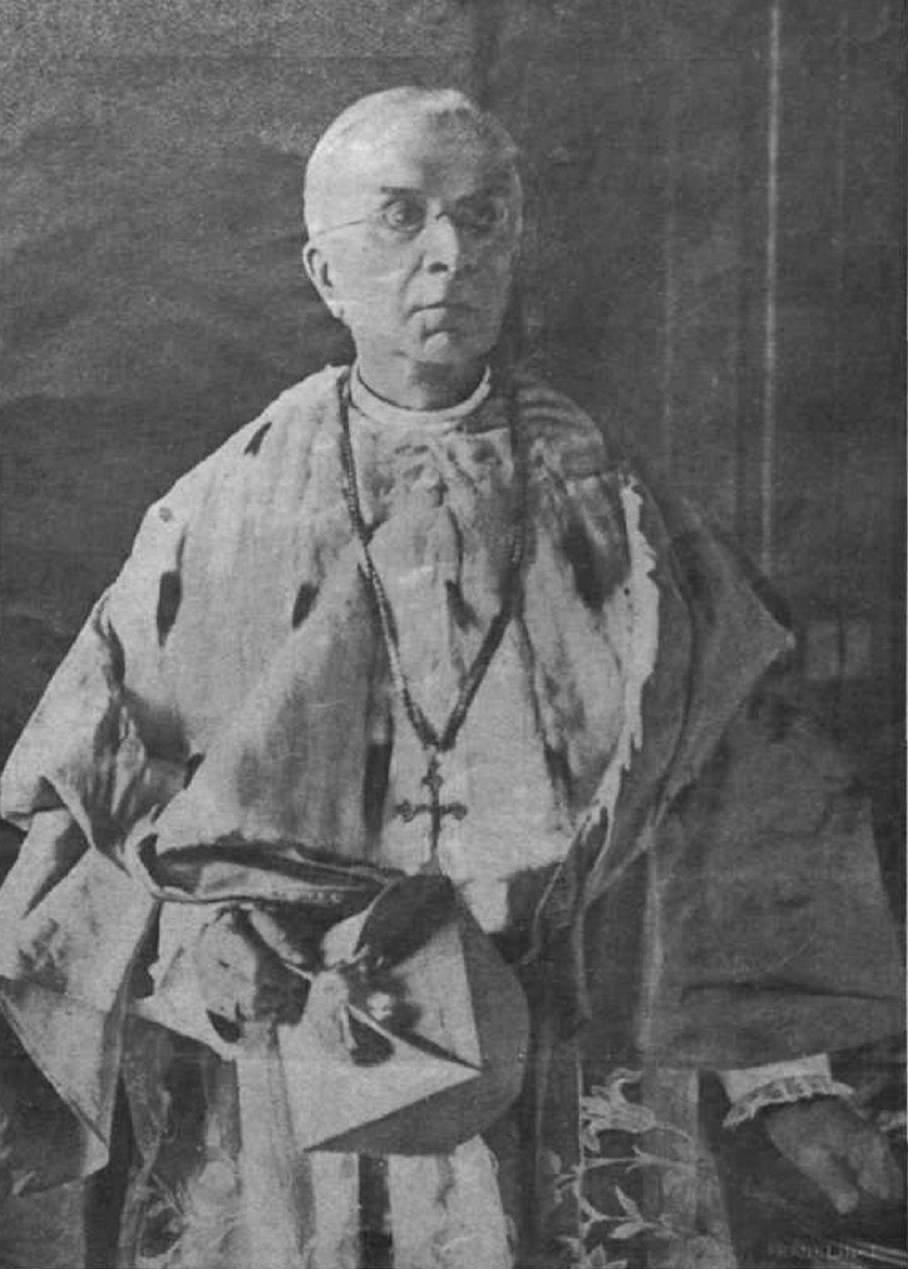
- Samassa in 1912.
- Church: Roman Catholic Church
- Appointed: 25 July 1873
- Term ended: 20 August 1912
- Predecessor: Béla Bartakovics
- Successor: Lajos Szmrecsányi
- Other post: Cardinal-Priest of San Marco (1906-12)
- Previous post: Bishop of Szepes (1871-73)

Orders
- Ordination: 23 July 1852 by János Scitovszky
- Consecration: 30 July 1871 by János Simor
- Created cardinal: 11 December 1905 by Pope Pius X
- Rank: Cardinal-Priest

Personal details
- Born: József Samassa; 30 September 1828 Aranyosmarót, Kingdom of Hungary (today Zlaté Moravce, Slovakia)
- Died: 20 August 1912 (aged 83) Eger, Austria-Hungary
- Education: University of Vienna
- Motto: Fructus honoris onus
- Coat of arms

József Samassa (30 September 1828 – 20 August 1912) was a Hungarian Roman Catholic cardinal who served as the Archbishop of Eger from 1873 until his death. He served as a professor after his ordination and later served as Bishop of Szepes (Spiš), before he was elevated to the Archbishopric of Eger. Pope Pius X named him a cardinal in 1905 as the Cardinal-Priest of San Marco; he received that title twelve months later.

== Life ==
József Samassa was born in Aranyosmarót, Kingdom of Hungary (present-day Zlaté Moravce in Slovakia) on 30 September 1828. He received the sacrament of Confirmation on 23 May 1836. He did his studies for the priesthood first in Pressburg (today Bratislava, Slovakia) and then in the Pázmáneum College in Vienna; he also studied at the college in Vienna, where he obtained his doctorate in theology on 13 June 1862.

Samassa received the insignias of the clerical state (e.g. the cassock) as well as the minor orders in 1856 and was later made a subdeacon on 20 July 1852. He was made a deacon on 22 July before being ordained as a priest in Esztergom on 23 July. Following his ordination, he served as a teacher from 1852 to 1855 and then taught theology at the seminary in Esztergom from 1859 to 1861. He was also the canon for the Esztergom Cathedral from 1870 to 1871.

Pope Pius IX named him the Bishop of Szepes on 26 June 1871 and received the pallium that same day. He was formally installed in his see on 27 August, after having received his episcopal consecration in Esztergom on 30 July. The pope later transferred Samassa to the Archdiocese of Eger as its archbishop on 25 July 1873 and then Pope Leo XIII named him as an Assistant at the Pontifical Throne on 30 July 1886. Samassa received the Grand Cross of the Austrian Order of Sankt Stefan in 1892.

Pope Pius X named Samassa as a cardinal on 11 December 1905 and he was titled as the Cardinal-Priest of San Marco twelve months later on 6 December 1906. He began suffering from pneumonia in May 1912, and died that 20 August due to his deteriorating condition. His remains are housed in the Eger Cathedral.
