= Fejér Megyei Eötvös József Szakképző Iskola és Kollégium =

Fejér County József Eötvös Secondary School and Dorm
- Fejér Megyei Eötvös József Szakképző Iskola és Kollégium

Location
- Fő út 278. Seregélyes, Fejér County; Hungary
- Coordinates: 47.1015°N 18.5893°E

Information
- Type: secondary school
- Motto: One school where you worth to study. (Egy iskola, ahol érdemes tanulni.)
- Established: September 1, 1958
- Founder: 1958
- Headmaster: Zoltán Butola
- Website: www.seregszaksuli.hu
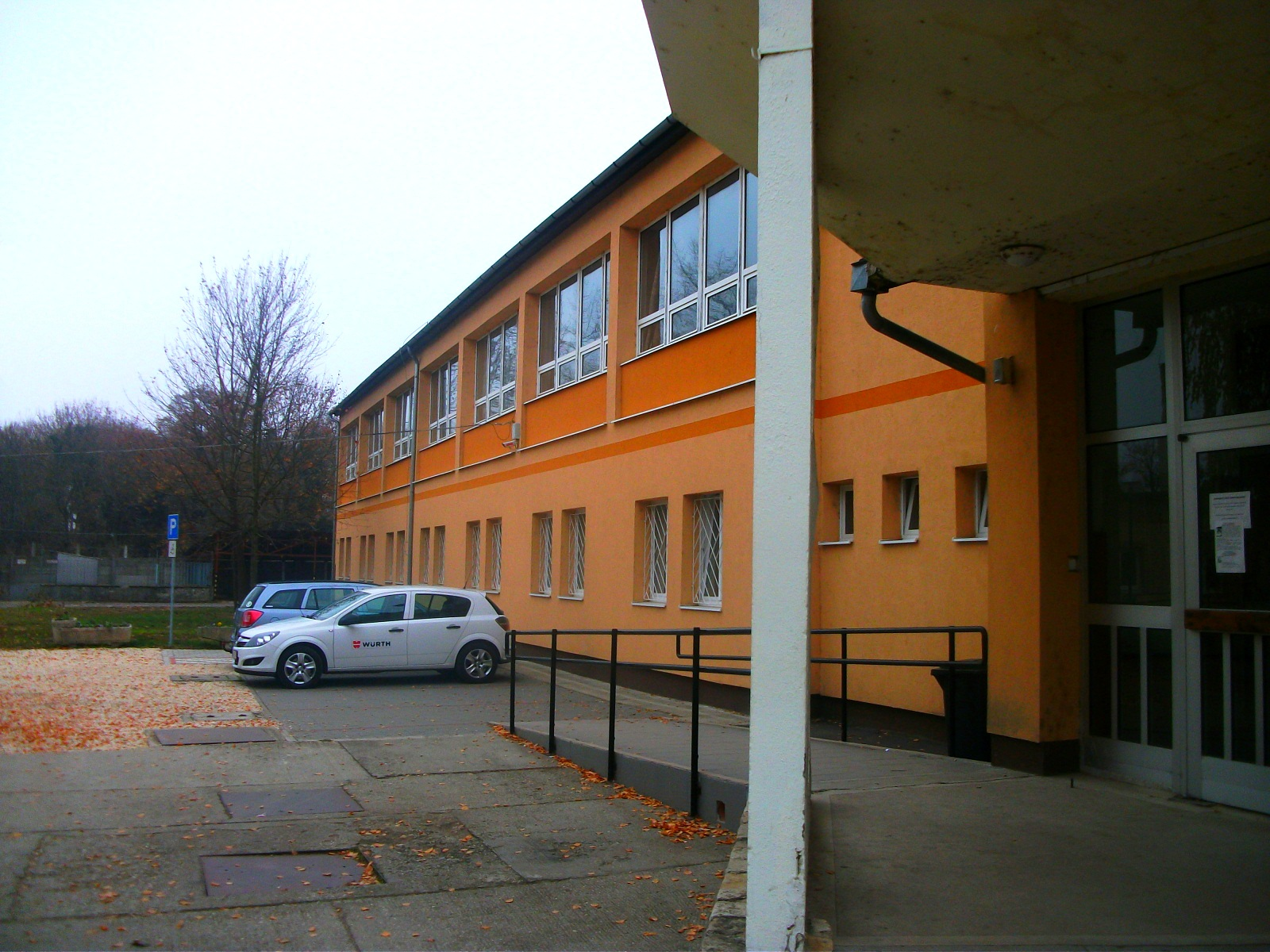
- The school

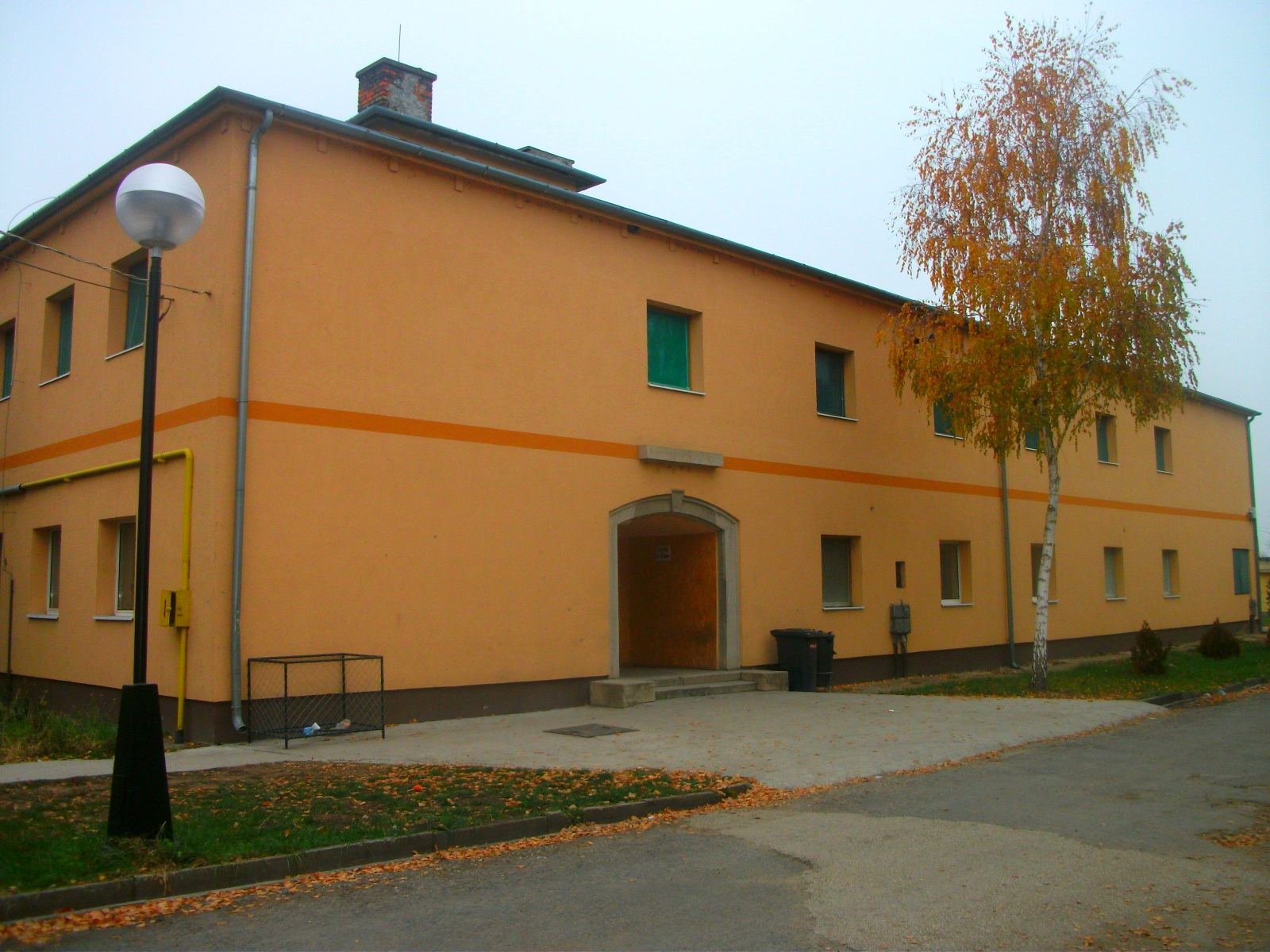
- The school

The Fejér Megyei Eötvös József Szakképző Iskola és Kollégium (English: Fejér County József Eötvös Secondary School and Dorm) is a secondary school in Seregélyes, Hungary.
