= Veres Pálné Gymnasium =

Coordinates: 47.4889°N 19.0584°E

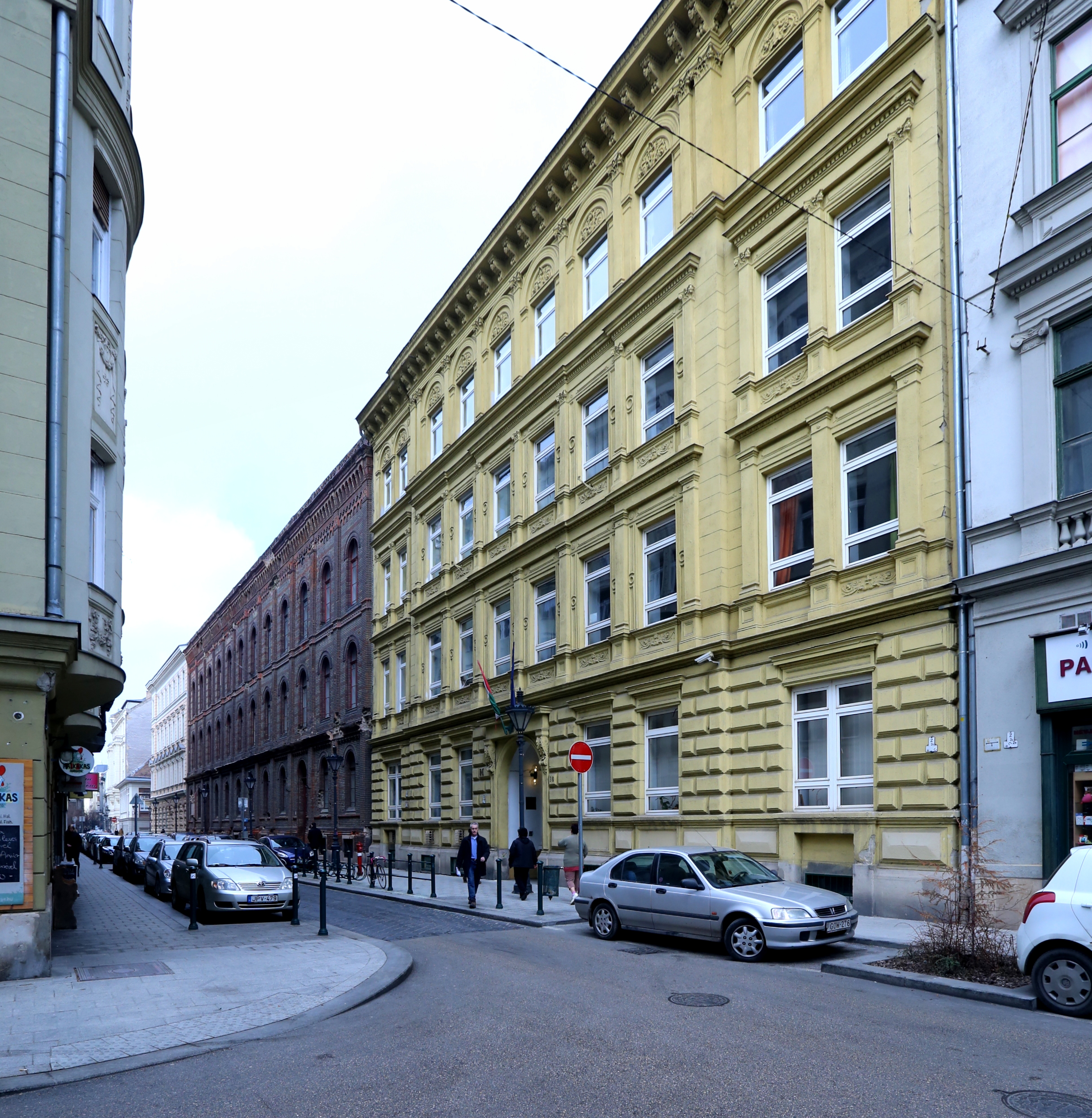
- Veres Pálné Gymnasium

Location
- Veres Pálné utca 38. Budapest; Hungary

Information
- Type: Gymnasium
- Established: 1869; 157 years ago
- Founder: Pálné Veres
- Gender: Mixed
- Age range: 12–18
- Capacity: ca. 500-600
- Website: www.vpg.hu

Veres Pálné Gymnasium (Hungarian: Veres Pálné Gimnázium, VPG) is a Hungarian public gymnasium based in Budapest. The school was founded by Pálné Veres in 1869 and it became the first institution in Hungary to admit women. Throughout the years the school has been considered one of the strongest secondary schools in Hungary. Its library boasts more than 30,000 books, many of which have significant historical importance.
