= Fényi Gyula Jesuit High School =

- Fényi Gyula Jezsuita Gimnázium

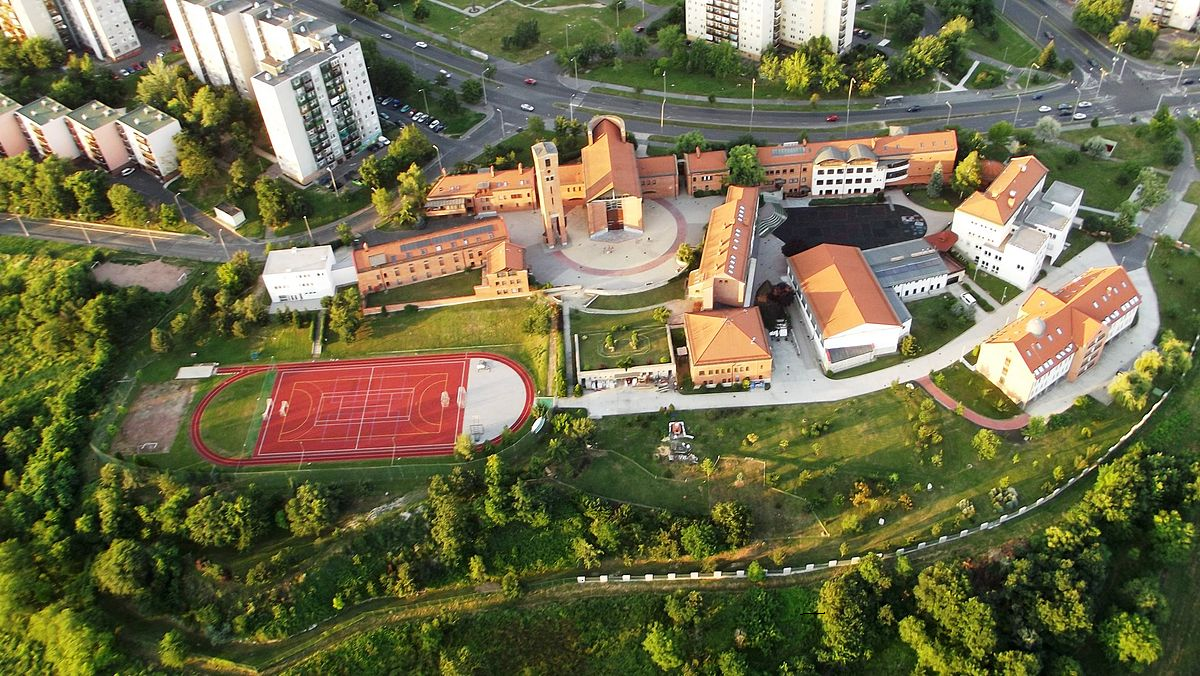

Location
- Fényi square, Miskolc, Hungary
- Coordinates: 48.084284°N 20.775288°E

Information
- Type: Jesuit, Roman Catholic
- Motto: Ad Majora Natus Sum (Born for greater things)
- Established: 1994; 32 years ago
- Authority: Hungarian Government
- CEEB code: 038090
- Rector: Rev. Attila András, SJ
- Director: Rev. Ferenc Holczinger, SJ
- Chaplain: Rev. Zoltán Koronkai, SJ
- Faculty: 57
- Grades: 5–12
- Age range: 10-18
- Enrolment: 605, coeducational (2012)
- Classes: 20
- Average class size: 30
- Campus size: 3.5 hectares (8.6 acres)
- Campus type: urban
- Colours: Blue and Gold
- Slogan: Men and women for others
- Athletics: Basketball, football, handball, track & field, swimming
- Accreditation: National Dept. of Education
- Publication: MAGIS
- Endowment: Jesuit Nevelésért Alapítvány
- Budget: 150,000,000 HUF
- Tuition: Free, government sponsored
- Website: www.gimnazium.jezsu.hu

Fényi Gyula Jesuit High School (Fényi Gyula Jezsuita Gimnázium és Kollégium) is a private, co-educational Catholic school located in Miskolc, Hungary, founded in 1994. This is the only Jesuit school in Hungary, founded and operated by the Hungarian Province of the Society of Jesus (SJ). The school's motto is Ad maiora natus sum (Born for greater things), which refers to the Jesuit ideal of the magis. The school was named after Gyula Fényi, a Jesuit priest and astronomer.

All students at Fényi Gyula Jesuit High School receive free tuition, and some are boarders. There are eight grades. The vision of the school is to form young men and women to become leaders in service of others.

== The school ==
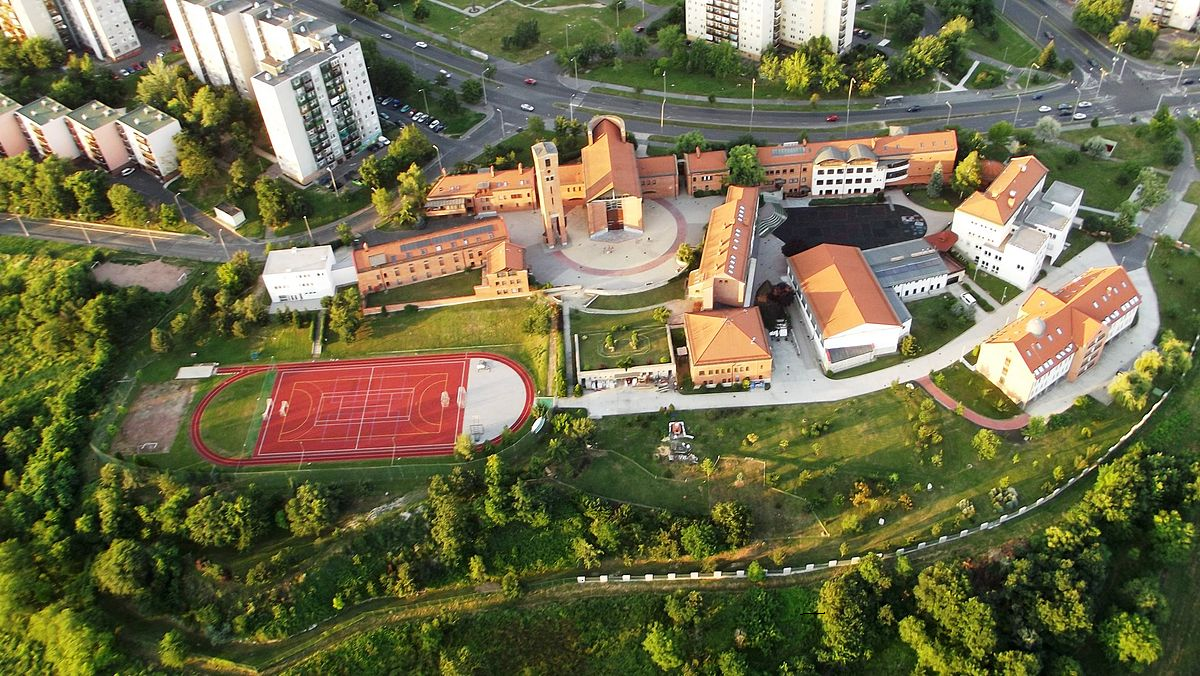

The school welcomes students whose parents prefer a Christian upbringing. The Jesuit High School along with the Roman Catholic religion supports the Greek Catholic and Reformed theologies. Teaching is in Hungarian. Foreign languages taught are English, German, and French, with a Chinese option that begins with a seventh grade study group. The school considers it important for students to study languages at a young age. The diversity of foreign languages is welcoming of exchanges and native teachers. Students regularly score between 4.6 and 5.0 on the Matura graduation exam over all subjects.

Options for better students include more advanced subjects offered from the ninth grade and additional lessons in subjects in grade eleven, preparing them for an advanced level final exam. Electives include music, dance, and art appreciation. The school has modern sports facilities and a swimming pool. The school reaches out to students with special needs: disabilities, dyslexia, visual impairment.

On the school crest, the IHS is the first three letter of Jesus' name in Greek and the double oak branches are a Hungarian symbol for excellence.

== Student life ==
Dances are sponsored by the student council and students publish the newspaper Magis. The school choirs and folk song group showcase Hungarian classical music. The Magis Choir also produces musicals every two years, with religious as well as secular themes. Sports include basketball, handball, football, and gymnasts, with participation in national competitions. Sports teams go under the name Jezsuita; their colors are blue and gold.

== Notable alumni ==
- Balázs Szabó, organist and organ expert
- Dr. Balázs Géza Kövesdi, architect specializing in bridges, adjunct professor at Budapesti Műszaki és Gazdaságtudományi Egyetem
- Albert Barnák, professor of Informatics Systems and Networks, University of Debrecen, Hungary
- Dr. Károly Sándor Pallai, oceanist, creolist, historian of literature, poet, translator, editor, Eötvös Loránd University
- Csilla Gintner, painter and sculptor based in Magyar Képzőművészeti Egyetem

== See also ==
- List of Jesuit sites

== School resources ==
- Gyula
- Hungary
- Jesuits worldwide
- Jesuits, USA
