= Diósgyőri Gimnázium =

Coordinates: 48.1000°N 20.7000°E

Grammar School of Diósgyőr Hungarian: Diósgyőri Gimnázium
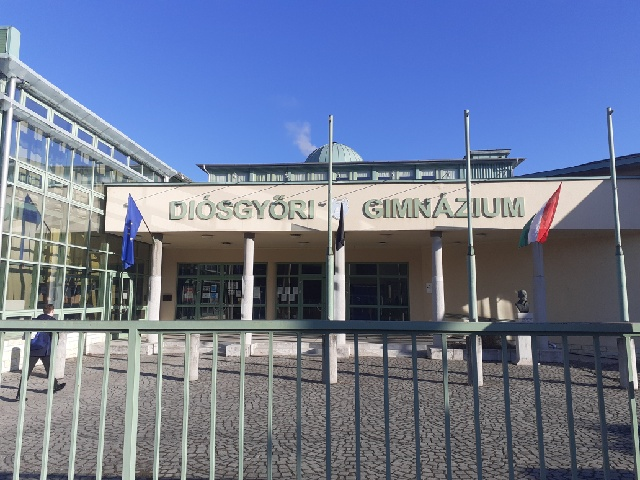

Location
- Miskolc; Hungary

Information
- Former names: The Hungarian Royal State Secondary School (Hungarian: Magyar Királyi Állami Főreáliskola); György Kilián Grammar School

Diósgyőri Gimnázium or Grammar School of Diósgyőr is a Hungarian Grammar School located in the Eastern part of the country, in the city of Miskolc.

== History ==
The predecessor of the school is the Hungarian Royal State Secondary School (Magyar Királyi Állami Főreáliskola) for the teaching of modern languages and sciences, which moved to Miskolc in 1917; it had an eight-grade education system. In 1922 the school took up the name of geographer János Hunfalvy and it was upgraded to the rank of grammar school in 1934, when it became known as the Hunfalvy János Grammar School. The institution was relocated to Kassa (Slovakia) during the Second World War, but it was re-established in Miskolc in 1945.

In the 1950s the school was renamed György Kilián Grammar School. It bears its current name since 1997, named for its proximity to the area of Diósgyőr in Miskolc.

== Observatory ==
The Dr. Gyula Szabó Observatory, which belongs to the school, is situated on the top of a block of flats in the vicinity of the school building. Its main purpose is to provide education in the fields of astronomy and space exploration. The main instrument of the observatory is a Newtonian telescope.
