= Saint Stephen Vocational Secondary School of Economics =

Saint Stephen Vocational Secondary School of Economics is one of technical schools in Budapest

== Eponym ==
The eponym of the school is Stephen I, also Saint Stephen, the first King of Hungary from 1000 or 1001 until his death in 1038. He was born in Esztergom, his pagan name was Vajk. He possibly born in 975 but the date is uncertain. After his death he was canonized as St. Stephen in 1038.

== The institution ==
One of the most imposing building in the IX district, situated between the Lenhossék and Thaly Kálmán street, under Mester street 56-58. The school building houses a dormitory for girls. The main objectives of the school are

- Economics studies
- Information technology
- Foreign languages
- Football and handball

The school focuses on the education of Economics studies. It also offers opportunity to take ECDL exams and has a handball and a football team.

- In this school studied:

• Dr. Sándor Csányi the Managing director of OTP

• Dr László Utassy a Garancia Insurant President-Managing Director
