= Kochanovce, Humenné District =

Kochanovce
- Municipality
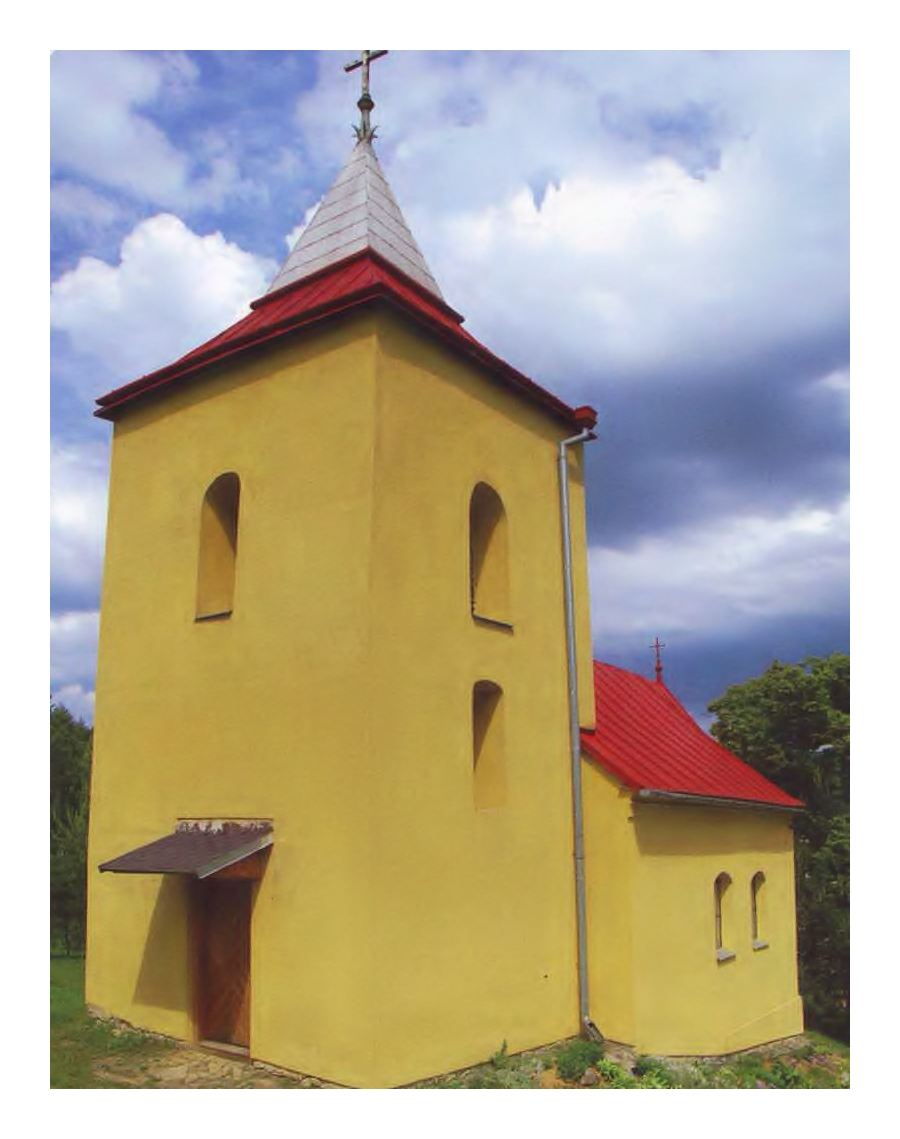

- Flag

- Location of Kochanovce in the Prešov Region Location of Kochanovce in Slovakia
- Coordinates: 48.95°N 21.94°E
- Country: Slovakia
- Region: Prešov Region
- District: Humenné District
- First mentioned: 1543

Government
  - Starosta: Katarína Lászlóová

Area
  - Total: 5.04 km^{2} (1.95 sq mi)
- Elevation: 157 m (515 ft)

Population (2025)
  - Total: 728
- Time zone: UTC+1 (CET)
  - Summer (DST): UTC+2 (CEST)
- Postal code: 660 1
- Area code: +421 57
- Vehicle registration plate (until 2022): HE
- Website: www.kochanovce.sk

Kochanovce is a village and municipality in Humenné District in the Prešov Region of northeast Slovakia.

== History ==
In historical records the village was first mentioned in 1543.

== Geography ==
The municipality lies at an altitude of 157 metres (515 ft) and covers an area of 5.04 km^{2} (1.95 sq mi) (2025).

== Population ==
Population statistic (10 years)
Year	1995	2005	2015	2025
Count	652	740	775	728
Difference		+13.49%	+4.72%	−6.06%

Population statistic
Year	2024	2025
Count	735	728
Difference		−0.95%

It has a population of 728 people (31 December 2025).

=== Ethnicity ===
Census 2021 (1+ %)
Ethnicity	Number	Fraction
Slovak	717	97.28%
Rusyn	23	3.12%
Not found out	9	1.22%
Total	737	

In year 2021 was 737 people by ethnicity 717 as Slovak, 23 as Rusyn, 9 as Not found out, 4 as Other, 2 as Czech, 2 as Polish, 1 as Ukrainian, 1 as Russian and 1 as Hungarian.

Note on population: The difference values of population numbers in the table "Population statistic" and in the sections "Ethnicity" & "Religion" is caused by the use of various statistical methods.

=== Religion ===
Census 2021 (1+ %)
Religion	Number	Fraction
Roman Catholic Church	579	78.56%
Greek Catholic Church	71	9.63%
None	57	7.73%
Eastern Orthodox Church	19	2.58%
Total	737	

In year 2021 was 737 people by religion 579 from Roman Catholic Church, 71 from Greek Catholic Church, 57 from None, 19 from Eastern Orthodox Church, 7 from Not found out, 2 from Apostolic Church, 1 from Evangelical Church and 1 from Church of Jesus Christ of Latter-day Saints.

== Genealogical resources ==
The records for genealogical research are available at the state archive "Statny Archiv in Presov, Slovakia"

- Roman Catholic church records (births/marriages/deaths): 1802-1911 (parish B)
- Greek Catholic church records (births/marriages/deaths): 1768-1946 (parish B)

== See also ==
- List of municipalities and towns in Slovakia
