= Irinyi János Reformed Secondary School =

Hungarian school

Coordinates: 48.24684°N 20.616516°E

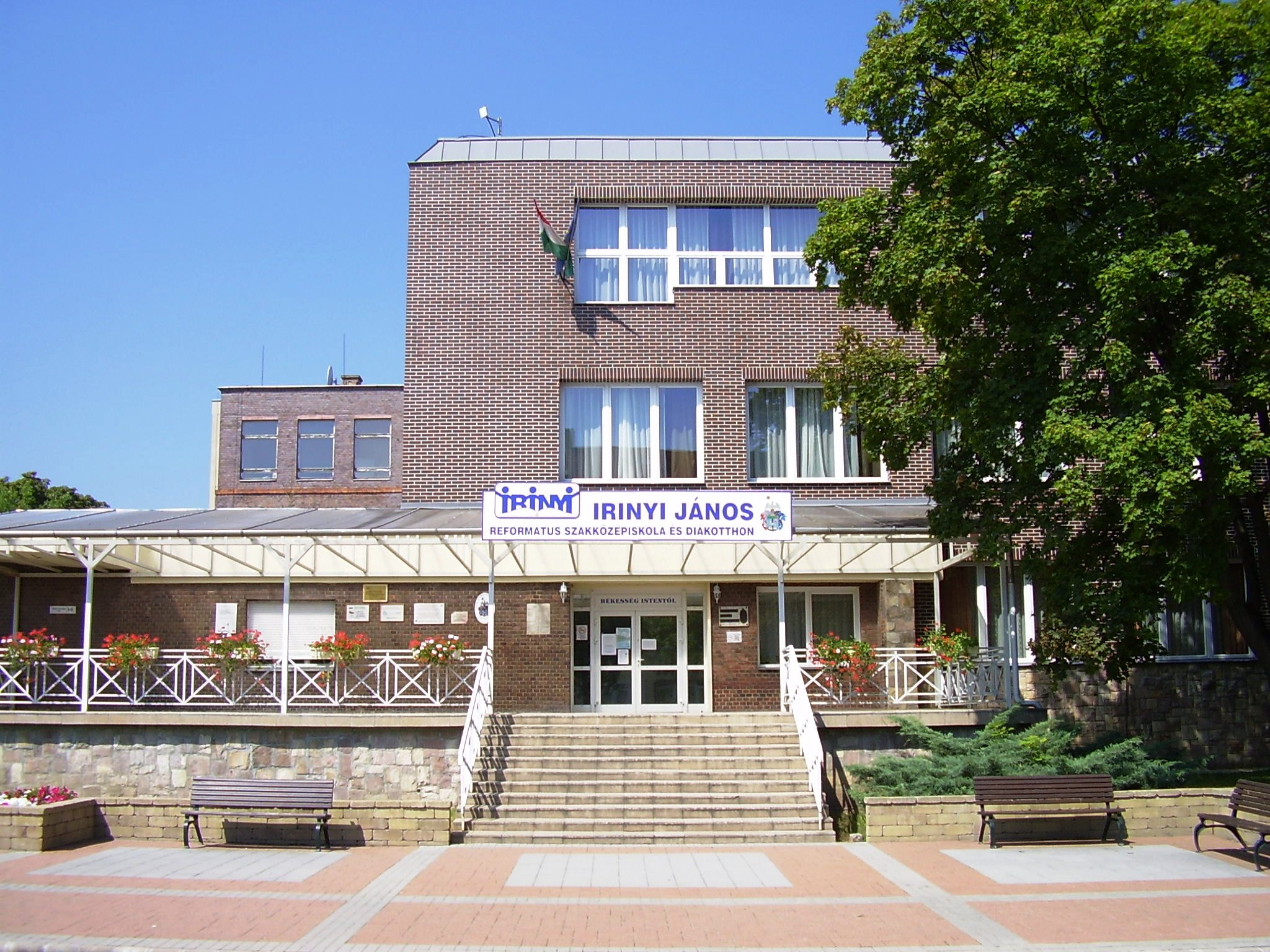

Information
- Established: 1950; 75 years ago

Irinyi János Reformed Secondary School is one of the secondary educational institutions in Kazincbarcika, Borsod-Abaúj-Zemplén county, Hungary.

== History ==
The predecessor of today's Irinyi János Reformed Secondary School was founded in 1950, in Hatvan, as a chemical technical school, and was moved to its present city, Kazincbarcika, in 1956. Over the years, the address of the headquarters of the school changed several times, but it stayed within the boundaries of Kazincbarcika. In the beginnings, strong ties connected the school and the BVK, the chemical company in Kazincbarcika. The company needed workforce, so young chemists could start working at the BVK right after they finished their studies. By 1990, this demand totally disappeared, and the school did not launch chemical course that year at all. 8 years later, though, the BorsodChem Rt. (former BVK) needed skilled workforce again, so the chemist training was restarted in 1998. The management of the school introduced new courses and trainings to keep up with the times, and to satisfy the changing requirements of the people.

== Present ==
Due to the financial difficulties of the country, many Hungarian schools (primary schools, secondary schools) have already been closed, and some universities will soon be closed in the near future. In many cases, the Church takes over the management of schools which are to be closed down, and supports these institutions. Irinyi János Secondary School was taken over by the Church in 2013, and its name has been changed to Irinyi János Reformed Secondary School.

== Education ==
Today, Irinyi János Reformed Secondary School provides

=== Courses ===
- Economics course with English/German language specialization
- Economics
- IT

=== Technical trainings ===
- Chemistry
- Accountancy

== Further information ==
Irinyi János Reformed Secondary School is an ECDL examination center as well as home for CISCO Academy.

== Sources ==
- Irinyi János Szakközépsikola és Diákotthon
- Az Irinyi János Szakközépiskola krónikája dióhéjban, a kezdetektől az 1989/90-es tanéven át napjainkig (a teljesség igénye nélkül)
- Kazincbarcikai Diákotthonok
