= Alternative Secondary School of Economics =

Coordinates: 47.545720849190126°N 19.043109278109345°E

- Hungarian: Alternatív Közgazdasági Gimnázium
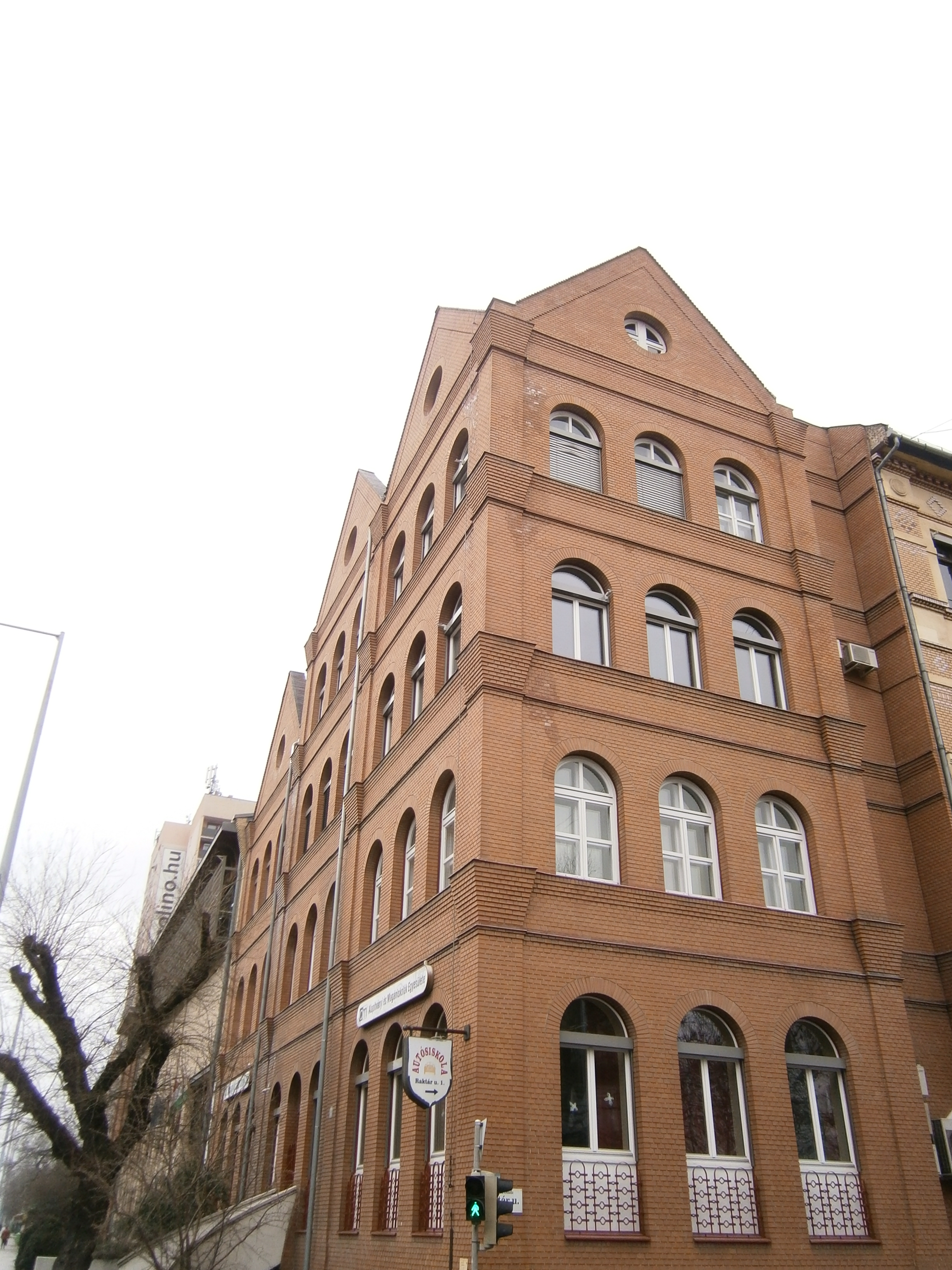

Information
- Established: 1988; 38 years ago

The Alternative Secondary School of Economics (Hungarian: Alternatív Közgazdasági Gimnázium; AKG), is a six-year high school in Budapest, Hungary. The basic educational principle of the school is that a child is not preparing for life but is living it. The school has given up the traditional instruments of institutional regulation, including house rules, systems of punishment and reward. These have been replaced with the free flow of information and the freedom of choice, emphasising the individual personalities of students, and taking into account their personal needs and concerns. The nature of this freedom changes along with the different stages of the students' life in the school.

== Address ==
AKG can be found at 1035, Raktár utca 1.

== History ==
AKG has the distinction of being the first non-state school in Hungary (established in 1988). Hungary had no private education since the collectivization that followed the second World War. It was established as an independent teachers' workshop. Its founders and organizers were all practicing educators, who created and developed the curriculum over two years.

== Educational system ==
In Hungary, students typically apply to a high school in either 6th or 8th grade. Hungarian students in public education are in high school for 6 and 4 years respectively, depending on when they started, with everybody graduating in 12th grade. AKG has 7-year and 5-year programs available for students, due to the language year, delaying graduation by a year.

=== Years 7–10 ===
The purpose of this period is to provide students with basic education in a wide variety of subjects, to ensure literacy and familiarity in any field they may go into later. Classes are organized into epochs with the epoch-system.

Briefly summarized, the epoch system allows students to focus on specific subjects for extended periods of time. Students have two epoch classes every day, with each lasting 80 minutes. Each class "slot" has a dedicated subject. Epochs are cyclical, with small tests every week and epoch-ending tests after three weeks. Traditionally, there are no pop-quizzes in this system. Epoch slots shift after every end of unit test. For example, a student could have a mathematics and a history epoch. Every Monday, they would write a test in these subjects. After three weeks, they would write the end of unit test and move on to literature and science epochs. Once those are done, they go back to mathematics and history, until the school year ends. A year has 5 epoch cycles.

Critical to AKG is the "patronal system", which runs parallel to the epoch system. The largest unit of community in AKG is the school year, consisting of individuals who started in the same year. "Years" are divided into "stacks", which learn epochs together. A stack is roughly 30 people, with a year being made of 2 or 3 stacks. Students of AKG pick the name of their community, so they aren't categorized into sterile, alpha-numerical systems. The name of a year is composed of the names of its stacks. For example, year "King-Kong" would have stacks named King and Kong, and a year named "Veni-Vidi-Vici" would have stacks named Veni, Vidi and Vici. Stacks are further subdivided into patronal groups. Patrons are (usually) the individuals who teach epochs to the students. PGs are the smallest unit of community in AKG, being designed as ready-made communities for students in the first few years, but they usually give way to organically formed friend-circles and lose relevance over time.

Students are mandated to pick at least one extracurricular activity every year during this period.

School doesn't start immediately with classes, instead, there is an opening activity every day. The activity is decided upon the patrons of that year. This acts as a buffer zone between classes and home life, so students don't just drop into a busy environment. This can be discussing important world news, upcoming school events, playing a game, or anything else that engages the students but isn't related to the curriculum.

=== Year 11/language ===
During this year, students learn a third language. During the previous years, all students typically reach at least mid-level competency in English. In this year, they have to drop English and learn a new language. German, Spanish, or French are the usual choices. Students are given the option to organize additional languages themselves but this is rare.

The goal of this year is for students to achieve at least B2 level competency in their language of choice. They spend 18 hours every week learning with a native speaker. Education is closely tied to the culture of the language's nation, and so this doubles as cultural education as well. Students also have two media-studies classes every week and physical education. Extracurricular activities are available but not mandatory. School days are relatively short this year to let students work on their year-long-project and to explore what interests them, because next year they have to pick a subject to specialize in.

=== Years 11–12 ===
In the final period, AKG shifts back to traditional 45-minute classes, because there is no time for the deep engagement of epochs, as the students are working on their "maturity exam", the points of which are used when applying to higher education at home and abroad. Students pick a subject they would like to specialize in, and are sorted into classes based on the level they want to pursue it on (All subjects can be basic, middle, or advanced. Students don't bother with basic training because it is essentially worthless, middle is the common choice with advanced being chosen by ambitious students applying to schools abroad. The difficulty correlates with the amount of material students have to learn. This is the same across all of Hungary.). Stacks stop existing, as students are now sorted into specializations, not arbitrary groups.

== Projects ==
In AKG, students take part in a variety of subjects over the years. In the first few years, students work on short term projects that last 1–3 weeks, either alone or in groups. This can be anything from assembling a poetry collection to creating a model of a scientist's laboratory.

Additionally, students must work on two year-long projects. The first, the "Family History", is done over the course of the entirety of the 10th grade. Students must perform original research, assemble materials (such as letters and photographs) and create an in-depth documentation of the history of their family in the 20th century.

The second year-long project, during the language year, is freely chosen by the students (but approved by the patrons). It is usually some sort of synthetic activity, with an end result, although this is not always the case. Students also have to pick a mentor who is an expert and can help them with their project. For example, if a student is writing music as a project, their mentor could be their music teacher. Family and friends are usually not allowed to be mentors, to ensure that they don't do the project instead of the student. The students receive a grade for this work, and must meet certain standards to pass and move on to the 11th grade. Although the presentation of the project and the work itself are important in the grading, the most valued component is the documentation of the student's work, because the point of the project is to get students used to working on long time scales, not just a few weeks at a time.

== Extracurricular activities ==
AKG offers its students a wide variety of extracurricular activities. They can be graded or non-graded. Once a student picks one, they have to do it for the whole year. An extracurricular activity can only begin if at least 8 people apply. If at least 8 people come together with an activity they would like to do, the school assists them with organizing it and finding a teacher

Student's in AKG can partake in the following extracurricular activities, among many others: hosting a radio show which is broadcast across the school, taking part in drama clubs themed around world cultures, video and photo clubs, writing for the school newspaper. Students can also join clubs themed around things they like studying or would like to study later, like marketing, biology, physics, mathematics, etc. Students can also get experience working with lab equipment in the laboratory club, or with basic medicine in the first aid club.

AKG has a robotics club, renowned in Hungary for its great success in many competitions. It deals with designing, building and programming robots using Lego Mindstorms sets, as well as 3D design and printing. Currently, the club is mentored by Gergely Nádori and Judit Pásztor. Students who have been in the club for at least a year can go to the FIRST LEGO League.

Students can also work with more advanced robotics platforms, such as Arduino, ESP, Micro:Bit and Lego EV3.

== Theme-week ==
In AKG, a theme week is a whole week of school in which students have no classes and each year has one specific theme based on which they create projects. All years have their theme week at the same time.

AKG has 5 theme weeks every year. One at the start of the school year, one a week before winter break, two during spring, and one in June. Three of them are held within the school, two of them are held outside of the school. There are recurring themes, such as the science-themed natural excursions, and some are one time, such as visiting a rural village.

== Little-epochs ==
Little-epochs are short, but important, topics that don't warrant an entire theme-week. This can be something like first aid, or how to study effectively. Little epochs replace one of the epoch slots for a week, and on average occur every 5 weeks.

== Structure of social spaces ==
Physically, AKG can be interpreted as a sum of many "little schools". A LS is a self contained social space with a classroom for each stack, a kitchen, a central social area, bathrooms and a teacher's lounge. Students are allowed to make the space their own with changes and decorations, but the physical integrity and cleanliness of the space must be maintained. Students leave the LS for things like clubs and classes that require special equipment (music, P.E., science, etc.) but they spend the vast majority of their days here. Whenever a year graduates, their LS is renovated, to make way for the next year coming in September.

== School traditions ==
=== Sleep over ===
Students in AKG frequently have in-school sleepovers, either with their patronal group or their club. During the night, the school is almost completely empty, and students can do whatever they want (within reason, of course). Common favorites are playing hide and seek in the labyrinthine halls, watching movies, or playing dodgeball. One teacher has to be in the building with the students for supervisory purposes. Students bring their own sleeping bags, and sleep on lobby-couches, or gym mats. The robotics team frequently does sleep-ins before competitions for additional crunch time, so much so that a running joke amongst students is that the robotics team lives in the building and never leaves.

=== Patron picking ===
First year students have a special introductory camp, the purpose of which is to let them get to know the other students and the patrons. At the end of the camp, students rank the patrons on a scale, according to how much they want to be their student. On the last night, the patrons are up all night sorting people into patronal groups. On the final morning, students learn of their patronal group for the next few years during a ceremony, which is usually designed by the patrons.

Once the groups are made, they eat breakfast together to get to know each other even better.

=== Science Night ===
Science Night is a 4–5 hour program in October, completely open to the public. Guests can get to know various fields of science, experiments, and the lives of important intellectuals. Activities are organized either by relevant clubs, or vetted outsiders. Anything from electronics to chemistry can be found on Science Night. There are several comforts offered to guests, such as a room-sized wardrobe for coats and a snack shop run by students. The event's primary function is marketing and PR for AKG.

=== Christmas in AKG ===
A theme-week precedes Christmas every year, but years themselves organize gifting events according to the desires of students. "Secret Santa" is popular with young students, but the older members of AKG prefer less scripted holidays and usually don't bother with gifting

== Response to the coronavirus crisis ==
AKG has been transitioning to digital education for many years, so the switch to long-distance schooling in March 2020 was easier than for most but not without hurdles. In September, special protocols were developed to ensure that as much time could be spent in school as possible, while also containing infections locally. The central idea is that one year is one self-contained community, and contact between years must be minimized and eliminated wherever possible. The protocols are as follows:

- Vertically integrated extracurricular activities have been disbanded for the foreseeable future.
- If a student receives a positive test result, their year goes into quarantine for two weeks (counting from when the test was performed). Students take part in digital education for the duration of their isolation.
- The school cafeteria is closed. Meals from the kitchen are delivered directly to years in crates, and the snack shop has time slots for each year.
- Students may not leave and enter the building freely once their classes have started. They can leave permanently for something like a dentist appointment, or wait until their classes are over to go shopping.
- Students must wear masks during classes, but not in social spaces. Masks may be taken off for eating and drinking.

These rules were current as of October 2020.

In November 2020, AKG went into permanent lockdown following government mandates, and such restrictions lasted until nearly the end of the school year in May 2021. However, by September, more than 95% of the student population and 98% of the staff had been fully vaccinated, leading to more lenient protocols.

As of September 2021, the government of Hungary has no official COVID-19 restrictions regarding education, so everything AKG does is self-imposed. Students must wear masks at all times and have to get tested weekly. The cost of the tests is shouldered by students. Years go into a ten day quarantine when more than three of their students test positive in a given week. Food is available at the cafeteria again and the rule regarding leaving the building has returned to its pre-pandemic state. The state of school policy is changing rapidly as the situation evolves.
