= Imola (disambiguation) =

Imola is a town in Italy.

Imola may also refer to:

- Autodromo Internazionale Enzo e Dino Ferrari, a race track near Imola
- Pagani Imola, a limited-production, street-legal variant of the famous Huayra supercar
- Imola, California, an unincorporated community in the US
- Imola, Hungary, a village
