= Kany =

Kany may refer to:

- Kány, village in Hungary
- Kany (dancer), Senegalese-French dancer, choreographer and entertainer
