= Gadna =

Gadna may refer to:

== Places ==
- Gadna (village), a Hungarian village

== Organizations ==
- Gadna (Israel), an Israeli youth military program
- Gadna Tel Aviv Yehuda F.C., an Israeli football club
