= Bones Ely =

American baseball player (1863–1952)

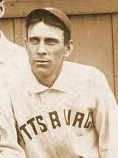
- Shortstop
- Born: June 7, 1863; North Girard, Pennsylvania, U.S.
- Died: January 10, 1952 (aged 88); Imola, California, U.S.
- Batted: Right Threw: Right

MLB debut
- June 19, 1884, for the Buffalo Bisons

Last MLB appearance
- September 24, 1902, for the Washington Senators

MLB statistics
- Batting average: .258
- Home runs: 24
- Runs batted in: 657
- Stats at Baseball Reference

Teams
- Buffalo Bisons (1884); Louisville Colonels (1886); Syracuse Stars (1890); Brooklyn Grooms (1891); St. Louis Browns (1893–1895); Pittsburgh Pirates (1896–1901); Philadelphia Athletics (1901); Washington Senators (1902)

William Frederick "Bones" Ely (June 7, 1863 – January 10, 1952) was an American shortstop in Major League Baseball. He was born in North Girard, Pennsylvania.

Ely was the starting shortstop for the Pittsburgh Pirates for several seasons before Honus Wagner. Immediately before his release during the 1901 season, an article in The Buffalo Enquirer described the only thing standing between Wagner and Pittsburgh's shortstop job was "Bones Ely, who has gone back faster than an incline car that has slipped a cable. Ely cannot hit a balloon and his fielding is passe."

During the 1904 season, Bones Ely along with his brother Ben Ely purchased the Portland Browns of the Pacific Coast League. Bones Ely managed 33 games that season before resigning his position on May 16. The Ely brothers sold their shares of the team to Walter McCredie and William Wallace McCredie before the end of the season.

Ely died at the age of 88 in Imola, California. His remains were cremated.
