= Felsődobsza =

- Village
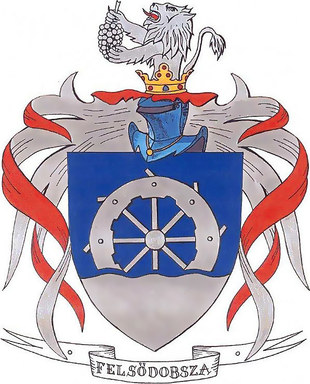
- Seal

- Location within Hungary
- Coordinates: 48°15′22.18″N 21°4′22.26″E
- Country: Hungary
- Regions: Northern Hungary
- County: Borsod-Abaúj-Zemplén County

Area
  - Total: 15.19 km^{2} (5.86 sq mi)

Population (2008)
  - Total: 978
- Time zone: UTC+1 (CET)
  - Summer (DST): UTC+2 (CEST)

Felsődobsza is a village in Borsod-Abaúj-Zemplén County in northeastern Hungary. As of 2008, it had a population of 978.
