= Keresztéte =

Coordinates: 48°30′N 20°57′E

- Village
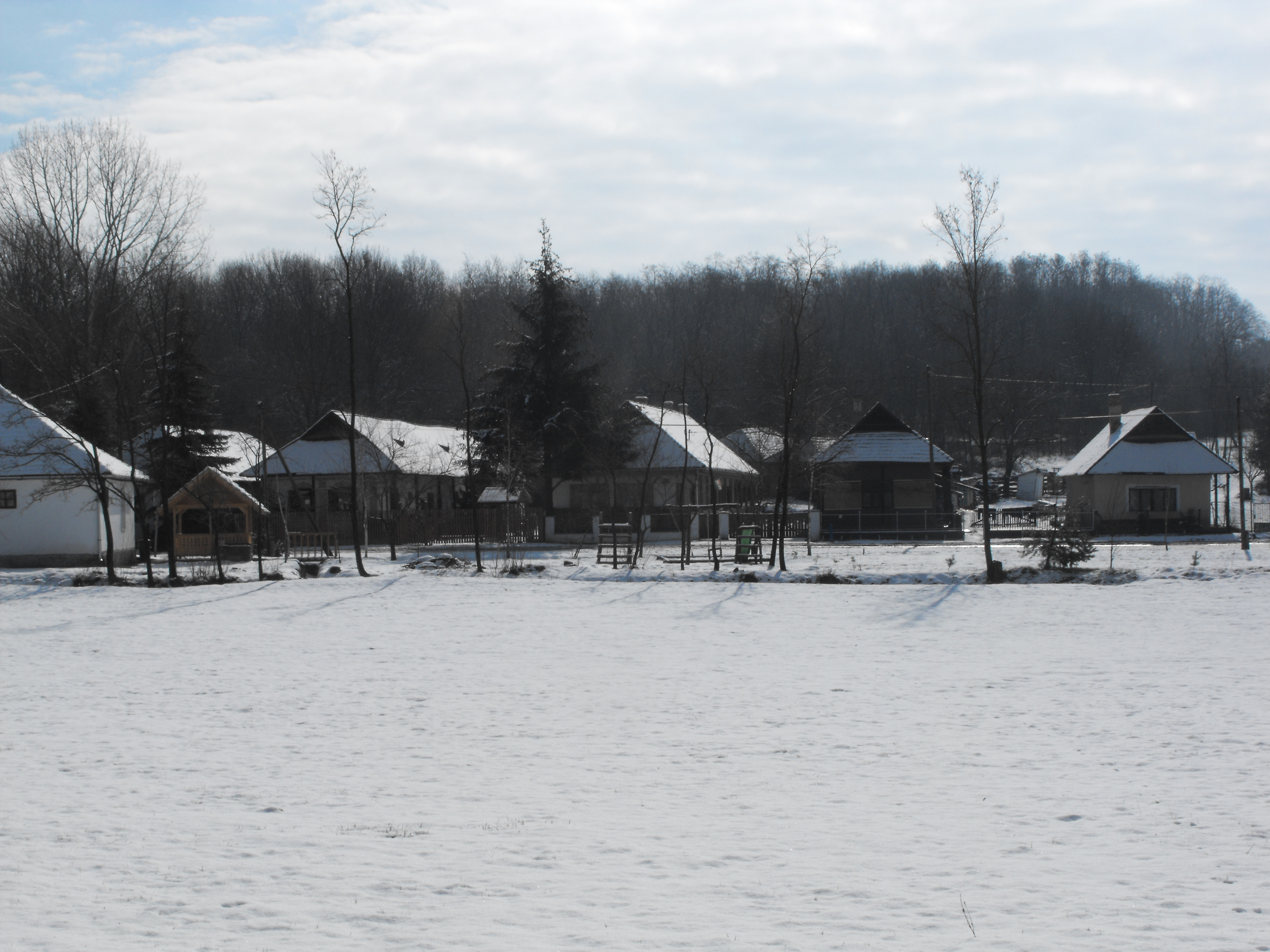
- Cserehat Keresztete Houses
- Interactive map of Keresztéte
- Country: Hungary
- Regions: Northern Hungary
- County: Borsod-Abaúj-Zemplén County
- Time zone: UTC+1 (CET)
  - Summer (DST): UTC+2 (CEST)

Keresztéte is a village in Borsod-Abaúj-Zemplén County in northeastern Hungary.
