= Szakáld =

Coordinates: 47°57′N 20°55′E

- Village
- Interactive map of Szakáld
- Country: Hungary
- Regions: Northern Hungary
- County: Borsod-Abaúj-Zemplén County
- Time zone: UTC+1 (CET)
  - Summer (DST): UTC+2 (CEST)

Szakáld is a village in Borsod-Abaúj-Zemplén County in northeastern Hungary.
