= Tiszabábolna =

Coordinates: 47°41′N 20°49′E

- Village
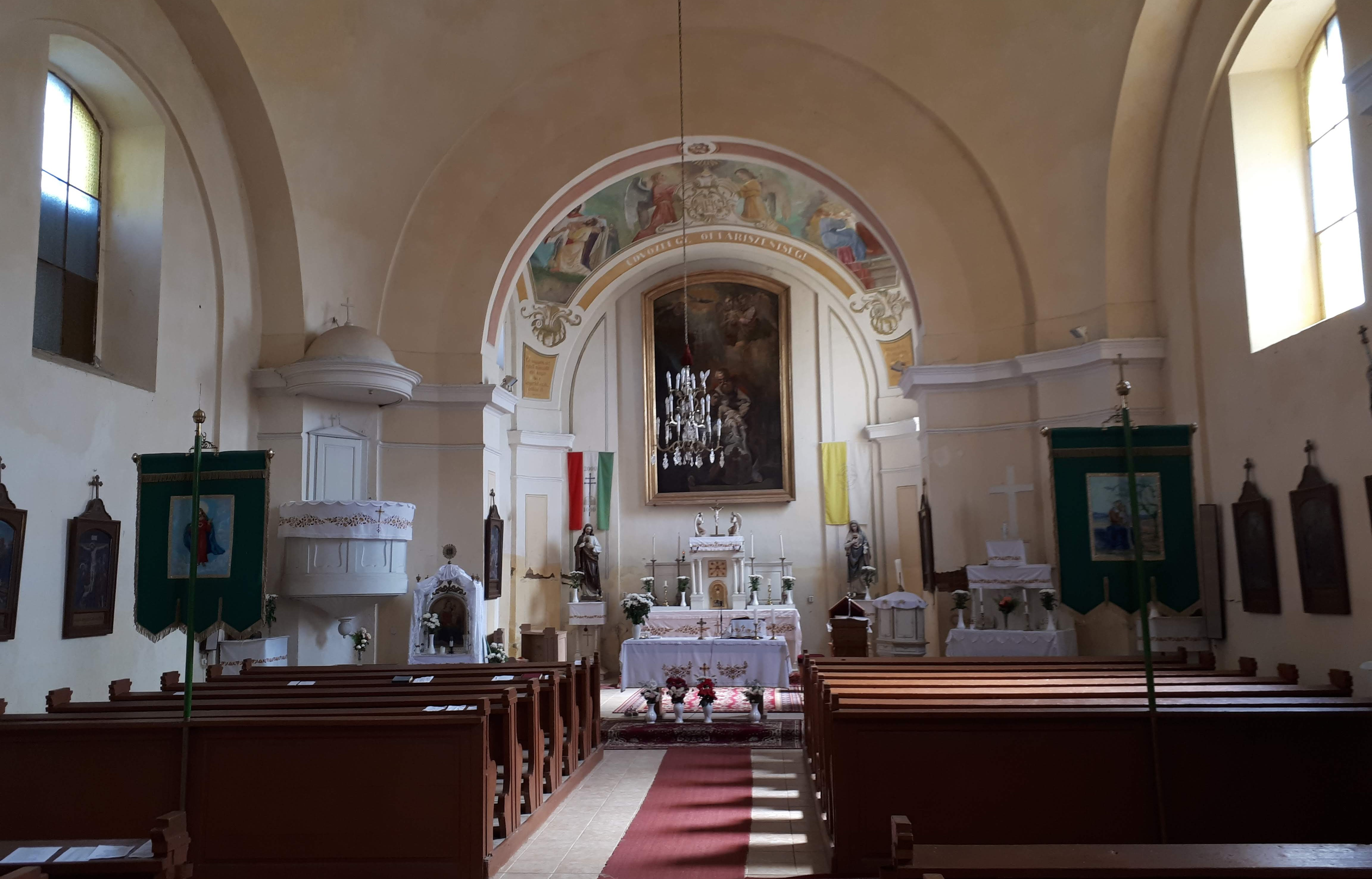
- A tiszabábolnai templom belseje
- Interactive map of Tiszabábolna
- Country: Hungary
- Regions: Northern Hungary
- County: Borsod-Abaúj-Zemplén County
- Time zone: UTC+1 (CET)
  - Summer (DST): UTC+2 (CEST)

Tiszabábolna is a village in Borsod-Abaúj-Zemplén County in northeastern Hungary.
