= Sóstófalva =

Coordinates: 48°09′N 21°00′E

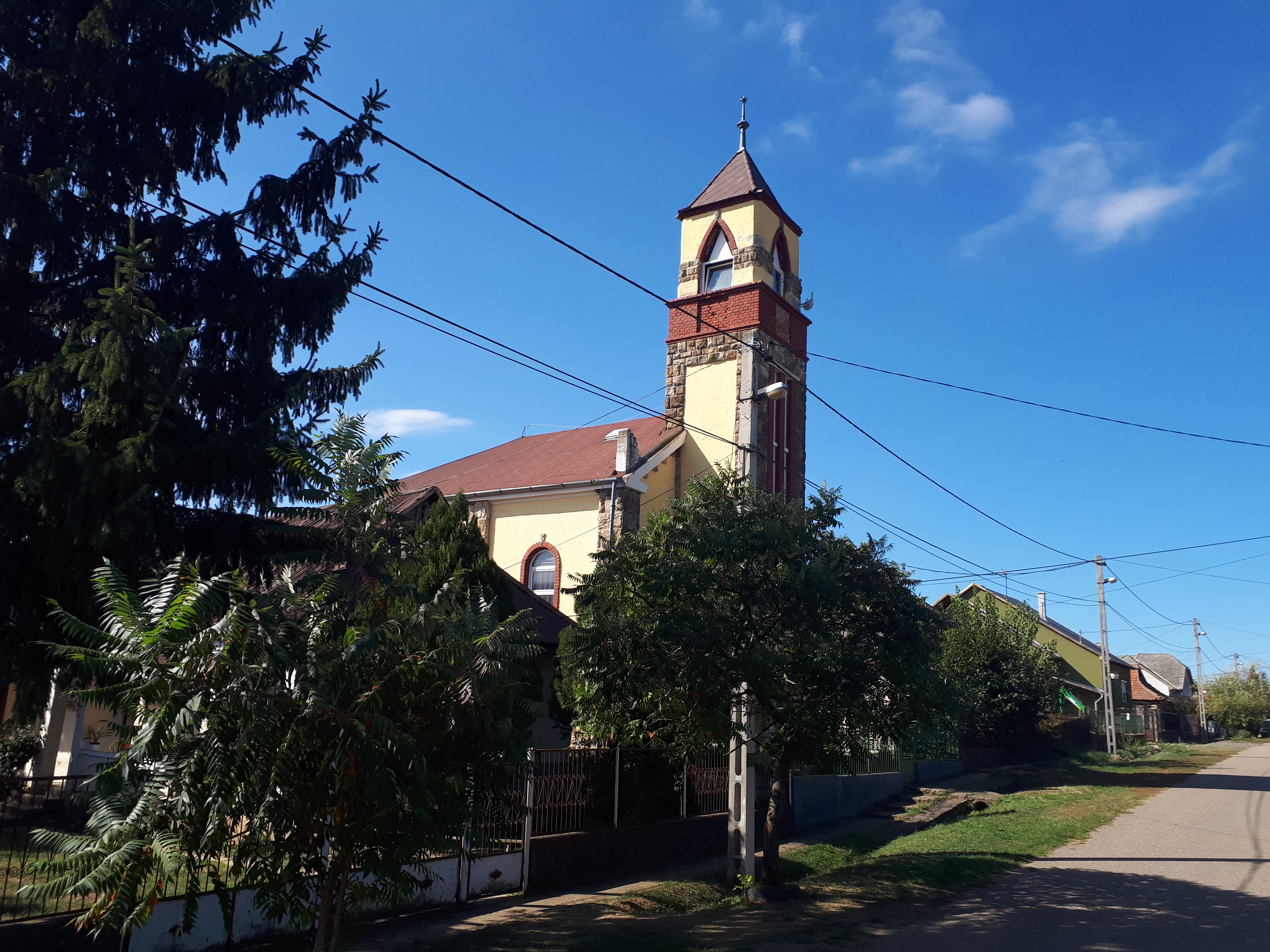
Sóstófalva
- Village
- Interactive map of Sóstófalva
- Country: Hungary
- Regions: Northern Hungary
- County: Borsod-Abaúj-Zemplén County
- Time zone: UTC+1 (CET)
  - Summer (DST): UTC+2 (CEST)

Sóstófalva is a village in Borsod-Abaúj-Zemplén County in northeastern Hungary.
