= Sajóörös =

Coordinates: 47°57′N 21°02′E

- Village
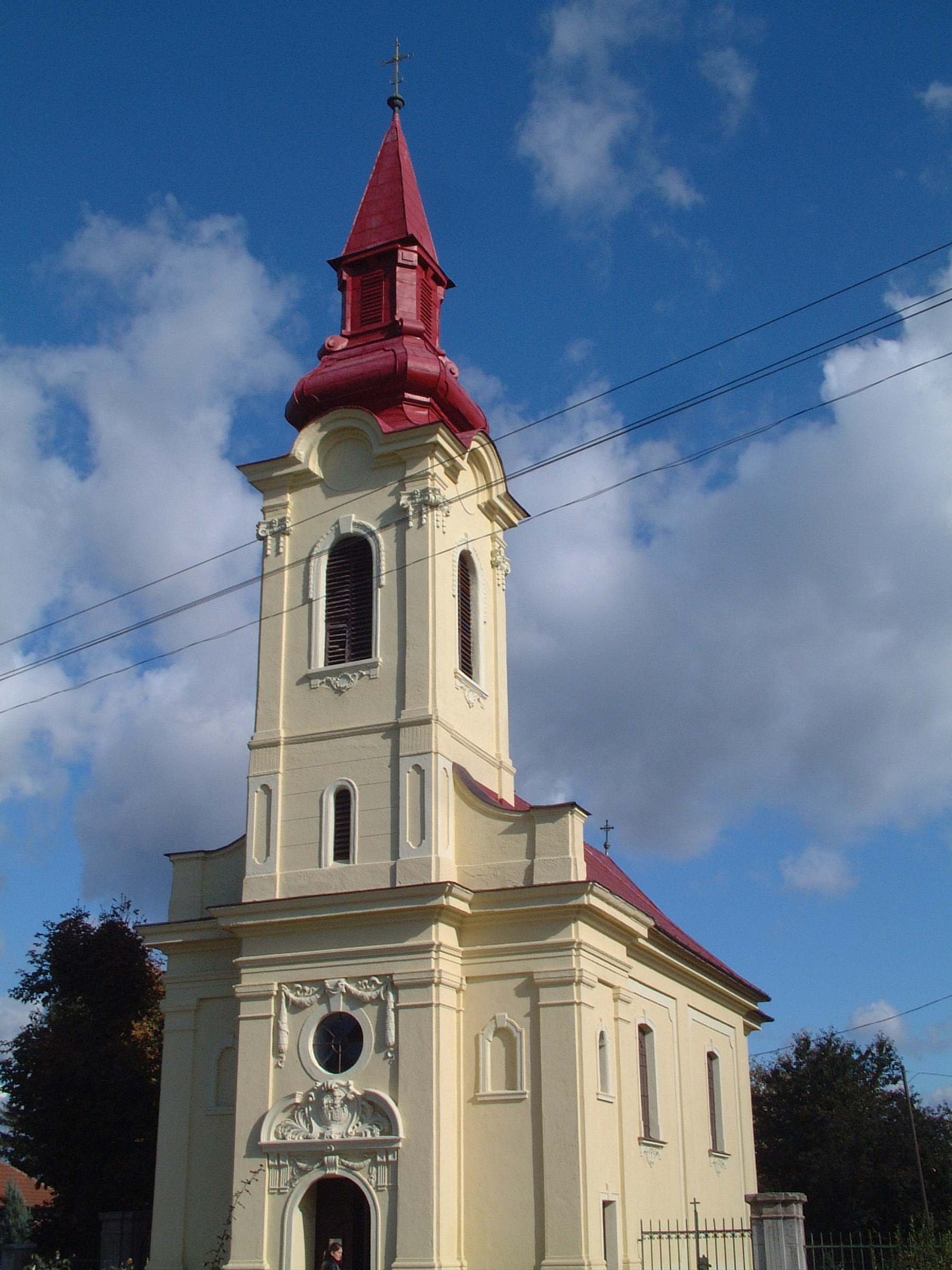
- A sajóörösi katolikus templom
- Interactive map of Sajóörös
- Country: Hungary
- Regions: Northern Hungary
- County: Borsod-Abaúj-Zemplén County
- Time zone: UTC+1 (CET)
  - Summer (DST): UTC+2 (CEST)

Sajóörös is a village in Borsod-Abaúj-Zemplén County in northeastern Hungary.
