= Borsod Power Plant =

Power plant in Hungary

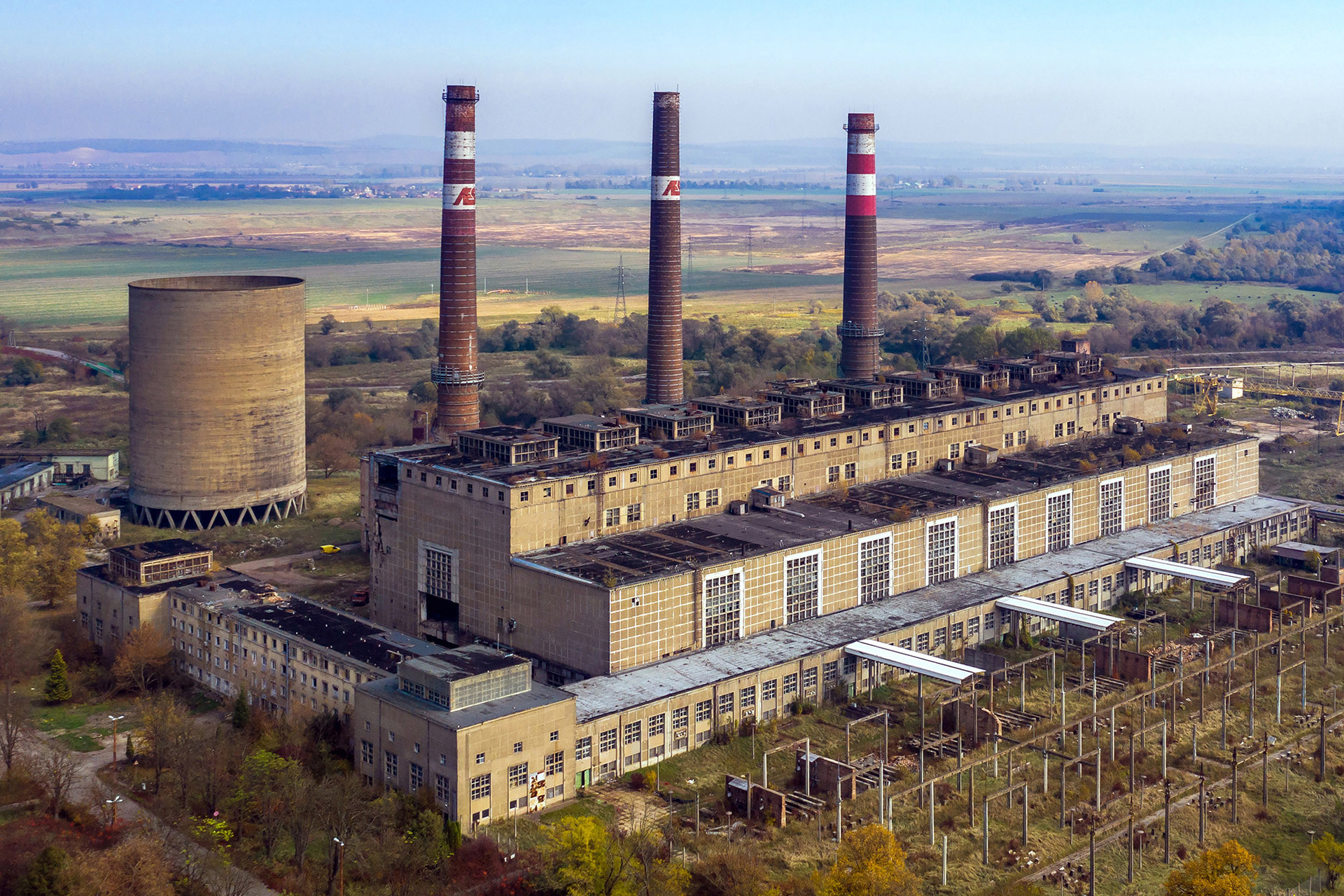
- Country: Hungary
- Location: Borsod-Abaúj-Zemplén County
- Coordinates: 48°14′05″N 20°41′05″E
- Status: Operational
- Commission date: 12 February 1955
- Decommission date: 2011
- Owner: AES Corporation

Thermal power station
- Primary fuel: Biomass

Power generation
- Nameplate capacity: 40 MW

External links
- Commons: Related media on Commons

The Borsod Power Plant was one of Hungary's largest biomass power plants having an installed heat capacity of 200 MW and electric capacity of 40 MW. During the 1950s, the plant was one of the biggest coal-fired power plants in the country. The power plant ceased commercial operations in 2011 and has been undergoing demolition since 2014.

== History ==
The Borsod Coal Mines Co. Ltd. thermal power plant—known as the “Small Power Plant” (Kiserőmű)—was already operating in Barcika in 1924. The 5.4 MW plant had three boilers and three turbines; it primarily served the surrounding mines but also supplied electricity to the city of Eger via a 96 km, 35 kV transmission line. This power plant operated continuously until 1957, and then as a peak-load plant until 1962. For one year it served as the hot standby for the then-new Borsod Thermal Power Plant; afterwards it ceased operations entirely as an electricity supplier. The staff of the Barcika Small Power Plant were given jobs at the Borsod Thermal Power Plant.

The power plant was established as part of the Sajó Valley industrial development program, following the directives of the First Five-Year Plan. Construction began in 1951 at the lower boundary of the village of Berente, by the Malomárok near the Sajó River, on agricultural land that had remained undeveloped until the 1950s. In 1954 Berente was annexed to Kazincbarcika, which was then becoming a town, and thus the area became part of the city as well. Nevertheless, the plant continued to be often referred to as the “Berente Thermal Power Plant” even after its official name had changed. The plant's chief designer was the renowned reinforced-concrete engineer Gyula Mátrai (also known as Gottwald). The architectural design of the facades is credited to Bertalan Árkay.

Several East German (GDR) companies participated in the construction and equipment of the power plant up until 1957. Among the major Hungarian firms involved were Láng Machine Factory, Ganz Electrical Works, the April 4 Machine Factory, Construction Company No. 31, the Electric Installation Industrial Company, and the Electric Power Plant Design Company.

On October 1, 1952, the Borsod Thermal Power Plant Company was established. The first generator was connected in parallel on February 11, 1955. Later that year two more units came online, and in 1956 an additional three units began operation. At its start the plant's output was 194 MW, representing 20% of Hungary's national electricity capacity at the time. It was then the largest power plant in the country. After the trial runs, construction was completed in 1959 and the plant was officially inaugurated in 1962.

Because of the development programs of the Borsod Chemical Complex's PVC production and the increasing district heating demand of Kazincbarcika, major modifications were carried out in the 1960s. In the middle of the decade a heating center was built, part of the condensing turbines were converted, heating turbines were installed, and water treatment was significantly altered.

Before the political transition of 1989–1990, the plant employed over one thousand people.

In 1991 the power plant was integrated into Tiszai Erőmű Rt. From December 1993, together with the adjacent coal sorting facility and the Lyukó Mine, it continued operations as an independent business unit under the name Borsod Energetics Ltd. In 1996 Borsod Energetics Ltd. was acquired by the American energy service company AES Corporation. In 2000 the Tiszapalkonya Thermal Power Plant was merged into Borsod Energetics Ltd., and from that time the company's name was changed to AES Borsod Energetics Ltd.

In 2002 AES Borsod Energetics Ltd. signed a 10-year contract with regional forestry companies to purchase 270 thousand tons of beech and oak annually. This amount was sufficient to fuel two boilers. Between 2002 and 2003 the power plant converted two coal-dust-fired boilers to biomass firing. The fuel consisted mostly of logs, wood chips, and sawdust, but it was also possible to burn agricultural by-products such as sunflower seed hulls, wheat bran, and crushed corn cobs.

=== Closure and decommissioning ===
The power plant was shut down in 2011 by the American company AES. The decision was driven primarily by the long-term decline in wholesale electricity prices. The plant was operating at low utilization and at a loss, while at the same time the national electric utility could import electricity cheaper. Contributing factors included rising coal and biomass prices, as well as increasing costs for carbon-dioxide emissions. At the time of closure, the plant employed 123 workers. When the 71 MW Borsod Power Plant—then operating on a biomass basis—was taken offline, negotiations for its sale were launched simultaneously. A joint-stock company made a purchase offer for the facility later that same year, but the deal fell through. After eleven failed tenders and amid circumstances disputed by the unsuccessful bidders, the Ukrainian FMG-BUD consortium bought AES Borsod Energetics Ltd. in 2014 for 604 million forints. Since then, the power plant has been in the process of demolition.
