= Nemesbikk =

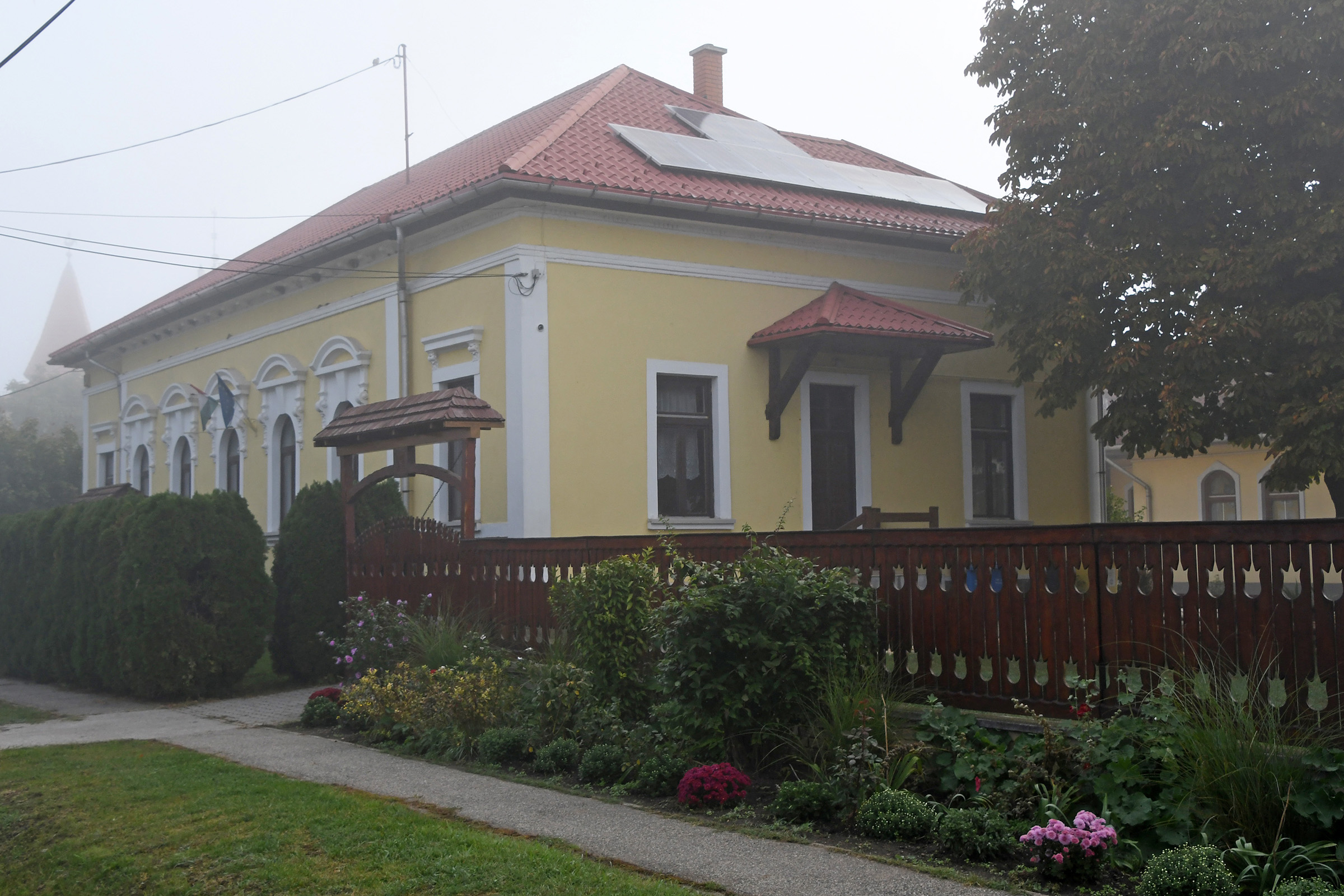
- Village hall

- Location of Borsod-Abaúj-Zemplén county in Hungary

- Location of Nemesbikk
- Coordinates: 47.88665°N 20.96604°E
- Country: Hungary
- County: Borsod-Abaúj-Zemplén

Area
  - Total: 24.1 km^{2} (9.3 sq mi)

Population (2004)
  - Total: 1,044
  - Density: 43.31/km^{2} (112.2/sq mi)
- Time zone: UTC+1 (CET)
  - Summer (DST): UTC+2 (CEST)
- Postal code: 3592
- Area code: 49

Nemesbikk is a village in Borsod-Abaúj-Zemplén county, Hungary.
