= Borsod–Abaúj–Zemplén County =

County in north-eastern Hungary

Borsod-Abaúj-Zemplén County Borsod-Abaúj-Zemplén megye
- Counties of Hungary
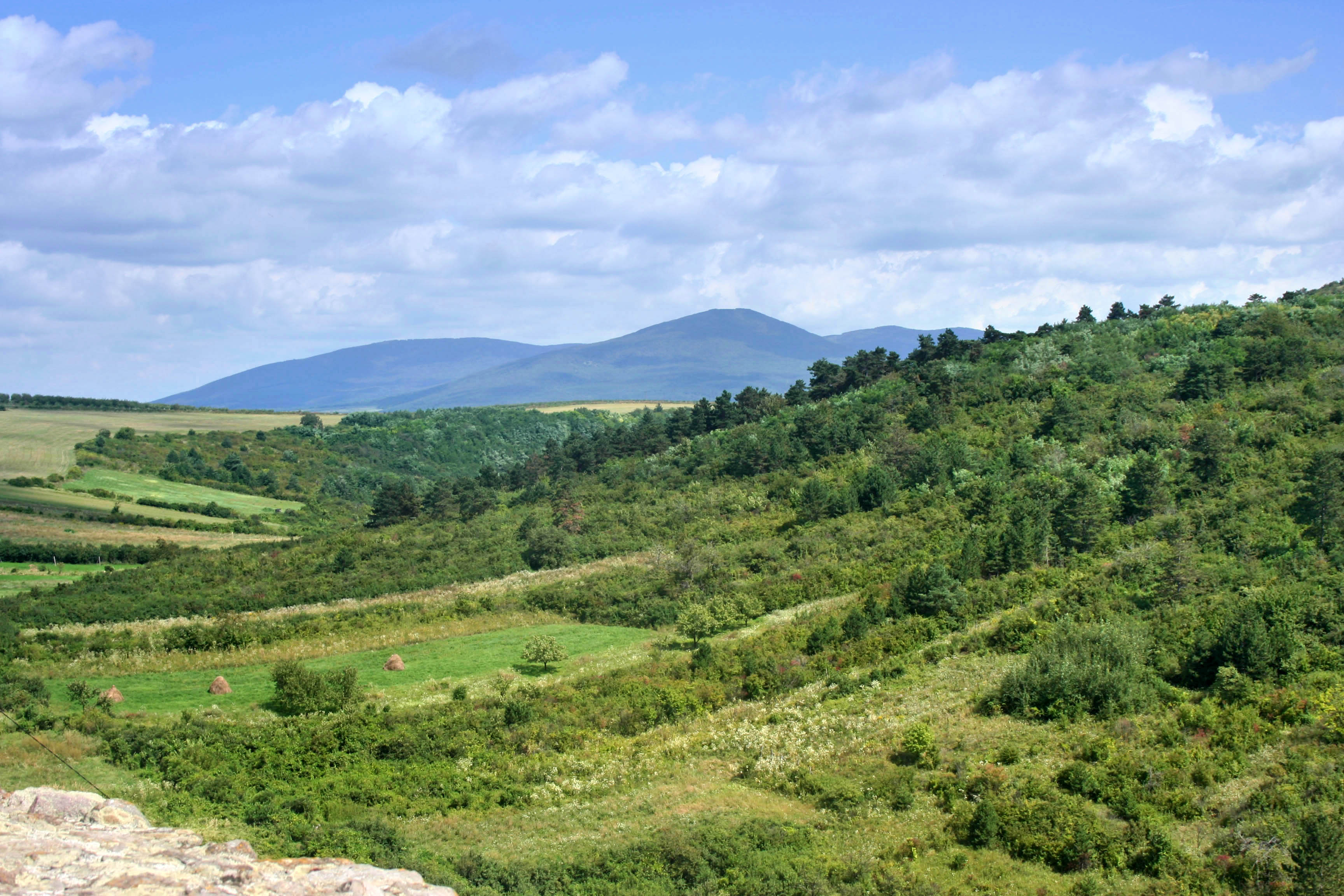
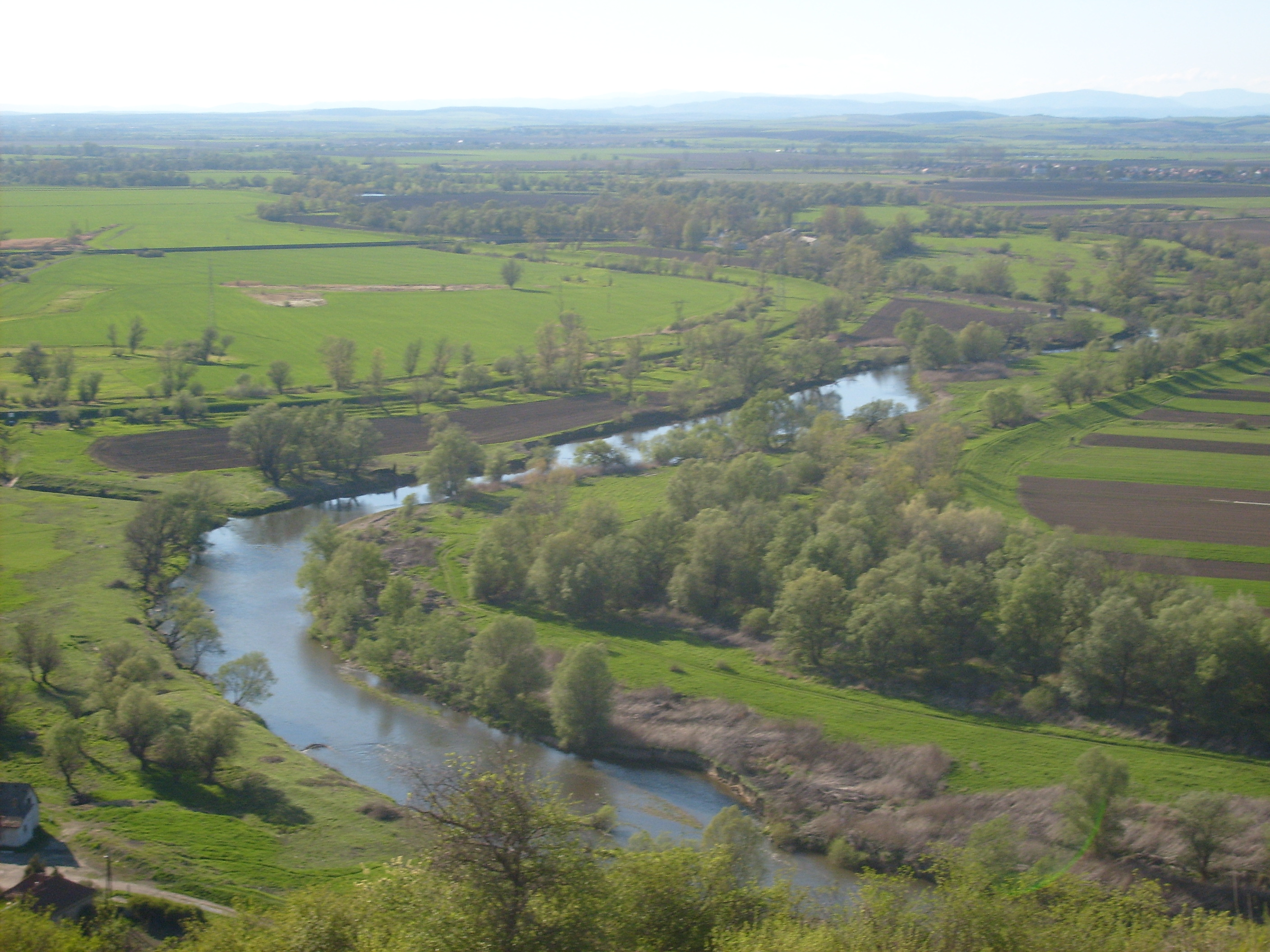
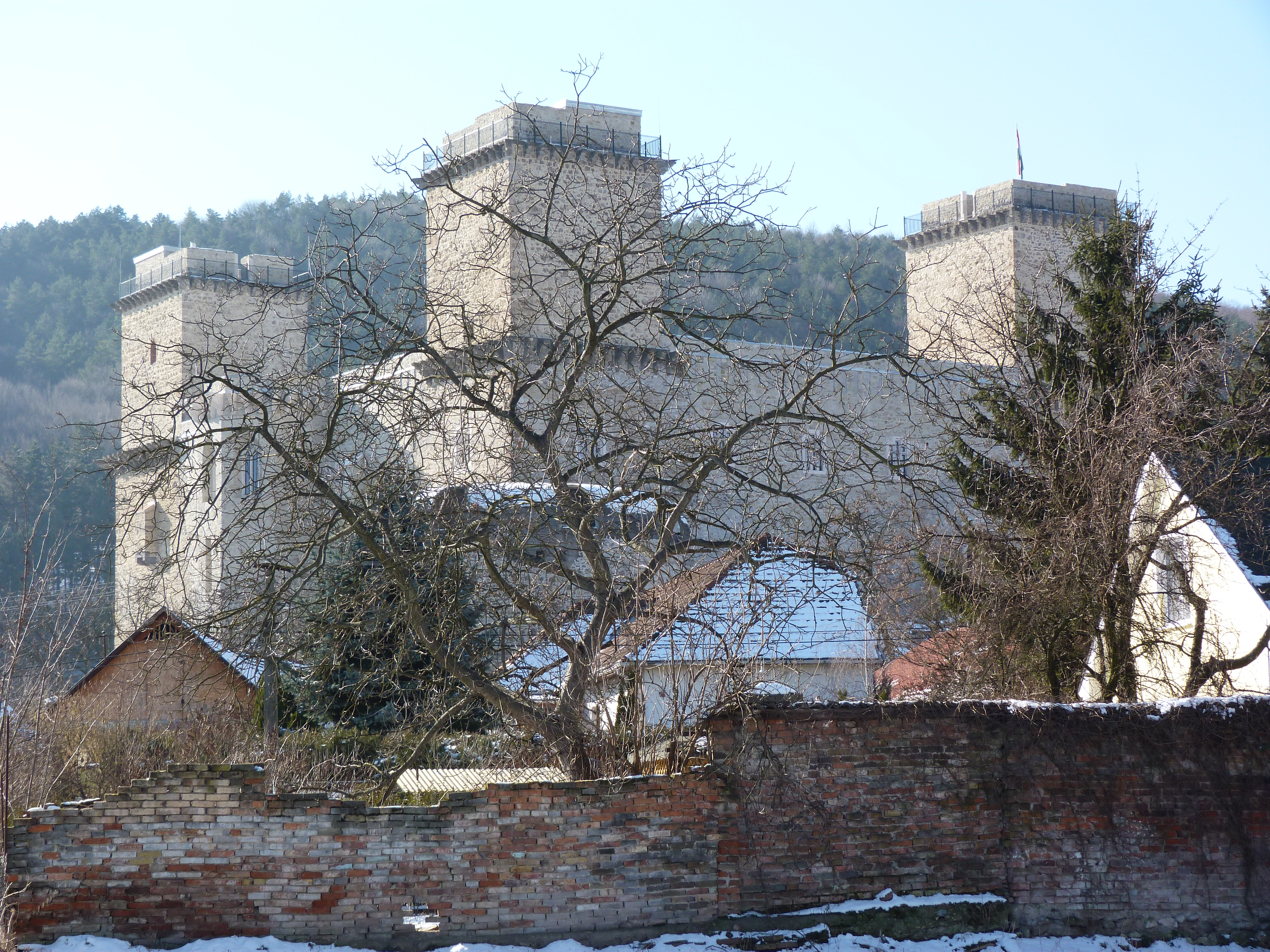
- Descending, from top: Hills near Boldogkőváralja, Sajó river near Sajónémeti, and Castle of Diósgyőr

- Flag Coat of arms

- Borsod–Abaúj–Zemplén County within Hungary
- Coordinates: 48°15′N 21°00′E
- Country: Hungary
- Region: Northern Hungary
- County seat: Miskolc
- Districts: 16 districts: Cigánd District; Edelény District; Encs District; Gönc District; Kazincbarcika District; Mezőcsát District; Mezőkövesd District; Miskolc District; Ózd District; Putnok District; Sárospatak District; Sátoraljaújhely District; Szerencs District; Szikszó District; Tiszaújváros District; Tokaj District

Government
  - President of the General Assembly: Dezső Török (Fidesz-KDNP)

Area
  - Total: 7,249.67 km^{2} (2,799.11 sq mi)
  - Rank: 2nd in Hungary

Population (2022)
  - Total: 623,024
  - Rank: 2nd in Hungary
  - Density: 85.9383/km^{2} (222.579/sq mi)

GDP
  - Total: HUF 1,672 billion €5.370 billion (2016)
- Postal code: 34xx–39xx
- Area code(s): (+36) 46, 47, 48, 49
- ISO 3166 code: HU-BZ
- Website: baz.hu

Borsod–Abaúj–Zemplén (Hungarian: Borsod-Abaúj-Zemplén megye, pronounced [ˈborʃod ˈɒbɒuːj ˈzɛmpleːn]) is an administrative county (comitatus or megye) in north-eastern Hungary (commonly called "Northern Hungary"), on the border with Slovakia (Košice Region). It shares borders with the Hungarian counties Nógrád, Heves, Hajdú–Bihar and Szabolcs–Szatmár–Bereg. The capital of Borsod–Abaúj–Zemplén county is Miskolc. Of the seven statistical regions of Hungary it belongs to the region Northern Hungary.

Borsod-Abaúj-Zemplén is the second largest county of Hungary both by area (after Bács–Kiskun) and by population (after Pest County). It is the only Hungarian county with two UNESCO World Heritage Sites (the Caves of Aggtelek Karst and Slovak Karst and the Tokaj Wine Region Historic Cultural Landscape).

== Origins and meanings of name ==
The county bears the name of three historic counties of Hungary, each of them was centered around a castle.

- Borsod is named after the castle to which it belonged. The castle was possibly named after its first steward, Bors (in old Hungarian language the -d suffix was a derivation suffix for place names, thus the name Borsod means 'place belonging to Bors.') The name Bors itself is of Hungarian origin, derived from the Turkish loan word bors, which means 'black pepper / peppercorn' or a Slavic personal name Bor(i)š, Borša. The castle itself was a motte castle, and stood near modern-day Edelény.
- Abaúj is a shortened form of the name of its castle, Abaújvár. The Aba portion refers to the Aba clan which ruled the area in the Middle Ages, while új vár means 'new castle.' The castle stood near the village of Abaújvár.
- Zemplén is named after its castle as well. The name is derived from the Slovak word zem or the Slavic zemlja, meaning 'earth, soil, ground' or 'country.' The castle, like its name indicates, was a motte with earthen walls; its remnants can still be seen near the Slovak village Zemplín.

Note that besides these three castles, there were other castles in the old counties which became the modern Borsod-Abaúj-Zemplén, such as the well-known Füzérvár.

== History ==
Borsod–Abaúj–Zemplén county was created after World War II from the pre-1938 counties Borsod–Gömör–Kishont, Abaúj–Torna and Zemplén (see also: 1950 Administrative Reform in Hungary).

=== From the Conquest until the Turkish occupation (900s–1526) ===
The historical comitatus (Hungarian: vármegye – "castle county", since each of them belonged to a castle) came into existence during the Middle Ages. Borsod county belonged to the Castle of Borsod, Abaúj belonged to the Castle of Újvár (in the modern village of Abaújvár) and Zemplén belonged to the Castle of Zemplén (today in Slovakiac

At this time the area of Borsod also included the later county Torna, and Abaúj also included the later counties Sáros and Heves. In the 12th century the former Abaúj comitatus was split into Abaúj, Heves and Sáros counties, while Torna was separated from Borsod. For the next hundreds of years the borders remained unchanged.

About two-thirds of the areas of these counties were royal property, the others were ruled by clans, for example the Miskóc clan (after whom the city of Miskolc was named). The area was inhabited mostly by castle serfs and foreign settlers (Pechenegs, Walloons, Czechs and Germans). By the 12th century more and more areas were owned by noble families and the Church. Most of Borsod was ruled by the Bors-Miskóc clan, while Abaúj was the estate of the Aba clan.

By the 14th century most of the area was owned by oligarchs. To strengthen his rule Charles Robert waged war against them. Palatine Amadé Aba (Genus Aba) was the de facto ruler of Northern Hungary. Charles Robert betrayed and defeated Amadé in the Battle of Rozgony in 1312, and also gained power over Northern Hungary.

The differences between towns and villages became important during the Anjou age of Hungary. In Borsod and Abaúj the Free Royal Town of Kassa (today's Košice, Slovakia) and Miskolc emerged as the most important towns. The Castle of Diósgyőr had its prime under Louis the Great, it was one of the favourite residences of the royal family.

In the 16th century wine growing gained more importance. Today Tokaj-Hegyalja in Zemplén is one of the most important and famous wine districts of Hungary, home of the famous Tokay wine (named after the town Tokaj, the center of the wine district).

=== From the Turkish occupation until the First World War (1526–1914) ===
After the battle of Mohács, as the Turks occupied more and more of the Southern territories of Hungary, the area of Borsod-Abaúj-Zemplén, as the northernmost part of the country, became an important area. After the Turkish occupation ended, and Hungary became part of the Habsburg monarchy, the area – because of its distance from Austria – was the main base of the resistance, and held this status until the Ausgleich ("Compromise"), when Hungary, formerly a mere province of the Empire, became an equal partner with Austria (1867). The family of Francis II Rákóczi (leader of the Revolution against Habsburg rule in the early 18th century) had estates here, and the revolution itself was organised from here.

The region also had cultural importance. The Reformation began spreading in Hungary in this area, and the first Protestant college was opened in Sárospatak. Many of the important persons of the Age of Enlightenment grew up in this region, for example the important politicians Lajos Kossuth, Bertalan Szemere and László Palóczy, and the language reformer Ferenc Kazinczy.

During the 18th century several towns bought their freedom from their feudal landowners. New guilds were formed, manufactures were built, mines were opened, glassworks and forges were built. Miskolc began to catch up with Kassa and take over the role as the leading city of the region, and because of this Borsod was the fastest developing county of the three counties. Many foreign settlers arrived, Slovaks, Greeks, Germans, Russians – even today there are whole villages with significant number of them. According to the census of 1787 Borsod, Abaúj and Zemplén had almost 500,000 inhabitants.

After the Ausgleich Northern Hungary – just like the other parts of the country – experienced an era of prosperity and fast development. New factories, railway lines were built, the population grew. In 1882 Abaúj county was merged with Torna, and was renamed Abaúj-Torna.

Furthermore, a large population of Jews was established during this time period. The famous film mogul who created Paramount Pictures, Adolph Zukor, was born in Ricse, a town in this county.

=== From 1914 to today ===
After World War I and the Treaty of Trianon Hungary had to give up its northern parts to Czechoslovakia. Abaúj-Torna had to give up 48% of its area, 72% of Zemplén became part of Czechoslovakia, only Borsod remained fully within Hungary. The neighboring county of Gömör-Kishont retained 7.5% of its area, and remaining parts were merged with Borsod. The county seats were Miskolc (Borsod-Gömör-Kishont), Szikszó (Abaúj-Torna) and Sátoraljaújhely (Zemplén).

Under the First Vienna Award, arbitrated by Nazi Germany and Fascist Italy following the Munich Agreement, Hungary re-annexed territories that had been ceded to Czechoslovakia. During World War II Kassa was the capital of Abaúj-Torna. After Allied Victory in Europe, the pre-1938 borders were reinstated. The administration of the country needed to revert to pre-war status quo, since most of the land grabs proved temporary. Hundreds of thousands of Hungarians remaining in Slovakia were forcibly expelled. In 1950 the Hungarian parts of the former counties Borsod-Gömör-Kishont, Abaúj-Torna and Zemplén were united, forming the county of Borsod-Abaúj-Zemplén, with Miskolc being the county capital.

During the Socialist era the region was developed into the centre of heavy industry. Whole new towns came into existence in place of small villages (Tiszaújváros, Kazincbarcika), the industrial character of existing cities became more important (Miskolc, Ózd). Urbanization was rapid, workers from all over the country were arriving in these cities and towns, and the population of Miskolc reached its highest level in the 1980s (around 211,000). The end of the Socialist era and the recession of the 1990s hit hard, the unemployment rate was one of the highest of the country, and the local governments tried to get over the crisis by strengthening the touristic potential. This seems to be a good idea, since Borsod-Abaúj-Zemplén is a geographically diverse area with rich natural and cultural treasures.

== Coat of arms and flag ==
The coat of arms

The county's coat of arms was created in 1991 from the coats of arms of the former counties now forming parts of Borsod-Abaúj-Zemplén. From left to right: Coat of arms of Abaúj-Torna county. – Coat of arms of Zemplén county. – Coat of arms of Borsod county. – Coat of arms of Gömör / Gömör-Kishont county (with its red background color changed to the same blue as used in the coat of arms of Abaúj).

The flag is vertically divided into two equal sections (red and blue), with the coat of arms on it, and the county's name embroidered with gold thread under the coat of arms. Its ratio is 2:1. The use of both coat of arms and flag is regulated by the county council.

== Geography ==
Borsod–Abaúj–Zemplén is one of the most geographically diverse areas of Hungary. It lies where the Northern Mountains meet the Great Hungarian Plain, thus the northern parts of the county are mountainous – with some of the highest peaks and deepest caves in the country – the southern parts are flat. The average temperature is lower than that of the country, the average humidity is higher (700–800 mm (28–31 in)/year). The region holds the country's record for lowest temperature: −35 °C (−31 °F) on 16 February 1940 in the town of Görömböly-Tapolca (now Miskolctapolca).

=== Rivers ===
- Tisza, which forms a natural border between Borsod-Abaúj-Zemplén and Szabolcs-Szatmár-Bereg countries
- Sajó, a tributary to Tisza
- Bodrog, a tributary to Tisza
- Hernád, a tributary to Sajó

=== Highest points ===
- Istállós-kő, Bükk Mountains (959 m (3,146 ft))
- Nagy-Milic, Zemplén Mountains (894 m (2,933 ft))

== Demographics ==
Historical population
Year	Pop.	±%
1870	382,264	—
1880	373,830	−2.2%
1890	408,174	+9.2%
1900	469,681	+15.1%
1910	513,193	+9.3%
1920	535,588	+4.4%
1930	585,154	+9.3%
1941	633,105	+8.2%
1949	630,621	−0.4%
1960	725,303	+15.0%
1970	779,421	+7.5%
1980	809,468	+3.9%
1990	761,963	−5.9%
2001	744,404	−2.3%
2011	686,266	−7.8%
2022	623,024	−9.2%

The population of Borsod–Abaúj–Zemplén County was 623,024 as of the 2022 Census, with a population density of 86 individuals per square kilometer (86/km^{2}). The number of households was 249,122 and the number of families was 164,073. Since the 2011 Census, the population decreased by 63,242 (-9.2%).

=== Ethnicity ===
In the 2022 Census, the vast majority (83.5%) of the population identified as Hungarian. A minority of 7.5% identified as belonging to another ethnic group and 13.0% of the population did not respond. The ethnic groups most identified with were Romani (6.0%), Slovak (0.4%), German (0.3%) and Ruthenian (0.2%). Small percentages identified as other domestic ethnic groups (0.4%) or other groups (0.2%). (Note: Individuals were able to identify with multiple ethnic groups, so the percentages may not add up to 100%.)

In the 2011 Census, 84.1% of the population identified as Hungarian. Nearly a tenth (9.8%) of the population identified as belonging to another ethnic group and 13.1% did not respond. Romani made up 8.5% of the population, German 0.4%, Slovak 0.3%, and Ruthenian (0.2%). Small percentages identified as other domestic ethnic groups (0.3%) or other groups (0.1%).

=== Religion ===
Religion in Borsod-Abaúj-Zemplén County (2022 census – of those who declared their religion (61.8%))
1. Roman Catholic (44.0%)
2. Calvinistic (26.7%)
3. Greek Catholic (7.60%)
4. Lutheran (0.70%)
5. Yehova's witnesses (0.60%)
6. Other Christian denomination (2.50%)
7. Other religion (0.30%)
8. Not religious (17.6%)

In the 2022 Census, just over half of the population (50.9%) were religious adherents. The largest religious communities were Roman Catholic (27.2%), Calvinist (16.5%), and Greek Catholic (4.7%), Lutheran (0.4%), Other Christian denomination (1.2%), and other religious affiliations (0.1%). Small percentages (less than 0.1%) were affiliated with Judaism and Orthodox Christianity. The non-religious made up 10.9% of the population. More than a third (38.2%) of the population did not respond.

In the 2011 Census, 63.0% of the population were religious adherents. Just over a third of the population was Roman Catholic (36.1%). Others included Calvinist (19.8%), Greek Catholic (5.1%), Lutheran (0.5%), Other Christian denomination (1.2%), and other religious affiliations (0.2%). Small percentages (less than 0.1%) were affiliated with Judaism and Orthodox Christianity. Atheists made up (0.8%) of the population and other non-religious made up 12.1%. Nearly a quarter (24.0%) of the population did not respond.

In 1930, the population was 51.0% Roman Catholic, 32.5% Calvinist, 8.3% Greek Catholic, 6.0% Jewish, 1.9% Lutheran, and others (0.2%).

== Regional structure ==
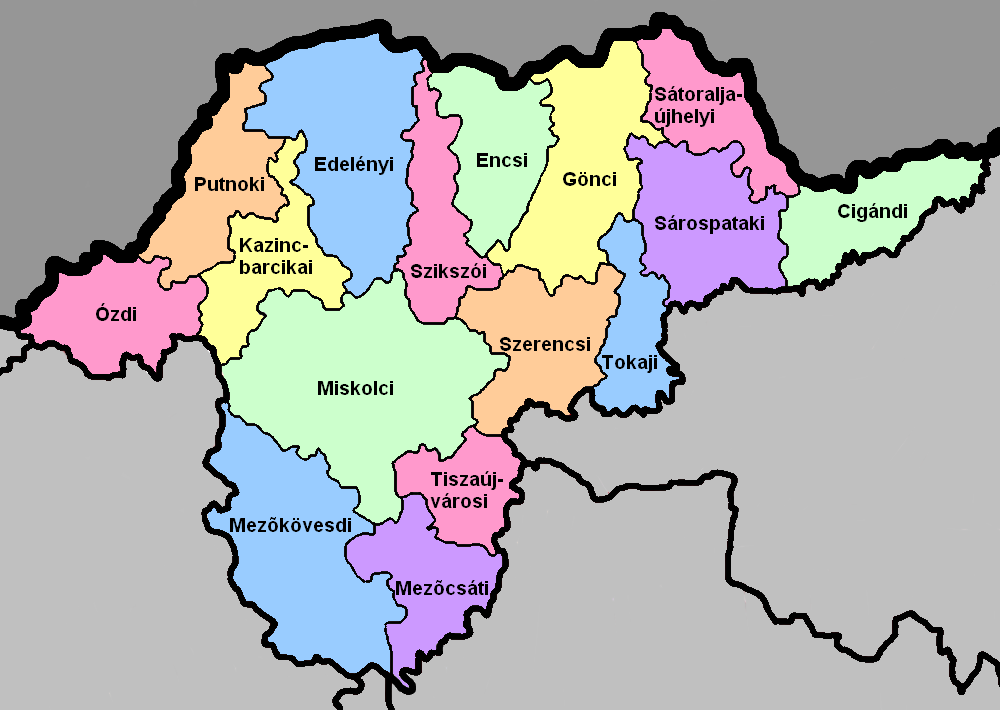
Districts of Borsod–Abaúj–Zemplén County

No.	English and Hungarian names	Area (km^{2})	Population (2022)	Density (pop./km^{2})	Seat	No. of municipalities
1	Cigánd District; Cigándi járás	389.99	14,767	38	Cigánd	15
2	Edelény District; Edelényi járás	717.86	31,615	44	Edelény	45
3	Encs District; Encsi járás	378.39	21,059	56	Encs	29
4	Gönc District; Gönci járás	549.67	15,665	28	Gönc	32
5	Kazincbarcika District; Kazincbarcikai járás	341.70	58,445	171	Kazincbarcika	22
6	Mezőcsát District; Mezőcsáti járás	351.27	13,515	38	Mezőcsát	8
7	Mezőkövesd District; Mezőkövesdi járás	723.87	38,899	54	Mezőkövesd	23
8	Miskolc District; Miskolci járás	972.80	227,095	233	Miskolc	39
9	Ózd District; Ózdi járás	385.57	49,038	127	Ózd	17
10	Putnok District; Putnoki járás	391.25	17,145	44	Putnok	26
11	Sárospatak District; Sárospataki járás	477.67	21,154	44	Sárospatak	16
12	Sátoraljaújhely District; Sátoraljaújhelyi járás	321.38	20,099	63	Sátoraljaújhely	21
13	Szerencs District; Szerencsi járás	432.07	36,715	85	Szerencs	16
14	Szikszó District; Szikszói járás	309.25	17,173	56	Szikszó	24
15	Tiszaújváros District; Tiszaújvárosi járás	248.87	29,438	118	Tiszaújváros	16
16	Tokaj District; Tokaji járás	255.81	11,202	44	Tokaj	11
Borsod-Abaúj-Zemplén County		7,249.67	623,024	86	Miskolc	358

== Economy ==
Due to the emphasis on industrialization during the former Socialist regime and the county's richness in brown coal, Borsod-Abaúj-Zemplén has become one of the leading industrial regions of the country, "the Ruhr Area of Hungary". The most important centres of heavy industry were Miskolc, Ózd, Tiszaújváros and Kazincbarcika. With the fall of the Socialist regime the industry faced a crisis, and Borsod-Abaúj-Zemplén is among the counties that have the highest rate of unemployment and also the lowest rates of GDP per capita in Hungary.

The county is the site of the Borsod Power Plant, one of the largest biomass power plants in Hungary.

== Politics ==
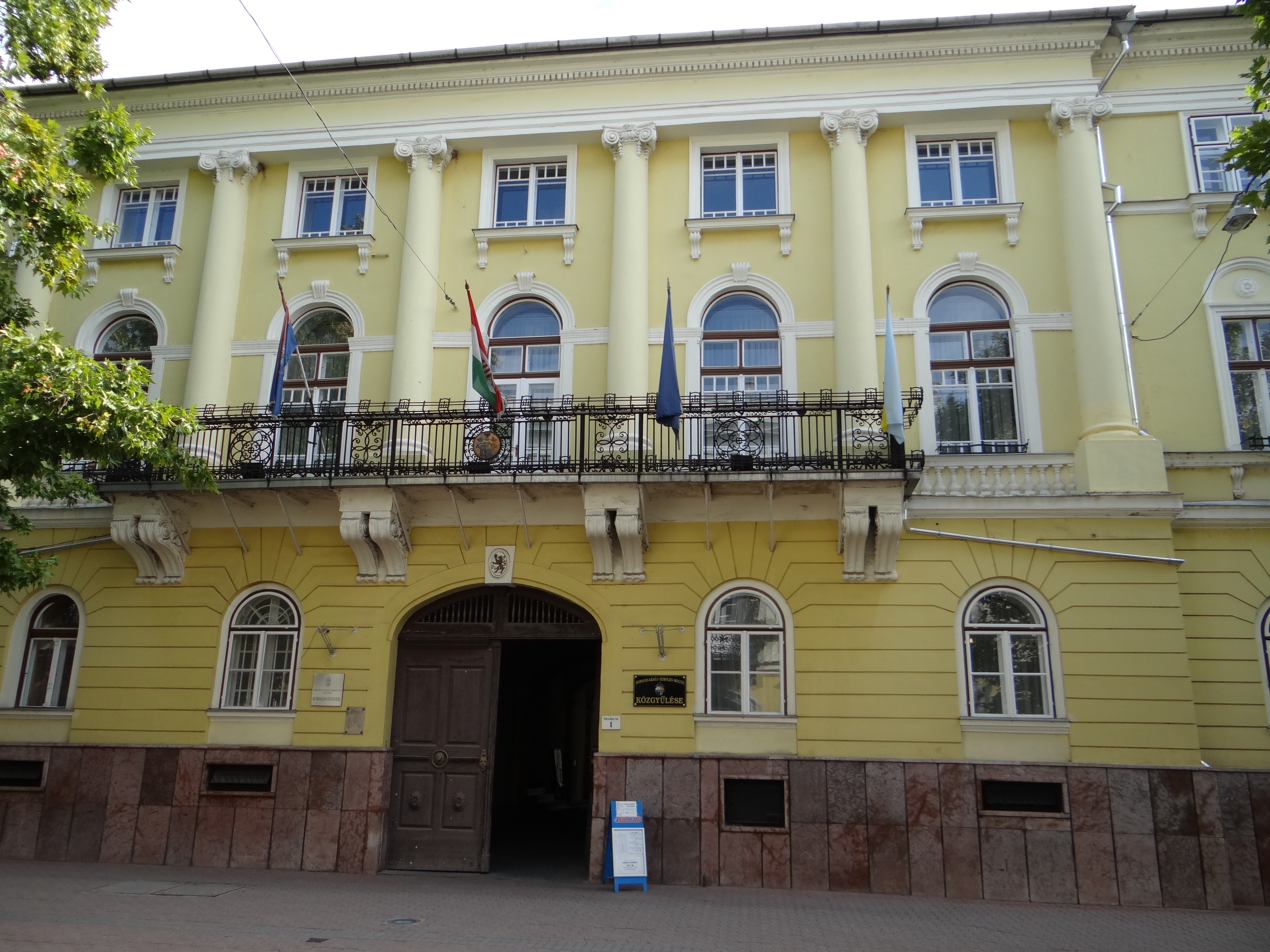
County hall of Borsod-Abaúj-Zemplén

=== County Assembly ===
The Borsod–Abaúj–Zemplén County Council, elected at the 2024 local government elections, is made up of 29 counselors, with the following party composition:

Party	Seats	Current County Assembly
Fidesz-KDNP	17	
Our Homeland Movement	5	
Democratic Coalition	3	
Momentum Movement	2	
Hungarian Socialist Party	1	

==== Presidents of the County Assembly ====
President	Terms
Dezső Török (Fidesz-KDNP)	2014–

=== Members of the National Assembly ===
The following members elected of the National Assembly during the 2022 parliamentary election:

Constituency	Member	Party
Borsod-Abaúj-Zemplén County 1st constituency	Katalin Csöbör	Fidesz–KDNP
Borsod-Abaúj-Zemplén County 2nd constituency	János Kiss	Fidesz–KDNP
Borsod-Abaúj-Zemplén County 3rd constituency	Gábor Riz	Fidesz–KDNP
Borsod-Abaúj-Zemplén County 4th constituency	Zoltán Demeter	Fidesz–KDNP
Borsod-Abaúj-Zemplén County 5th constituency	Richárd Hörcsik	Fidesz–KDNP
Borsod-Abaúj-Zemplén County 6th constituency	Zsófia Koncz	Fidesz–KDNP
Borsod-Abaúj-Zemplén County 7th constituency	András Tállai	Fidesz–KDNP

== Municipalities ==
Borsod–Abaúj–Zemplén County has 1 urban county, 27 towns, 8 large villages and 322 villages.

Borsod–Abaúj–Zemplén is the county of extremes: it is the home of the country's fourth largest city and second largest agglomeration, where one fourth of the county' population resides, on the other hand, the county is full of hamlets with population under 200. Borsod-Abaúj-Zemplén has 28 cities/towns (as of 2019) and over 300 villages. With a total of 358 cities, towns and villages this county has the most municipalities in Hungary. Approximately half of the population lives in cities/towns.

City with county rights

(ordered by population, as of 2011 census)

- Miskolc (167,754) – county seat

Towns

- Ózd (34,481)
- Kazincbarcika (29,010)
- Mezőkövesd (16,559)
- Tiszaújváros (16,500)
- Sátoraljaújhely (15,783)
- Sárospatak (12,991)
- Sajószentpéter (12,012)
- Edelény (9,986)
- Szerencs (9,198)
- Putnok (6,905)
- Felsőzsolca (6,613)
- Encs (6,344)
- Mezőcsát (5,980)
- Alsózsolca (5,766)
- Szikszó (5,631)
- Nyékládháza (5,023)
- Emőd (5,007)
- Tokaj (4,530)
- Szendrő (4,065)
- Mezőkeresztes (3,886)
- Borsodnádasd (3,169)
- Abaújszántó (3,147)
- Cigánd (2,963)
- Sajóbábony (2,887)
- Rudabánya (2,583)
- Gönc (2,059)
- Pálháza (1,061)

Villages

- Abaújalpár
- Abaújkér
- Abaújlak
- Abaújszolnok
- Abaújvár
- Abod
- Aggtelek
- Alacska
- Alsóberecki
- Alsódobsza
- Alsógagy
- Alsóregmec
- Alsószuha
- Alsótelekes
- Alsóvadász
- Arka
- Arló
- Arnót
- Aszaló
- Ároktő
- Baktakék
- Balajt
- Baskó
- Bánhorváti
- Bánréve
- Becskeháza
- Bekecs
- Berente
- Beret
- Berzék
- Bodroghalom
- Bodrogkeresztúr
- Bodrogkisfalud
- Bodrogolaszi
- Bogács
- Boldogkőújfalu
- Boldogkőváralja
- Boldva
- Borsodbóta
- Borsodgeszt
- Borsodivánka
- Borsodszentgyörgy
- Borsodszirák
- Bódvalenke
- Bódvarákó
- Bódvaszilas
- Bózsva
- Bőcs
- Bükkaranyos
- Bükkábrány
- Bükkmogyorósd
- Bükkszentkereszt
- Bükkzsérc
- Büttös
- Csenyéte
- Cserépfalu
- Cserépváralja
- Csernely
- Csincse
- Csobaj
- Csobád
- Csokvaomány
- Damak
- Dámóc
- Debréte
- Detek
- Dédestapolcsány
- Domaháza
- Dövény
- Dubicsány
- Egerlövő
- Erdőbénye
- Erdőhorváti
- Égerszög
- Fancsal
- Farkaslyuk
- Fáj
- Felsőberecki
- Felsődobsza
- Felsőgagy
- Felsőkelecsény
- Felsőnyárád
- Felsőregmec
- Felsőtelekes
- Felsővadász
- Filkeháza
- Fony
- Forró
- Fulókércs
- Füzér
- Füzérkajata
- Füzérkomlós
- Füzérradvány
- Gadna
- Gagyapáti
- Gagybátor
- Gagyvendégi
- Galvács
- Garadna
- Gelej
- Gesztely
- Gibárt
- Girincs
- Golop
- Gömörszőlős
- Göncruszka
- Györgytarló
- Halmaj
- Hangács
- Hangony
- Harsány
- Háromhuta
- Hegymeg
- Hejce
- Hejőbába
- Hejőkeresztúr
- Hejőkürt
- Hejőpapi
- Hejőszalonta
- Hercegkút
- Hernádbűd
- Hernádcéce
- Hernádkak
- Hernádkércs
- Hernádnémeti
- Hernádpetri
- Hernádszentandrás
- Hernádszurdok
- Hernádvécse
- Hét
- Hidasnémeti
- Hidvégardó
- Hollóháza
- Homrogd
- Igrici
- Imola
- Ináncs
- Irota
- Izsófalva
- Jákfalva
- Járdánháza
- Jósvafő
- Karcsa
- Karos
- Kács
- Kánó
- Kány
- Kázsmárk
- Kelemér
- Kenézlő
- Keresztéte
- Kesznyéten
- Kéked
- Királd
- Kiscsécs
- Kisgyőr
- Kishuta
- Kiskinizs
- Kisrozvágy
- Kissikátor
- Kistokaj
- Komjáti
- Komlóska
- Kondó
- Korlát
- Kovácsvágás
- Köröm
- Krasznokvajda
- Kupa
- Kurityán
- Lak
- Lácacséke
- Ládbesenyő
- Legyesbénye
- Léh
- Lénárddaróc
- Litka
- Makkoshotyka
- Martonyi
- Mád
- Mályi
- Mályinka
- Megyaszó
- Meszes
- Mezőnagymihály
- Mezőnyárád
- Mezőzombor
- Méra
- Mikóháza
- Mogyoróska
- Monaj
- Monok
- Muhi
- Múcsony
- Nagybarca
- Nagycsécs
- Nagyhuta
- Nagykinizs
- Nagyrozvágy
- Nekézseny
- Nemesbikk
- Négyes
- Novajidrány
- Nyésta
- Nyíri
- Nyomár
- Olaszliszka
- Onga
- Ormosbánya
- Oszlár
- Ónod
- Pamlény
- Parasznya
- Pácin
- Pányok
- Pere
- Perecse
- Perkupa
- Prügy
- Pusztafalu
- Pusztaradvány
- Radostyán
- Ragály
- Rakaca
- Rakacaszend
- Rásonysápberencs
- Rátka
- Regéc
- Répáshuta
- Révleányvár
- Ricse
- Rudolftelep
- Sajóecseg
- Sajógalgóc
- Sajóhídvég
- Sajóivánka
- Sajókaza
- Sajókápolna
- Sajókeresztúr
- Sajólád
- Sajólászlófalva
- Sajómercse
- Sajónémeti
- Sajóörös
- Sajópálfala
- Sajópetri
- Sajópüspöki
- Sajósenye
- Sajószöged
- Sajóvámos
- Sajóvelezd
- Sály
- Sárazsadány
- Sáta
- Selyeb
- Semjén
- Serényfalva
- Sima
- Sóstófalva
- Szakácsi
- Szakáld
- Szalaszend
- Szalonna
- Szászfa
- Szegi
- Szegilong
- Szemere
- Szendrőlád
- Szentistván
- Szentistvánbaksa
- Szin
- Szinpetri
- Szirmabesenyő
- Szomolya
- Szögliget
- Szőlősardó
- Szuhafő
- Szuhakálló
- Szuhogy
- Taktabáj
- Taktaharkány
- Taktakenéz
- Taktaszada
- Tarcal
- Tard
- Tardona
- Tállya
- Telkibánya
- Teresztenye
- Tibolddaróc
- Tiszabábolna
- Tiszacsermely
- Tiszadorogma
- Tiszakarád
- Tiszakeszi
- Tiszaladány
- Tiszalúc
- Tiszapalkonya
- Tiszatardos
- Tiszatarján
- Tiszavalk
- Tolcsva
- Tomor
- Tornabarakony
- Tornakápolna
- Tornanádaska
- Tornaszentandrás
- Tornaszentjakab
- Tornyosnémeti
- Trizs
- Sárazsadány
- Uppony
- Újcsanálos
- Vadna
- Vajdácska
- Varbó
- Varbóc
- Vatta
- Vágáshuta
- Vámosújfalu
- Vilmány
- Vilyvitány
- Viss
- Viszló
- Vizsoly
- Zalkod
- Zádorfalva
- Zemplénagárd
- Ziliz
- Zubogy
- Zsujta

municipalities are large villages.

== Tourist sights ==
=== Castles ===
- Castle of Boldogkő
- Castle Cserépvár
- Castle of Dédes
- Castle of Diósgyőr
- Castle of Füzér
- Castle of Sárospatak
- Castle of Szerencs

=== Nature ===
- Dripstone cave of Aggtelek
- Bükk National Park
- Lillafüred

== Gallery ==
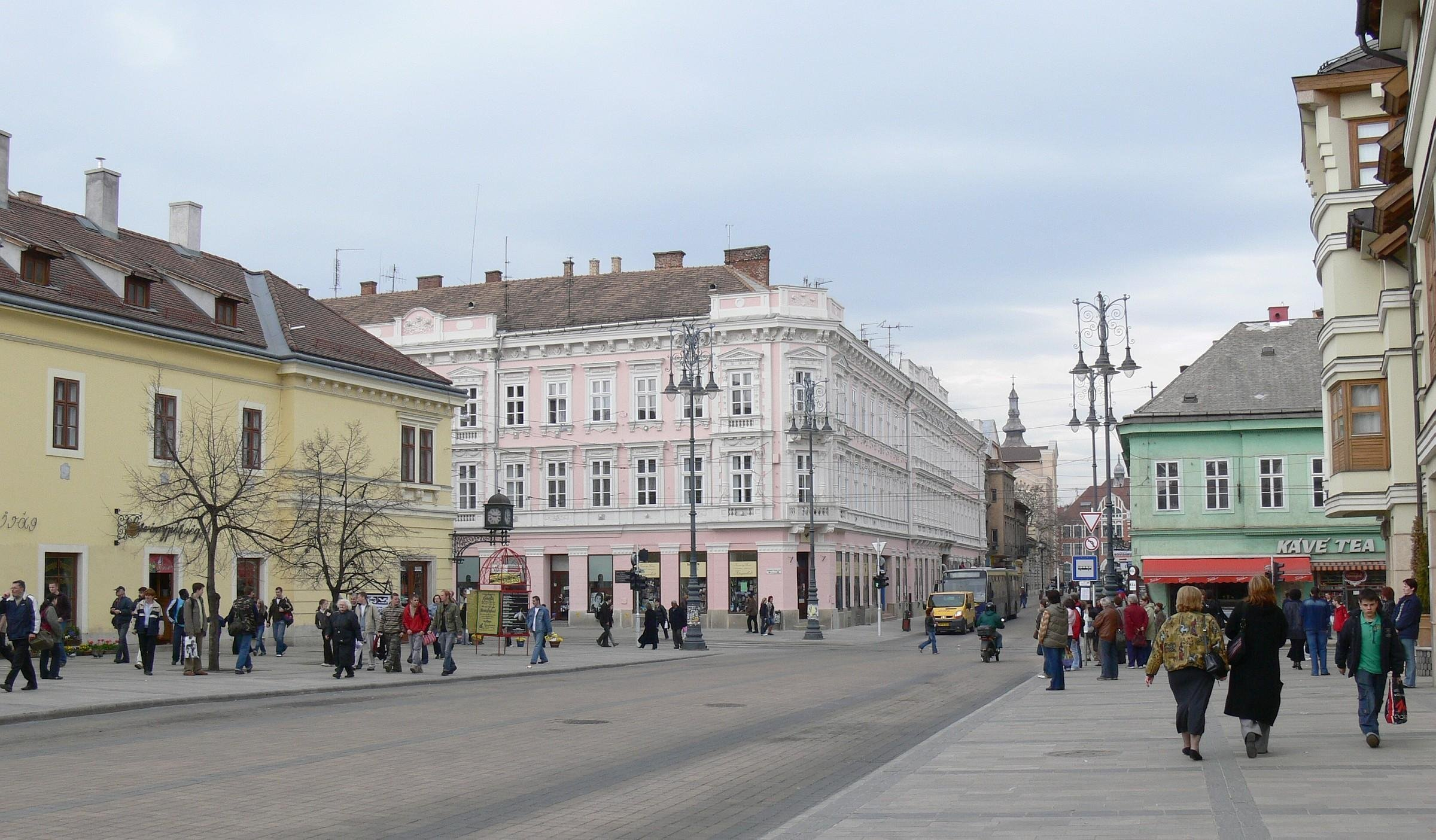
Miskolc, the capital of the county

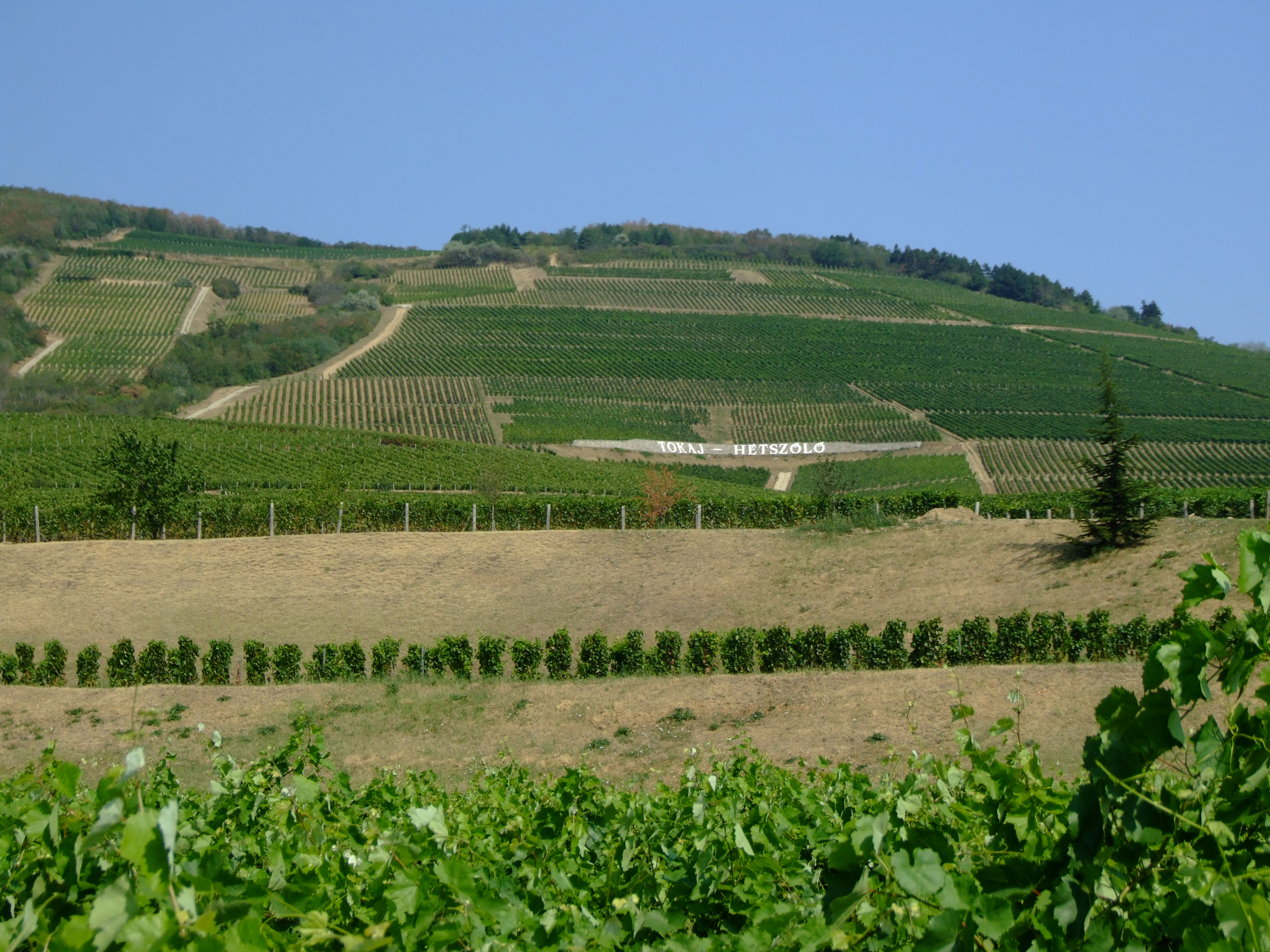
Tokaj wine region

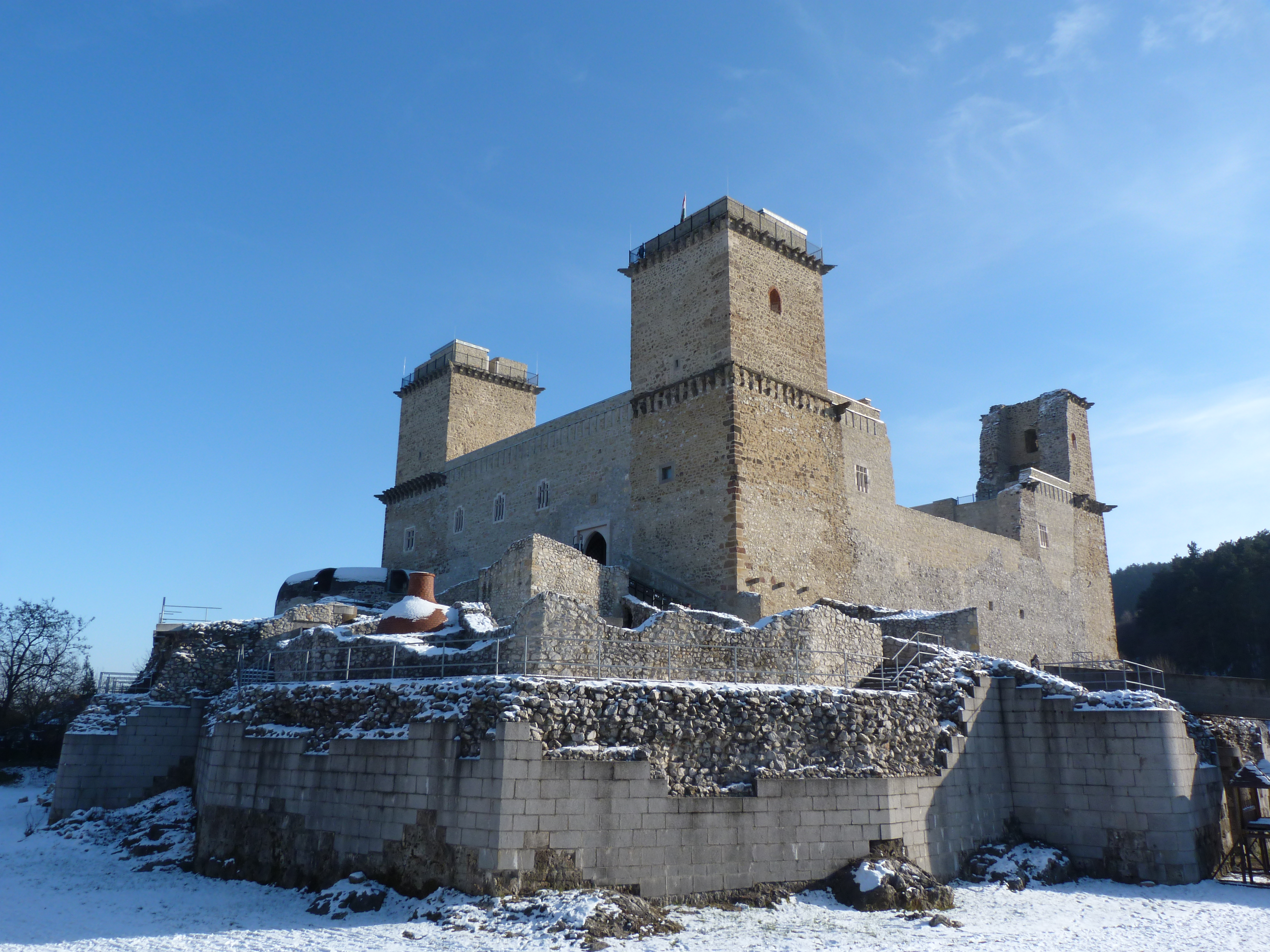
Castle of Diósgyőr

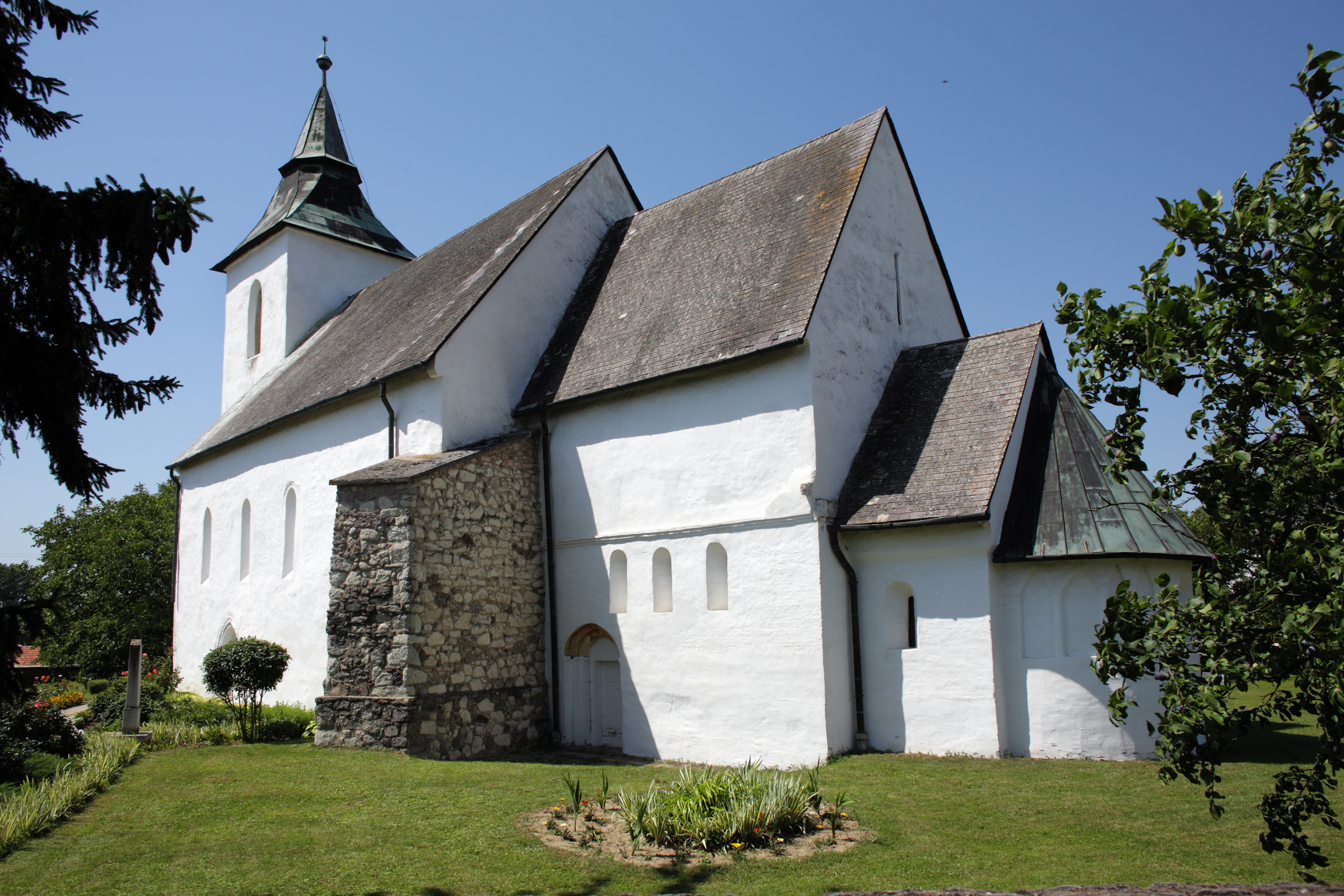
Romanesque church in Vizsoly

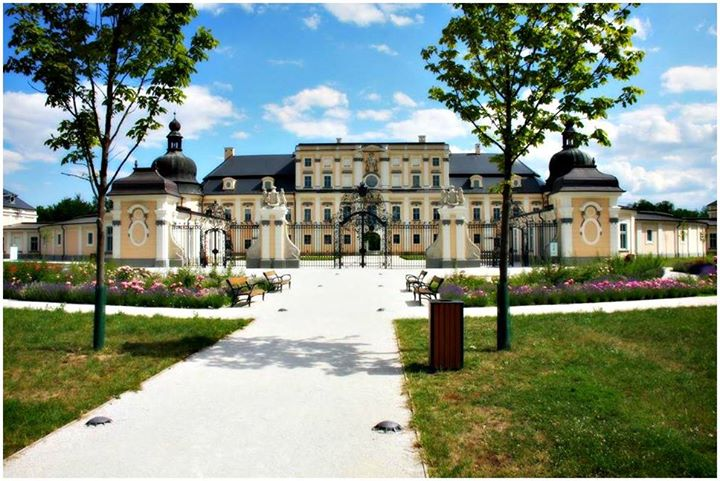
L'Huillier-Coburg Palace in Edelény

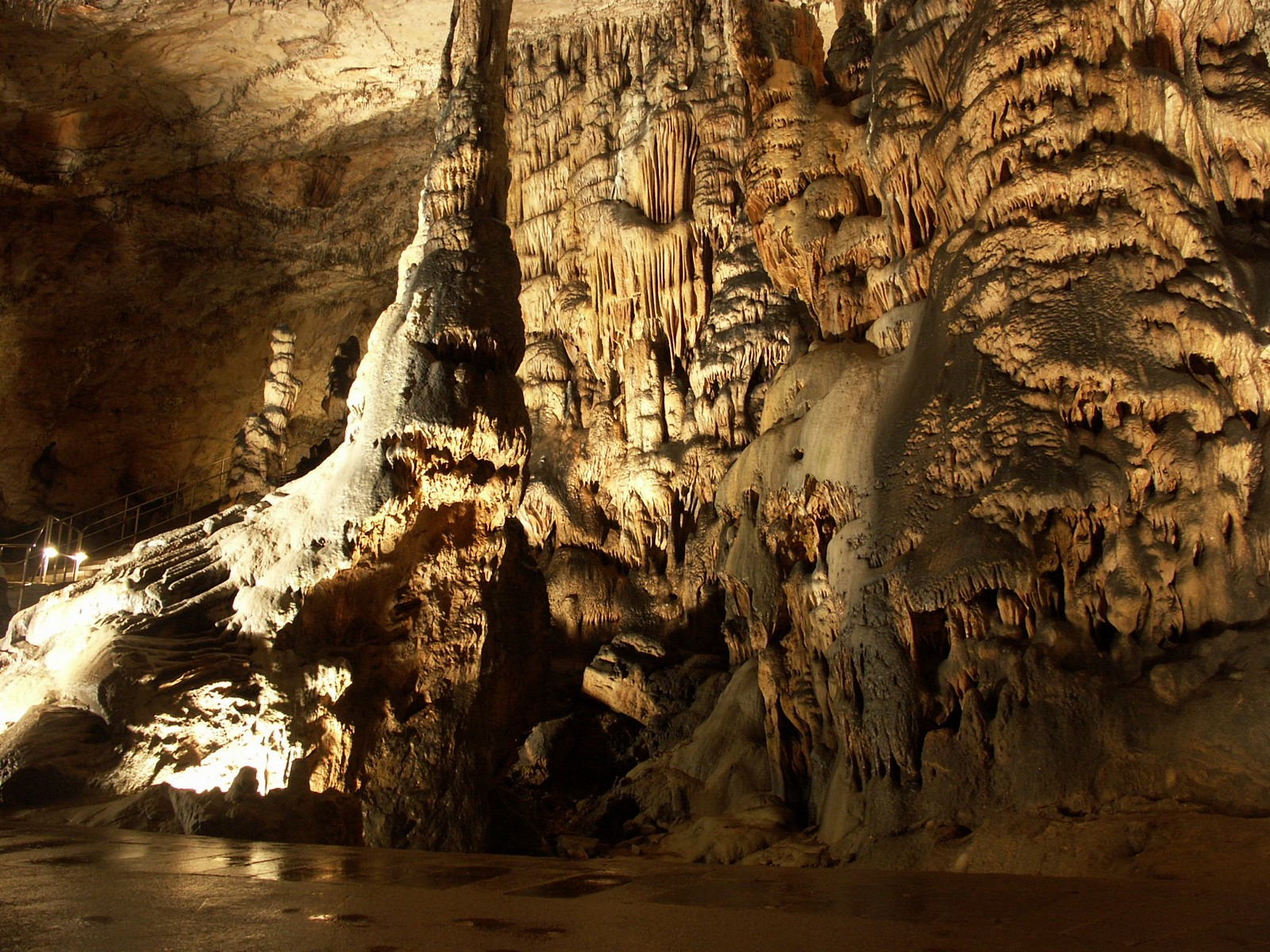
Baradla Cave in the Aggtelek National Park

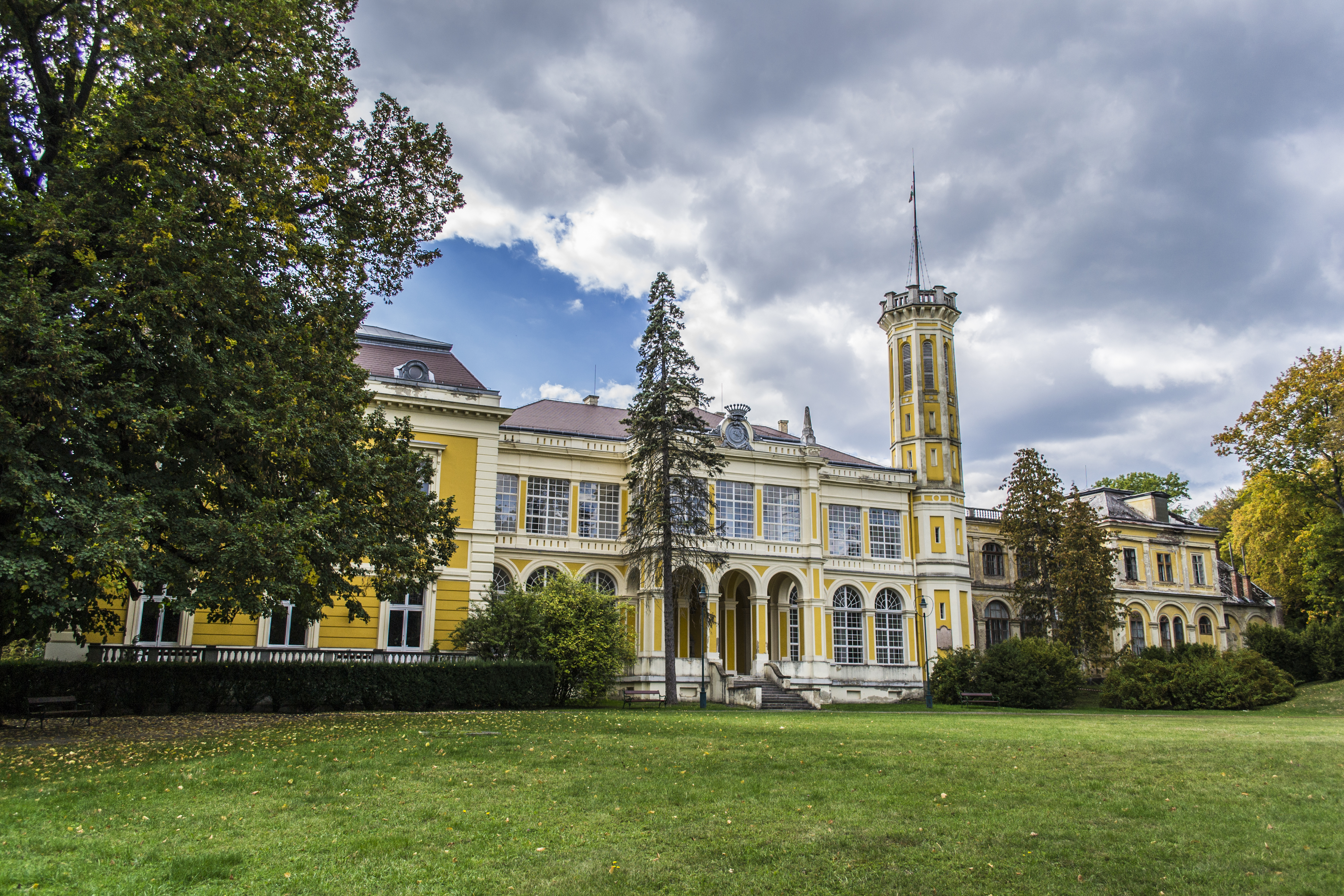
Károlyi Mansion in Füzérradvány

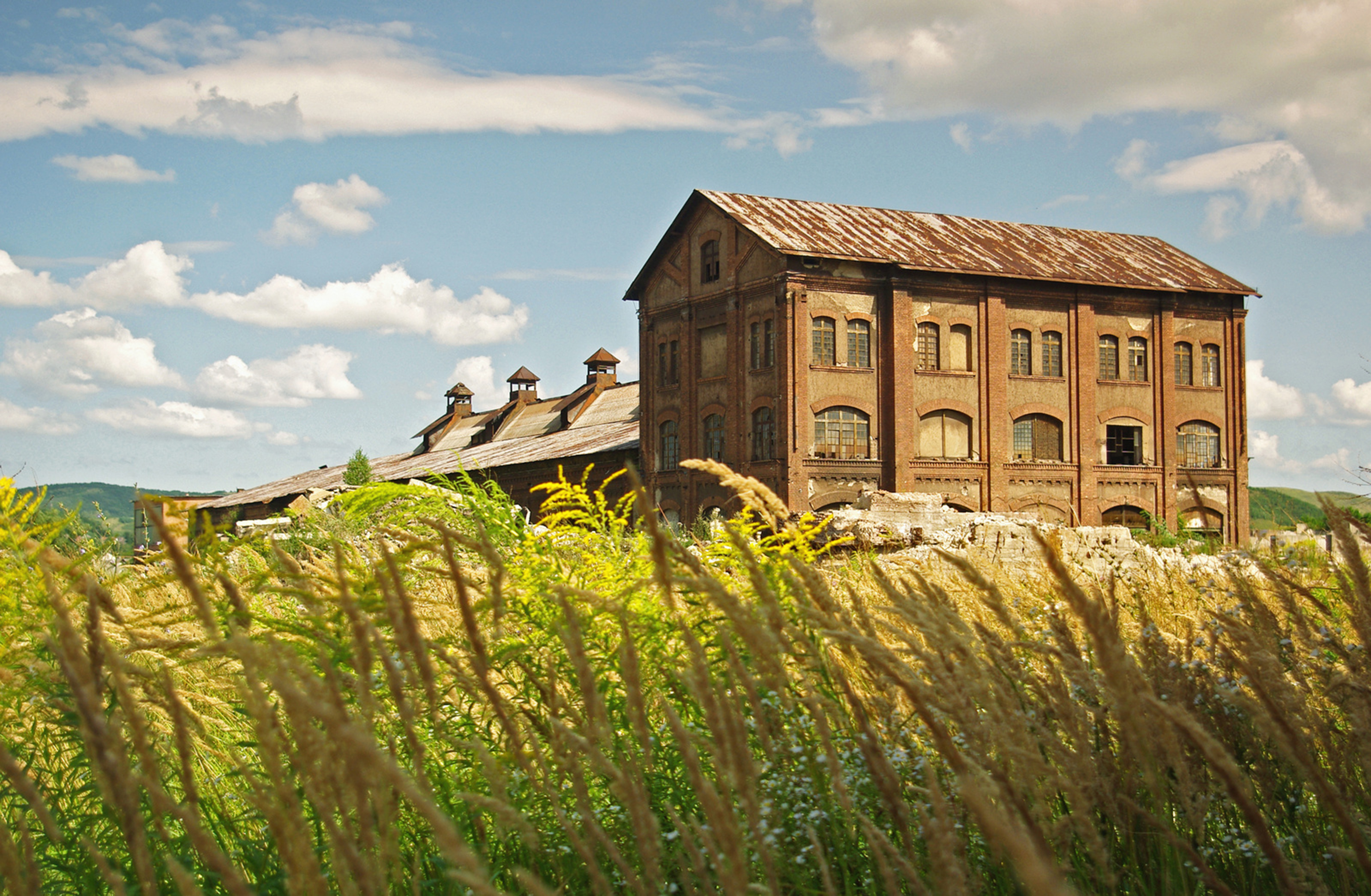
Blower Engine Room in Ózd

== International relations ==
Borsod–Abaúj–Zemplén County has a partnership relationship with:

- Harghita County, Romania
- Istanbul Province, Turkey
