= Alsóberecki =

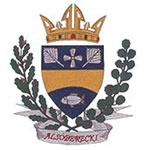
- Coat of arms

- Location of Borsod-Abaúj-Zemplén county in Hungary

- Location of Alsóberecki
- Coordinates: 48.34339°N 21.69166°E
- Country: Hungary
- County: Borsod-Abaúj-Zemplén

Area
  - Total: 6.86 km^{2} (2.65 sq mi)

Population (2015)
  - Total: 705
  - Density: 103/km^{2} (266/sq mi)
- Time zone: UTC+1 (CET)
  - Summer (DST): UTC+2 (CEST)
- Postal code: 3985
- Area code: 47

Alsóberecki is a village in Borsod-Abaúj-Zemplén county, Hungary.
