= Kupa, Hungary =

Kupa
- Location of Borsod-Abaúj-Zemplén county in Hungary

- Location of Kupa, Hungary
- Coordinates: 48.33206°N 20.91425°E
- Country: Hungary
- County: Borsod-Abaúj-Zemplén

Area
  - Total: 7.84 km^{2} (3.03 sq mi)

Population (2004)
  - Total: 187
  - Density: 23.85/km^{2} (61.8/sq mi)
- Time zone: UTC+1 (CET)
  - Summer (DST): UTC+2 (CEST)
- Postal code: 3813
- Area code: 46

Kupa is a village in Borsod-Abaúj-Zemplén county, Hungary.
