= Hernádpetri =

Coordinates: 48°29′N 21°10′E

- Village
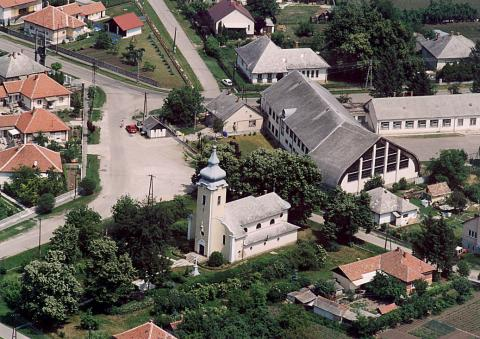

- Seal
- Interactive map of Hernádpetri
- Country: Hungary
- Regions: Northern Hungary
- County: Borsod-Abaúj-Zemplén County
- Time zone: UTC+1 (CET)
  - Summer (DST): UTC+2 (CEST)

Hernádpetri is a village in Borsod-Abaúj-Zemplén County in northeastern Hungary.
