= Tiszakarád =

- Coat of arms

- Location of Borsod-Abaúj-Zemplén county in Hungary

- Location of Tiszakarád
- Coordinates: 48.122041°N 21.434102°E
- Country: Hungary
- County: Borsod-Abaúj-Zemplén

Government
  - Mayor: Karászi Zoltán (Ind.)

Area
  - Total: 47.56 km^{2} (18.36 sq mi)

Population (2022)
  - Total: 2,226
  - Density: 46.80/km^{2} (121.2/sq mi)
- Time zone: UTC+1 (CET)
  - Summer (DST): UTC+2 (CEST)
- Postal code: 3971
- Area code: 47

Tiszakarád is a village in Borsod-Abaúj-Zemplén county, Hungary.
