= Hejőkeresztúr =

- Location of Borsod-Abaúj-Zemplén county in Hungary

- Location of Hejőkeresztúr
- Coordinates: 47.96325°N 20.87672°E
- Country: Hungary
- County: Borsod-Abaúj-Zemplén

Area
  - Total: 10.28 km^{2} (3.97 sq mi)

Population (2004)
  - Total: 1,063
  - Density: 103.4/km^{2} (268/sq mi)
- Time zone: UTC+1 (CET)
  - Summer (DST): UTC+2 (CEST)
- Postal code: 3597
- Area code: 46

Hejőkeresztúr is a village in Borsod-Abaúj-Zemplén county, Hungary.
