= Révleányvár =

Coordinates: 48°19′N 22°03′E

- Village
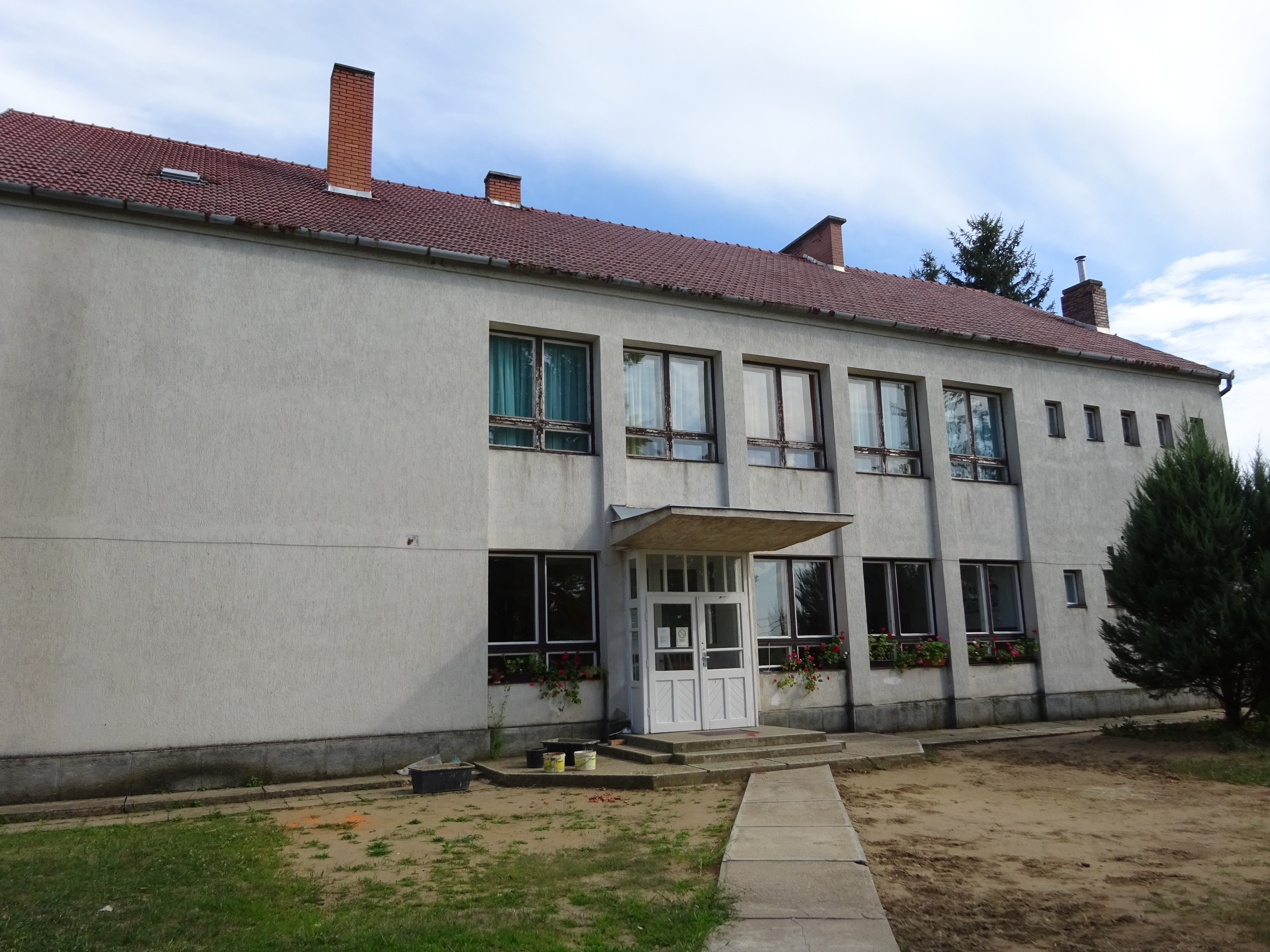
- Revleanyvar School
- Interactive map of Révleányvár
- Country: Hungary
- Regions: Northern Hungary
- County: Borsod-Abaúj-Zemplén County
- Time zone: UTC+1 (CET)
  - Summer (DST): UTC+2 (CEST)

Révleányvár is a village in Borsod-Abaúj-Zemplén County in northeastern Hungary.
