= Alacska =

Village in Hungary

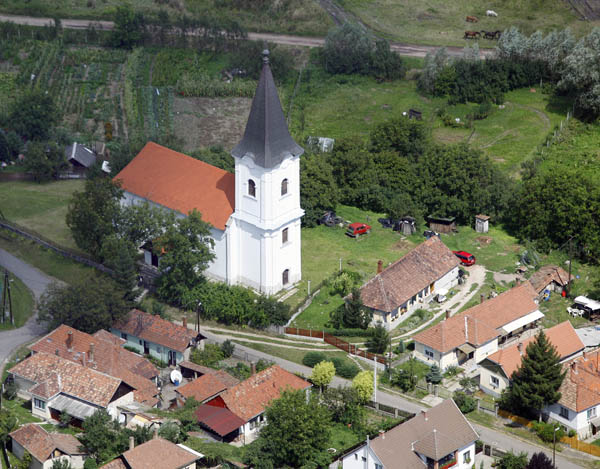

- Coat of arms

- Location of Borsod-Abaúj-Zemplén county in Hungary

- Location of Alacska
- Coordinates: 48.21623°N 20.64948°E
- Country: Hungary
- County: Borsod-Abaúj-Zemplén

Area
  - Total: 8.55 km^{2} (3.30 sq mi)

Population (2015)
  - Total: 778
  - Density: 91.0/km^{2} (236/sq mi)
- Time zone: UTC+1 (CET)
  - Summer (DST): UTC+2 (CEST)
- Postal code: 3779
- Area code: 48

Alacska is a village in Borsod-Abaúj-Zemplén county, Hungary.

A few Jews lived in the village and there are the remains of a Jewish cemetery.
