= Büttös =

- Seal

- Location of Borsod-Abaúj-Zemplén county in Hungary

- Location of Büttös
- Coordinates: 48.47885°N 21.00977°E
- Country: Hungary
- County: Borsod-Abaúj-Zemplén

Area
  - Total: 18.18 km^{2} (7.02 sq mi)

Population (2004)
  - Total: 229
  - Density: 12.59/km^{2} (32.6/sq mi)
- Time zone: UTC+1 (CET)
  - Summer (DST): UTC+2 (CEST)
- Postal code: 3821
- Area code: 46

Büttös (Rusyn: Будош) is a village in Borsod-Abaúj-Zemplén county, Hungary.
