= Csobaj =

- Coat of arms

- Location of Borsod-Abaúj-Zemplén county in Hungary

- Location of Csobaj
- Coordinates: 48.048961°N 21.335769°E
- Country: Hungary
- County: Borsod-Abaúj-Zemplén

Government
  - Mayor: Ivanics Imre András (Ind.)

Area
  - Total: 19.61 km^{2} (7.57 sq mi)

Population (2022)
  - Total: 609
  - Density: 31.1/km^{2} (80.4/sq mi)
- Time zone: UTC+1 (CET)
  - Summer (DST): UTC+2 (CEST)
- Postal code: 3927
- Area code: 47

Csobaj is a village in Borsod-Abaúj-Zemplén county, Hungary.
