= Monaj =

- Location of Borsod-Abaúj-Zemplén county in Hungary

- Location of Monaj
- Coordinates: 48.30689°N 20.93578°E
- Country: Hungary
- County: Borsod-Abaúj-Zemplén

Area
  - Total: 11.53 km^{2} (4.45 sq mi)

Population (2004)
  - Total: 296
  - Density: 25.67/km^{2} (66.5/sq mi)
- Time zone: UTC+1 (CET)
  - Summer (DST): UTC+2 (CEST)
- Postal code: 3812
- Area code: 46

Monaj is a village in Borsod-Abaúj-Zemplén county, Hungary.
