= Nyomár =

Coordinates: 48°17′N 20°49′E

- Village
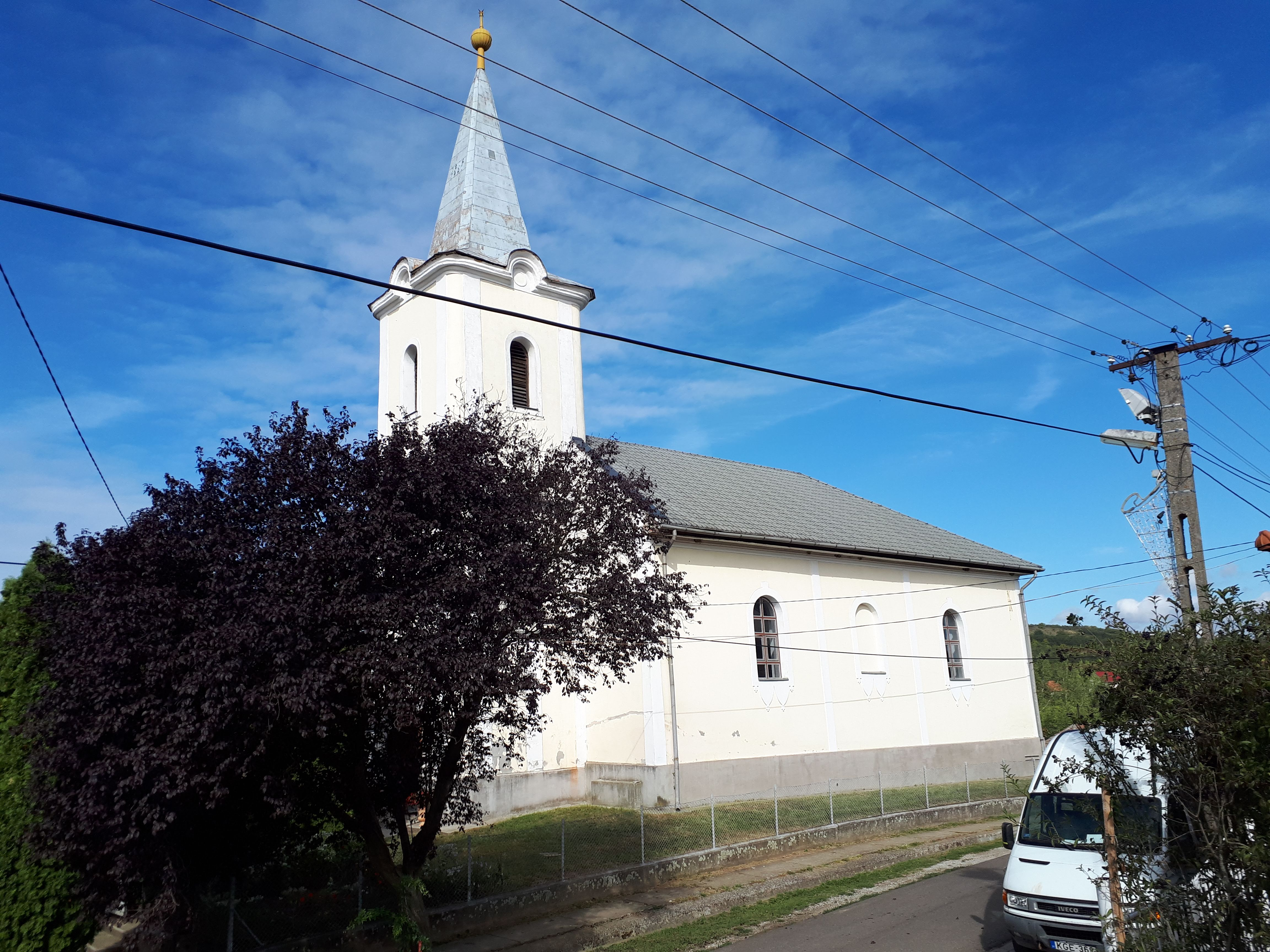
- Nyomári Reformed Church
- Interactive map of Nyomár
- Country: Hungary
- Regions: Northern Hungary
- County: Borsod-Abaúj-Zemplén County

Area
  - Total: 10.46 km^{2} (4.04 sq mi)
- Time zone: UTC+1 (CET)
  - Summer (DST): UTC+2 (CEST)

Nyomár is a village in Borsod-Abaúj-Zemplén County in northeastern Hungary.
