= Gibárt =

- Location of Borsod-Abaúj-Zemplén county in Hungary

- Location of Gibárt
- Coordinates: 48.3155°N 21.16048°E
- Country: Hungary
- County: Borsod-Abaúj-Zemplén

Government
  - Mayor: Soltész István (Fidesz-KDNP)

Area
  - Total: 5.33 km^{2} (2.06 sq mi)

Population (2022)
  - Total: 334
  - Density: 62.7/km^{2} (162/sq mi)
- Time zone: UTC+1 (CET)
  - Summer (DST): UTC+2 (CEST)
- Postal code: 3854
- Area code: 46

Gibárt is a village in Borsod-Abaúj-Zemplén county, Hungary.
