= Felsőgagy =

Village in Northern Hungary

- Village
- Location within Hungary
- Coordinates: 48°25′57.61″N 21°1′0.01″E
- Country: Hungary
- Regions: Northern Hungary
- County: Borsod-Abaúj-Zemplén County

Area
  - Total: 14.47 km^{2} (5.59 sq mi)

Population (2008)
  - Total: 161
- Time zone: UTC+1 (CET)
  - Summer (DST): UTC+2 (CEST)

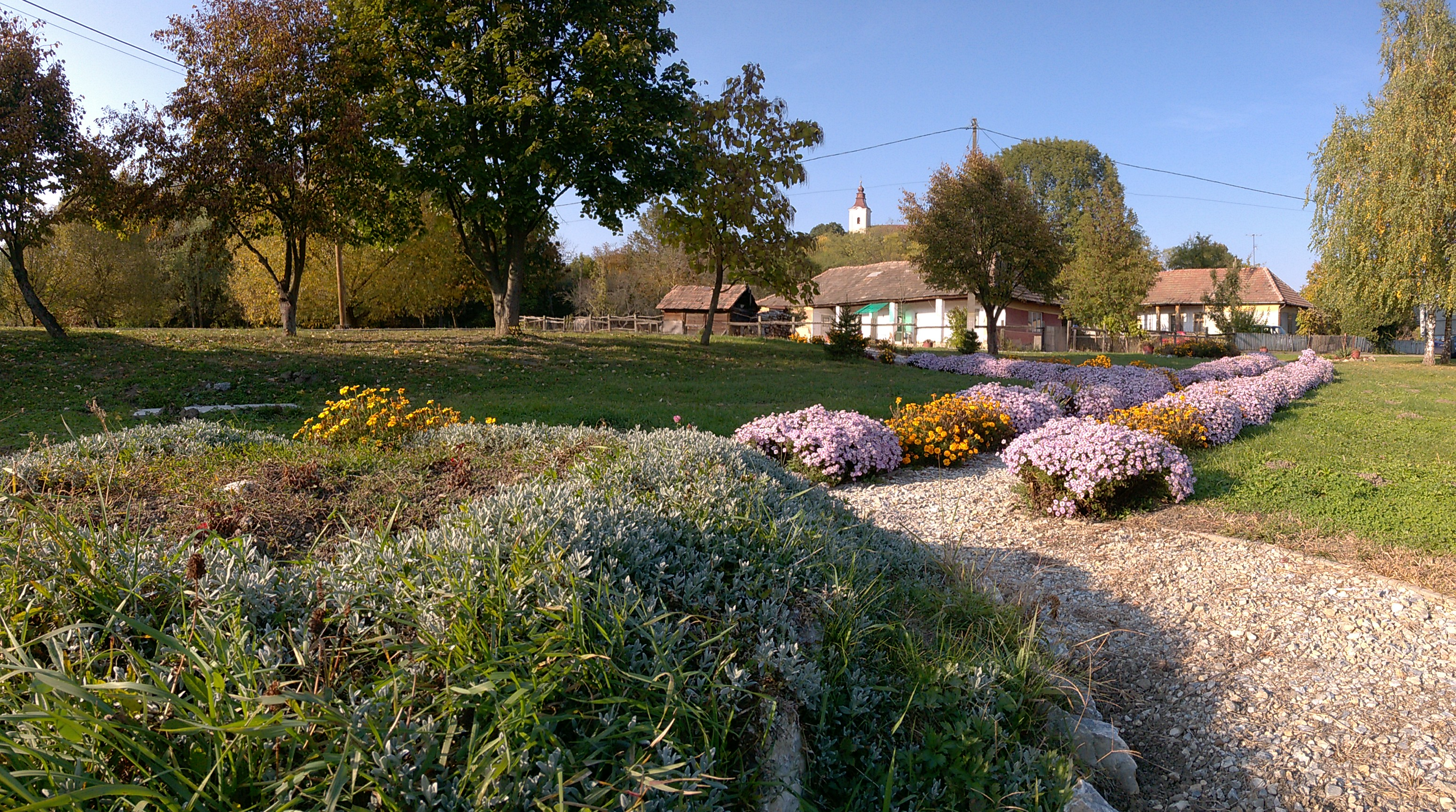

Felsőgagy is a village in Borsod-Abaúj-Zemplén County in northeastern Hungary. As of 2008, the town had a population of 161.
