= Léh =

Coordinates: 48°17′N 20°59′E

- Village
- Interactive map of Léh
- Country: Hungary
- Regions: Northern Hungary
- County: Borsod-Abaúj-Zemplén County

Government

Area
  - Total: 845 km^{2} (326 sq mi)

Population (2015)
  - Total: 401
- Time zone: UTC+1 (CET)
  - Summer (DST): UTC+2 (CEST)

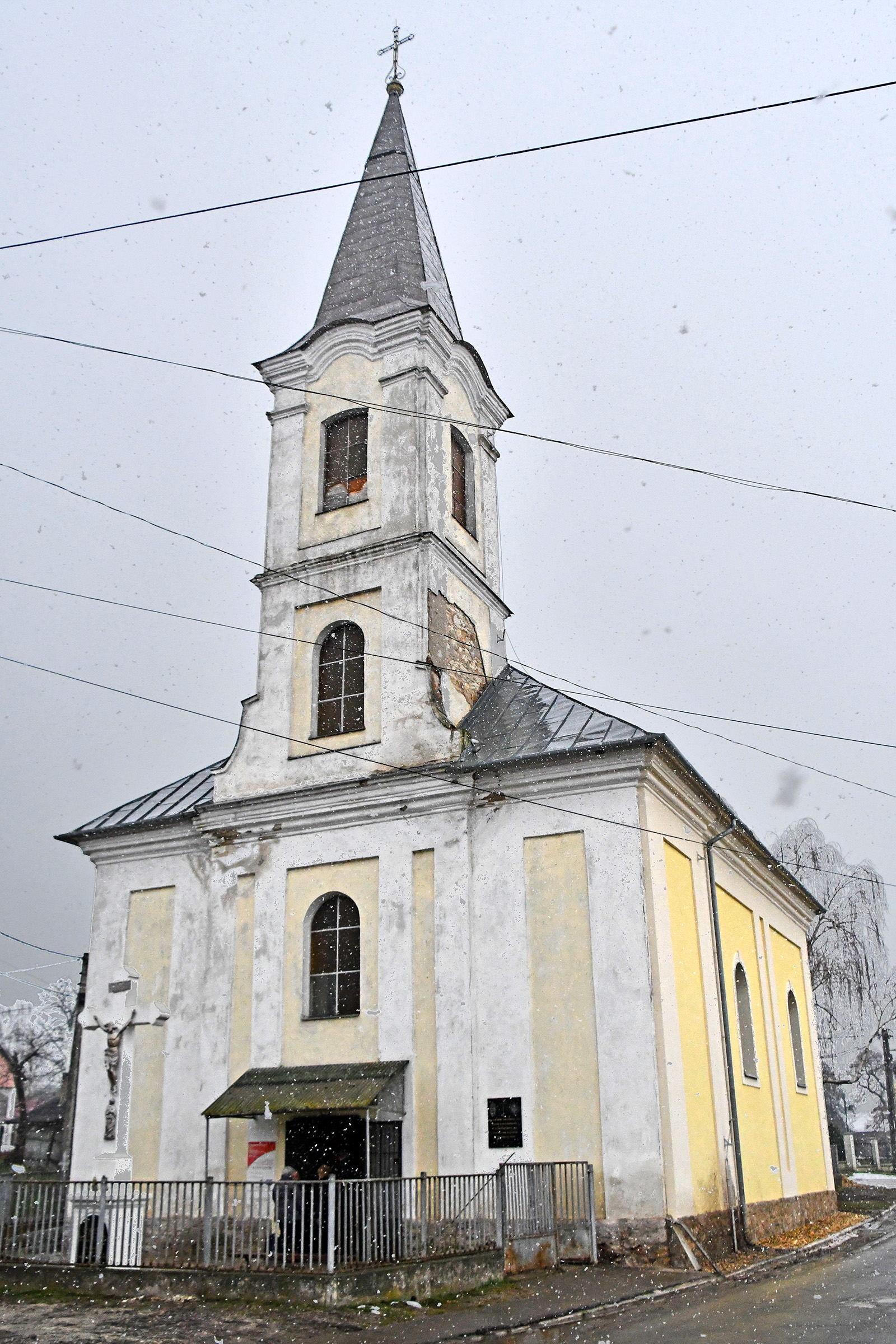
Roman Catholic Church in Léh

Léh is a village in Borsod-Abaúj-Zemplén County in northeastern Hungary.
