= Hernádkércs =

Coordinates: 48°15′N 21°03′E

- Village
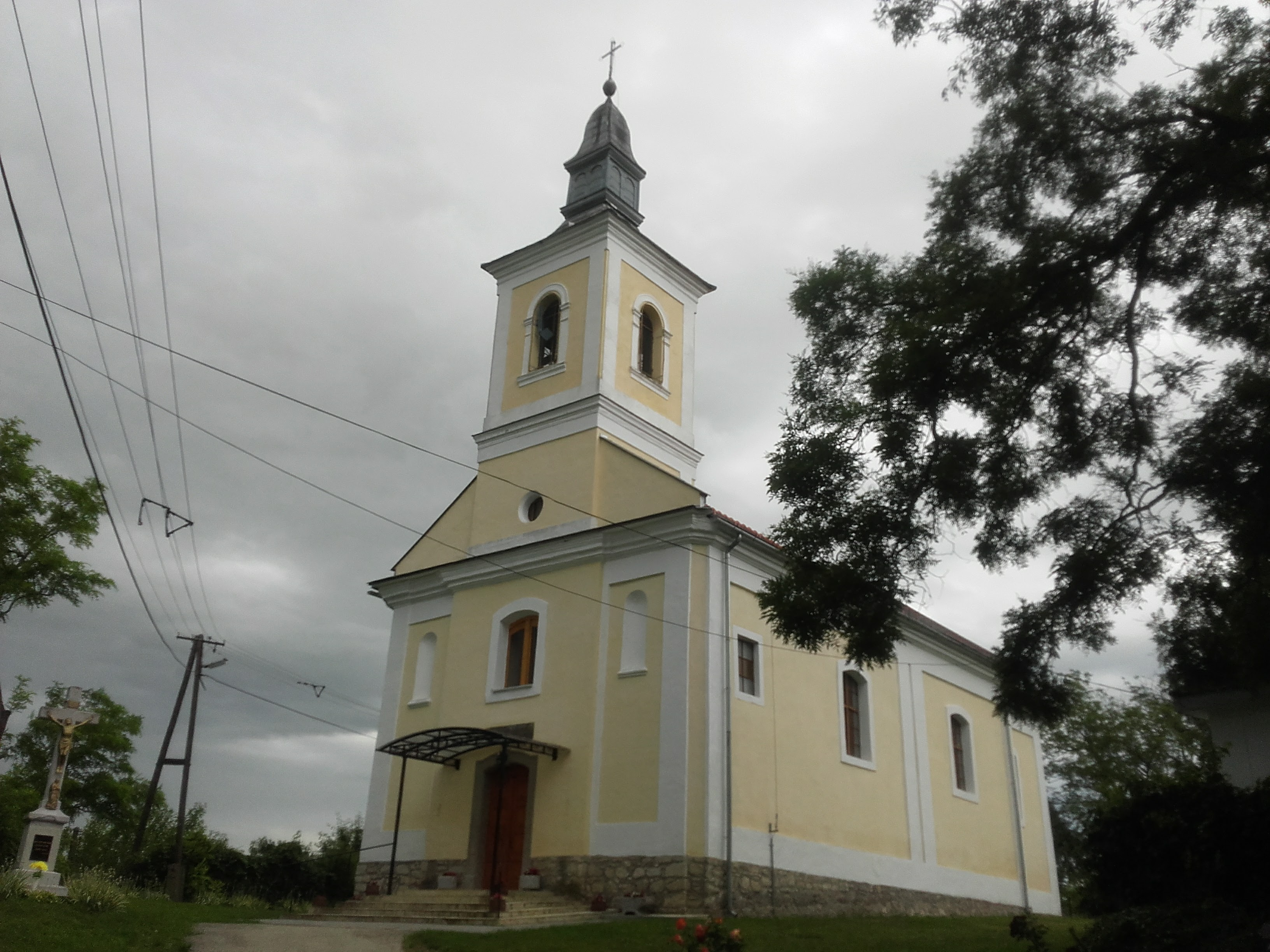
- Hernádkércs church
- Interactive map of Hernádkércs
- Country: Hungary
- Regions: Northern Hungary
- County: Borsod-Abaúj-Zemplén County
- Time zone: UTC+1 (CET)
  - Summer (DST): UTC+2 (CEST)

Hernádkércs is a village in Borsod-Abaúj-Zemplén County in northeastern Hungary.
