= Detek =

- Location of Borsod-Abaúj-Zemplén county in Hungary

- Location of Detek
- Coordinates: 48.33333°N 21.01662°E
- Country: Hungary
- County: Borsod-Abaúj-Zemplén

Area
  - Total: 9.68 km^{2} (3.74 sq mi)

Population (2004)
  - Total: 313
  - Density: 32.33/km^{2} (83.7/sq mi)
- Time zone: UTC+1 (CET)
  - Summer (DST): UTC+2 (CEST)
- Postal code: 3834
- Area code: 46

Detek is a village in Borsod-Abaúj-Zemplén county, Hungary.

== Etymology ==
The name comes from Slavic personal name Dědek ("grandfather" or "elder", similar place names are e.g. Dědek and Dědkov in the Czech Republic). Terra Detk (1247).
