= Hernádbűd =

Coordinates: 48°18′N 21°08′E

- Village
- Coat of arms
- Interactive map of Hernádbűd
- Country: Hungary
- Regions: Northern Hungary
- County: Borsod-Abaúj-Zemplén County
- Time zone: UTC+1 (CET)
  - Summer (DST): UTC+2 (CEST)

Hernádbűd is a village in Borsod-Abaúj-Zemplén County in northeastern Hungary.

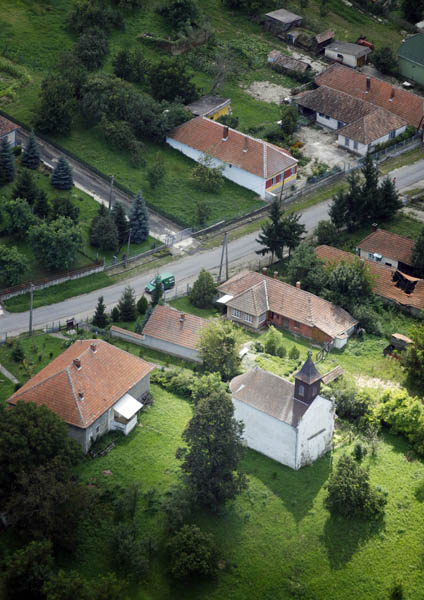

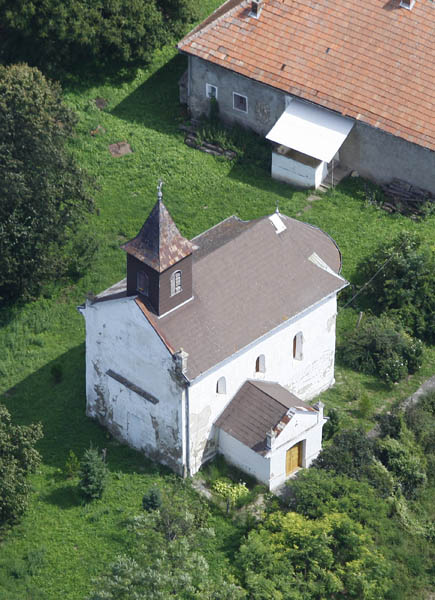

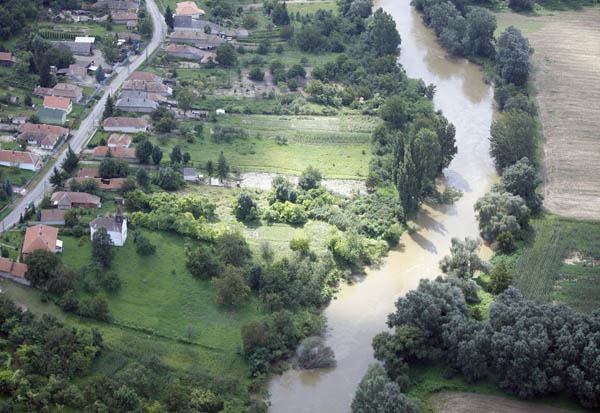
