= Trizs =

- Location of Borsod-Abaúj-Zemplén county in Hungary

- Location of Trizs
- Coordinates: 48.42573°N 20.49547°E
- Country: Hungary
- County: Borsod-Abaúj-Zemplén

Area
  - Total: 10.25 km^{2} (3.96 sq mi)

Population (2004)
  - Total: 258
  - Density: 25.17/km^{2} (65.2/sq mi)
- Time zone: UTC+1 (CET)
  - Summer (DST): UTC+2 (CEST)
- Postal code: 3724
- Area code: 48

Trizs is a village in Borsod-Abaúj-Zemplén county, Hungary.
