= Dövény =

- Village
- Seal

- Location within Hungary
- Coordinates: 48°20′51.54″N 20°32′36.1″E
- Country: Hungary
- Regions: Northern Hungary
- County: Borsod-Abaúj-Zemplén County

Area
  - Total: 11.65 km^{2} (4.50 sq mi)

Population (2008)
  - Total: 289
- Time zone: UTC+1 (CET)
  - Summer (DST): UTC+2 (CEST)

Dövény is a village in Borsod-Abaúj-Zemplén County in northeastern Hungary. As of 2008 it had a population of 289.
