= Györgytarló =

- Seal

- Location of Borsod-Abaúj-Zemplén county in Hungary

- Location of Györgytarló
- Coordinates: 48.20484°N 21.63330°E
- Country: Hungary
- County: Borsod-Abaúj-Zemplén

Area
  - Total: 30.19 km^{2} (11.66 sq mi)

Population (2004)
  - Total: 593
  - Density: 19.64/km^{2} (50.9/sq mi)
- Time zone: UTC+1 (CET)
  - Summer (DST): UTC+2 (CEST)
- Postal code: 3954
- Area code: 47

Györgytarló is a village in Borsod-Abaúj-Zemplén county, Hungary.
