= Hegymeg =

- Seal

- Location of Borsod-Abaúj-Zemplén county in Hungary

- Location of Hegymeg
- Coordinates: 48.33185°N 20.86042°E
- Country: Hungary
- County: Borsod-Abaúj-Zemplén

Area
  - Total: 5.7 km^{2} (2.2 sq mi)

Population (2004)
  - Total: 105
  - Density: 18.42/km^{2} (47.7/sq mi)
- Time zone: UTC+1 (CET)
  - Summer (DST): UTC+2 (CEST)
- Postal code: 3786
- Area code: 48

Hegymeg is a village in Borsod-Abaúj-Zemplén county, Hungary. In November 2020, two intruders beat a 94-year-old woman to death for her money and then one of them raped her as she lay dead.
