= Tiszatardos =

- Location of Borsod-Abaúj-Zemplén county in Hungary

- Location of Tiszatardos
- Coordinates: 48.04043°N 21.37932°E
- Country: Hungary
- County: Borsod-Abaúj-Zemplén

Area
  - Total: 8.93 km^{2} (3.45 sq mi)

Population (2004)
  - Total: 247
  - Density: 27.65/km^{2} (71.6/sq mi)
- Time zone: UTC+1 (CET)
  - Summer (DST): UTC+2 (CEST)
- Postal code: 3928
- Area code: 47

Tiszatardos is a village in Borsod-Abaúj-Zemplén county, Hungary.
