= Alsógagy =

- Location of Borsod-Abaúj-Zemplén county in Hungary

- Location of Alsógagy
- Coordinates: 48.40599°N 21.02543°E
- Country: Hungary
- County: Borsod-Abaúj-Zemplén

Area
  - Total: 6.28 km^{2} (2.42 sq mi)

Population (2004)
  - Total: 110
  - Density: 17.51/km^{2} (45.4/sq mi)
- Time zone: UTC+1 (CET)
  - Summer (DST): UTC+2 (CEST)
- Postal code: 3837
- Area code: 46

Alsógagy (Rusyn: Долні Ґадь) is a village in Borsod-Abaúj-Zemplén county, Hungary.
