= Gadna (village) =

- Location of Borsod-Abaúj-Zemplén county in Hungary

- Location of Gadna
- Coordinates: 48.40088°N 20.92951°E
- Country: Hungary
- County: Borsod-Abaúj-Zemplén

Area
  - Total: 8.09 km^{2} (3.12 sq mi)

Population (2004)
  - Total: 253
  - Density: 31.27/km^{2} (81.0/sq mi)
- Time zone: UTC+1 (CET)
  - Summer (DST): UTC+2 (CEST)
- Postal code: 3815
- Area code: 46

Gadna (Rusyn: Руська Ґадна) is a village in Borsod-Abaúj-Zemplén county, Hungary.
