= Imola, Hungary =

Imola
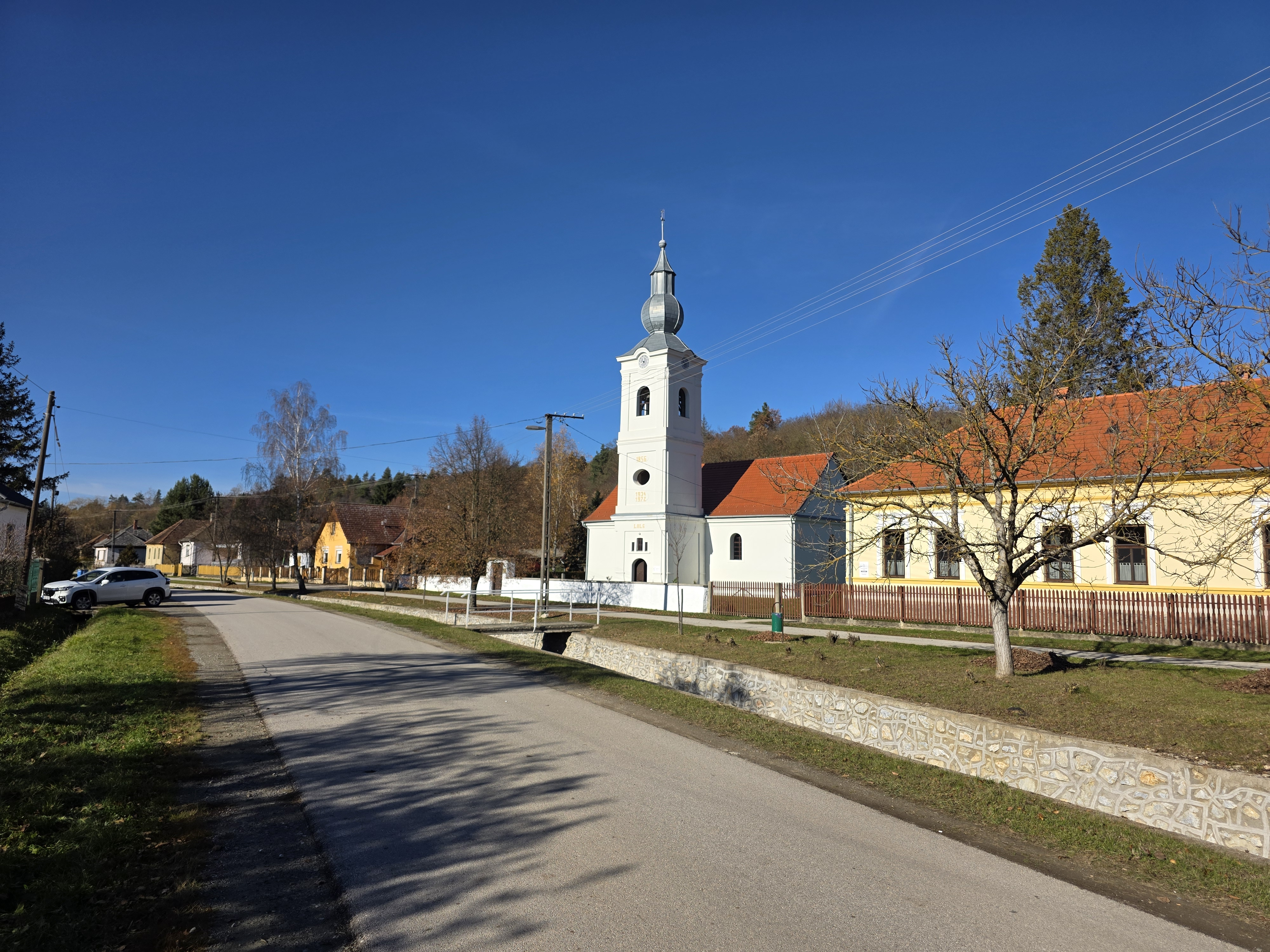

- Location of Borsod-Abaúj-Zemplén county in Hungary

- Location of Imola, Hungary
- Coordinates: 48.42027°N 20.55196°E
- Country: Hungary
- County: Borsod-Abaúj-Zemplén

Government
  - Mayor: Osváth Katalin (Ind.)

Area
  - Total: 18.12 km^{2} (7.00 sq mi)

Population (2022)
  - Total: 89
  - Density: 4.9/km^{2} (13/sq mi)
- Time zone: UTC+1 (CET)
  - Summer (DST): UTC+2 (CEST)
- Postal code: 3724
- Area code: 48

Imola is a village in Borsod-Abaúj-Zemplén county, Hungary.
