= Kány =

Coordinates: 48°31′N 21°01′E

- Village
- Kány’s Church of the Mother of God in 2013
- Interactive map of Kány
- Country: Hungary
- Regions: Northern Hungary
- County: Borsod-Abaúj-Zemplén County
- Time zone: UTC+1 (CET)
  - Summer (DST): UTC+2 (CEST)

Kány is a village in Borsod-Abaúj-Zemplén County in northeastern Hungary.
