= Imola, California =

Unincorporated community in California, United States

Imola
- unincorporated community
- Location in California Imola (the United States)
- Coordinates: 38°16′43″N 122°16′50″W
- Country: United States
- State: California
- County: Napa
- Elevation: 6.6 ft (2 m)

Imola was an unincorporated community in Napa County, California, United States. It lay at an elevation of 7 feet (2 m). Imola was located on the Southern Pacific Railroad, 1.25 miles (2.0 km) south of Napa.

The Imola post office opened in 1920, and closed in 1953.

Imola was the site of the Napa State Hospital (originally housing people diagnosed "insane"). Imola was named for Imola in Italy, which also hosted an insane asylum. In 1948, Imola was described as a "house of hope" in which patients were able to build skills working in the agricultural and industrial activities supported by the hospital. Imola was later annexed to the city of Napa.

== See also ==
- Napa State Hospital
