= Borsod-Abaúj-Zemplén County 5th constituency =

Hungarian national legislative constituency

Borsod-Abaúj-Zemplén County 5th constituency (Sátoraljaújhely)
- Constituency for the National Assembly
- Location of Borsod-Abaúj-Zemplén county 05 within Borsod-Abaúj-Zemplén county

- Location of Borsod-Abaúj-Zemplén county within Hungary
- County: Borsod-Abaúj-Zemplén
- Electorate: 73,338 (2022)
- Major settlements: Sátoraljaújhely

Current constituency
- Created: 2011
- Party: Tisza Party
- Member: László Lontay
- Elected: 2026

The 5th constituency of Borsod-Abaúj-Zemplén County (Hungarian: Borsod-Abaúj-Zemplén megyei 05. számú országgyűlési egyéni választókerület) is one of the single member constituencies of the National Assembly, the national legislature of Hungary. The constituency standard abbreviation: Borsod-Abaúj-Zemplén 05. OEVK.

Since 2026, it has been represented by László Lontay of the Tisza Party.

== Geography ==
The 5th constituency is located in north-eastern part of Borsod-Abaúj-Zemplén County.

=== List of municipalities ===
The constituency includes the following municipalities:

1. Abaújalpár
2. Abaújkér
3. Abaújszántó
4. Abaújvár
5. Alsóberecki
6. Alsóregmec
7. Arka
8. Baskó
9. Bodroghalom
10. Bodrogolaszi
11. Boldogkőújfalu
12. Boldogkőváralja
13. Bózsva
14. Cigánd
15. Dámóc
16. Encs
17. Erdőbénye
18. Erdőhorváti
19. Felsőberecki
20. Felsődobsza
21. Felsőregmec
22. Filkeháza
23. Fony
24. Fulókércs
25. Füzér
26. Füzérkajata
27. Füzérkomlós
28. Füzérradvány
29. Garadna
30. Gibárt
31. Golop
32. Gönc
33. Göncruszka
34. Györgytarló
35. Háromhuta
36. Hejce
37. Hercegkút
38. Hernádbűd
39. Hernádcéce
40. Hernádpetri
41. Hernádszurdok
42. Hernádvécse
43. Hidasnémeti
44. Hollóháza
45. Karcsa
46. Karos
47. Kéked
48. Kenézlő
49. Kishuta
50. Kisrozvágy
51. Komlóska
52. Korlát
53. Kovácsvágás
54. Lácacséke
55. Makkoshotyka
56. Méra
57. Mikóháza
58. Mogyoróska
59. Nagyhuta
60. Nagyrozvágy
61. Novajidrány
62. Nyíri
63. Olaszliszka
64. Pácin
65. Pálháza
66. Pányok
67. Pere
68. Pusztafalu
69. Pusztaradvány
70. Rátka
71. Regéc
72. Révleányvár
73. Ricse
74. Sárazsadány
75. Sárospatak
76. Sátoraljaújhely
77. Semjén
78. Sima
79. Szalaszend
80. Szegi
81. Szegilong
82. Szemere
83. Tállya
84. Telkibánya
85. Tiszacsermely
86. Tiszakarád
87. Tolcsva
88. Tornyosnémeti
89. Vágáshuta
90. Vajdácska
91. Vámosújfalu
92. Vilmány
93. Vilyvitány
94. Viss
95. Vizsoly
96. Zalkod
97. Zemplénagárd
98. Zsujta

== Members ==
The constituency was first represented by Richárd Hörcsik of the Fidesz from 2014, and he was re-elected in 2018 and 2022. In the 2026 election, László Lontay of the Tisza Party was elected representative.

| Election | Member | Party | % | Ref. |
|---|---|---|---|---|
| 2014 | Richárd Hörcsik | Fidesz | 45.52 | |
| 2018 | Richárd Hörcsik | Fidesz | 49.03 | |
| 2022 | Richárd Hörcsik | Fidesz | 60.60 | |
| 2026 | László Lontay | Tisza Party | 50.29 | |
