= List of settlements in Hungary by ethnic Slovak population =

This list contains Hungarian settlements in which ethnic Slovaks make up over 1% of the total population, according to the 2022 census, ordered by their percentage of the local population.

According to the 2022 census, there are 29,881 Slovaks in Hungary, who form at least 5% of the population in 78 settlements.

In localities where Slovaks make up more than 10% of the population, the Slovak language can be used by the local administration.

Absolute Slovak majority; Slovak language has a special status in local administration
10-50% Slovaks; Slovak language has a special status in local administration
Under 10% Slovaks; Slovak language without special status in local administration

Settlement	Slovak name	County	Population	Slovak population
Rajka	–	Győr-Moson-Sopron	5,249	63.2%
Répáshuta	Repašská Huta	Borsod-Abaúj-Zemplén	431	47.2%
Kishuta	Malá Huta	Borsod-Abaúj-Zemplén	255	42.9%
Felsőpetény	Horné Peťany	Nógrád	534	39.5%
Alsóregmec	Nižný Redmec	Borsod-Abaúj-Zemplén	187	38.4%
Kéked	Nižný Kíked	Borsod-Abaúj-Zemplén	209	36.5%
Tornyosnémeti	Torňoš Nemta	Borsod-Abaúj-Zemplén	529	34.8%
Sámsonháza	Šamšon	Nógrád	248	34.0%
Ősagárd	Agárd	Nógrád	292	31.2%
Nézsa	Nežovce	Nógrád	1,197	28.5%
Bükkszentkereszt	Nová Huta	Borsod-Abaúj-Zemplén	1,125	27.9%
Csabaszabadi	Čabasabady	Békés	274	27.0%
Örménykút	Irminčok	Békés	296	26.4%
Abaújvár	Abovský Novohrad	Borsod-Abaúj-Zemplén	219	26.4%
Nagyhuta	Veľká Huta	Borsod-Abaúj-Zemplén	42	24.3%
Bezenye	Beziň	Győr-Moson-Sopron	1,388	22.6%
Füzér	Fizér	Borsod-Abaúj-Zemplén	348	20.8%
Terény	Terany	Nógrád	348	20.3%
Hidasnémeti	Hidaš Nemnica	Borsod-Abaúj-Zemplén	1,024	20.3%
Csővár	Čuvár	Pest	611	19.8%
Pilisszentkereszt	Mlynky	Pest	2,171	19.1%
Alsópetény	Dolné Peťany	Nógrád	566	18.7%
Hollóháza	Holoház	Borsod-Abaúj-Zemplén	744	18.1%
Bér	Bír	Nógrád	377	17.3%
Legénd	Legind	Nógrád	469	17.1%
Kétsoprony	Kétšoproň	Békés	1,260	16.7%
Ambrózfalva	Ambrózka	Csongrád-Csanád	427	16.3%
Vágáshuta	Vágašská Huta	Borsod-Abaúj-Zemplén	82	16.3%
Pányok	Paňovce	Borsod-Abaúj-Zemplén	77	15.9%
Göncruszka	Gynecká Ruská	Borsod-Abaúj-Zemplén	654	15.4%
Bánk	Banka	Nógrád	747	14.7%
Galgaguta	Guta	Nógrád	619	14.6%
Kardos	Kardoš	Békés	509	14.3%
Dunakiliti	Klity	Győr-Moson-Sopron	2,200	14.2%
Hejce	Choca	Borsod-Abaúj-Zemplén	201	13.5%
Feketeerdő	Čierny Les	Győr-Moson-Sopron	690	13.2%
Erdőkürt	Kirť	Nógrád	496	13.0%
Csabacsűd	Čabačúd	Békés	1,598	13.0%
Lucfalva	Lucina	Nógrád	603	12.8%
Hidvégardó	Ardov	Borsod-Abaúj-Zemplén	536	12.7%
Komjáti	Komjatné	Borsod-Abaúj-Zemplén	176	12.6
Egyházasdengeleg	Dengeleg	Nógrád	404	12.5%
Vanyarc	Veňarec	Nógrád	1,154	12.5%
Tótkomlós	Slovenský Komlóš	Békés	5,339	12.2%
Pilisszántó	Santov	Pest	2,687	11.8%
Dunaegyháza	–	Bács-Kiskun	1,448	10.9%
Piliscsév	Čív	Komárom-Esztergom	2,539	10.1%
Krasznokvajda	Krásnik-Vajda	Borsod-Abaúj-Zemplén	469	10.1%
Püspökhatvan	Pišpek	Pest	1,368	9.9%
Tardos	Tardoš	Komárom-Esztergom	1,621	9.1%
Galgagyörk	Ďurka	Pest	947	9.0%
Kesztölc	Kestúc	Komárom-Esztergom	2,654	8.9%
Varbóc	Vrbovce	Borsod-Abaúj-Zemplén	56	8.9%
Mikóháza	Mikoház	Borsod-Abaúj-Zemplén	507	8.6%
Perecse	Pereča	Borsod-Abaúj-Zemplén	15	8.3%
Acsa	Jača	Pest	1,311	8.3%
Nógrádsáp	Šápov	Nógrád	901	8.3%
Hegyeshalom	–	Győr-Moson-Sopron	3,753	8.1%
Levél	–	Győr-Moson-Sopron	2,251	8.0%
Litka	–	Borsod-Abaúj-Zemplén	35	8.0%
Nyíri	Níra	Borsod-Abaúj-Zemplén	372	7.4%
Pilisszentlászló	Svätý Václav	Pest	1,280	7.2%
Mogyorósbánya	Moďoroš	Komárom-Esztergom	852	7.2%
Nagybánhegyes	Veľký Bánhedeš	Békés	1,072	7.0%
Pálháza	Palház	Borsod-Abaúj-Zemplén	956	6.9%
Sárisáp	Šáp	Komárom-Esztergom	2,732	6.7%
Hernádszurdok	Surdok	Borsod-Abaúj-Zemplén	178	6.7%
Miske	Miške	Bács-Kiskun	1,616	6.5%
Szászfa	–	Borsod-Abaúj-Zemplén	98	6.3%
Dunasziget	Dunajský Ostrov	Győr-Moson-Sopron	1,706	6.1%
Bokor	Bukra	Nógrád	93	5.6%
Tornaszentjakab	Svätý Jakub	Borsod-Abaúj-Zemplén	215	5.6%
Szarvas	Sarvaš	Békés	14,457	5.5%
Ecser	Ečer	Pest	4,113	5.4%
Kondoros	Kondoroš	Békés	4,554	5.2%
Jásd	Jášč	Veszprém	667	5.2%
Vácegres	Židov	Pest	891	5.1%
Bózsva	Božva	Borsod-Abaúj-Zemplén	154	5.0%
Szuha	Suchá	Nógrád	549	4.8%
Telekgerendás	Telekgerendáš	Békés	1,404	4.8%
Csomád	Čomad	Pest	1,782	4.7%
Hont	–	Nógrád	531	4.5%
Gönc	Gynec	Borsod-Abaúj-Zemplén	1,869	4.5%
Medgyesegyháza	Medeš	Békés	3,150	4.4%
Füzérkomlós	Komlóš	Borsod-Abaúj-Zemplén	273	4.4%
Tornaszentandrás	Svätý Ondrej	Borsod-Abaúj-Zemplén	165	4.4%
Háromhuta	Tri Huty	Borsod-Abaúj-Zemplén	117	4.3%
Sóskút	Šoškút	Pest	3,598	4.2%
Mogyoróska	–	Borsod-Abaúj-Zemplén	74	3.8%
Novajidrány	Novaj-Jaradná	Borsod-Abaúj-Zemplén	1,330	3.8%
Pitvaros	Pitvaroš	Csongrád-Csanád	1 181	3.8%
Újrónafő	–	Győr-Moson-Sopron	829	3.6%
Galvács	Galváč	Borsod-Abaúj-Zemplén	90	3.6%
Viszló	Vislava	Borsod-Abaúj-Zemplén	60	3.6%
Nógrád	Novohrad	Nógrád	1,573	3.5%
Szügy	Sudice	Nógrád	1,400	3.4%
Kiskőrös	Malý Kereš	Bács-Kiskun	13,409	3.3%
Becskeháza	Bečkehaz	Borsod-Abaúj-Zemplén	27	3.3%
Bódvaszilas	Silaš	Borsod-Abaúj-Zemplén	918	3.2%
Szápár	Cafár	Veszprém	467	2.9%
Máriakálnok	–	Győr-Moson-Sopron	2,074	2.6%
Fancsal	Fančal	Borsod-Abaúj-Zemplén	323	2.6%
Vizsoly	–	Borsod-Abaúj-Zemplén	900	2.6%
Telkibánya	Telkibaňa	Borsod-Abaúj-Zemplén	544	2.4%
Nagykeresztúr	–	Nógrád	251	2.4%
Békéscsaba	Békešská Čaba	Békés	55,455	2.3%
Zsujta	Žujta	Borsod-Abaúj-Zemplén	215	2.3%
Csanádalberti	Alberti	Csongrád-Csanád	444	2.2%
Rábcakapi	–	Győr-Moson-Sopron	165	2.2%
Kisbodak	Malé Bodíky	Győr-Moson-Sopron	360	2.2%
Füzérkajata	Kojatice	Borsod-Abaúj-Zemplén	93	2.2%
Szalaszend	Sala-Senda	Borsod-Abaúj-Zemplén	1,011	2.1%
Gerendás	Gerendáš	Békés	1,035	2.1%
Nagytarcsa	Veľká Tarča	Pest	6,218	2.0%
Rétság	Rečág	Nógrád	2,572	2.0%
Vértesszőlős	Síleš	Komárom-Esztergom	3,495	2.0%
Vilyvitány	Viľa-Vitanová	Borsod-Abaúj-Zemplén	256	2.0%
Kóspallag	Kóšpalag	Pest	729	1.9%
Drégelypalánk	Dregeľská Polianka	Nógrád	1,382	1.7%
Mosonszolnok	–	Győr-Moson-Sopron	1,804	1.7%
Mezőberény	Poľný Berinčok	Békés	9,562	1.7%
Boldogkőújfalu	–	Borsod-Abaúj-Zemplén	656	1.7%
Komlóska	Komlóška	Borsod-Abaúj-Zemplén	239	1.7%
Csömör	Čemer	Pest	10,182	1.6%
Péteri	Peterka	Pest	2,627	1.6%
Perőcsény	Perovčany	Pest	346	1.6%
Mecsér	–	Győr-Moson-Sopron	645	1.6%
Mihálygerge	Michalova Gerga	Nógrád	502	1.6%
Karos	Karoš	Borsod-Abaúj-Zemplén	487	1.6%
Pusztafalu	Pustá Ves	Borsod-Abaúj-Zemplén	186	1.6%
Vilmány	–	Borsod-Abaúj-Zemplén	1,440	1.6%
Csorvás	Čorváš	Békés	4,435	1.5%
Felsőregmec	Vyšný Redmec	Borsod-Abaúj-Zemplén	345	1.5%
Szinpetri	–	Borsod-Abaúj-Zemplén	195	1.5%
Csobánka	Čobanka	Pest	3,559	1.4%
Várbalog	–	Győr-Moson-Sopron	376	1.4%
Sátoraljaújhely	Nové Mesto pod Šiatrom	Borsod-Abaúj-Zemplén	13,274	1.4%
Füzérradvány	Radvaň	Borsod-Abaúj-Zemplén	283	1.4%
Iliny	Ilinovce	Nógrád	150	1.3%
Kisbárkány	–	Nógrád	138	1.3%
Felsőberecki	Vyšné Berecky	Borsod-Abaúj-Zemplén	237	1.3%
Zemplénagárd	Agard	Borsod-Abaúj-Zemplén	620	1.3%
Elek	–	Békés	4,300	1.2%
Újszalonta	Salonta	Békés	97	1.2%
Bakonycsernye	Čerňa	Fejér	3,000	1.2%
Abaújkér	–	Borsod-Abaúj-Zemplén	586	1.2%
Bánréve	Banriev	Borsod-Abaúj-Zemplén	1,166	1.2%
Sajópüspöki	Biskupice nad Slanou	Borsod-Abaúj-Zemplén	489	1.2%
Szögliget	Segovec	Borsod-Abaúj-Zemplén	548	1.1%
Méra	Míra	Borsod-Abaúj-Zemplén	1,498	1.0%
Piliscsaba	Pilišská Čaba	Pest	8,560	1.0%
Szécsénke	Sečianka	Nógrád	198	1.0%
Pusztaottlaka	Bodzášottlaka	Békés	297	1.0%
Szabadkígyós	–	Békés	2,382	1.0%
Németbánya	–	Veszprém	111	1.0%
Kimle	–	Győr-Moson-Sopron	2,377	1.0%
Fenyőfő	–	Győr-Moson-Sopron	100	1.0%
