= Tokaj District =

Coordinates: 48.1667°N 21.3667°E

Tokaj District Tokaji járás
- Districts of Hungary
- Coat of arms

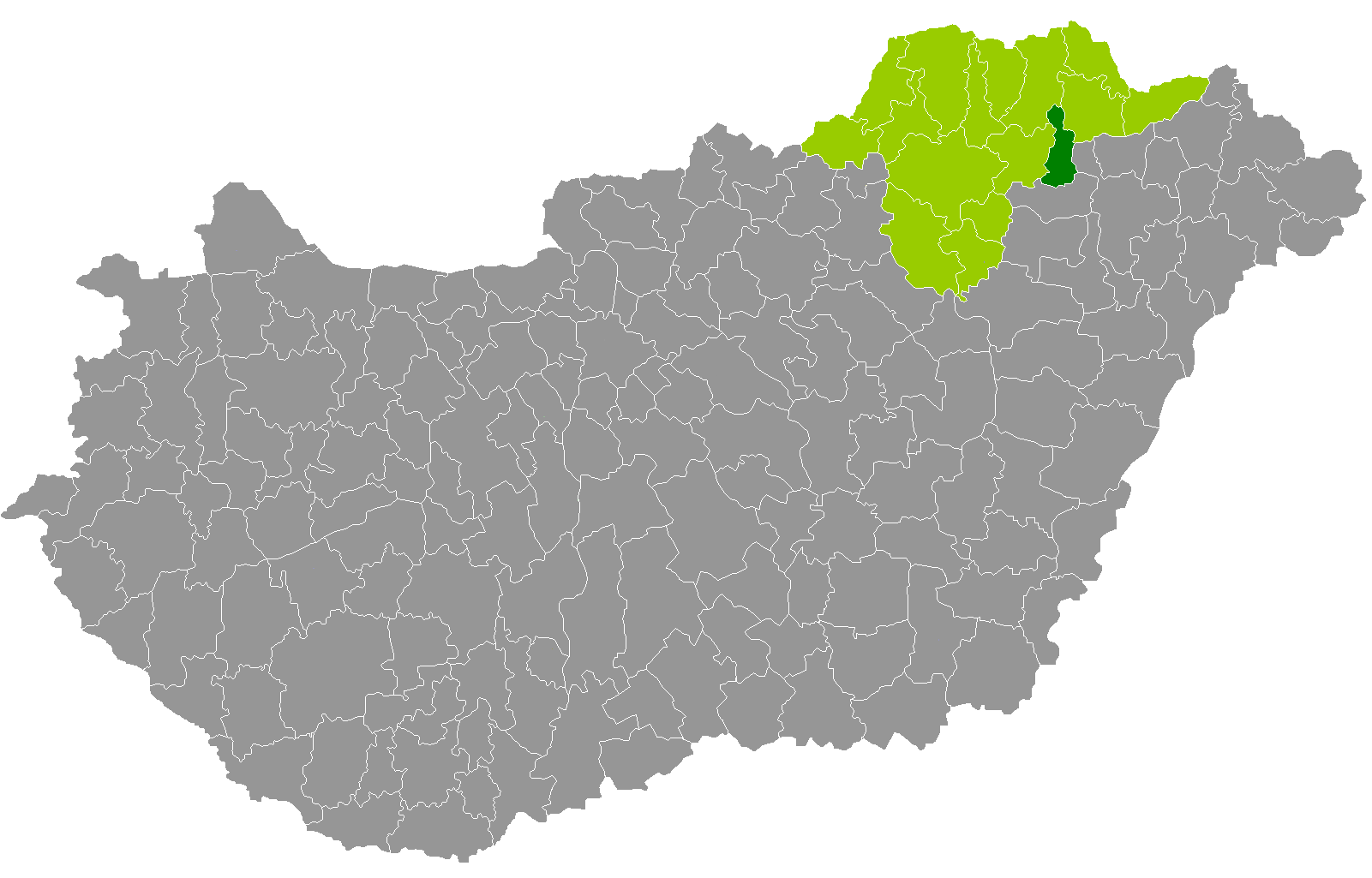
- Tokaj District within Hungary and Borsod-Abaúj-Zemplén County.
- Country: Hungary
- County: Borsod-Abaúj-Zemplén
- District seat: Tokaj

Area
  - Total: 255.81 km^{2} (98.77 sq mi)
  - Rank: 15th in Borsod-Abaúj-Zemplén

Population (2011 census)
  - Total: 13,331
  - Rank: 16th in Borsod-Abaúj-Zemplén
  - Density: 52/km^{2} (130/sq mi)

Tokaj (Hungarian: Tokaji járás) is a district in eastern part of Borsod-Abaúj-Zemplén County. Tokaj is also the name of the town where the district seat is found. The district is located in the Northern Hungary Statistical Region.

== Geography ==
Tokaj District borders with Gönc District to the north, Sárospatak District and Nyíregyháza District (Szabolcs-Szatmár-Bereg County) to the east, Tiszavasvári District (Szabolcs-Szatmár-Bereg County) to the south, Szerencs District to the west. The number of the inhabited places in Tokaj District is 11.

== Municipalities ==
The district has 1 town and 10 villages. (ordered by population, as of 1 January 2012)

- Bodrogkeresztúr (1,107)
- Bodrogkisfalud (836)
- Csobaj (702)
- Erdőbénye (1,018)
- Szegi (296)
- Szegilong (203)
- Taktabáj (575)
- Tarcal (2,824)
- Tiszaladány (670)
- Tiszatardos (223)
- **Tokaj** (4,839) – district seat

The bolded municipality is the city.

== Demographics ==
Religion in Tokaj District (2011 census)
1. Catholic Church (34.9%)
2. Greek Catholicism (7.50%)
3. Calvinism (25.8%)
4. Lutheranism (0.30%)
5. Other religions (0.70%)
6. Non-religious (8.20%)
7. Atheists (0.70%)
8. Undeclared (21.9%)

In 2011, it had a population of 13,331 and the population density was 52/km^{2}.

| Year | County population | Change |
|---|---|---|
| 2011 | 13,331 | n/a |

=== Ethnicity ===
Besides the Hungarian majority, the main minority is the Roma (approx. 650).

Total population (2011 census): 13,331
Ethnic groups (2011 census): Identified themselves: 12,653 persons:

- Hungarians: 11,848 (93.64%)
- Gypsies: 620 (4.90%)
- Others and indefinable: 185 (1.46%)

Approx. 500 persons in Tokaj District did not declare their ethnic group at the 2011 census.

=== Religion ===
Religious adherence in the county according to 2011 census:

- Catholic – 5,655 (Roman Catholic – 4,655; Greek Catholic – 998);
- Reformed – 3,436;
- Evangelical – 41;
- other religions – 95;
- Non-religious – 1,096;
- Atheism – 89;
- Undeclared – 2,919.

== Gallery ==
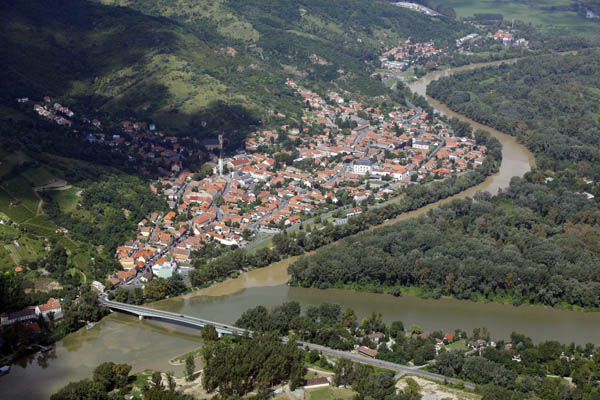
Tokaj, the district seat

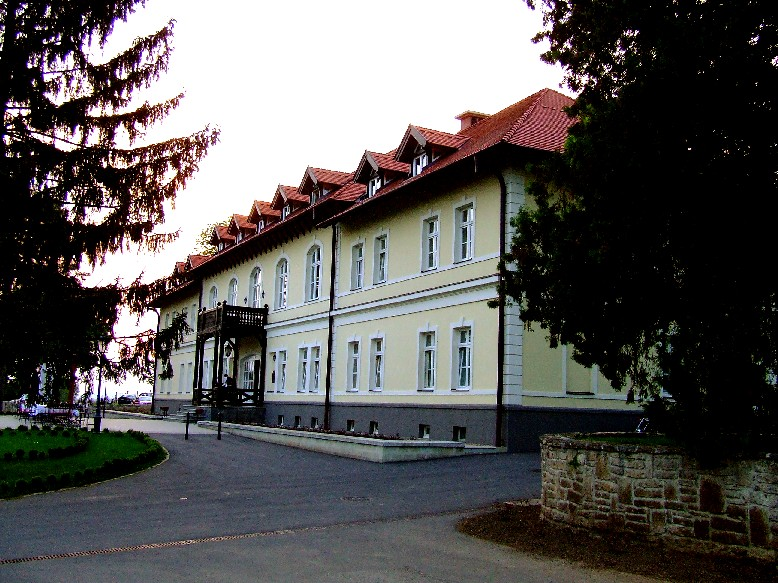
Degenfeld Mansion in Tarcal

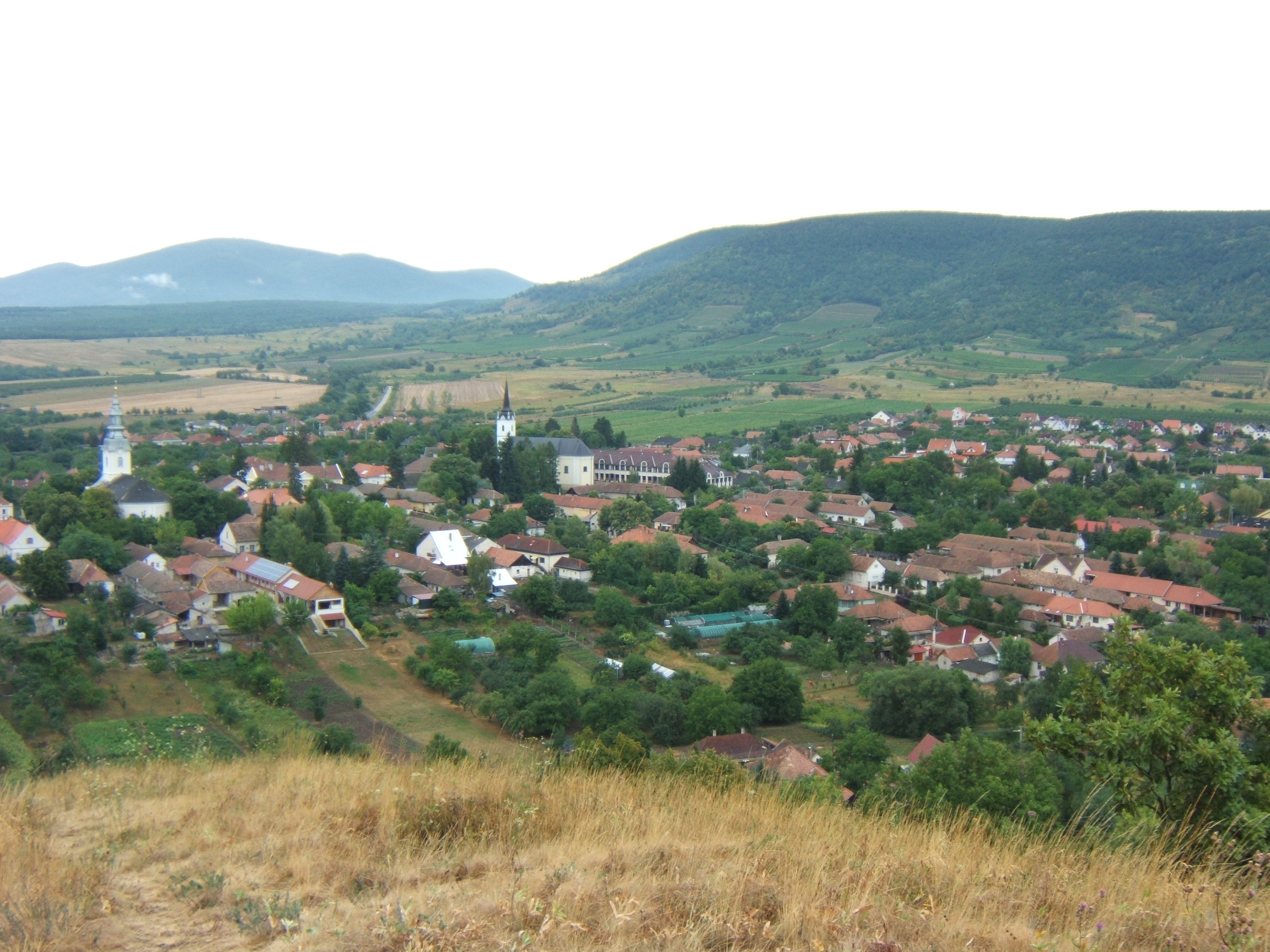
Aerial view of Erdőbénye

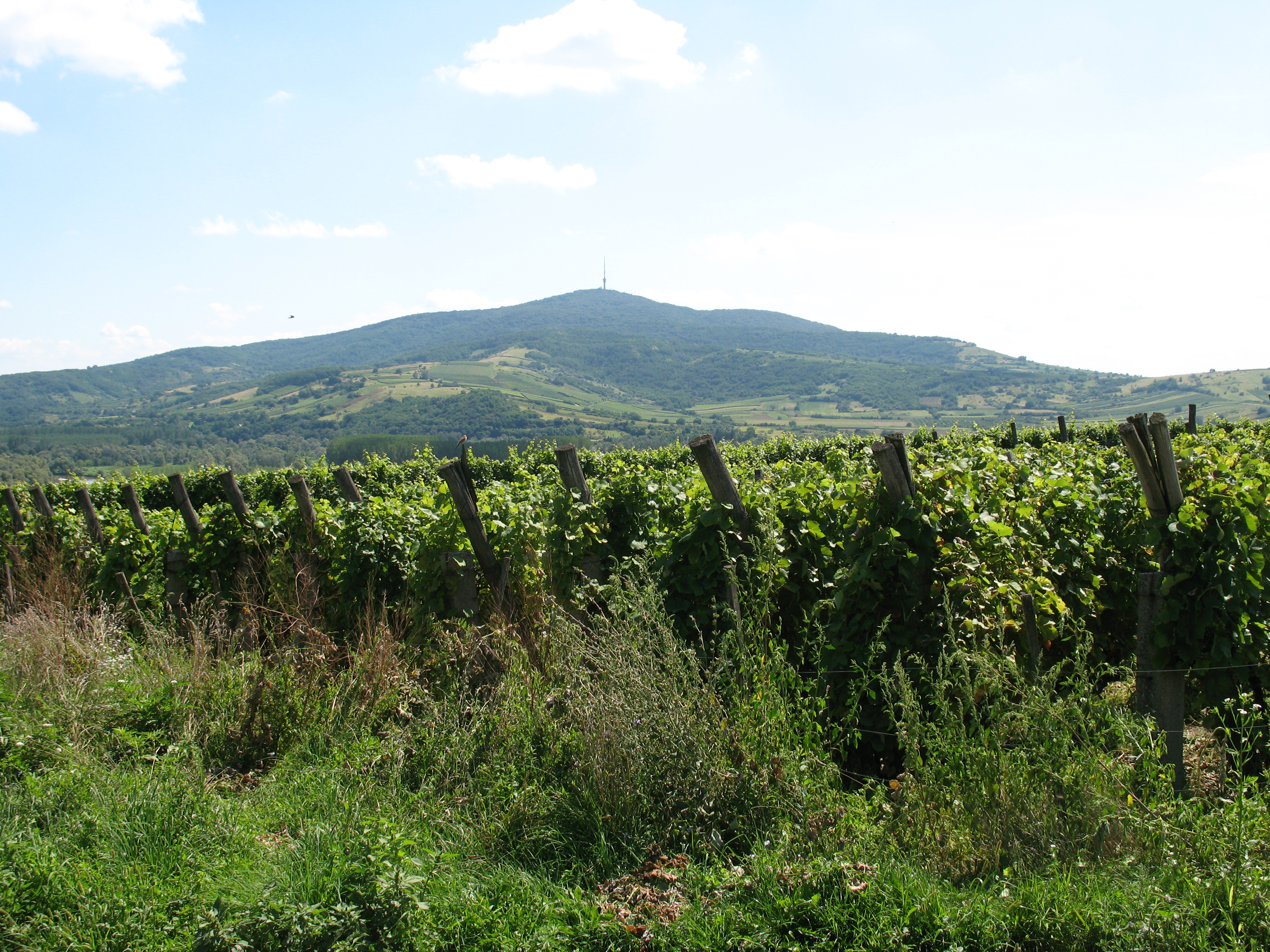
Wineyards near Tokaj

== See also ==
- List of cities and towns of Hungary
