= László Lontay =

Hungarian politician

Member of the National Assembly
- Assuming office 9 May 2026
- Succeeding: Richárd Hörcsik
- Constituency: Borsod-Abaúj-Zemplén 5th

Personal details
- Party: Tisza

László Lontay is a Hungarian politician who was elected member of the National Assembly in 2026 representing the Borsod-Abaúj-Zemplén County 5th constituency. He previously worked as a nature conservation expert and boat captain.
