= Pálháza =

- Flag Coat of arms

- Location of Pálháza in Hungary
- Coordinates: 48.4717°N 21.5094°E
- Country: Hungary
- Region: Northern Hungary
- County: Borsod-Abaúj-Zemplén

Area
  - Total: 6.75 km^{2} (2.61 sq mi)

Population (2012)
  - Total: 1,000
  - Density: 150/km^{2} (380/sq mi)
- Time zone: UTC+1 (CET)
  - Summer (DST): UTC+2 (CEST)
- Postal code: 3994
- Area code: +36 46
- Website: http://palhaza.hu/

Pálháza (Slovak: Palház) is a town in Borsod-Abaúj-Zemplén county, Hungary, 87 km (54 mi) east from county capital Miskolc.

== History ==
The area has been inhabited since ancient times. The village was founded in the 1320s and belonged to the Füzér estate. It was first mentioned in 1387.

The village was destroyed several times during the Hussite wars and the Ottoman occupation of Hungary. In 1711 a plague killed the inhabitants. The village was mentioned again in 1786. Its lumber mill, the predecessor of today's lumber factory was built in 1875. It was followed by the construction of a narrow gauge railway route, the first forest railway in Hungary.

The national animal fair has been organized in Pálháza regularly since 1914.

After the Treaty of Trianon Pálháza became a village near the new state border, but the village began to prosper again. In 1958 a mine was opened nearby.

In spite of local protests the narrow gauge railway line was demolished in 1980, but was built again after 1989.

Pálháza was granted town status in 2005, making it Hungary's most sparsely populated town, with a population of only 1000.

== Nearby villages ==
Bózsva (3 km), Filkeháza (2 km), Füzérradvány (2 km), Kishuta (4 km), Antegria (7 km).
