= Garadna =

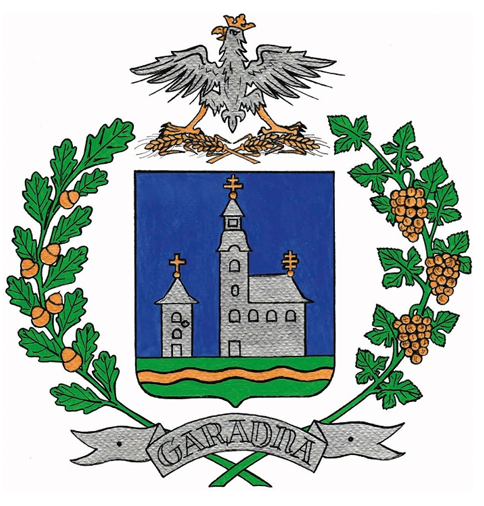
- Coat of arms

- Location of Borsod-Abaúj-Zemplén county in Hungary

- Location of Garadna
- Coordinates: 48.41778°N 21.17297°E
- Country: Hungary
- County: Borsod-Abaúj-Zemplén

Area
  - Total: 9.74 km^{2} (3.76 sq mi)

Population (2023)
  - Total: 362
  - Density: 38.4/km^{2} (99/sq mi)
- Time zone: UTC+1 (CET)
  - Summer (DST): UTC+2 (CEST)
- Postal code: 3873
- Area code: 46

Garadna is a village in Borsod-Abaúj-Zemplén county, Hungary, in the Encs District.

== Etymology ==
The name comes from Slavic/Early Slovak adjective gradná - "belonging to the castle", "an extramural settlement". The name was adopted by Hungarians before the spirantization of Slavic /g/ to /h/. See e.g. Veľká Hradná (Slovakia).

== History ==
Archeologists found evidences of Neolithic and Imperial Roman German settlements and a former Celtic cemetery. Ploughshares has been found which has been used at the time of the Hungarian conquest of the Carpathian Basin.

There were at least two settlements called Garadna. The first village was first mentioned in 1234 as Grathna and Gradna (Granna), later Fel Garadna and Petri. It was located somewhere near the present-day Hernádvécse and Hernádszurdok, and was owned by Péter, son of Houl. The second village was founded near the present location of the village and it was the possession of the people of the nearby Sárvár. King Béla IV attached it to the County of Vizsoly, and in 1259 it was given to Kozma Zsámboki.

During the reign of King Charles I Garadna had many possessors. In 1312 the village was confiscated from János, son of Kozma, because of his disloyalty, and given to Sándor Nekcsei from the Aba family. In 1323 it was given to Apród Zovárd, and after his death, Miklós Drugeth became the new owner who attached it to the castle of Gönc. It was a short ownership, however, because in 1327 Charles I gave back Garadna to the heirs of Apród Zovárd. From the 15th century, the village came under the control of the city of Kassa, Abaúj County. Many county assembly were held at this time in Garadna.

During the Ottoman conquest of Hungary it remained the part of the Kingdom of Hungary, but suffered great casualties. Imperial troops of the Habsburg Empire frequently looted the village, just like the Ottoman troops which were attacked it in 1641 and were dragged away many people. Following this, a fortification was built around Garadna.

After the end of the Ottoman conquest it was frequently depopulated and repopulated, because of the Rákóczi's War of Independence and the Bubonic plague. From the 1730s, the village was populated by Ruthenian people - their culture and their Eastern Catholic faith still can be found. Two Cholera plague hit Garadna, in 1831 and 1872 - the second plague ended in 26 July, the day of Saint Anne, which was since became the official feast day of Garadna. In the 1860s, it was given a railway connection with a train station (which is now part of Novajidrány).

After World War I the village remained in Hungary as a part of Abaúj-Torna County. In the 1930s developments were made: a new mayor office and elementary school were built and electricity was connected. During World War II, the Jewish population of Garadna was completely eradicated, most of them were killed in Auschwitz.

After World War II the village developed further and its population peaked in the 1970s.

== Famous people ==
- Hungarian writer Mihály Gulyás (1929–2003) was born and buried here
- Writer and engineer Vladimir Rott (born in the Soviet Union from Hungarian Jewish parents) is the descendant of the former Jewish community of Garadna. He helped rebuilding the Jewish cemetery and made great cultural activity for the village, and in 2022 they became its honorary citizen.

== Attractions ==
- A Roman Catholic chapel which is the only remained part of a former church built in the 15th century. it is famous for its sun-dial.
- An Eastern Catholic church, which was built in 1808
