= Vladimir Rott =

Canadian engineer and author

- Born: 24 May 1935 (age 91); Bobruysk, Belarus, USSR
- Citizenship: Canada
- Education: Tomsk Polytechnic University
- Known for: Electrical Engineer, Author, Philanthropist
- Scientific career
- Workplaces: Six Fix Services, Toronto; Sibel Engineering, Toronto; AvtoVAZ Volga Automobile Plant; ELSIB Sibelectromotor
- Website: http://www.vladimirrott.com

Vladimir Rott, a Canadian engineer turned author, was born in 1935 in the Soviet Union, into a family of immigrants from Hungary. In 1974, during a visit to Toronto he defected to Canada, leaving behind his wife and three children in Togliatti, Russia. Reunited with his family he led a life of an engineer, entrepreneur and traveled the world making up for the lost opportunities not available to the citizens of the Soviet regime. In later years he became a prolific writer dedicating his free time to writing autobiographical books and philanthropic pursuits in support of the forgotten and underprivileged Siberian Jewry.

== Biography ==
=== Early years ===
Born in the Soviet Union at the end of the depression into a family of Jewish Hungarian immigrants, Vladimir’s childhood was scarred, at the age of three, by the arrest of his father Ferenc in 1938, along with millions of other innocent people during Stalin’s Great Purge. The family became Soviet Citizens in the hopes that the unjust arrest and imprisonment of Ferenc would somehow be overturned. Along with mother Regina and older brother Jozef, Vladimir endured the stigma of being the family of the "Enemy of the State" during the Soviet regime. When the Soviet regime collapsed, the invading Nazis imposed their own order in Belarus, life for the Jewish population of Bobruysk saw a traumatic change. All of Bobruysk's Jews were rounded up, isolated, and systematically exterminated. But, amazingly, Vladimir's family of three, survived due to their "Hungarian" ancestry. Following the arrest of Ferenc in 1938, Regina had to take on several jobs in order to ensure the family’s survival, leaving Vladimir to fend for himself. Street smart, and able to fix almost anything, Vladimir's personality developed into that of a tough survivor who is drawn to challenges and able to work his way out of any situation.

=== Middle years ===
The family moved to Tomsk Siberia in 1954, in order to be closer to Ferenc, still hoping to be reunited. Vladimir attended Tomsk Polytechnic University and received undergraduate and graduate degrees in electrical engineering. While playing violin in the university's Big Band orchestra, he met and married Iya Yaroslavskaya. They had two children in Tomsk, Sandor and Ilona. Their third child Edwin, was born after the family moved to Togliatti where Vladimir became the head of Installation and Maintenance of Machinery department of the LADA VAZ - Volga Automobile Plant, supervising 1,500 employees. Vladimir and family traveled to Hungary to be reunited with family there and to meet their extended family from Canada. This led to an invitation to visit Canada and to Vladimir's ultimate defection in Toronto in 1974. In late 1975, Vladimir was reunited with his wife and three children in Toronto, where he still lives today.

=== Later years ===
In 1984, he was reunited with his childhood diaries and the cherished letters his father wrote from prison in Kolyma, Siberia, from 1935-1952. These documents were smuggled out of Russia via Hungary and Austria by his friends. The arrival of this archive was marked by a congratulatory letter from the renowned Russian exiled author, Alexander Solzhenitsyn. These historical documents inspired him to write several books starting with "My Father’s Letters from Siberian Prison," which were purchased by many Hungarian high school libraries and became part of the curriculum. He received an award from the Hungarian Government and became an honorary member of the Hungarian Writers' Guild in 2013.

For several years Rott worked on restoration of a Jewish cemetery and construction of a monument in Mysovaya Station, Siberia, which was unveiled in June 2014.

== Career ==
- Tomsk, Russia - Sibelectromotor (Sibirsky Motorny Zavod/ Siberian Electric Motors)
- Togliatti, Russia - VAZ (Volzhski Avtomobilny Zavod/ Volga Automobile Plant), TPU (Togliatti Politekhnitchesky Institut - Togliatti Polytechnical Institute)
- Toronto, Canada - Six Fix Services Ltd., Sibel Engineering
- Member of the Association of Professional Engineers of Ontario

== Bibliography ==
=== Father's Letters from Siberian Prison ===
Printed in three languages: English, Russian and Hungarian.

Edited collection of letters Ferenc Roth wrote from Siberian Prison in Kolyma, 1935-1952. These letters served as the only connection Vladimir had to his father. This archive accurately documents the family's hardships after Ferenc's arrest during Stalin's regime and life under the Nazi occupation of Bobruysk. They are filled with the empty hope of a family reunion; father's futile threats and attempts to discipline his unruly teenage son; moving passages expressing deep love for his wife and regret of past actions which resulted in the family's misfortunes.

=== In Defiance of Fate: Book 1 – Joy from Sadness ===
Printed in three languages: English, Russian and Hungarian.

Dedicated to the memory of his parents, Vladimir has written this book in which he invites the reader to visit a Hungarian village at the turn of the 20th century, to spend time together with him during his school days, as well as through the German occupation of Bobruysk (Belarus); to learn about the ways he became an engineer in Siberia – in the university city of Tomsk, to follow the stages of the challenging construction and production at the "Lada-VAZ" – the Volga Automobile Plant in Togliatti. He also shares his story of defection to Canada.

=== In Defiance of Fate: Book 2 - Joy of Discovery ===
Printed in three languages: English, Russian and Hungarian.

This is Book Two of Vladimir Rott's memoirs, Joy of Discoveries. In it he describes his fight to secure his family's emigration from the Soviet Union, experiences of culture shock, acclimatization, and maturity in the West, his first years in Canada, the lives and accomplishments of his children and grandchildren – as well as his meetings with his American relatives, the creation of a family tree, and the building of the Holocaust memorial in the village of Garadna, Hungary, commemorating the 32 Spielberger family members who were murdered in Auschwitz.

=== Mysovaya Station ===
Printed in three languages: English, Russian and Hungarian.

Vladimir's wife Iya Yaroslavskaya Guterman was born in the Buryat-Mongolia region in Ulan-Ude on Lake Baykal. The book explores the family history in this distant region, the trials and tribulations of Siberian Jews, and the unfortunate life of Iya's distant cousin in a psychiatric institution in the Siberian town of Babushkin, once known as Mysovaya Station, which was a bustling stop along Tsarist Russia's Great Tea Road.

== Awards and honours ==
- Order of the Badge of Honour, 1971, USSR
- A Pro Cultura Hungarica Emelékplakett - Hungarian Cultural Medal, 2013, Hungary
- Honorary citizen of Garadna, 2022, Hungary
