= Bodrogkisfalud =

- Village
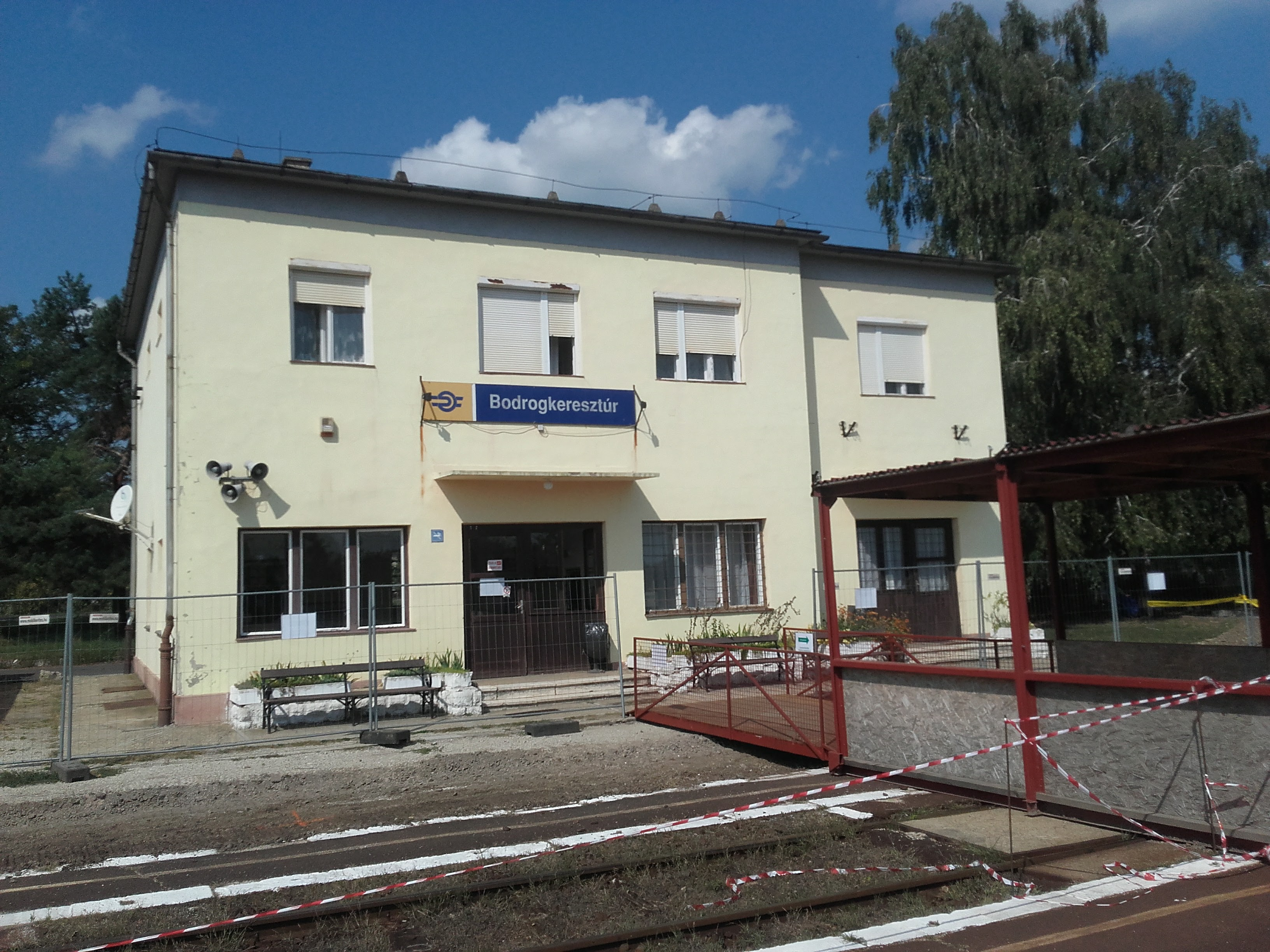
- Bodrogkeresztúr railway station

- Flag Coat of arms

- Location of Bodrogkisfalud
- Coordinates: 48.17215°N 21.35453°E
- Country: Hungary
- Region: Northern Hungary
- County: Borsod-Abaúj-Zemplén
- District: Tokaj

Area
  - Total: 14.68 km^{2} (5.67 sq mi)

Population (1 January 2025)
  - Total: 754
  - Density: 51.4/km^{2} (133/sq mi)
- Time zone: UTC+1 (CET)
  - Summer (DST): UTC+2 (CEST)
- Postal code: 3917
- Area code: (+36) 47
- Website: www.bodrogkisfalud.hu

Bodrogkisfalud is a village in Borsod-Abaúj-Zemplén county, Hungary.

It was first mentioned under the name Kysfalud in a source dating to 1220. Its primary industry is viticulture. The current mayor, as of May 2021, is Sándor Balogh.

The village has a neo-Romanesque Roman Catholic church built in 1930, consecrated in honour of St Anne. There was no church building in the town until 1772, when the Jesuits consecrated a small chapel there. A full church was built in 1810, but by 1929 had reached such a state of disrepair that it had to be demolished, to be replaced by the current building.

It also features a bust of György Klapka by Gyula Alpár Veres, and a 1896 monument to the 1848/1849 Hungarian Revolution.

Bodrogkisfalud had a significant Jewish population from the 18th century until the Second World War, when it was deported by the Nazis; very few returned.
