= Pálházi State Forest Railway =

Railway line in Hungary

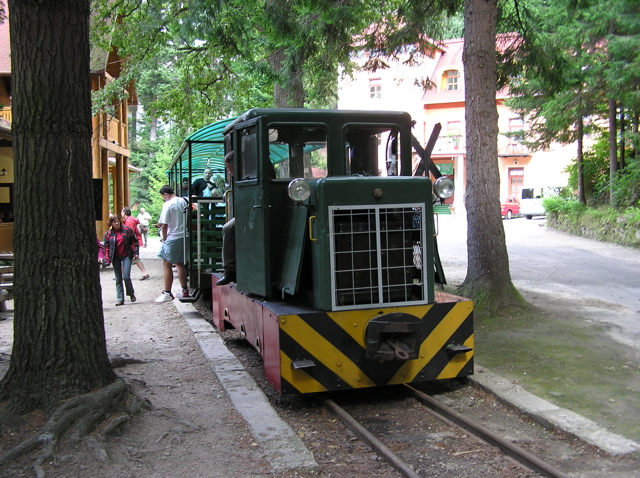

Overview
- Native name: Pálházi Állami Erdei Vasút
- Locale: Hungary
- Coordinates: 48.467°N 21.498°E
- Termini: Pálháza; Rostalló
- Stations: 7
- Website: http://www.eszakerdo.hu/angol/menu/erdvinfo_eng.html

Technical
- Line length: 7 km (4 miles)
- Track gauge: 760 mm (2 ft 5 15/16 in) Bosnian gauge

The Pálházi State Forest Railway (Hungarian: Pálházi Állami Erdei Vasút) is a 760 mm (2 ft 5 15/16 in) narrow gauge railway in Hungary. It is operated by ÉSZAKERDŐ Zrt, who also operate the Lillafüredi Állami Erdei Vasút.

== Motive Power ==
Three C50 diesel locomotive working on the railway: C50-401, C50-402, C50-403.
