= Pere, Hungary =

Pere
- Location of Borsod-Abaúj-Zemplén county in Hungary

- Location of Pere, Hungary
- Coordinates: 48.28417°N 21.12108°E
- Country: Hungary
- County: Borsod-Abaúj-Zemplén

Area
  - Total: 9.53 km^{2} (3.68 sq mi)

Population (2004)
  - Total: 381
  - Density: 39.97/km^{2} (103.5/sq mi)
- Time zone: UTC+1 (CET)
  - Summer (DST): UTC+2 (CEST)
- Postal code: 3853
- Area code: 46

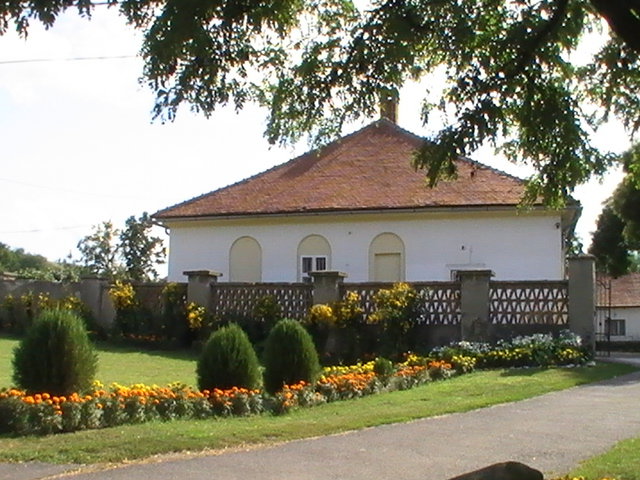

Pere is a village in Borsod-Abaúj-Zemplén county, Hungary.
