= Filkeháza =

Filkeháza Φилкехаза
- Village
- Seal

- Location within Hungary
- Coordinates: 48°29′33.14″N 21°29′33.83″E
- Country: Hungary
- Regions: Northern Hungary
- County: Borsod-Abaúj-Zemplén County

Area
  - Village: 4.44 km^{2} (1.71 sq mi)

Population (2008)
  - Village: 99
  - Metro: 1,934
- Time zone: UTC+1 (CET)
  - Summer (DST): UTC+2 (CEST)

Filkeháza (Rusyn: Φилкехаза) is a village in Borsod-Abaúj-Zemplén County in northeastern Hungary. As of 2008, the village had a population of 99.
