= Vágáshuta =

Vágáshuta Vágašská Huta (in Slovak)
- Village
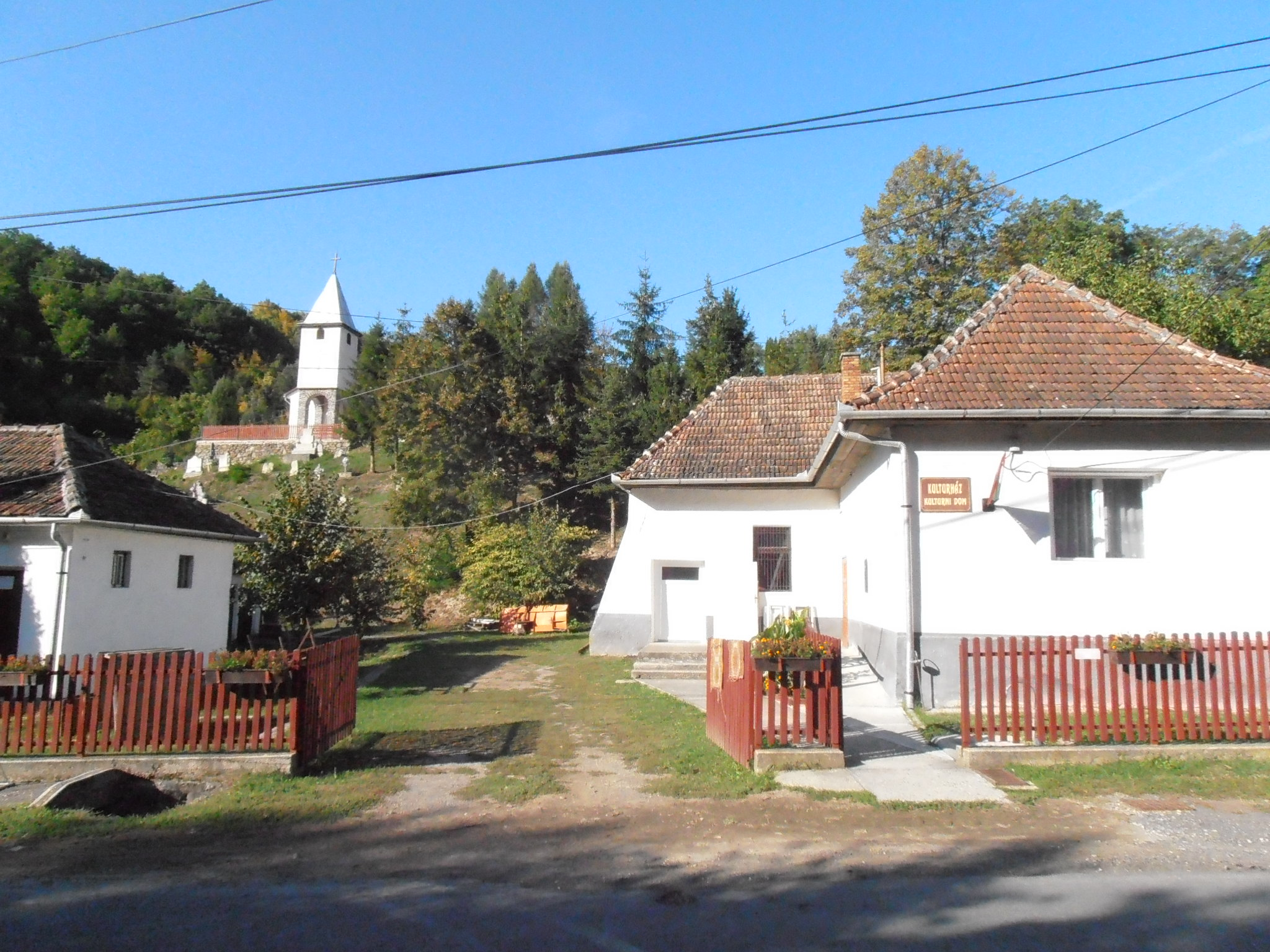

- Flag Coat of arms

- Location of Vágáshuta
- Coordinates: 48.4231°N 21.53865°E
- Country: Hungary
- Region: Northern Hungary
- County: Borsod-Abaúj-Zemplén
- District: Sátoraljaújhely

Area
  - Total: 2.05 km^{2} (0.79 sq mi)

Population (1 January 2026)
  - Total: 82
  - Density: 40/km^{2} (100/sq mi)
- Time zone: UTC+1 (CET)
  - Summer (DST): UTC+2 (CEST)
- Postal code: 3992
- Area code: (+36) 47
- Website: www.vagashuta.hu

Vágáshuta (Slovak: Vágašská Huta) is a village in Borsod-Abaúj-Zemplén County in northeastern Hungary.
