= Vilyvitány =

- Village
- Flag Coat of arms

- Location of Vilyvitány
- Coordinates: 48.49618°N 21.55805°E
- Country: Hungary
- Region: Northern Hungary
- County: Borsod-Abaúj-Zemplén
- District: Sátoraljaújhely

Area
  - Total: 13.12 km^{2} (5.07 sq mi)

Population (1 January 2026)
  - Total: 280
  - Density: 21/km^{2} (55/sq mi)
- Time zone: UTC+1 (CET)
  - Summer (DST): UTC+2 (CEST)
- Postal code: 3991
- Area code: (+36) 47
- Website: vilyvitany.hu

Vilyvitány is a village in Borsod-Abaúj-Zemplén County in northeastern Hungary.
