= Vizsoly =

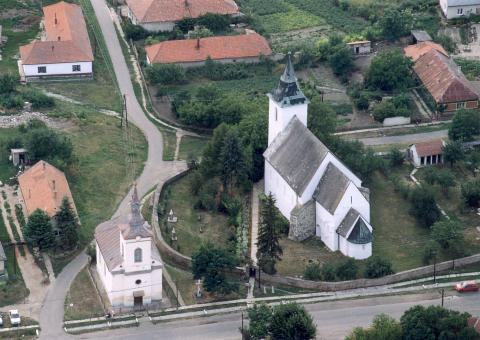

- Location of Borsod-Abaúj-Zemplén county in Hungary

- Location of Vizsoly
- Coordinates: 48.38405°N 21.21510°E
- Country: Hungary
- County: Borsod-Abaúj-Zemplén

Area
  - Total: 18.41 km^{2} (7.11 sq mi)

Population (2004)
  - Total: 917
  - Density: 49.8/km^{2} (129/sq mi)
- Time zone: UTC+1 (CET)
  - Summer (DST): UTC+2 (CEST)
- Postal code: 3888
- Area code: 46

Vizsoly is a village in Borsod-Abaúj-Zemplén county, Hungary.
