= Pusztafalu =

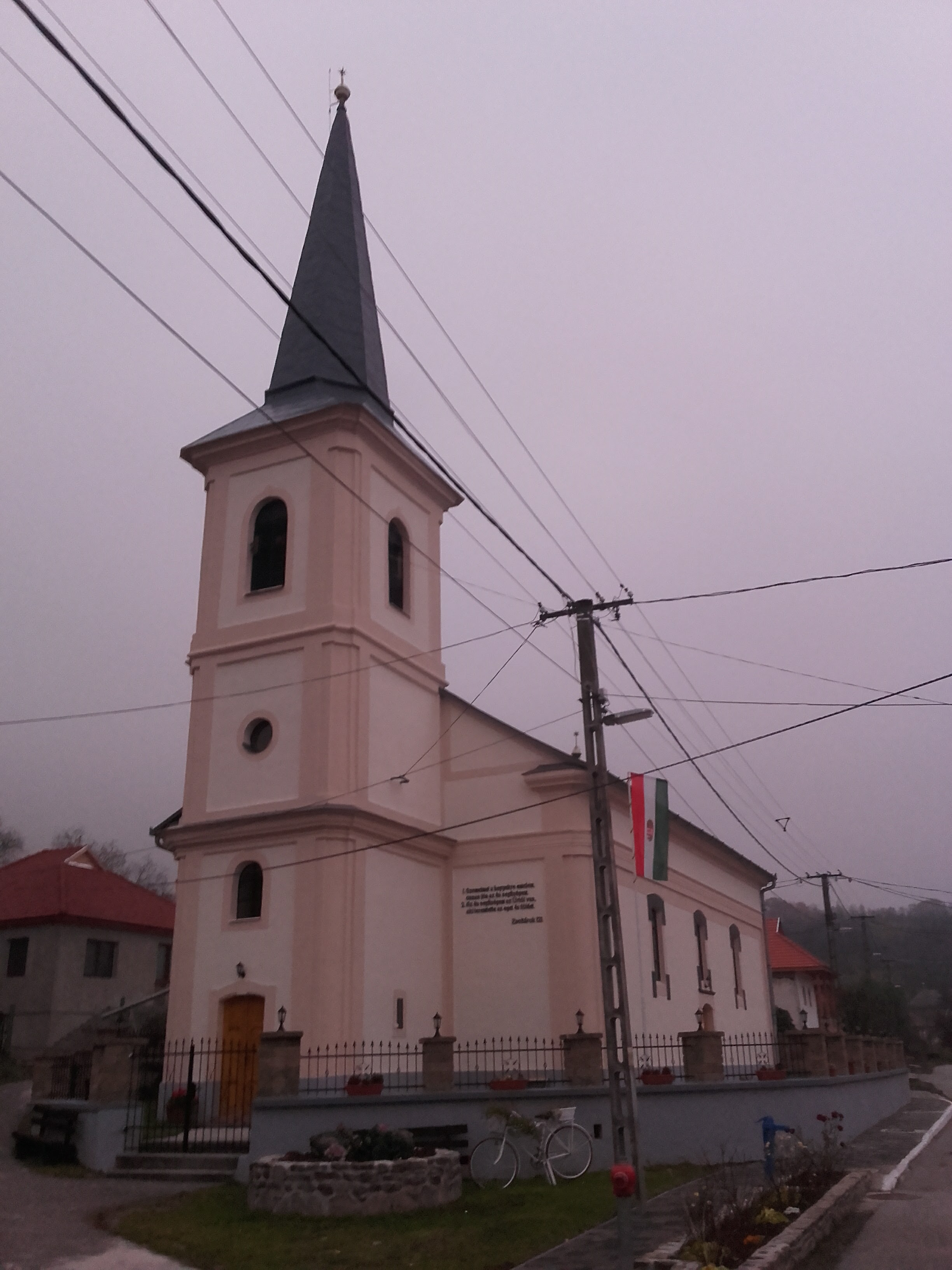
- Church, Pusztafalu

- Flag Seal

- Location of Pusztafalu
- Coordinates: 48.54504°N 21.48591°E
- Country: Hungary
- County: Borsod-Abaúj-Zemplén

Area
  - Total: 7 km^{2} (2.7 sq mi)

Population (2004)
  - Total: 257
  - Density: 36.71/km^{2} (95.1/sq mi)
- Time zone: UTC+1 (CET)
  - Summer (DST): UTC+2 (CEST)
- Postal code: 3995
- Area code: 47

Pusztafalu is a village in Borsod-Abaúj-Zemplén county, Hungary.
