= Felsőberecki =

- Village
- Location within Hungary
- Coordinates: 48°21′41.36″N 21°41′36.71″E
- Country: Hungary
- Regions: Northern Hungary
- County: Borsod-Abaúj-Zemplén County

Area
  - Total: 3.53 km^{2} (1.36 sq mi)

Population (2008)
  - Total: 301
- Time zone: UTC+1 (CET)
  - Summer (DST): UTC+2 (CEST)

Felsőberecki is a village in Borsod-Abaúj-Zemplén County in northeastern Hungary. As of 2008 it had a population of 301.

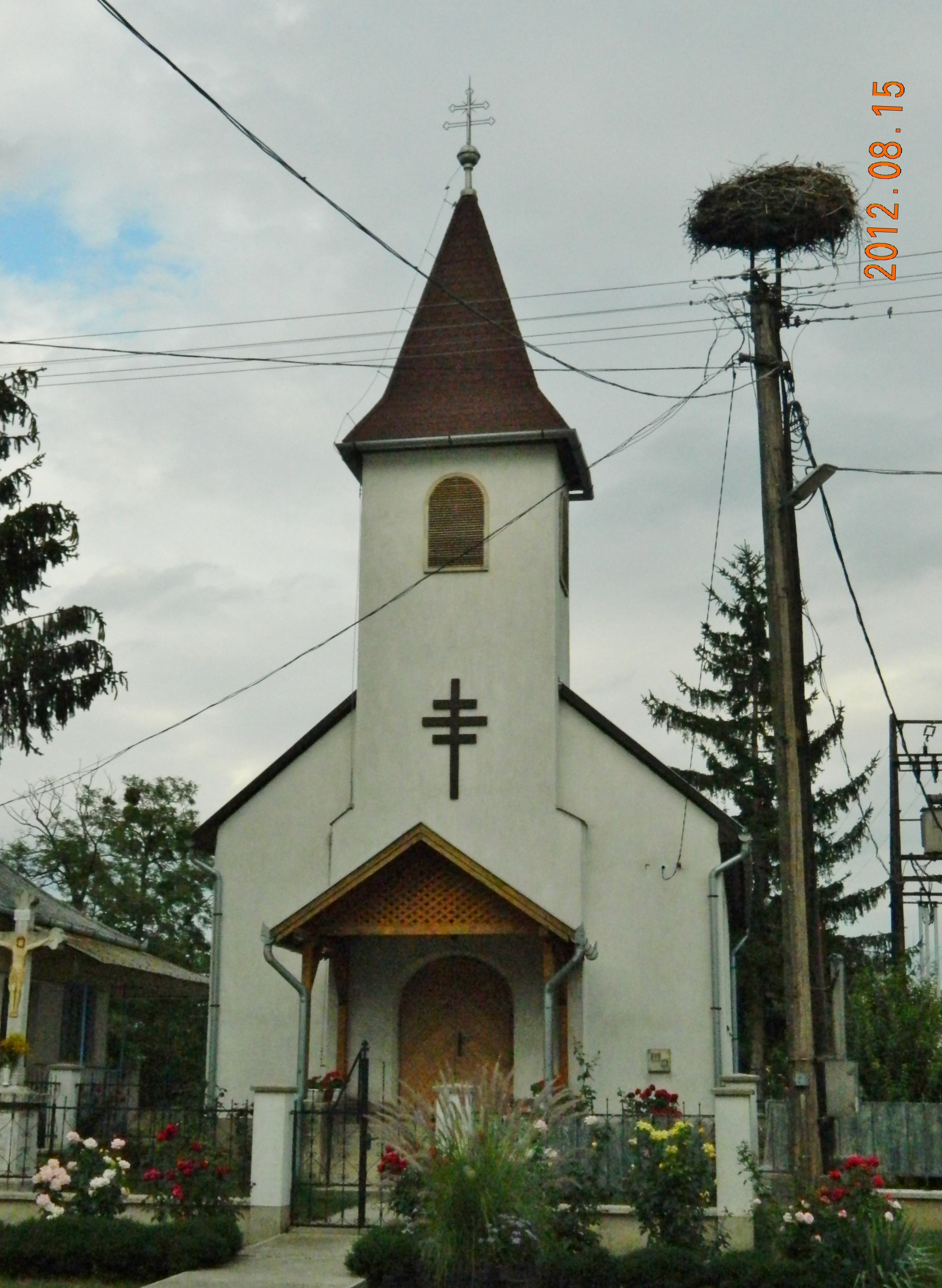
Eastern catholic church

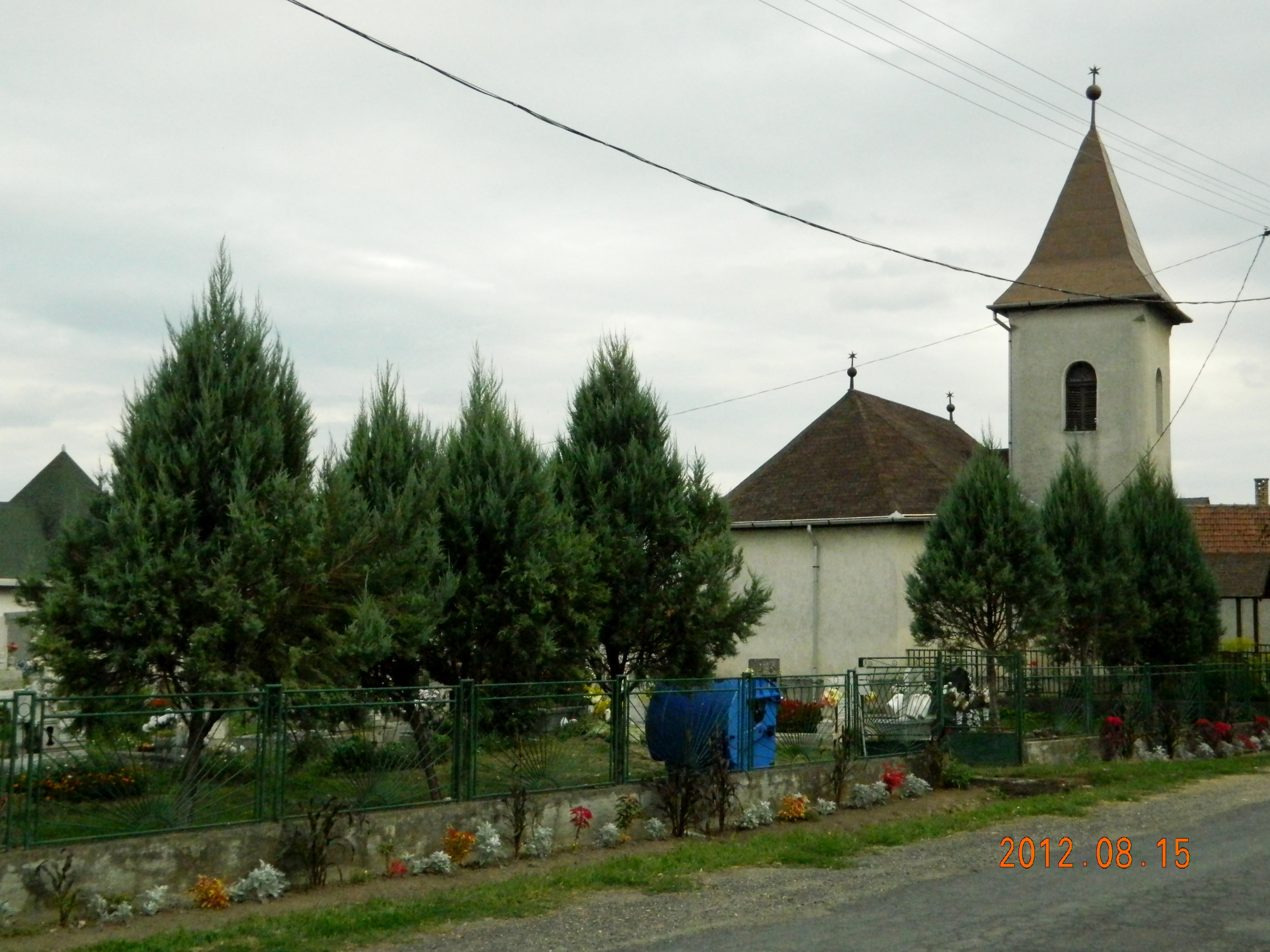
Calvinist church

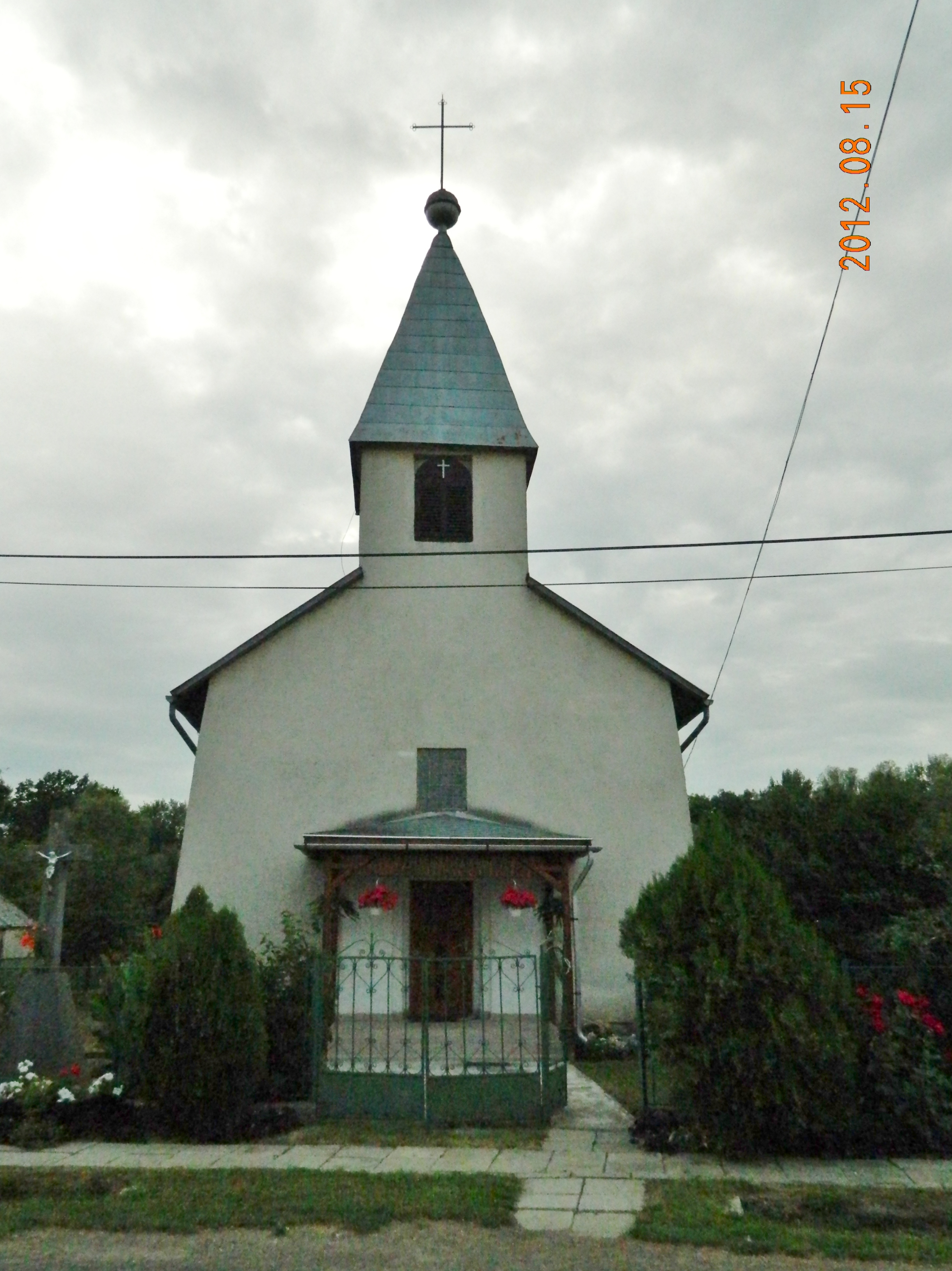
Catholic church
