= Richárd Hörcsik =

Hungarian politician (born 1955)

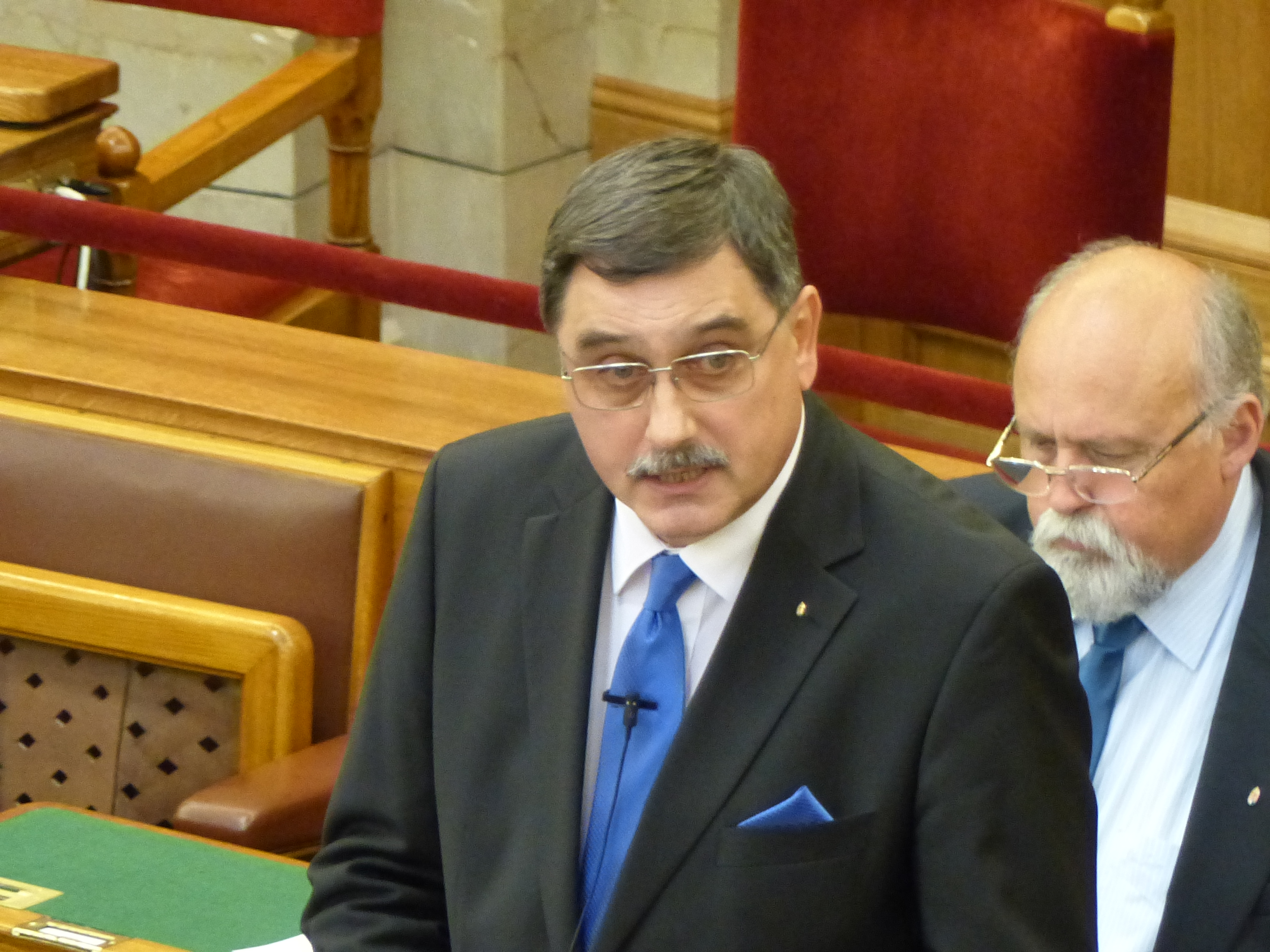

Mayor of Sárospatak
- In office 1 October 2006 – 3 October 2010
- Preceded by: Gábor Jánosdeák
- Succeeded by: János Aros

Member of the National Assembly
- In office 18 June 1998 – 8 May 2026
- In office 2 May 1990 – 27 June 1994

Personal details
- Born: 23 December 1955 (age 70) Sátoraljaújhely, Hungary
- Party: Fidesz (since 1998)
- Other political affiliations: MDF
- Profession: politician

Dr. Richárd Hörcsik (born 23 December 1955) is a Hungarian politician, member of the National Assembly (MP) for Sátoraljaújhely (Borsod-Abaúj-Zemplén County Constituency X then V) from 1998 to 2026. He was also a Member of Parliament from the MDF Borsod-Abaúj-Zemplén County Regional List between 1990 and 1994. He served as Mayor of Sárospatak from 2006 to 2010.

== Political career ==
In 1990 he secured a seat from the Borsod-Abaúj-Zemplén County Regional List of the Hungarian Democratic Forum (MDF). During the same term he was a member of the Delegation to the Council of Europe. In 1994 he unsuccessfully ran to secure a seat in the parliament.

In 1998 and 2002 he managed to secure a seat again as an individual representative for Constituency X, Borsod-Abaúj-Zemplén County. Since 2000 he served as a vice chairman of the Committee on European Integration. At the October 2002 municipal elections he became a member of the Borsod-Abaúj-Zemplén County Assembly. In the course of the development of the organisational structure of Fidesz-Hungarian Civic Union in 2003, he was charged with heading the Debrecen constituency. Upon the invitation of parliamentary faction leader János Áder, at the beginning of September 2004 he took over the chair of the integration cabinet from József Szájer, who had been elected member of the European Parliament. He was elected MP for Sátoraljaújhely in the 2006, 2010, 2014, 2018 and 2022 elections. He served as the Chairman of the Committee on European Affairs from May 2010 to July 2023. He did not run in the 2026 Hungarian parliamentary election.

Political offices
Preceded by Gábor Jánosdeák	Mayor of Sárospatak; 2006–2010	Succeeded by János Aros
