= Nyíri =

Coordinates: 48°30′N 21°27′E

- Village
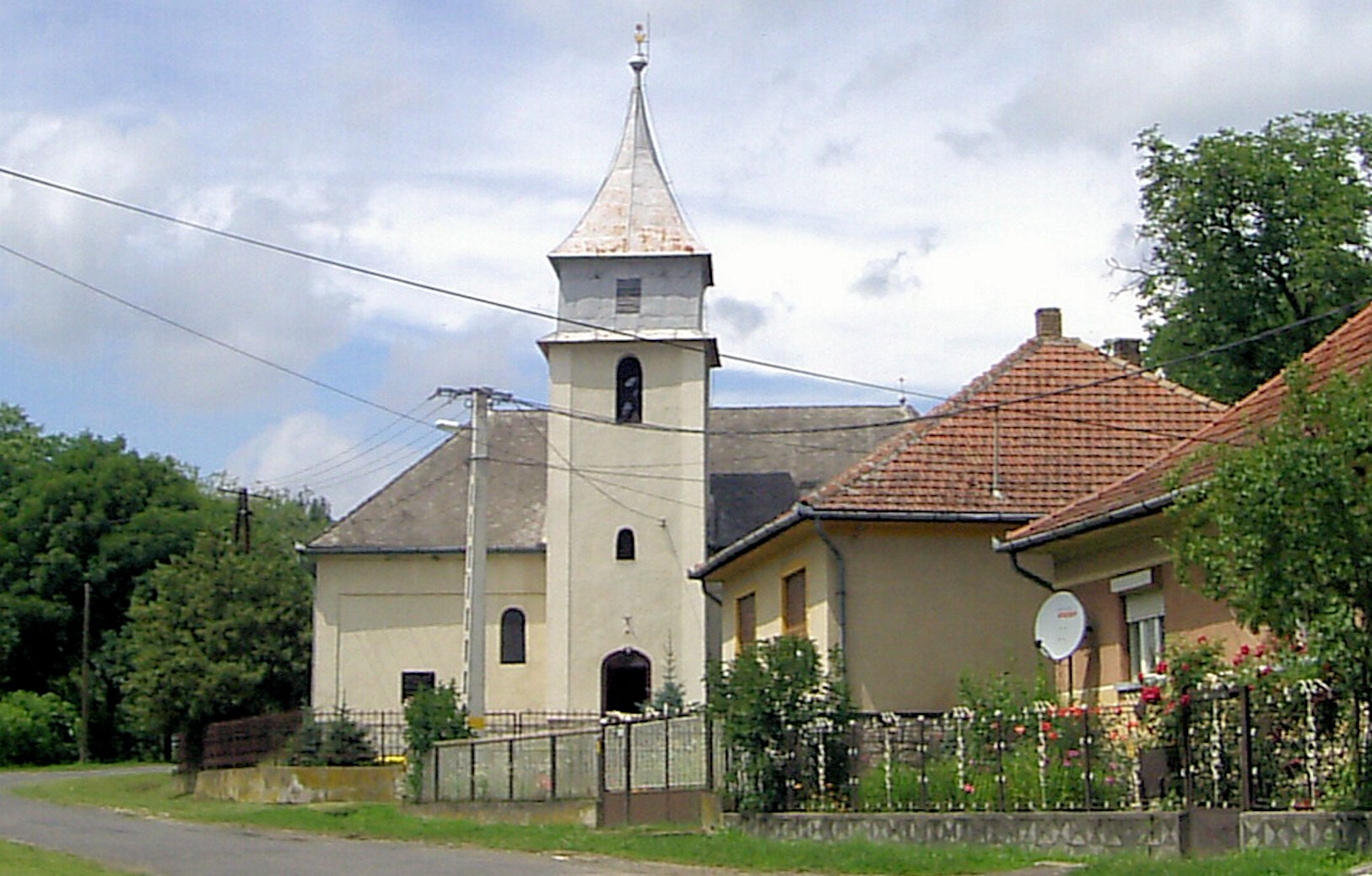
- Reformed Church in Nyíri
- Interactive map of Nyíri
- Country: Hungary
- Regions: Northern Hungary
- County: Borsod-Abaúj-Zemplén County
- Time zone: UTC+1 (CET)
  - Summer (DST): UTC+2 (CEST)

Nyíri is a village in Borsod-Abaúj-Zemplén County in northeastern Hungary.
