= Mikóháza =

- Village
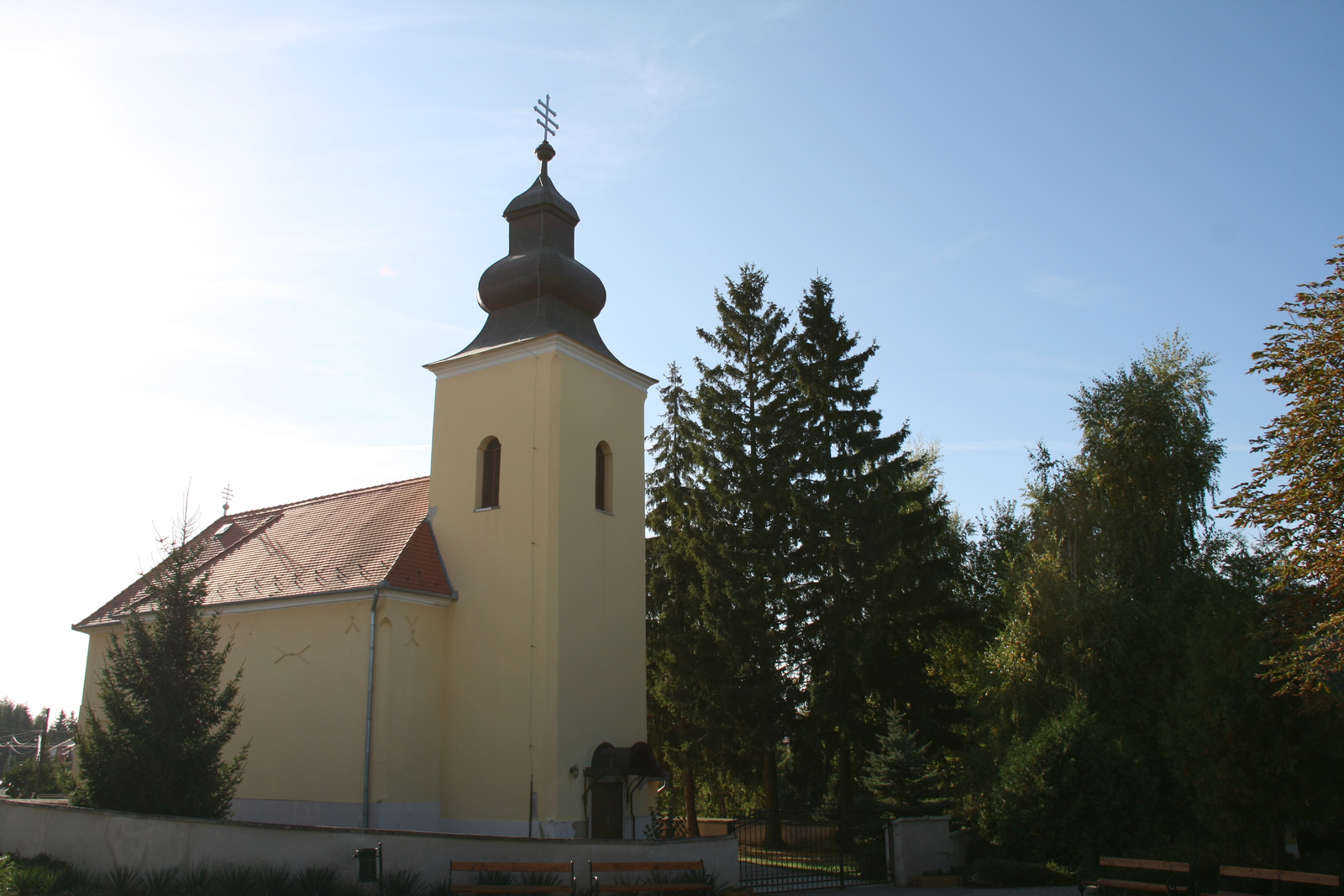

- Flag Coat of arms

- Location of Mikóháza
- Coordinates: 48.46485°N 21.59248°E
- Country: Hungary
- Region: Northern Hungary
- County: Borsod-Abaúj-Zemplén
- District: Sátoraljaújhely

Area
  - Total: 16.91 km^{2} (6.53 sq mi)

Population (1 January 2026)
  - Total: 479
  - Density: 28.3/km^{2} (73.4/sq mi)
- Time zone: UTC+1 (CET)
  - Summer (DST): UTC+2 (CEST)
- Postal code: 3989
- Area code: (+36) 47
- Website: mikohaza.hu

Mikóháza is a village in Borsod-Abaúj-Zemplén County in northeastern Hungary.
