= Szegi =

- Location of Borsod-Abaúj-Zemplén county in Hungary
- Country: Hungary
- County: Borsod-Abaúj-Zemplén

Area
  - Total: 9.05 km^{2} (3.49 sq mi)

Population (2004)
  - Total: 333
  - Density: 36.79/km^{2} (95.3/sq mi)
- Time zone: UTC+1 (CET)
  - Summer (DST): UTC+2 (CEST)
- Postal code: 3918
- Area code: 47

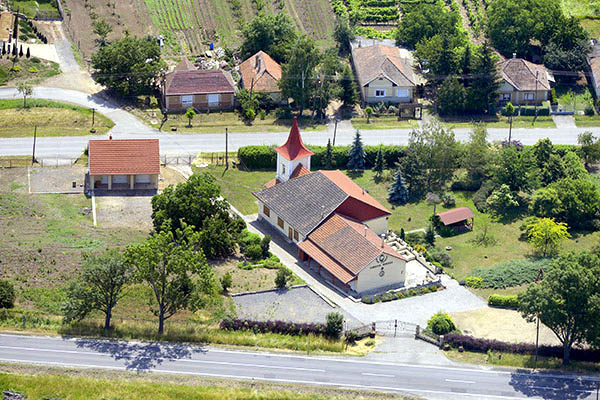
Szegi

Szegi is a village in Borsod-Abaúj-Zemplén county, Hungary.
