= Telkibánya =

- Village
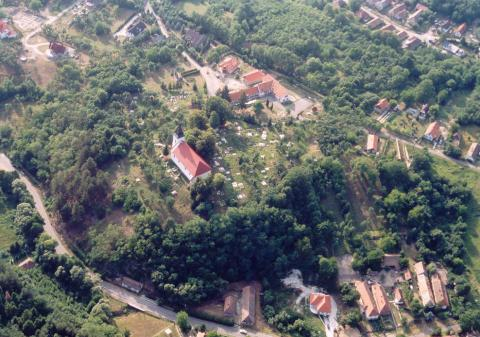
- Aerial photography of Telkibánya

- Flag Coat of arms

- Location of Telkibánya in Hungary
- Coordinates: 48.4829°N 21.3566°E
- Country: Hungary
- Region: Northern Hungary
- County: Borsod-Abaúj-Zemplén

Government
  - Mayor: Lászlóné Mester

Area
  - Total: 46.82 km^{2} (18.08 sq mi)

Population (2015)
  - Total: 549
  - Density: 11.7/km^{2} (30.4/sq mi)
- Time zone: UTC+1 (CET)
  - Summer (DST): UTC+2 (CEST)
- Postal code: 3896
- Area code: +36 46
- Website: https://telkibanya.hu/

Telkibánya is a village in Borsod-Abaúj-Zemplén county, in the Northern Hungary region of northeastern Hungary.

== Geography ==
It covers an area of 46.82 km^{2} (18 sq mi) and has a population of 549 people (2015).

== Places of interest ==
- Protestant cemetery and church
- St. Catherine zion
- Mining Museum
- Ruins of Koncfalva
- Ice cave
- Mining pits and former gold washing claims
- Surface minerals
- Surface perlite flow

== Gallery ==
Photos of Telkibánya

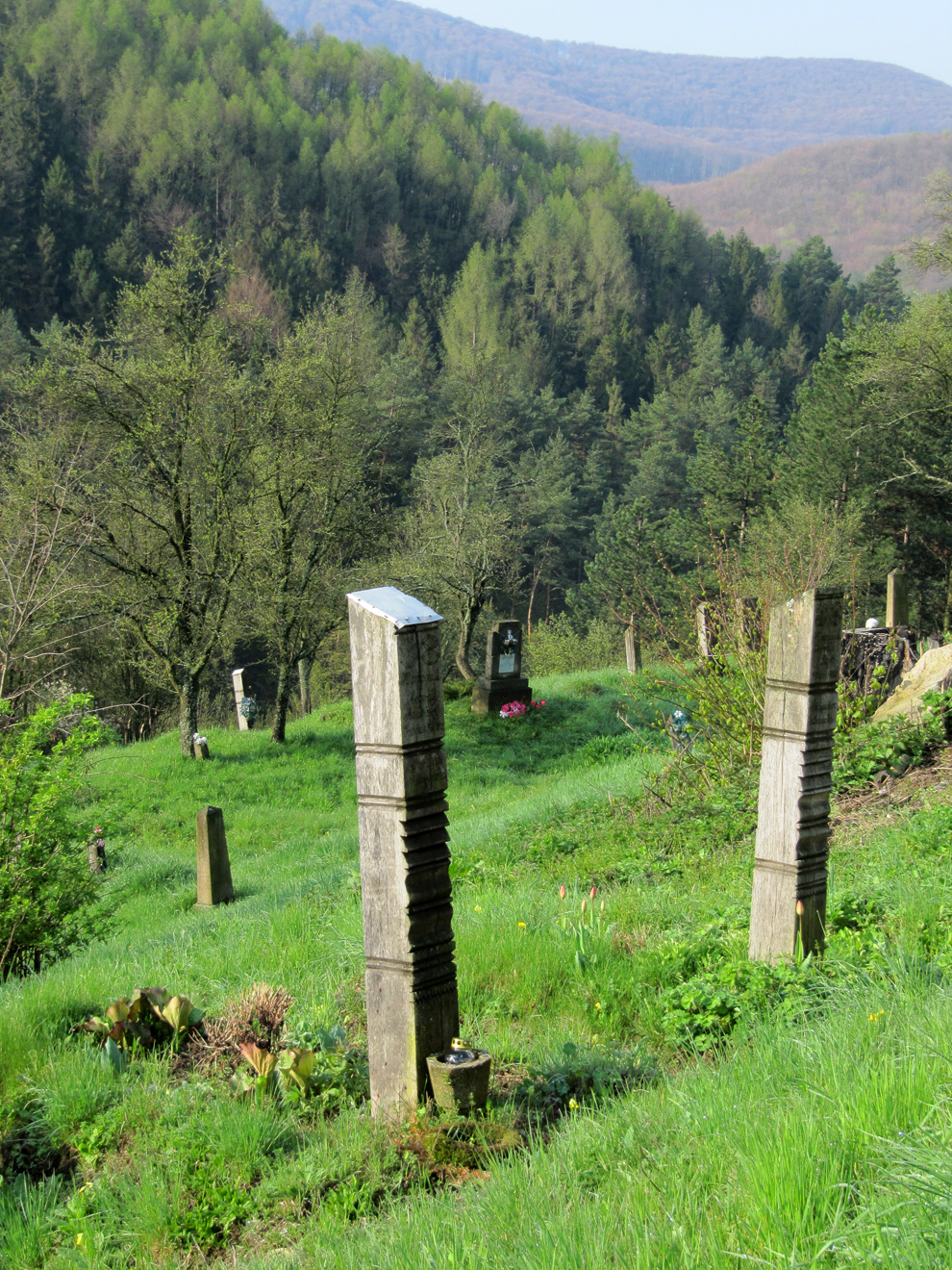
Protestant cemetery

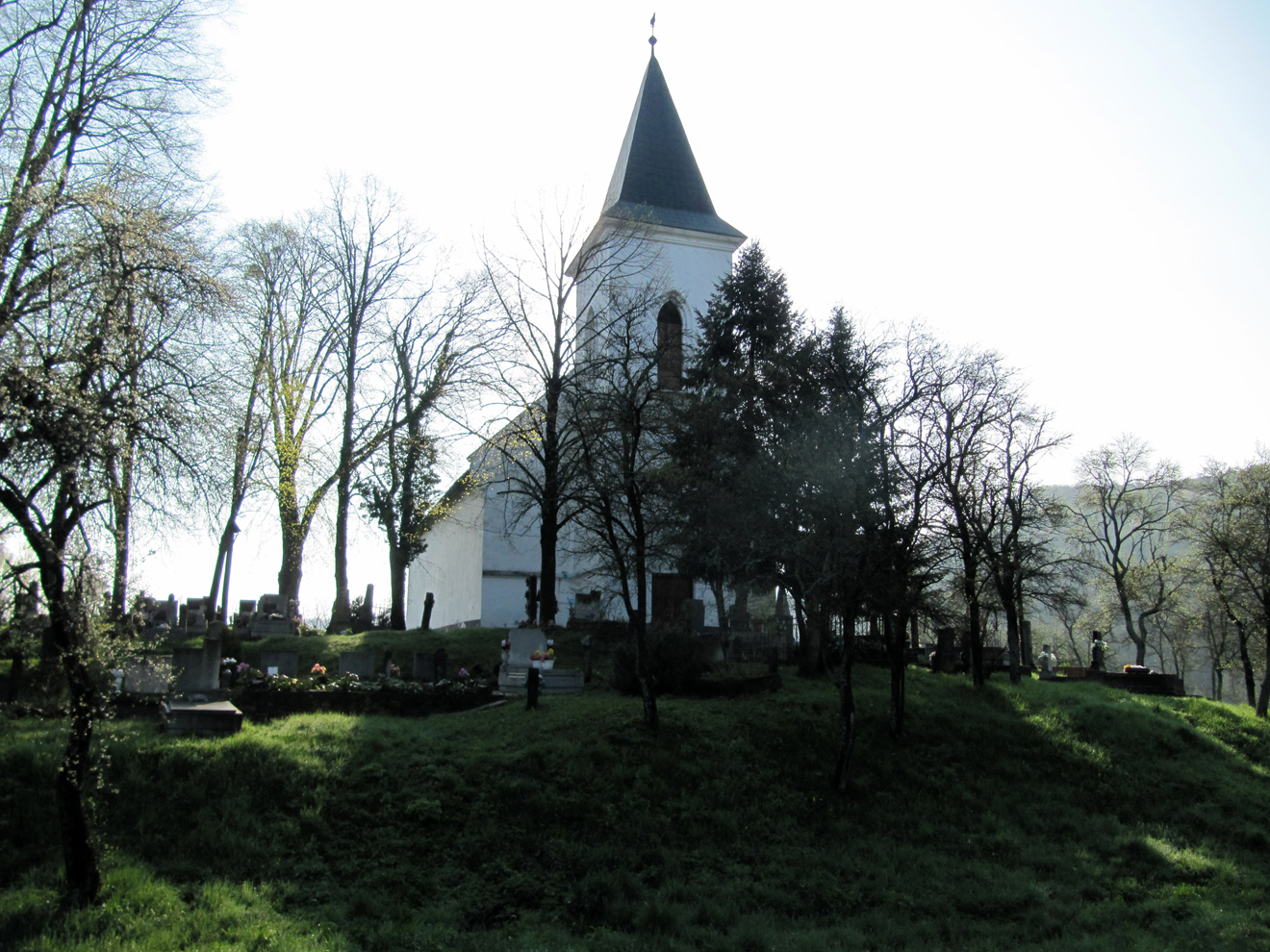
Protestant church

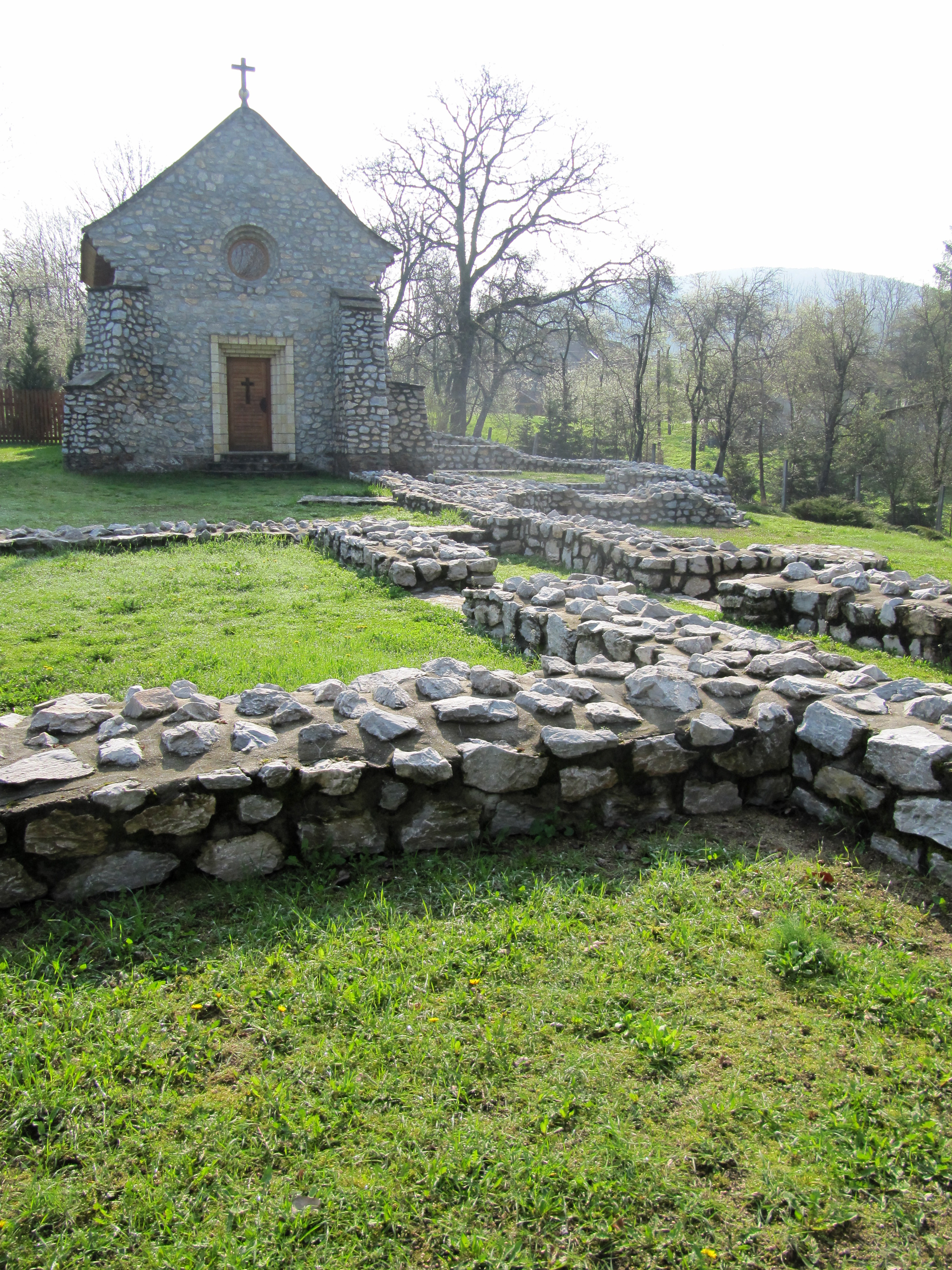
runes and St. Catherine zion

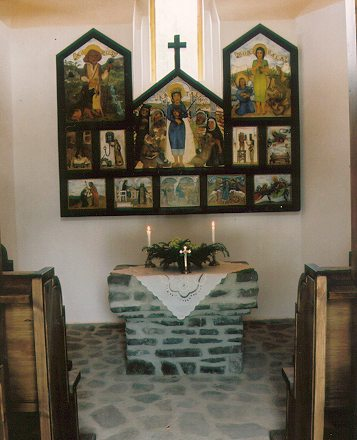
Altar of St. Catherine painted by Zoltán Joó

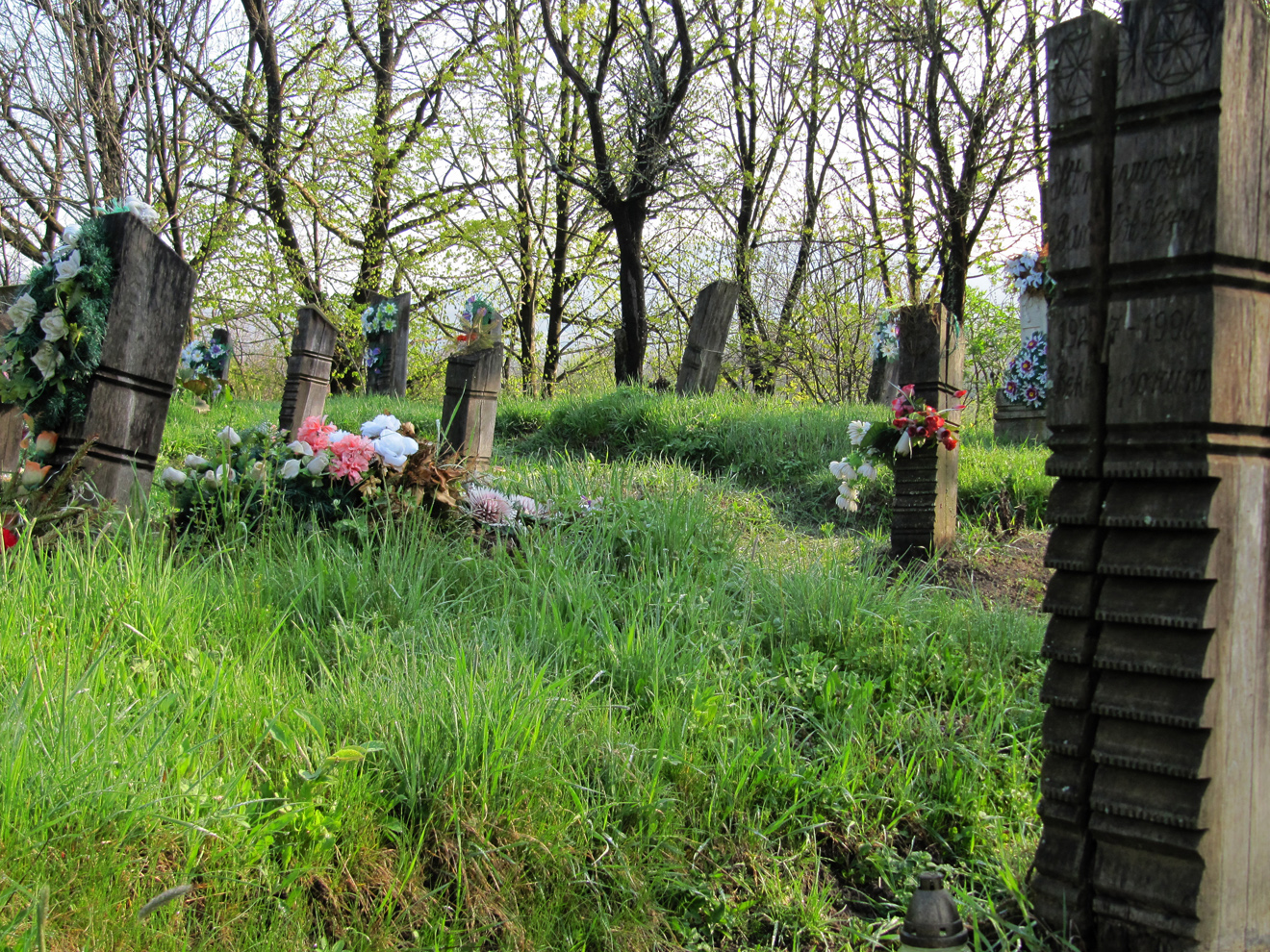
Cemetery at the Protestant church

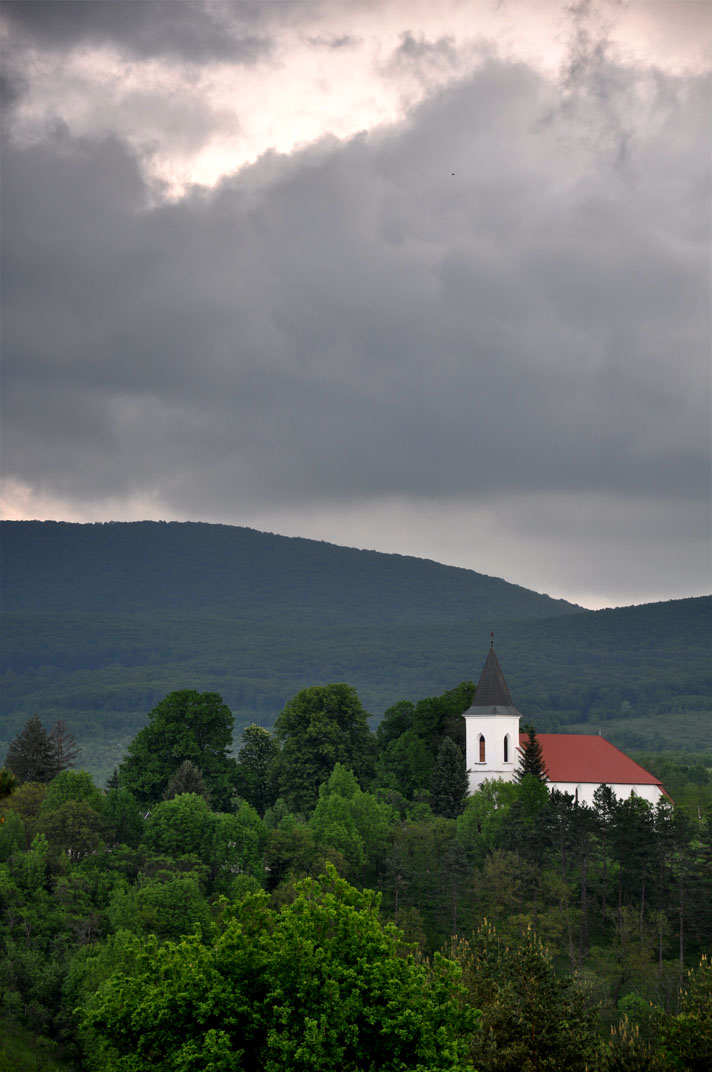
Protestant church from the Bizsóka

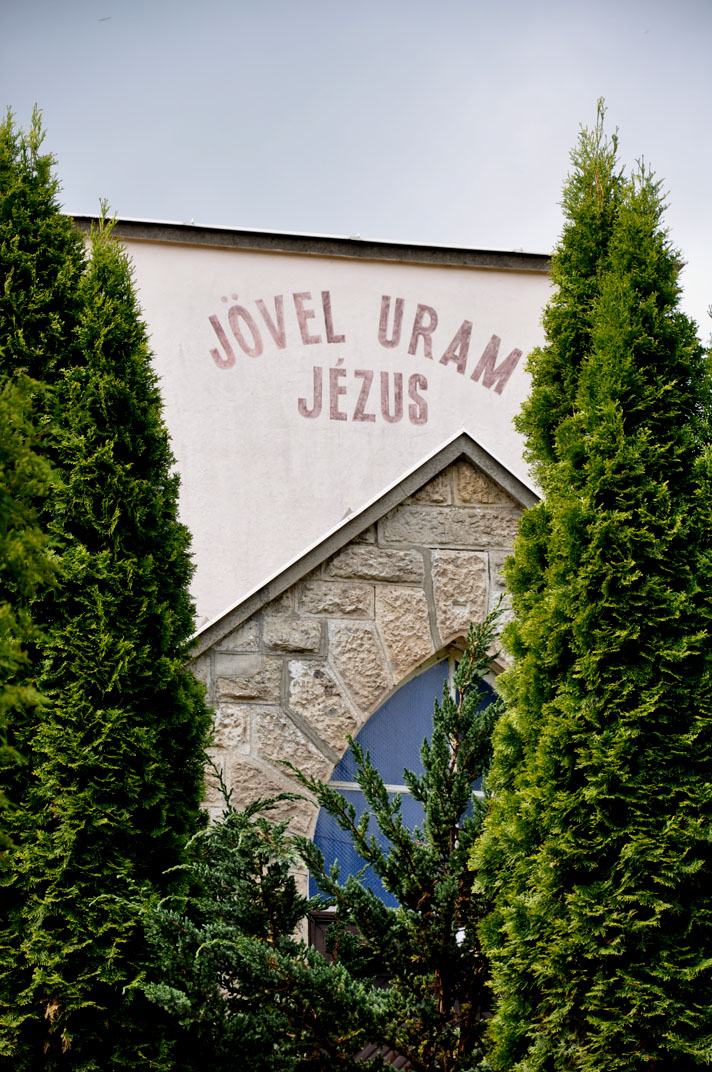
Unitarist church front
