= Füzérkomlós =

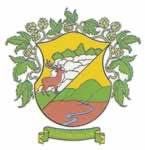
- Seal

- Location of county in Hungary

- Location of Füzérkomlós
- Coordinates: 48.51183°N 21.45412°E
- Country: Hungary
- County: Borsod-Abaúj-Zemplén

Area
  - Total: 5.87 km^{2} (2.27 sq mi)

Population (2004)
  - Total: 387
  - Density: 65.92/km^{2} (170.7/sq mi)
- Time zone: UTC+1 (CET)
  - Summer (DST): UTC+2 (CEST)
- Postal code: 3997
- Area code: 47

Füzérkomlós is a village in Borsod-Abaúj-Zemplén county, Hungary.
