= Göncruszka =

- Village
- Flag Coat of arms

- Location of Göncruszka
- Coordinates: 48.44713°N 21.23878°E
- Country: Hungary
- Region: Northern Hungary
- County: Borsod-Abaúj-Zemplén
- District: Gönc

Area
  - Total: 16.69 km^{2} (6.44 sq mi)

Population (1 January 2025)
  - Total: 653
  - Density: 39.1/km^{2} (101/sq mi)
- Time zone: UTC+1 (CET)
  - Summer (DST): UTC+2 (CEST)
- Postal code: 3894
- Area code: (+36) 46
- Website: goncruszka.net

Göncruszka is a village in Borsod-Abaúj-Zemplén county, Hungary.
