= Vilmány =

Coordinates: 48°25′N 21°14′E

- Village
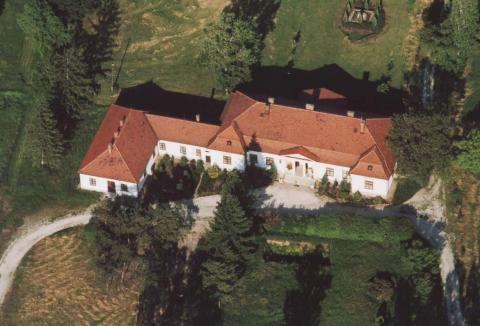
- Vilmány légifotó
- Interactive map of Vilmány
- Country: Hungary
- Regions: Northern Hungary
- County: Borsod-Abaúj-Zemplén County
- Time zone: UTC+1 (CET)
  - Summer (DST): UTC+2 (CEST)

Vilmány is a village in Borsod-Abaúj-Zemplén County in northeastern Hungary.
