= Füzérkajata =

- Seal

- Location of Borsod-Abaúj-Zemplén county in Hungary

- Location of Füzérkajata
- Coordinates: 48.51830°N 21.50094°E
- Country: Hungary
- County: Borsod-Abaúj-Zemplén

Area
  - Total: 11.46 km^{2} (4.42 sq mi)

Population (2004)
  - Total: 136
  - Density: 11.86/km^{2} (30.7/sq mi)
- Time zone: UTC+1 (CET)
  - Summer (DST): UTC+2 (CEST)
- Postal code: 3994
- Area code: 47

Füzérkajata is a village in Borsod-Abaúj-Zemplén county, Hungary.
