= Nagyhuta =

- Flag Coat of arms

- Location of Borsod-Abaúj-Zemplén county in Hungary

- Location of Nagyhuta
- Coordinates: 48.42823°N 21.49350°E
- Country: Hungary
- County: Borsod-Abaúj-Zemplén

Area
  - Total: 35.05 km^{2} (13.53 sq mi)

Population (2004)
  - Total: 83
  - Density: 2.36/km^{2} (6.1/sq mi)
- Time zone: UTC+1 (CET)
  - Summer (DST): UTC+2 (CEST)
- Postal code: 3994
- Area code: 47

Nagyhuta (Slovak: Veľká Huta) is a village in Borsod-Abaúj-Zemplén county, Hungary.
