= Szalaszend =

- Location of Borsod-Abaúj-Zemplén county in Hungary

- Location of Szalaszend
- Coordinates: 48.38604°N 21.12314°E
- Country: Hungary
- County: Borsod-Abaúj-Zemplén

Area
  - Total: 18.22 km^{2} (7.03 sq mi)

Population (2004)
  - Total: 1,118
  - Density: 61.36/km^{2} (158.9/sq mi)
- Time zone: UTC+1 (CET)
  - Summer (DST): UTC+2 (CEST)
- Postal code: 3863
- Area code: 46

Szalaszend is a village in Borsod-Abaúj-Zemplén county, Hungary.

== History of Szalaszend ==
The first known mention of the former parts of the settlement in Szalaszend comes from the 13th century. Subsequently, the area was considered to be the property of the Holy Nobility. After the extinction of the Szendi family, the settlement moved to the Kálla. The Turkish occupation period was a difficult time for the settlements: Felsőszend was the victim of the arson of Turkish troops in 1573 and the other two settlements were almost depopulated. It was not until the beginning of the 18th century that the area began to be re-populated.

The churches of today's settlement are the Reformed churches of Upper and Lower Saints. Originally built in the 15th century, the former Gothic Calvinist church in Lower Süd was rebuilt in its 18th-century Baroque style. There is a Gothic window on the south side of the ship, a tombstone on the wall around 1630 and a pulpit in 1817. The Upper Sanctuary's Reformed Church was built in Baroque style, and was not acquired until the 19th century. The interior features a baroque painted wooden ceiling and pulpit dating from the 18th century.

The present settlement was established in 1936 by the unification of the villages of Szala, Alsószend and Felsőszend.

The name of this village was mentioned as early as 1264 in a charter under the name Zaladienses (Zala). The first historical trace is from the beginning of the 15th century. In 1427 it was owned by László Piros, with 7 portanyi estates. In 1479 Bálint Huszti received it as a new donation from King Matthias. from the Beekeepers' family in the village. The landlord also had the Bakó family in Alszetenye around 1489. It was the scene of constant battles during the Hussite wars. It was inhabited only in the same state in 1726. The Reformed church was built around 1782–1786, and its population reached the village by way of settlement - 447 persons, mainly of the Reformed religion. 56, that is, 5-6 families usually lived in a house, and around 1830 a manor house was built, the landlord was the Turánszky family. In 869 it had 388 inhabitants and in 1920 it had 423 inhabitants, in 1878 flooding of the river Hernád destroyed many houses in the village. In 1935 it had 3 middle owners, 86 of the villagers participated in the World War and 9 died heroically.
