= Szegilong =

- Location of Borsod-Abaúj-Zemplén county in Hungary

- Location of Szegilong
- Coordinates: 48.21653°N 21.39791°E
- Country: Hungary
- County: Borsod-Abaúj-Zemplén

Area
  - Total: 6.94 km^{2} (2.68 sq mi)

Population (2004)
  - Total: 236
  - Density: 34/km^{2} (88/sq mi)
- Time zone: UTC+1 (CET)
  - Summer (DST): UTC+2 (CEST)
- Postal code: 3918
- Area code: 47

Szegilong is a village in Borsod-Abaúj-Zemplén county, Hungary.
