= Karos, Hungary =

Karos
- Village
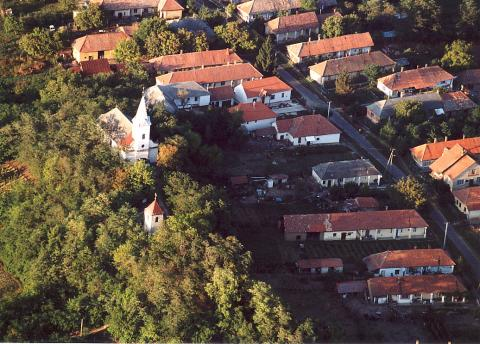
- Aerial photography of Karos

- Flag Coat of arms

- Location of Karos
- Coordinates: 48.32999°N 21.73936°E
- Country: Hungary
- Region: Northern Hungary
- County: Borsod-Abaúj-Zemplén
- District: Cigánd

Area
  - Total: 15.33 km^{2} (5.92 sq mi)

Population (1 January 2026)
  - Total: 491
  - Density: 32.0/km^{2} (83.0/sq mi)
- Time zone: UTC+1 (CET)
  - Summer (DST): UTC+2 (CEST)
- Postal code: 3962
- Area code: (+36) 47

Karos is a village in Borsod-Abaúj-Zemplén county, Hungary.
