= Hernádszurdok =

Coordinates: 48°29′N 21°13′E

- Village
- Interactive map of Hernádszurdok
- Country: Hungary
- Regions: Northern Hungary
- County: Borsod-Abaúj-Zemplén County
- Time zone: UTC+1 (CET)
  - Summer (DST): UTC+2 (CEST)

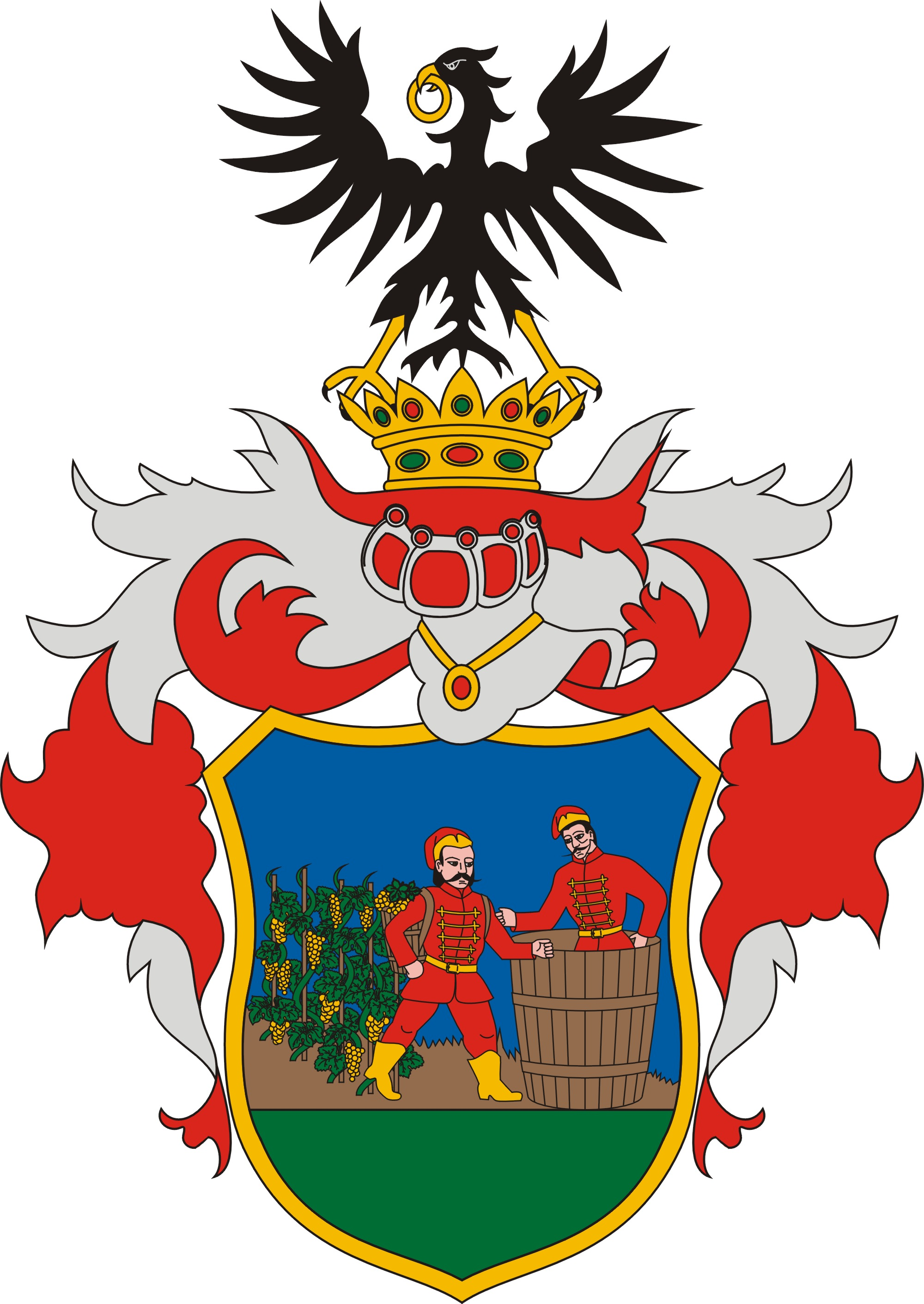
File:HUN Hernádszurdok Címer.svg should be used instead of this png

Hernádszurdok is a village in Borsod-Abaúj-Zemplén County in northeastern Hungary.
