= Novajidrány =

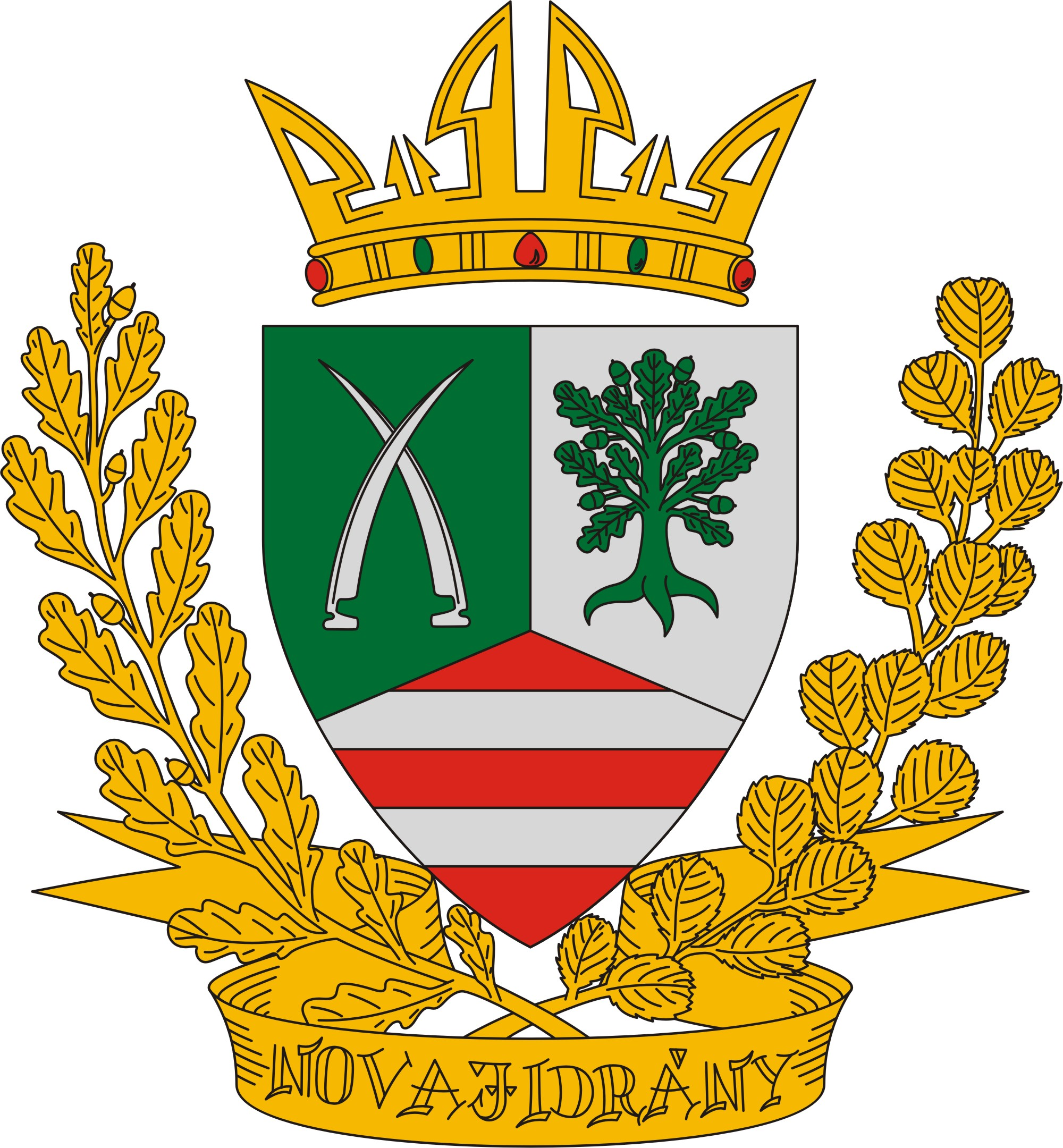
- Coat of arms

- Location of Novajidrány in Hungary
- Coordinates: 48.40305°N 21.17058°E
- Country: Hungary
- Region: Northern Hungary
- County: Borsod-Abaúj-Zemplén
- Subregion: Encsi
- Rank: Village

Area
  - Total: 14.31 km^{2} (5.53 sq mi)

Population (1 January 2008)
  - Total: 1,429
  - Density: 99.86/km^{2} (258.6/sq mi)
- Time zone: UTC+1 (CET)
  - Summer (DST): UTC+2 (CEST)
- Postal code: 3872
- Area code: +36 46
- KSH code: 27191
- Website: http://www.novajidrany.hu

Novajidrány is a country village in northern Hungary.

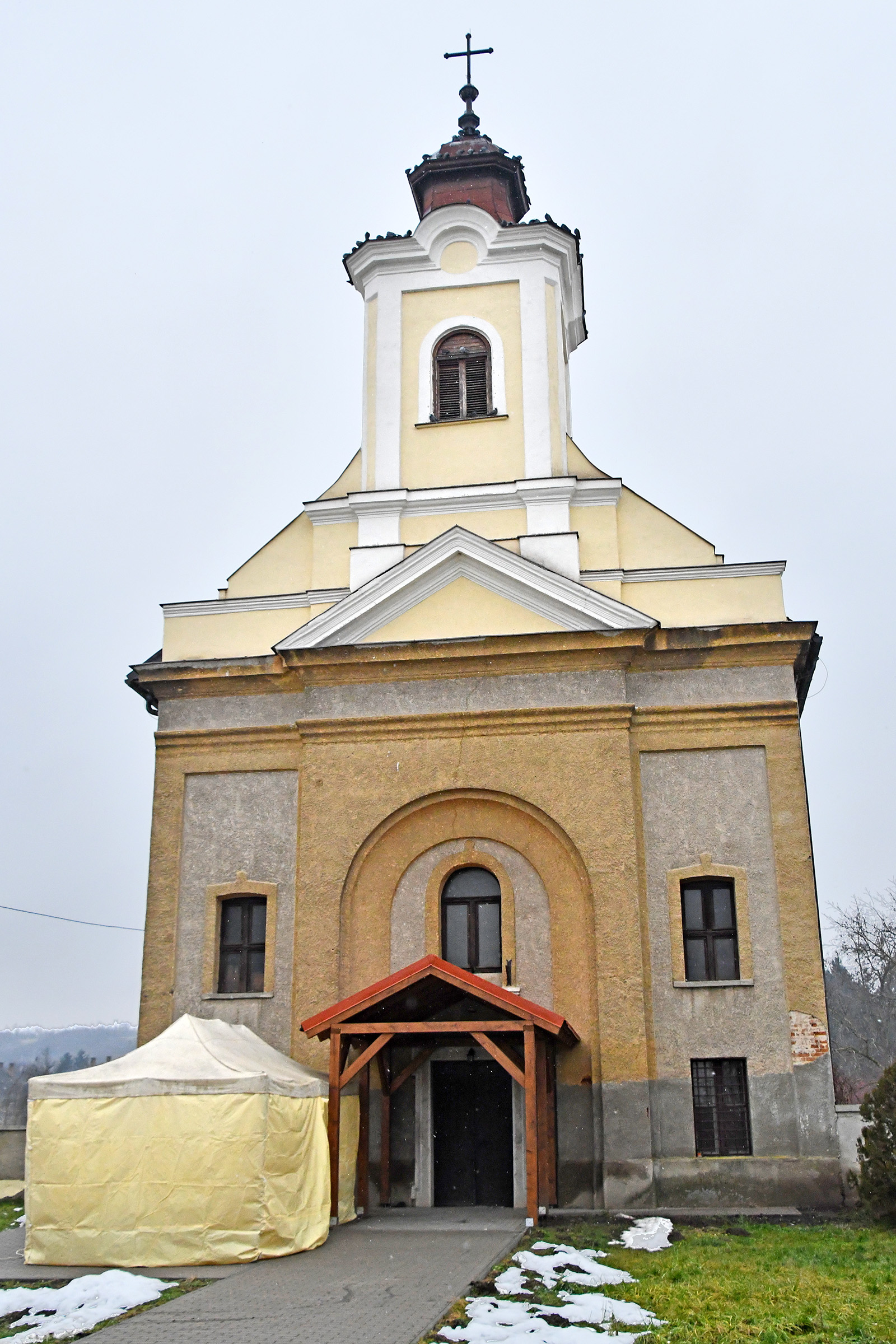
Novajidrány Roman Catholic church
