= Kishuta =

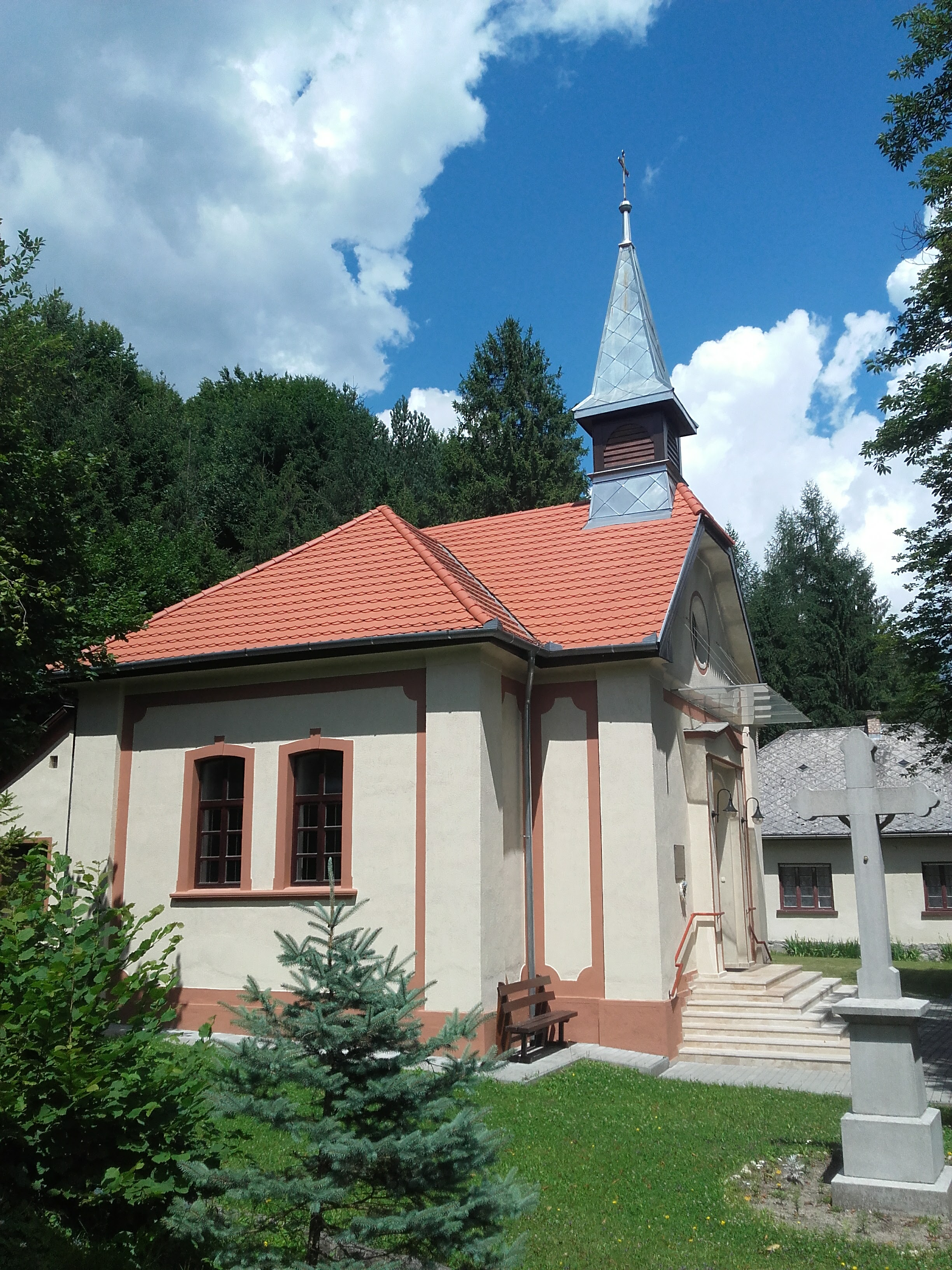
- Church in Kishuta

- Location of Borsod-Abaúj-Zemplén county in Hungary

- Location of Kishuta
- Coordinates: 48.44700°N 21.48048°E
- Country: Hungary
- County: Borsod-Abaúj-Zemplén

Area
  - Total: 5.17 km^{2} (2.00 sq mi)

Population (2004)
  - Total: 344
  - Density: 66.53/km^{2} (172.3/sq mi)
- Time zone: UTC+1 (CET)
  - Summer (DST): UTC+2 (CEST)
- Postal code: 3994
- Area code: 47

Kishuta is a village in Borsod-Abaúj-Zemplén county, Hungary.
