= Bózsva =

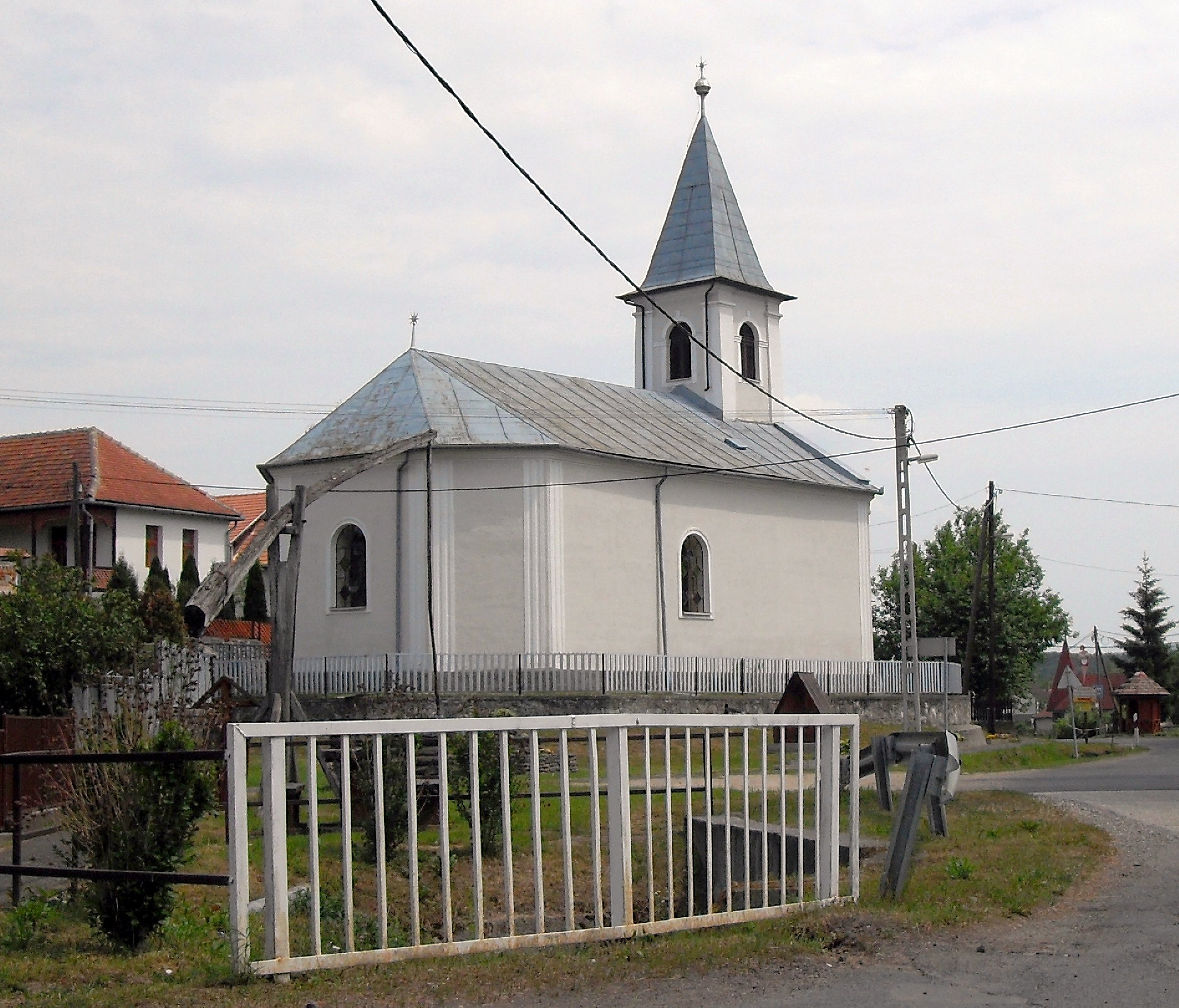

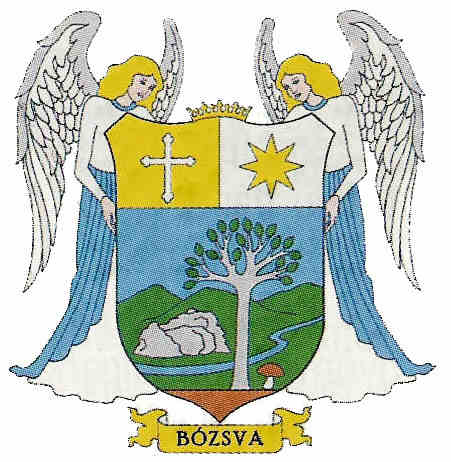
- Coat of arms

- Location of Borsod-Abaúj-Zemplén county in Hungary

- Location of Bózsva
- Coordinates: 48.474681°N 21.4675°E
- Country: Hungary
- County: Borsod-Abaúj-Zemplén

Area
  - Total: 16.39 km^{2} (6.33 sq mi)

Population (2004)
  - Total: 214
  - Density: 13.05/km^{2} (33.8/sq mi)
- Time zone: UTC+1 (CET)
  - Summer (DST): UTC+2 (CEST)
- Postal code: 3994
- Area code: 47

Bózsva is a village in Borsod-Abaúj-Zemplén county, Hungary.
