= Borsod-Abaúj-Zemplén County 3rd constituency =

Hungarian legislative district

Borsod-Abaúj-Zemplén County 3rd constituency (Ózd)
- Constituency for the National Assembly
- Location of Borsod-Abaúj-Zemplén county 03 within Borsod-Abaúj-Zemplén county

- Location of Borsod-Abaúj-Zemplén county within Hungary
- County: Borsod-Abaúj-Zemplén
- Electorate: 72,530 (2018)
- Major settlements: Ózd

Current constituency
- Created: 2011
- Party: Fidesz–KDNP
- Member: Gábor Csuzda
- Created from: Constituency no. 5; Constituency no. 6; Constituency no. 7; Constituency no. 8
- Elected: 2026

The 3rd constituency of Borsod-Abaúj-Zemplén County (Hungarian: Borsod-Abaúj-Zemplén megyei 03. számú országgyűlési egyéni választókerület) is one of the single member constituencies of the National Assembly, the national legislature of Hungary. The constituency standard abbreviation: Borsod-Abaúj-Zemplén 03. OEVK.

Since 2026, it has been represented by Gábor Csuzda of the Fidesz–KDNP party alliance.

== Geography ==
The 3rd constituency is located in the north-western part of Borsod-Abaúj-Zemplén County.

=== List of municipalities ===
The constituency includes the following municipalities:

1. Aggtelek
2. Alsószuha
3. Alsótelekes
4. Arló
5. Bánréve
6. Becskeháza
7. Bódvalenke
8. Bódvarákó
9. Bódvaszilas
10. Borsodbóta
11. Borsodnádasd
12. Borsodszentgyörgy
13. Bükkmogyorósd
14. Csernely
15. Csokvaomány
16. Domaháza
17. Dövény
18. Dubicsány
19. Égerszög
20. Farkaslyuk
21. Felsőkelecsény
22. Felsőnyárád
23. Felsőtelekes
24. Gömörszőlős
25. Hangony
26. Hét
27. Hidvégardó
28. Imola
29. Jákfalva
30. Járdánháza
31. Jósvafő
32. Kánó
33. Kelemér
34. Királd
35. Kissikátor
36. Komjáti
37. Kurityán
38. Lénárddaróc
39. Martonyi
40. Nekézseny
41. Ormosbánya
42. Ózd
43. Perkupa
44. Putnok
45. Ragály
46. Rudabánya
47. Sajógalgóc
48. Sajókaza
49. Sajómercse
50. Sajónémeti
51. Sajópüspöki
52. Sajóvelezd
53. Sáta
54. Serényfalva
55. Szalonna
56. Szendrő
57. Szin
58. Szinpetri
59. Szögliget
60. Szőlősardó
61. Szuhafő
62. Szuhogy
63. Teresztenye
64. Tornakápolna
65. Tornanádaska
66. Tornaszentandrás
67. Trizs
68. Uppony
69. Varbóc
70. Zádorfalva
71. Zubogy

== History ==
The current 3rd constituency of Borsod-Abaúj-Zemplén County was created in 2011 and contains the pre-2011 5th constituency and parts of the pre-2011 6th, 7th and 8th constituencies of Borsod-Abaúj-Zemplén County. Its borders have not changed since its creation.

== Members ==
The constituency was first represented by Gábor Riz of the Fidesz from 2014, and he was re-elected in 2018 and 2022. In the 2026 election, Gábor Csuzda of the Fidesz was elected representative.

| Election | Member | Party | % | Ref. |
|---|---|---|---|---|
| 2014 | Gábor Riz | Fidesz | 37.76 | |
| 2018 | Gábor Riz | Fidesz | 48.10 | |
| 2022 | Gábor Riz | Fidesz | 58.93 | |
| 2026 | Gábor Csuzda | Fidesz | 46.76 | |

== Election result ==
=== 2014 election ===
2014 parliamentary election: Borsod-Abaúj-Zemplén County - 3rd constituency
| Party | Candidate | Votes | % | ±% |
|---|---|---|---|---|
| Fidesz–KDNP | Gábor Riz | 15,473 | 37.76 | |
| Jobbik | Zsolt Egyed | 12,148 | 29.64 | |
| Unity | István Nyakó | 10,146 | 24.46 | |
| LMP | Imre Szilágyi | 612 | 1.49 | |
| Workers' Party | Béla Kónya | 474 | 1.16 | |
| MCP | Csaba Harkály | 350 | 0.85 | |
| Soc Dems | József Gál | 341 | 0.83 | |
| Nemzeti Forr.Párt | András Kisgergely | 248 | 0.61 | |
| FKGP | István Greskovits | 230 | 0.56 | |
| Together 2014 | Zsolt Siroki | 183 | 0.45 | |
| Motherland Party | Dénes Károly Andrássy | 133 | 0.32 | |
| JESZ | Melinda Anna Tóth | 133 | 0.32 | |
| SMS | Anikó Rézműves | 125 | 0.31 | |
| Independent | Antal László Császár | 124 | 0.3 | |
| SZDP | Sándor József Orliczki | 103 | 0.25 | |
| SEM | Zsolt Forray | 80 | 0.2 | |
| KTI | Lajos Béla Vágó | 46 | 0.11 | |
| ÚDP | Csaba Lázi | 18 | 0.04 | |
| ÚNP | András Gömöri | 13 | 0.03 | |
| MACSEP | Géza Seres | 0 | 0.0 | |
| Majority | | 3,325 | 8.12 | |
| Turnout | | 41,530 | 53.58 | |
| Registered electors | | 77,515 | | |
| Fidesz–KDNP win (new seat) | | | | |
