= Edelény Subregion =

Coordinates: 48°23′N 20°47′E

Edelény Subregion Borsod-Abaúj-Zemplén sixth largest of the subregions of Hungary. Area : 783,21 km². Population : 36 155 (2009)

Settlements:

- Abod
- Balajt
- Becskeháza
- Bódvalenke
- Bódvarákó
- Bódvaszilas
- Boldva
- Borsodszirák
- Damak
- Debréte
- Edelény
- Égerszög
- Galvács
- Hangács
- Hegymeg
- Hidvégardó
- Irota
- Jósvafő
- Komjáti
- Ládbesenyő
- Lak
- Martonyi
- Meszes
- Nyomár
- Perkupa
- Rakaca
- Rakacaszend
- Szakácsi
- Szalonna
- Szendrő
- Szendrőlád
- Szin
- Szinpetri
- Szögliget
- Szőlősardó
- Szuhogy
- Teresztenye
- Tomor
- Tornabarakony
- Tornakápolna
- Tornanádaska
- Tornaszentandrás
- Tornaszentjakab
- Varbóc
- Viszló
- Ziliz

== See also ==
- Edelény District (from 2013)
