= Edelény District =

Coordinates: 48.3833°N 20.7833°E

Edelény District Edelényi járás
- Districts of Hungary
- Coat of arms

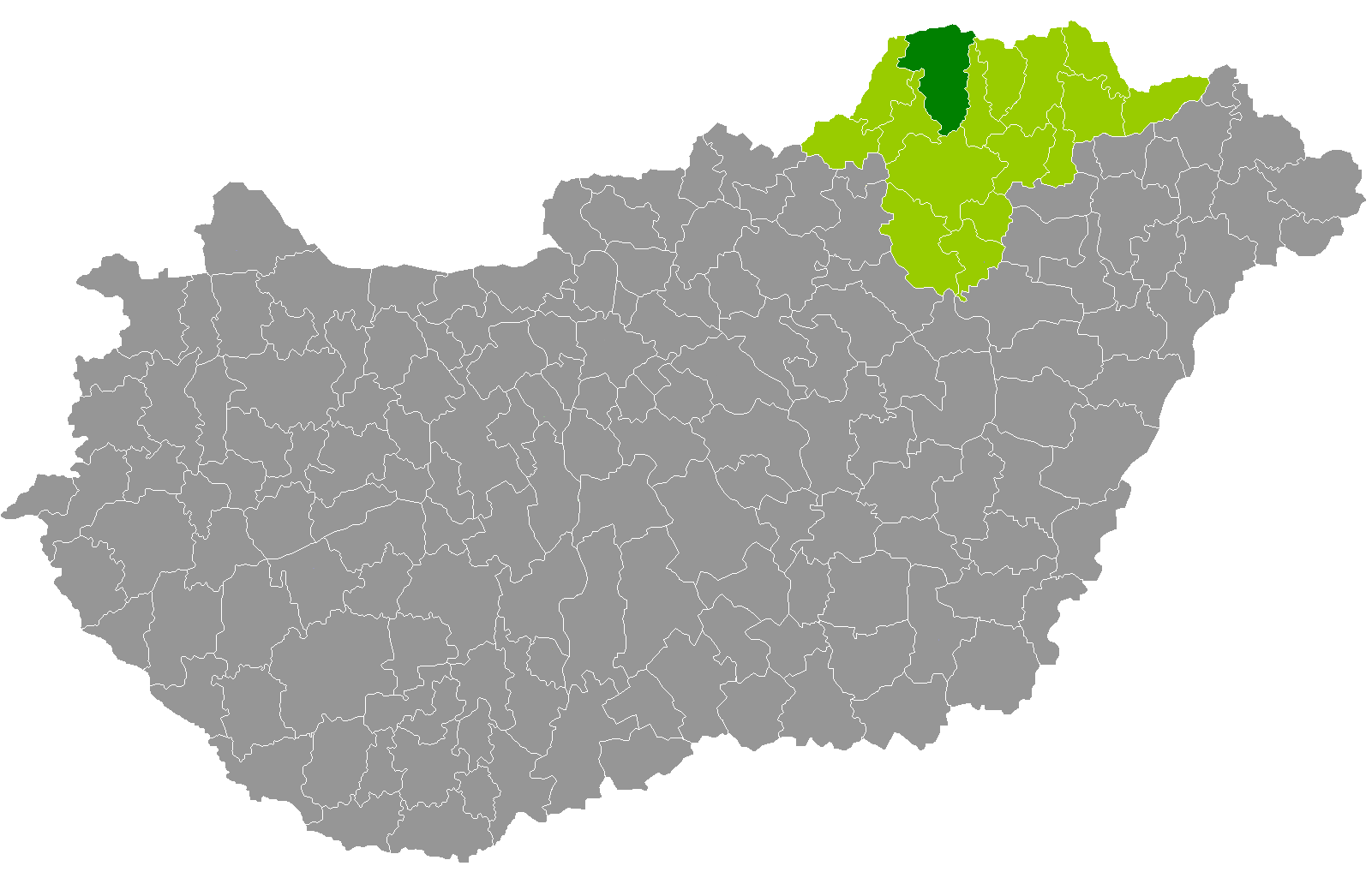
- Edelény District within Hungary and Borsod-Abaúj-Zemplén County.
- Country: Hungary
- County: Borsod-Abaúj-Zemplén
- District seat: Edelény

Area
  - Total: 717.86 km^{2} (277.17 sq mi)
  - Rank: 3rd in Borsod-Abaúj-Zemplén

Population (2011 census)
  - Total: 33,314
  - Rank: 6th in Borsod-Abaúj-Zemplén
  - Density: 46/km^{2} (120/sq mi)

Edelény (Hungarian: Edelényi járás) is a district in northern part of Borsod-Abaúj-Zemplén County. Edelény is also the town where the district seat is found. The district is located in the Northern Hungary statistical region.

== Geography ==
Edelény District borders with the Slovak Košice Region to the north, Encs District and Szikszó District to the east, Miskolc District to the south, Kazincbarcika District and Putnok District to the west. The number of the inhabited places in Edelény District is 45.

== Municipalities ==
The district has two towns (bolded) and 43 villages. (ordered by population, as of 1 January 2012)

- Abod (229)
- Balajt (463)
- Becskeháza (44)
- Boldva (2,331)
- Bódvalenke (184)
- Bódvarákó (94)
- Bódvaszilas (1,005)
- Borsodszirák (1,199)
- Damak (234)
- Debréte (21)
- **Edelény** (10,019) – district seat
- Égerszög (43)
- Galvács (91)
- Hangács (573)
- Hegymeg (104)
- Hidvégardó (507)
- Irota (67)
- Komjáti (254)
- Lak (604)
- Ládbesenyő (271)
- Martonyi (374)
- Meszes (157)
- Nyomár (327)
- Perkupa (819)
- Rakaca (725)
- Rakacaszend (338)
- Szakácsi (132)
- Szalonna (1,027)
- **Szendrő** (4,062)
- Szendrőlád (2,062)
- Szin (738)
- Szinpetri (220)
- Szögliget (606)
- Szőlősardó (100)
- Szuhogy (1,184)
- Teresztenye (20)
- Tomor (219)
- Tornabarakony (15)
- Tornakápolna (23)
- Tornanádaska (688)
- Tornaszentandrás (193)
- Tornaszentjakab (203)
- Varbóc (46)
- Viszló (62)
- Ziliz (348)

== Demographics ==
Religion in Edelény District (2011 census)
1. Catholic Church (45.7%)
2. Greek Catholicism (7.40%)
3. Calvinism (20.0%)
4. Other religions (0.90%)
5. Non-religious (6.80%)
6. Atheists (0.40%)
7. Undeclared (18.8%)

In 2011, it had a population of 33,314 and the population density was 46/km².

| Year | County population | Change |
|---|---|---|
| 2011 | 33,314 | n/a |

=== Ethnicity ===
Besides the Hungarian majority, the main minorities are the Roma (approx. 6,000), Polish and Rusyn (150) and German (130).

Total population (2011 census): 33,314
Ethnic groups (2011 census): Identified themselves: 36,295 persons:

- Hungarians: 29,602 (81.56%)
- Gypsies: 6,052 (16.67%)
- Others and indefinable: 641 (1.77%)

Approx. 3,000 persons in Edelény District did declare more than one ethnic group at the 2011 census.

=== Religion ===
Religious adherence in the county according to 2011 census:

- Catholic – 17,695 (Roman Catholic – 15,213; Greek Catholic – 2,480);
- Reformed – 6,666;
- other religions – 308;
- Non-religious – 2,251;
- Atheism – 120;
- Undeclared – 6,274.

== Gallery ==
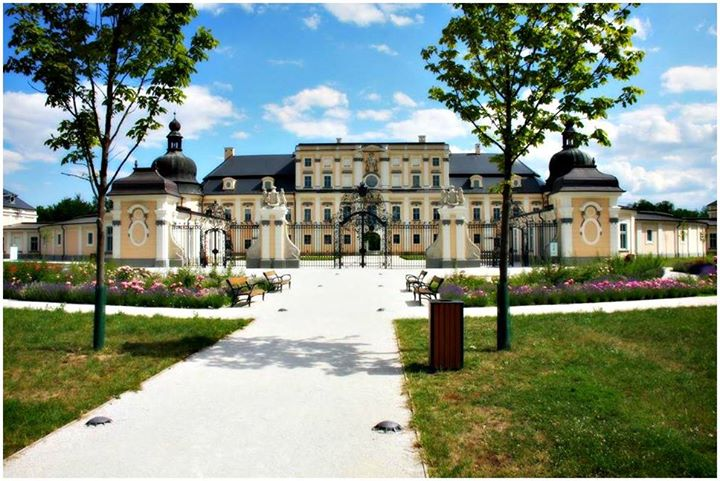
L'Huillier-Coburg Palace in Edelény

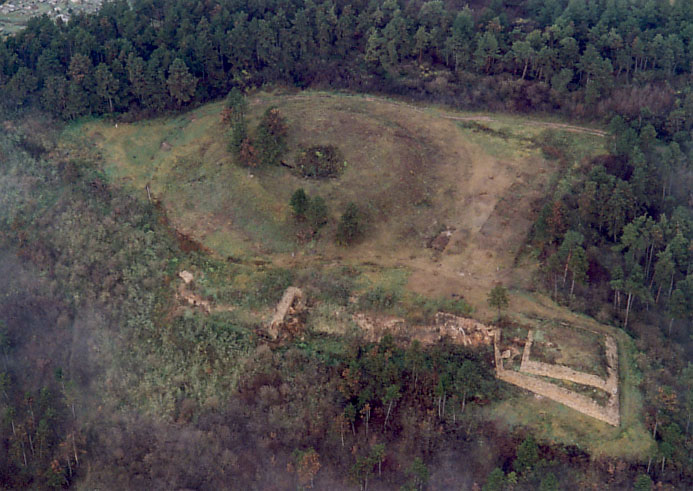
Ruins of Szendrő Castle

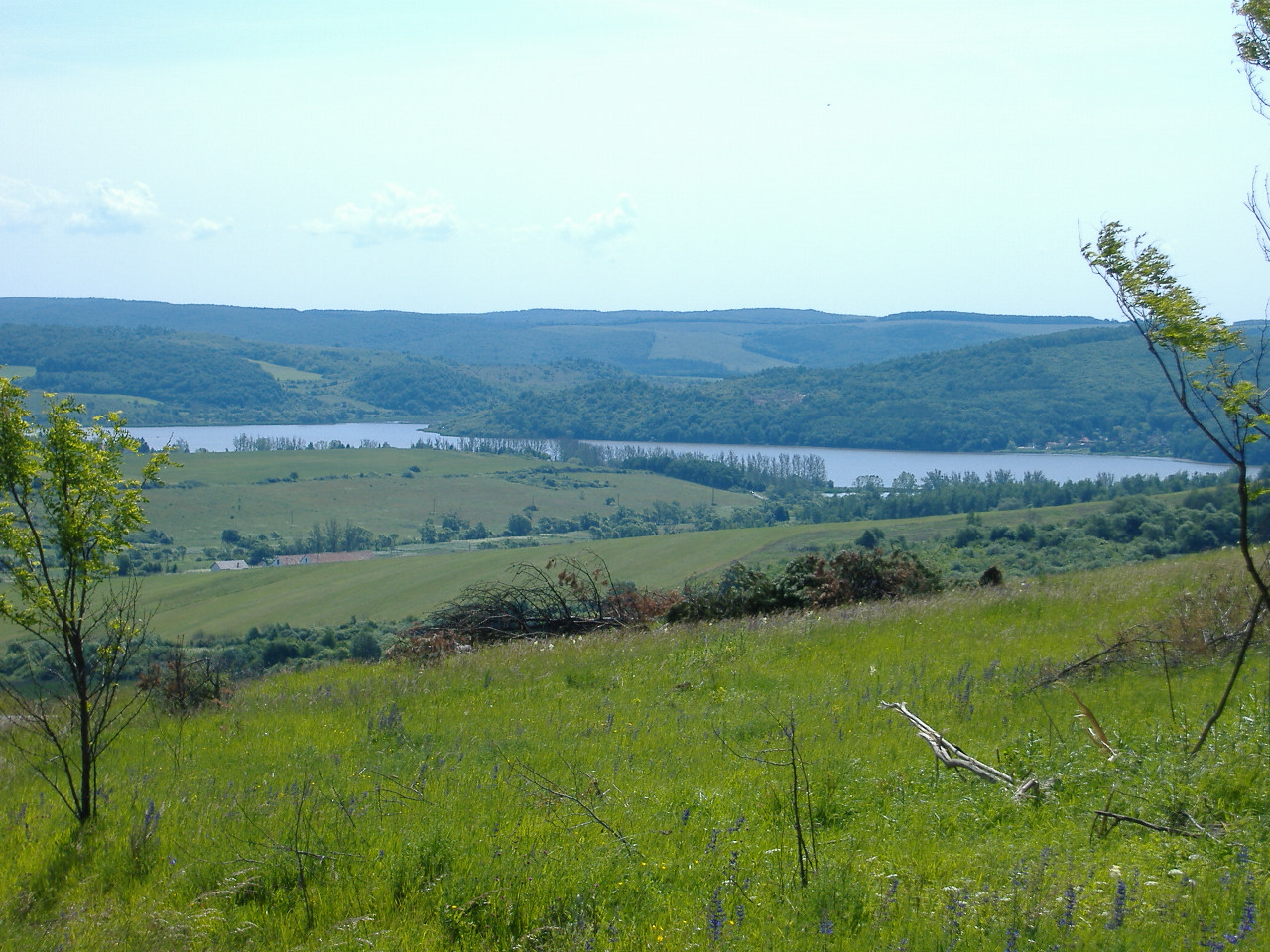
Reservoir near Rakaca

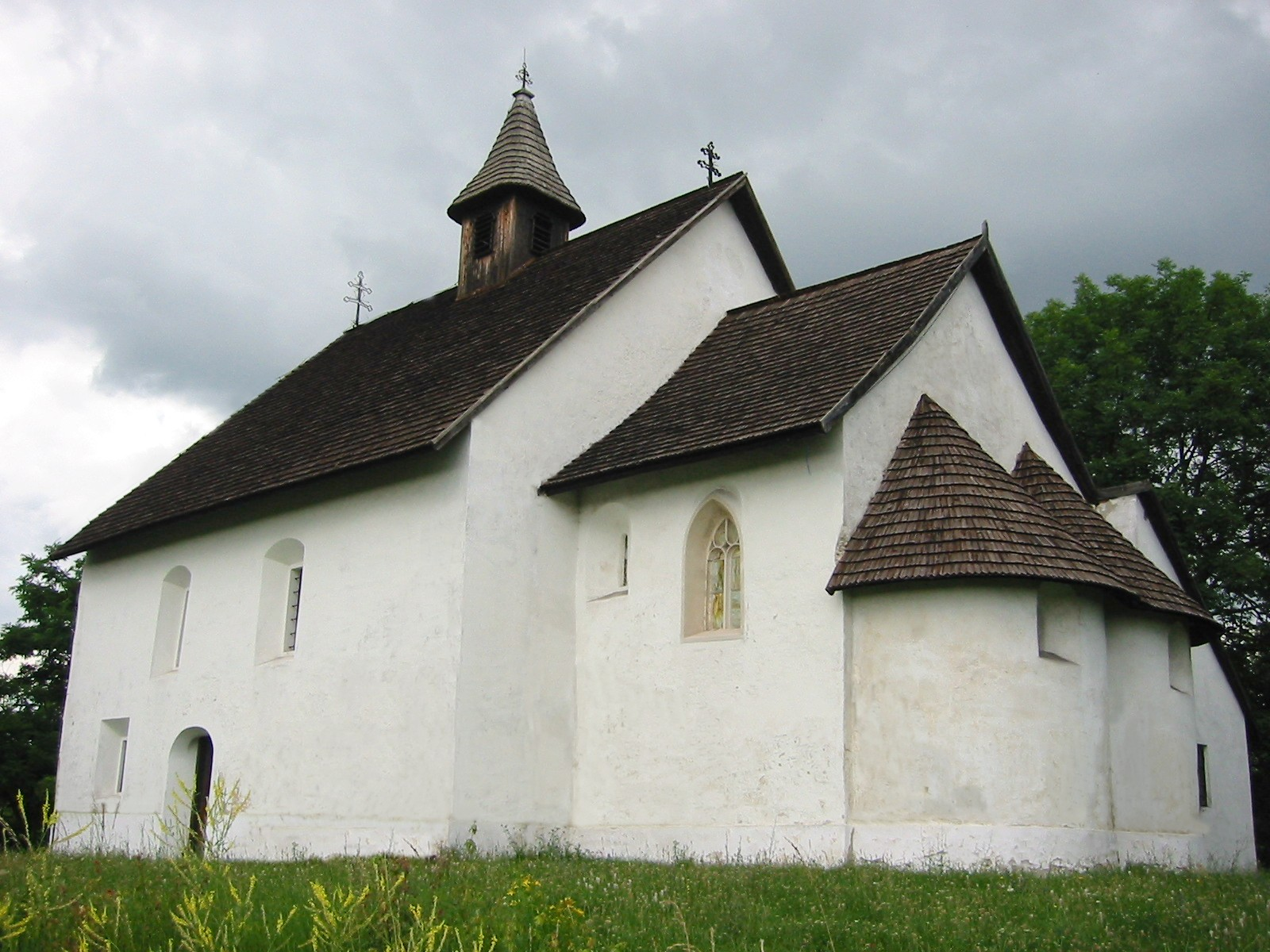
St. Andrew Church in Tornaszentandrás

== See also ==
- List of cities and towns of Hungary
- Edelény Subregion (until 2013)
