= Galyaság =

Region of Borsod-Abaúj-Zemplén, Hungary

Galyaság is a small ethnographical region of Borsod-Abaúj-Zemplén County in Hungary. It is usually described by its central region. In a more tighten manner it includes the Northern and Southern attachemments also.

== Central region ==
Only five settlements belong to this category. Three of them are in the valley of Rét between Aggtelek Karst and the Mountains of Rudabánya. These are Égerszög, Teresztenye and Szőlősardó. The other two are North from these on the hills in the nearby. These villages are Tornakápolna and Varbóc.

== Northern Part ==
- Perkupa (with Dobódél)
- Szögliget and Derenk
- Szin
- Szinpetri
- Jósvafő
- Aggtelek

== Southern Part ==
- Imola
- Kánó
- Alsótelekes
- Felsőtelekes

== Sources ==
- Bogsán Gyula, Koleszár Krisztián: Falvak a Galyaságban és mellékén. Galyasági Településszövetség, Perkupa, 2002. ISBN 963 206 231 0.
