= Zsolt Egyed =

Hungarian politician (1974–2025)

Member of the National Assembly
- In office 14 May 2010 – 7 May 2018

Personal details
- Born: 27 April 1974 Miskolc, Hungary
- Died: 17 October 2025 (aged 51) Ragály, Hungary
- Party: Jobbik
- Profession: Electronic technician, politician

Zsolt Egyed (27 April 1974 – 17 October 2025) was a Hungarian electronic technician and politician, who served as Member of Parliament (MP) from 2010 to 2018. He was a member of the Jobbik.

== Life and career ==
Zsolt Egyed was born in Miskolc on 27 April 1974, into a Lutheran family. He finished his secondary studies in 1992. He qualified as an electronics technician in 1994.

Egyed joined far-right Jobbik in 2007. He was also a founding member of the paramilitary organization Magyar Gárda, serving the captain of its Borsod-Abaúj-Zemplén County branch between 2007 and 2009. He was elected deputy president in 2008, then president of the local county branch of Jobbik in July 2009, also becoming member of the party's national board.

He ran for an individual seat in Miskolc (Borsod-Abaúj-Zemplén County 1st constituency) in the 2010 parliamentary election, but was defeated by Fidesz candidate Katalin Csöbör. Egyed became MP via the Borsod-Abaúj-Zemplén County regional list of the Jobbik. He was a member of the Committee on Employment and Labor and its two sub-committees from 2010 to 2014. Egyed unsuccessfully ran for MP for Ózd (Borsod-Abaúj-Zemplén County 3rd constituency) in the 2014 parliamentary election; he acquired 29.64 of the vote and came to the second place after Fidesz candidate Gábor Riz. Nevertheless, he became MP via the Jobbik's national list. He was a member of the Immunity Committee from 2014 to 2018. Egyed was a candidate of his party in Kazincbarcika (Borsod-Abaúj-Zemplén County 4th constituency) in the 2018 parliamentary election, but acquired 30.17 percent of the vote and was defeated by Zoltán Demeter (Fidesz). Egyed lost his parliamentary seat. Egyed was elected to the local representative body of Kazincbarcika in the 2019 local elections.

Egyed died on 17 October 2025, at the age of 51.
