= István Nyakó =

Hungarian politician (born 1968)

Member of the National Assembly
- In office 15 May 2002 – 5 May 2014
- In office 22 September 1997 – 17 June 1998

Personal details
- Born: 13 May 1968 (age 58) Miskolc, Hungary
- Party: MSZP (since 1989)
- Profession: politician

István Nyakó (born 13 May 1968) is a Hungarian politician, who was a Member of Parliament from 1997 to 1998 and from 2002 to 2014. He is a founding member and long-time press chief and spokesman of the Hungarian Socialist Party (MSZP).

== Early life ==
Nyakó was born in Miskolc on 13 May 1968. He finished his secondary studies at the Izsó Miklós Secondary Grammar School of Edelény in 1986. He worked as a junior clerk in the local council of Edelény, then Miskolc since that year. He was an inspector of the Tax Inspectorate of Borsod-Abaúj-Zemplén County since 1988. He functioned as district notary of Perkupa and Varbóc from 1992 to 1993.

== Political career ==
Nyakó is a founding member of the Hungarian Socialist Party since October 1989. He was the local county leader of the Movement of Young Socialists, one of the two youth organizations of the party, between 1992 and 1993. He was a member of the national presidency of the Left Youth Association since 1994, serving as its vice-president from 1997 to 1998. He is a member of the presidency of the Miskolc branch of the Socialist Party since 1996. He was appointed chair of the party's Borsod-Abaúj-Zemplén County branch in 2009.

As a candidate of his party's county list, he unsuccessfully ran for a parliamentary seat during the 1994 parliamentary election. Nevertheless, he was elected MP via the party's Borsod-Abaúj-Zemplén County county list on 22 September 1997, replacing Pál Tóth, who died on 18 August. He held the office until the 1998 parliamentary election. He was elected to the local government representative body of Miskolc during the 1994 municipal elections. He was re-elected in 1998 and 2002. He became a member of the General Assembly of Borsod-Abaúj-Zemplén County too in 1998.

Becoming senior spokesperson of the party, Nyakó was elected MP again via the Socialist Party's national list during the 2002 parliamentary election. He became a member of the Committee on Human Rights, Minority and Religious Affairs, holding the seat until 2014. He was also a member of the Youth and Sports Committee for a short time between May and November 2002, ans subsequently the Law Enforcement Committee from November 2002 to May 2006. He was re-elected MP from his party's Borsod-Abaúj-Zemplén County list in the 2006 parliamentary election. He served as one of the recorders of the National Assembly from 2006 to 2014.

In February 2016, Nyakó attempted to submit a referendum initiative concerning Hungary's Sunday shopping ban. The Third Orbán Government passed new regulations banned shops from opening on Sundays, which took in effect on 15 March 2015. Nyakó and his fellow lawmaker Zoltán Lukács arrived to the building of the National Election Office (NVI) at early hours, but the entrance was blocked by 15-20 "pumped-up and bald" people. Thereafter Nyakó was held up by the group, who claimed to be "applicants" too, just long enough for a pro-government rival referendum question to be submitted. Some members of the bald men have been identified as security guards of sports club Ferencvárosi TC, which is headed by Gábor Kubatov, the national party director of Fidesz. After the scandal and the following rules of the Constitutional Court, the government dropped the law, and the shopping hours in Hungary are again not regulated since 17 April 2016.
