= Belá Ervin Graf und Freiherr von Bothmer zu Schwegerhoff =

Hungarian military officer

Béla Ervin Graf und Freiherr von Bothmer zu Schwegerhoff (14 October 1857 - 26 December 1940) was a Hungarian military officer. He was born in the village of Szőlősardó, in the Hungarian county of Borsod-Abaúj-Zemplén, as one of the six children of Carl Alexander Friedrich and Rosa von Szabó de Sepsi-Szent-György.

== Army career ==
He served as in the Austro-Hungarian Army as a cadet-Wachtmeister, lieutenant and first lieutenant in the 5th k.u.k. Uhlanen Regiment. He was then transferred to the Royal Hungarian Honvéd-Kavallerie, earning the rank of Rittmeister on 1 November 1889, then to Major on 1 November 1897, and on 1 May 1901 he was made a Lt.-Colonel. In 1903 he was appointed as commander of the 8th Honvéd-Hussars Regiment and then later was transferred in 1907 as a regiment commander of the 10th Honvéd-Hussars Regiment. His younger brother, Arpád Albert Rudolf, became the Field Marshal of the Royal Hungarian Army.

== Marriages ==
Béla Ervin married Mariska Jankovich de Jeszenicze in Rácz-Almás on 20 June 1885 and married his second wife, Martha Szontagh de Igló, in Budapest on 20 September 1898. Both marriages were childless.

== Death ==
He died in Halmi on 26 December 1940, aged 83.
