= Arpád Albert Graf und Freiherr von Bothmer zu Schwegerhoff =

Arpád Albert Graf und Freiherr von Bothmer zu Schwegerhoff (17 September 1858 – 3 July 1938)

== Biography ==
Schwegerhoff was born in Szőlősardó to Carl Alexander Friedrich Graf und Freiherr von Bothmer zu Schwegerhoff and Rosa von Szabó de Sepsi-Szent-György. His father was born in Eickhoff, the family estate. He was one of six children. He married Helene Marie Isidora von Pilaszanovits in Budapest, Hungary on 15 March 1890. They had four children.

== Military career ==
Schwegerhoff was k.u.k. Major General, Knight of the Order of the Iron Crown III Class, owner of military merit and the war medal etc. He was appointed a lieutenant in 1879 to k.k. Infantry Regiment No. 67 and took part in 1882 to defeat the uprising in Herzegovina as Kompagnieoffizer (company officer). In 1889, as a lieutenant on the Royal-Honvéd infanterie (Royal Hungarian Military), he translated and then acted from 1908 to 1911 as a colonel and commander of the Hungarian Royal Gyulaer 2nd - Honvéd Infantry Regiment. For his merits as a military commander he was awarded The Order of the Iron Crown III Class in 1910. From November 1911, Major General Schwegerhoff was the Commander of the Royal Hungarian 75th Honvéd Infantry Brigade in Kolozsvár.

He died in Duna-Almás on 3 July 1938.

== See also ==
- Military of Hungary
