= Rakov (Přerov District) =

- Municipality
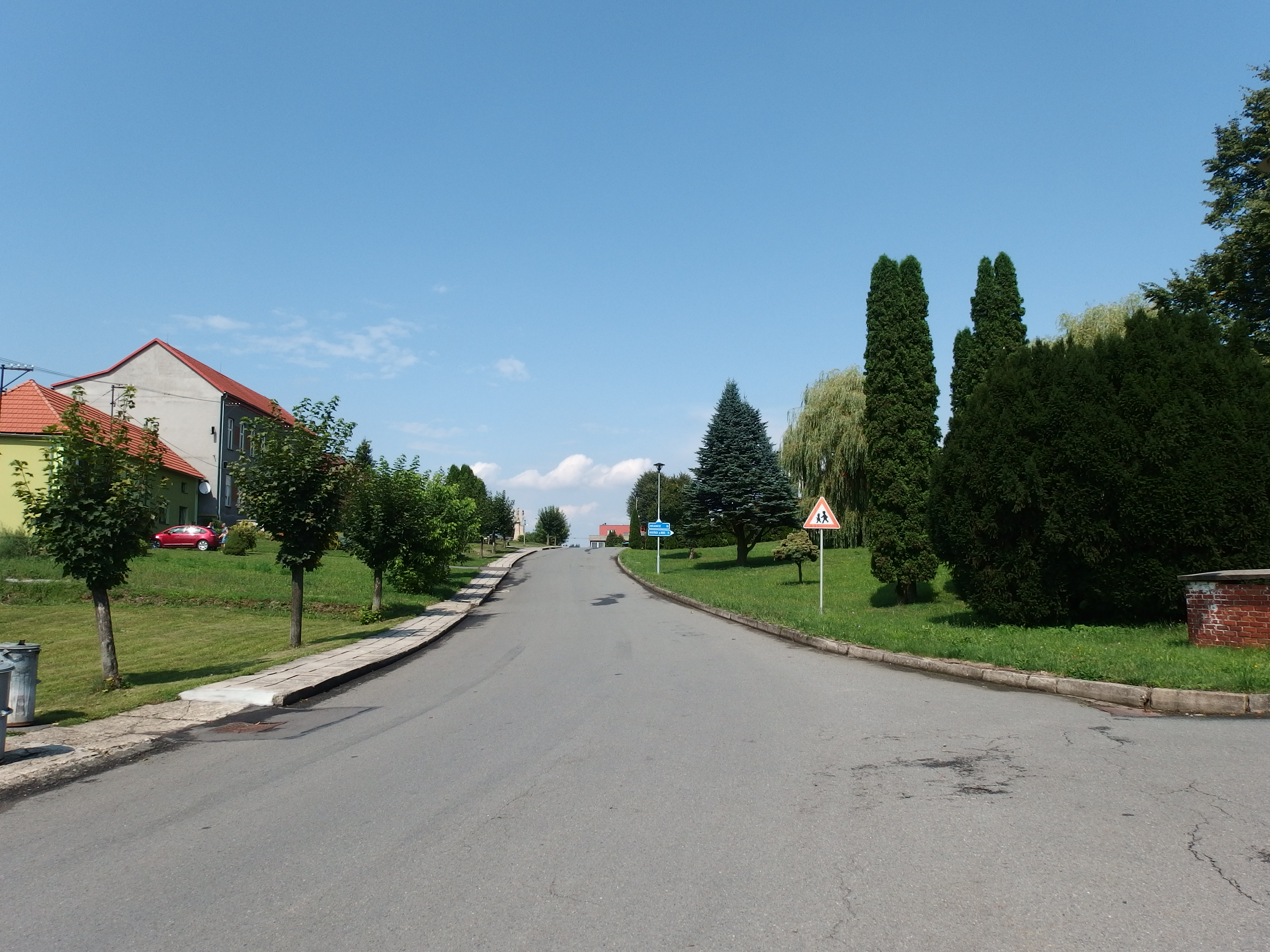
- Centre of Rakov

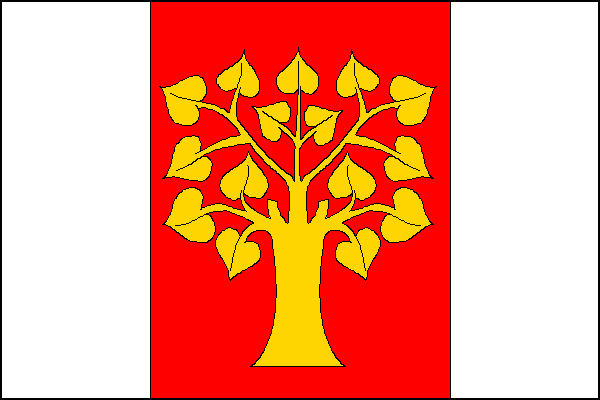
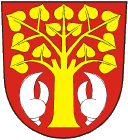
- Flag Coat of arms

- Location in the Czech Republic
- Coordinates: 49°29′30″N 17°42′28″E
- Country: Czech Republic
- Region: Olomouc
- District: Přerov
- First mentioned: 1371

Area
  - Total: 4.98 km^{2} (1.92 sq mi)
- Elevation: 325 m (1,066 ft)

Population (2026-01-01)
  - Total: 412
  - Density: 82.7/km^{2} (214/sq mi)
- Time zone: UTC+1 (CET)
  - Summer (DST): UTC+2 (CEST)
- Postal code: 753 54
- Website: www.rakov.cz

Rakov is a municipality and village in Přerov District in the Olomouc Region of the Czech Republic. It has about 400 inhabitants.

Rakov lies approximately 19 kilometres (12 mi) east of Přerov, 36 km (22 mi) east of Olomouc, and 246 km (153 mi) east of Prague.

== Demographics ==
Historical population
| Year | Pop. | ±% |
|---|---|---|
| 1869 | 373 | — |
| 1880 | 414 | +11.0% |
| 1890 | 401 | −3.1% |
| 1900 | 409 | +2.0% |
| 1910 | 478 | +16.9% |
| 1921 | 452 | −5.4% |
| 1930 | 471 | +4.2% |
| 1950 | 417 | −11.5% |
| 1961 | 410 | −1.7% |
| 1970 | 364 | −11.2% |
| 1980 | 346 | −4.9% |
| 1991 | 347 | +0.3% |
| 2001 | 365 | +5.2% |
| 2011 | 382 | +4.7% |
| 2021 | 381 | −0.3% |
Source: Censuses
