= Gábor Csuzda =

Hungarian politician (born 1989)

Member of the National Assembly
- Incumbent
- Assumed office 10 June 2025
- Preceded by: Csaba Hende

Personal details
- Born: 1989 (age 36–37)
- Party: Fidesz

Gábor Csuzda (born 1989) is a Hungarian politician serving as a member of the National Assembly since 2025. From 2019 to 2024, he was a member of the Borsod-Abaúj-Zemplén County Assembly. From 2019 to 2025, he was a municipal councillor of Ózd.
