= Bódvaszilas =

- Village
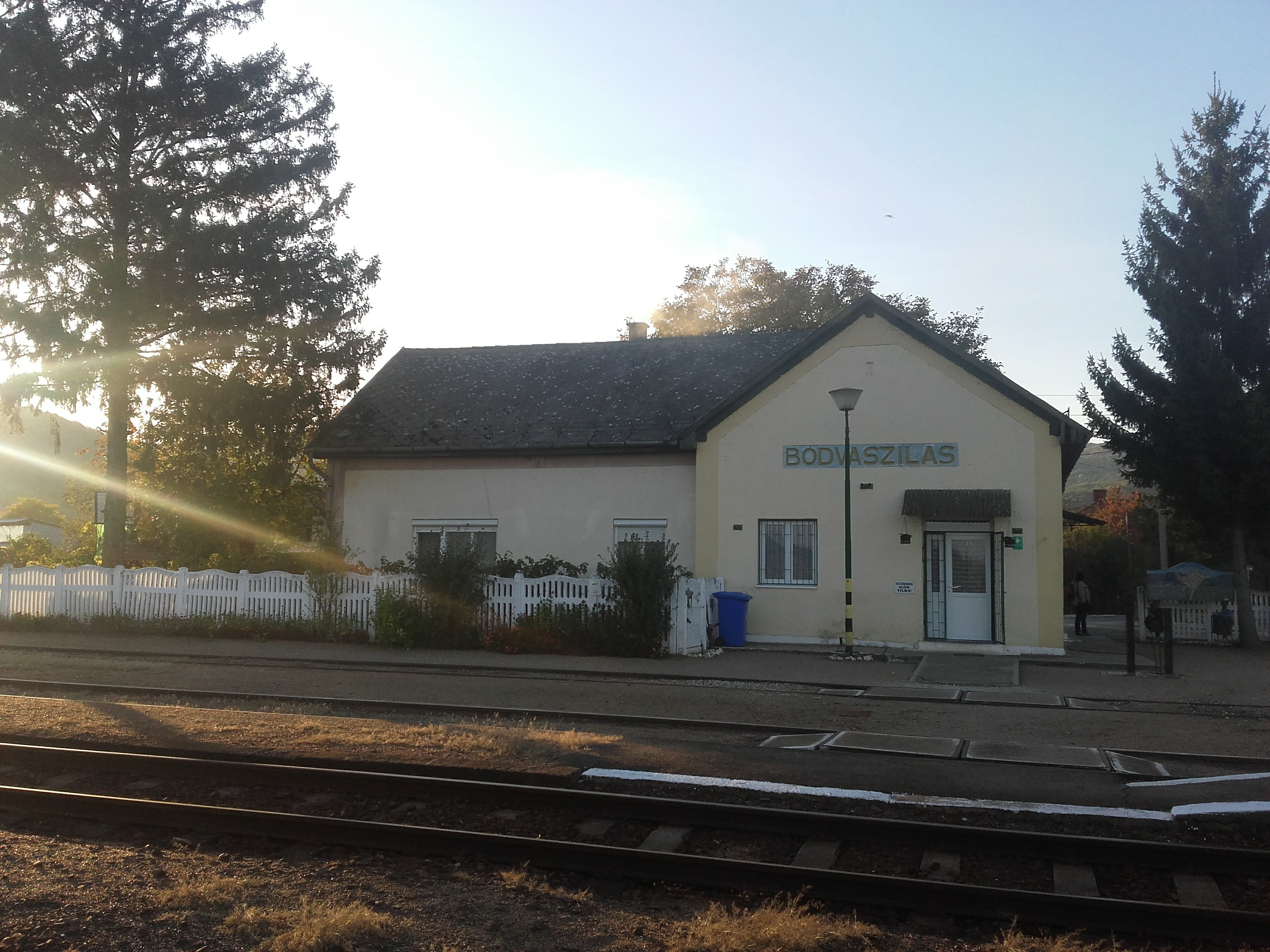
- Bódvaszilas train station

- Flag Coat of arms

- Location of Bódvaszilas
- Coordinates: 48.53685°N 20.73006°E
- Country: Hungary
- Region: Northern Hungary
- County: Borsod-Abaúj-Zemplén
- District: Edelény

Area
  - Total: 19.22 km^{2} (7.42 sq mi)

Population (1 January 2025)
  - Total: 887
  - Density: 46.1/km^{2} (120/sq mi)
- Time zone: UTC+1 (CET)
  - Summer (DST): UTC+2 (CEST)
- Postal code: 3763
- Area code: (+36) 48
- Website: www.bodvaszilas.hu

Bódvaszilas is a village in Borsod-Abaúj-Zemplén county, Hungary.
