= Bódvarákó =

- Coat of arms

- Location of Borsod-Abaúj-Zemplén county in Hungary subdivision_type1=County

- Location of Bódvarákó
- Coordinates: 48.50989°N 20.73592°E
- Country: Hungary

Area
  - Total: 9.22 km^{2} (3.56 sq mi)

Population (2004)
  - Total: 146
  - Density: 15.83/km^{2} (41.0/sq mi)
- Time zone: UTC+1 (CET)
  - Summer (DST): UTC+2 (CEST)
- Postal code: 3764
- Area code: 48

Bódvarákó is a village in Borsod-Abaúj-Zemplén county, Hungary. The village is a UNESCO World Heritage Site.

== Names and etymology ==
The name is of Slavic origin, see also Rakov Potok (Croatia) or Rakov (Czech Republic). Proto-Slavic *rakъ - crayfish. 1284/1464: Rako. The stem Bódva refers to the Bodva river basin.
