= Hidvégardó =

- Village
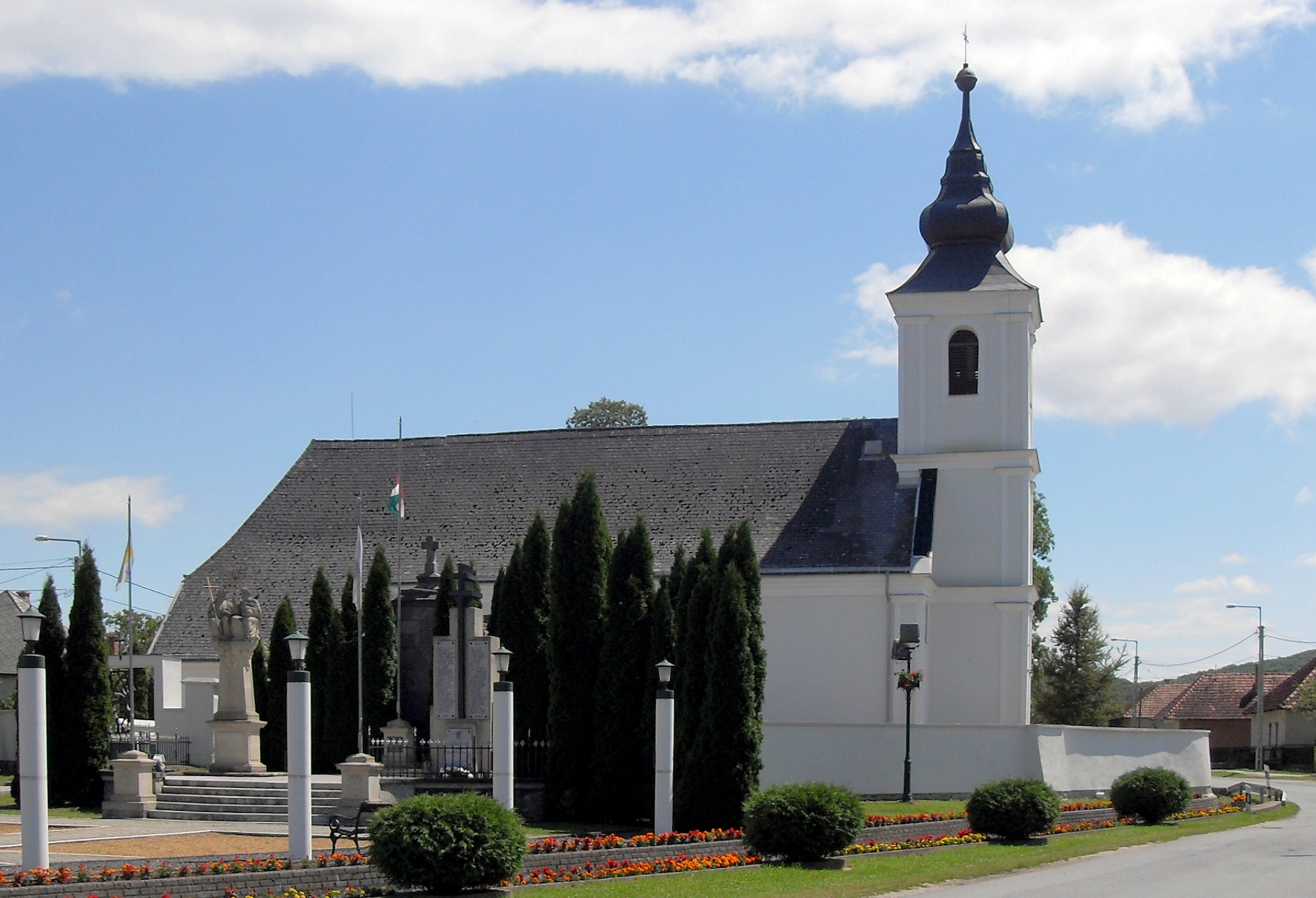

- Flag Coat of arms

- Location of Hidvégardó
- Coordinates: 48.56064°N 20.83825°E
- Country: Hungary
- Region: Northern Hungary
- County: Borsod-Abaúj-Zemplén
- District: Edelény

Area
  - Total: 16.99 km^{2} (6.56 sq mi)

Population (1 January 2025)
  - Total: 496
  - Density: 29.2/km^{2} (75.6/sq mi)
- Time zone: UTC+1 (CET)
  - Summer (DST): UTC+2 (CEST)
- Postal code: 3768
- Area code: (+36) 48
- Website: hidvegardo.hu

Hidvégardó is a village in Borsod-Abaúj-Zemplén County in northeastern Hungary. It is the northernmost settlement in Hungary.
