= Alsótelekes =

- Coat of arms

- Location of Borsod-Abaúj-Zemplén county in Hungary

- Location of Alsótelekes
- Coordinates: 48.41106°N 20.65509°E
- Country: Hungary
- County: Borsod-Abaúj-Zemplén

Area
  - Total: 6.44 km^{2} (2.49 sq mi)

Population (2004)
  - Total: 143
  - Density: 22.2/km^{2} (57/sq mi)
- Time zone: UTC+1 (CET)
  - Summer (DST): UTC+2 (CEST)
- Postal code: 3735
- Area code: 48

Alsótelekes is a village in Borsod-Abaúj-Zemplén county, Hungary.
