= Felsőtelekes =

- Village
- Seal

- Location within Hungary
- Coordinates: 48°24′23.76″N 20°38′13.13″E
- Country: Hungary
- Regions: Northern Hungary
- County: Borsod-Abaúj-Zemplén County

Area
  - Total: 8.45 km^{2} (3.26 sq mi)

Population (2008)
  - Total: 773
- Time zone: UTC+1 (CET)
  - Summer (DST): UTC+2 (CEST)

Felsőtelekes is a village in Borsod-Abaúj-Zemplén County in northeastern Hungary. As of 2008, the village had a population of 773.
