= Kánó =

Coordinates: 48°26′N 20°36′E

- Village
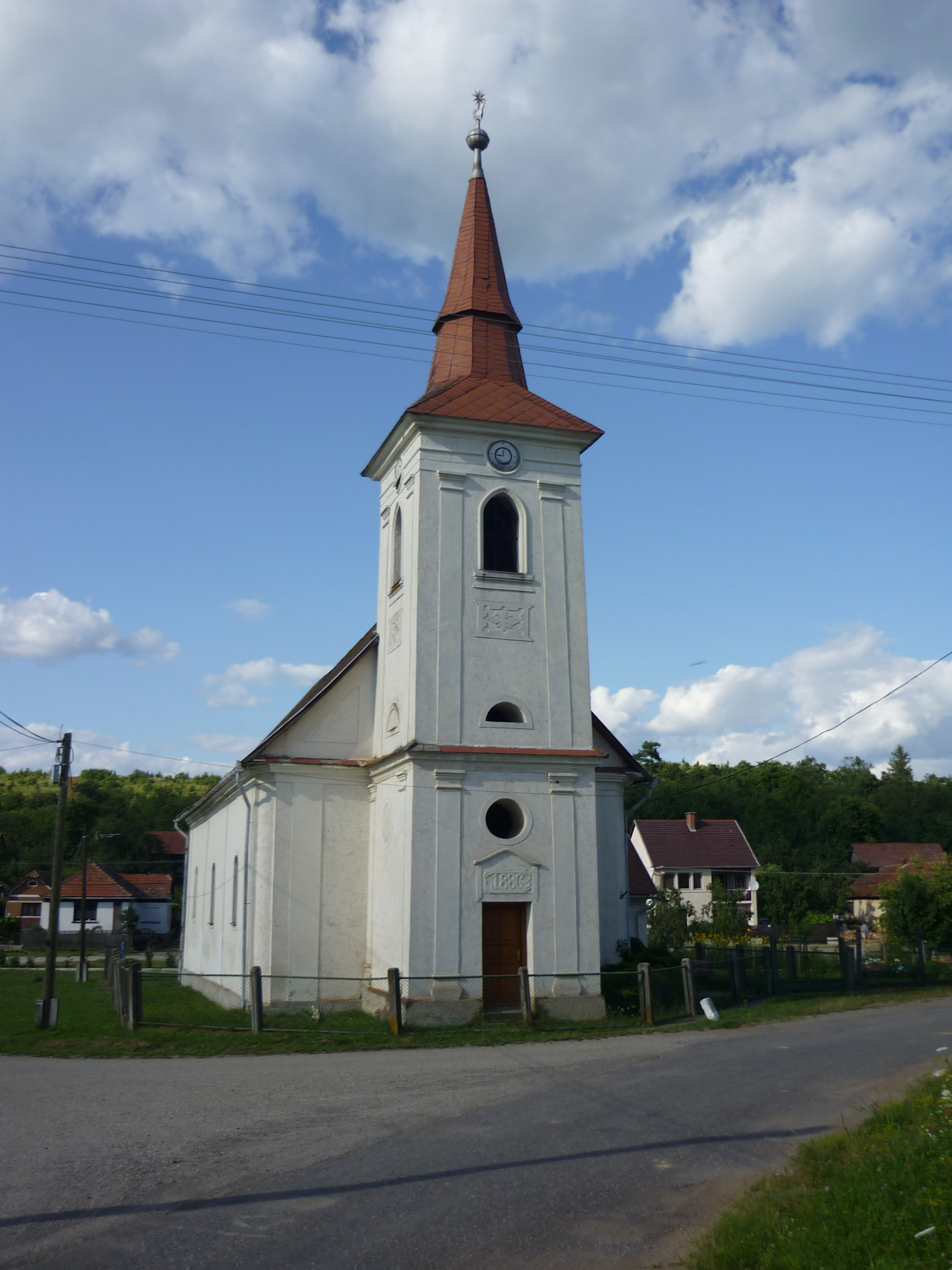
- Kánói református templom
- Interactive map of Kánó
- Country: Hungary
- Regions: Northern Hungary
- County: Borsod-Abaúj-Zemplén County
- Time zone: UTC+1 (CET)
  - Summer (DST): UTC+2 (CEST)

Kánó is a village in Borsod-Abaúj-Zemplén County in northeastern Hungary. Before the Holocaust, few Jewish families lived in the village.
