= Gábor Riz =

Hungarian educator and politician

Member of the National Assembly
- In office 14 May 2010 – 8 May 2026

Personal details
- Born: 5 March 1956 (age 70) Ózd, Hungary
- Party: Fidesz
- Profession: educator, politician

Gábor Riz (born 5 March 1956) is a Hungarian educator and politician, member of the National Assembly (MP) for Ózd (Borsod-Abaúj-Zemplén County Constituency V then III) from 2010 to 2026.

Riz was a member of the local representative body of Ózd from 2006 to 2010. Beside that, he was also a member of the Borsod-Abaúj-Zemplén County Assembly between 2006 and 2014, serving its vice-president from 2010. After his election as MP, Riz was a member of the Economic and Information Technology Committee from 14 May 2010 to 8 May 2026 and Committee on Education, Science and Research from 30 September 2013 to 5 May 2014. He was appointed a member of the Committee on European Affairs in October 2018, holding this position until May 2026. He did not run in the 2026 Hungarian parliamentary election.
