= Szuhogy =

- Location of Borsod-Abaúj-Zemplén county in Hungary

- Location of Szuhogy
- Coordinates: 48.38403°N 20.67513°E
- Country: Hungary
- County: Borsod-Abaúj-Zemplén

Area
  - Total: 17 km^{2} (6.6 sq mi)

Population (2004)
  - Total: 1,267
  - Density: 74.52/km^{2} (193.0/sq mi)
- Time zone: UTC+1 (CET)
  - Summer (DST): UTC+2 (CEST)
- Postal code: 3734
- Area code: 48

Szuhogy is a village in Borsod-Abaúj-Zemplén county, Hungary.
