= Tornanádaska =

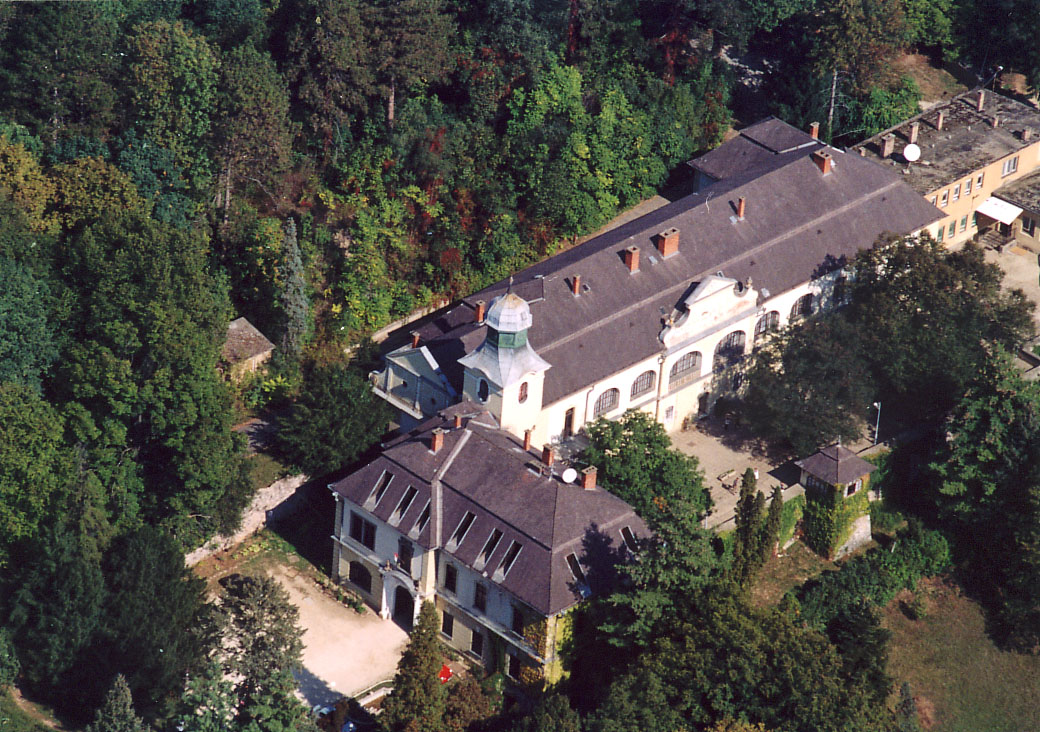

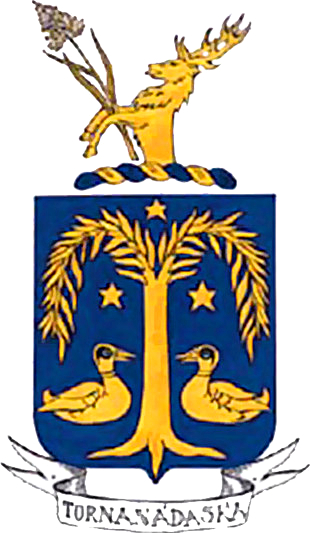
- Coat of arms

- Location of Tornanádaska in Hungary
- Coordinates: 48.55820°N 20.78791°E
- Country: Hungary
- Region: Northern Hungary
- County: Borsod-Abaúj-Zemplén
- Subregion: Edelényi
- Rank: Village

Area
  - Total: 7.82 km^{2} (3.02 sq mi)

Population (1 January 2008)
  - Total: 616
  - Density: 78.8/km^{2} (204/sq mi)
- Time zone: UTC+1 (CET)
  - Summer (DST): UTC+2 (CEST)
- Postal code: 3767
- Area code: +36 48
- KSH code: 18801
- Website: tornanadaska.hu

Tornanádaska (formerly simply Nádaska; Torna-Nád·as-ka means 'reedy place in Torna County') is a village in the Edelényi kistérség, Borsod-Abaúj-Zemplén County, Hungary.

== Etymology ==
The name of the village comes from the former Torna County and the Hungarian nádas ('reedy'). In the Middle Ages, the name of the village was Nádasd.

== History ==
The village was inhabited first by Slavic people in the early 13th century and first documented in 1280. Originally called Nádasd, the name was later changed to Nádaska to distinguish it from other settlements with the same name. The name was given the Torna- prefix in 1905 to represent the county Abaúj-Torna. The population fled in 1570 from the Ottoman conquests, but was repopulated in the 17th century. The village has a Roman Catholic church in Baroque style, which was most likely built on the ruins of the previous church in 1776. The only remaining part of the Reformed church is its bell tower.

== Sights ==
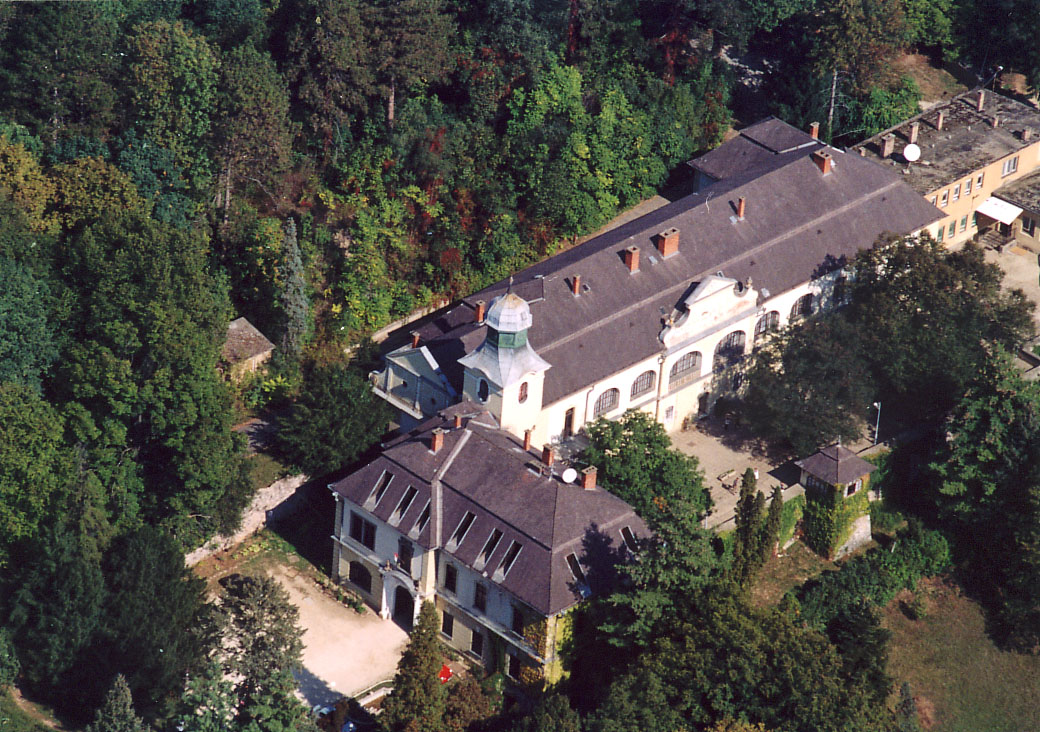
Hadik Castle

- Hadik Castle (Hungarian: Hadik-kastély) – castle of the Hadik family: Baroque-style castle from the Middle Ages, renovated several times, a foster home nowadays.
- Kecskevár – the former castle of Tornanádaska, it lies on the Hungarian-Slovak border, and is therefore divided between Tornanádaska and Dvorníky-Včeláre.
- Roman Catholic Church (Római katolikus templom) – built between 1776 and 1779, in Baroque style.
- Református haranglábtorony – the bell tower of the defunct Reformed church.
- Statue of Saint Stephen of Hungary
