= Becskeháza =

- Location of Borsod-Abaúj-Zemplén county in Hungary

- Location of Becskeháza
- Coordinates: 48.52953°N 20.83566°E
- Country: Hungary
- County: Borsod-Abaúj-Zemplén

Area
  - Total: 5 km^{2} (1.9 sq mi)

Population (2004)
  - Total: 45
  - Density: 9/km^{2} (23/sq mi)
- Time zone: UTC+1 (CET)
  - Summer (DST): UTC+2 (CEST)
- Postal code: 3768
- Area code: 48

Becskeháza is a village in Borsod-Abaúj-Zemplén county, Hungary.

In 1840, Only nine Jews lived in the village. However, the number grew a little bit to 50–200 by the 19th and 20th centuries.

The village has a Jewish cemetery.
