= Bódvalenke =

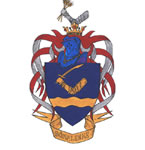
- Seal

- Location of Borsod-Abaúj-Zemplén county in Hungary

- Location of Bódvalenke
- Coordinates: 48.54278°N 20.80497°E
- Country: Hungary
- County: Borsod-Abaúj-Zemplén

Area
  - Total: 6.63 km^{2} (2.56 sq mi)

Population (2004)
  - Total: 187
  - Density: 28.2/km^{2} (73/sq mi)
- Time zone: UTC+1 (CET)
  - Summer (DST): UTC+2 (CEST)
- Postal code: 3768
- Area code: 48

Bódvalenke is a village in Borsod-Abaúj-Zemplén county, Hungary.
