= Aggtelek =

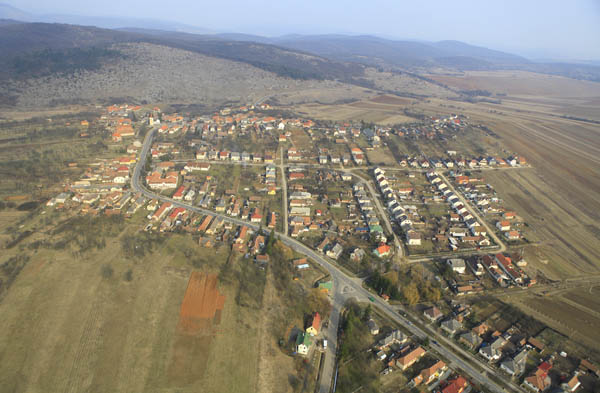
- Aerial view

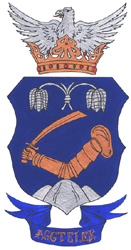
- Coat of arms

- Location of Aggtelek
- Coordinates: 48.46666°N 20.50165°E
- Country: Hungary
- County: Borsod-Abaúj-Zemplén

Area
  - Total: 43.81 km^{2} (16.92 sq mi)

Population (2001)
  - Total: 628
  - Density: 14.33/km^{2} (37.1/sq mi)
- Time zone: UTC+1 (CET)
  - Summer (DST): UTC+2 (CEST)
- Postal code: 3759
- Area code: 48
- Website: https://aggtelek.asp.lgov.hu/

Aggtelek (meaning "Old plot" in Hungarian) is a village in the county of Borsod-Abaúj-Zemplén, Hungary. It is known for the vast stalactite caverns of the nearby Baradla-Domica cave system, part of the UNESCO World Heritage Site of Aggtelek and Slovak Karst.

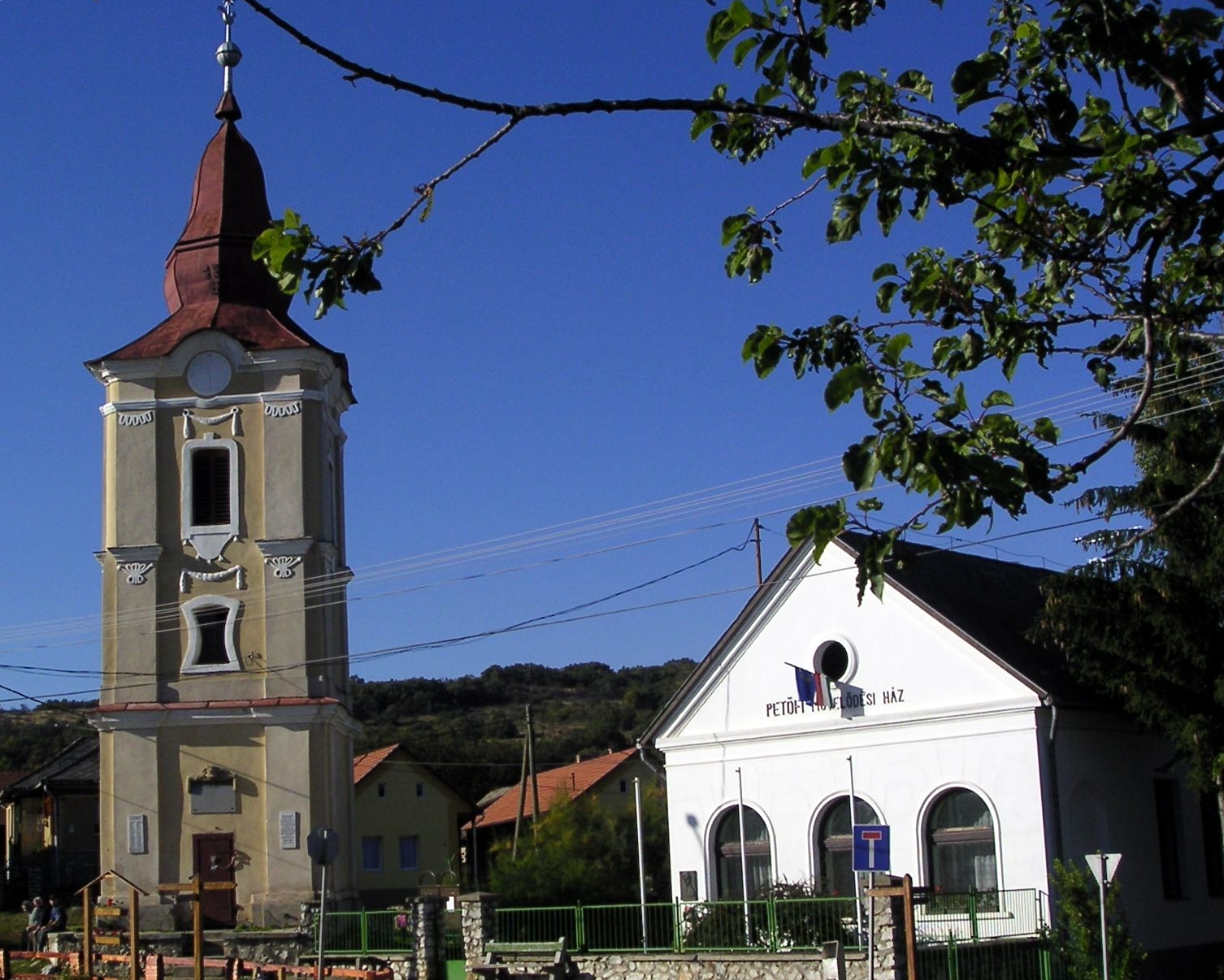
The village of Aggtelek

== Location ==
Aggtelek is located 50 km (31 mi) northwest of the county seat of Miskolc, near the Hungarian–Slovak border.

== History ==
Aggtelek is known to have been first identified in 1295, when it was called Ogogteluk. Following the Mongol invasion of Hungary during the 13th century, it remained deserted for many years.

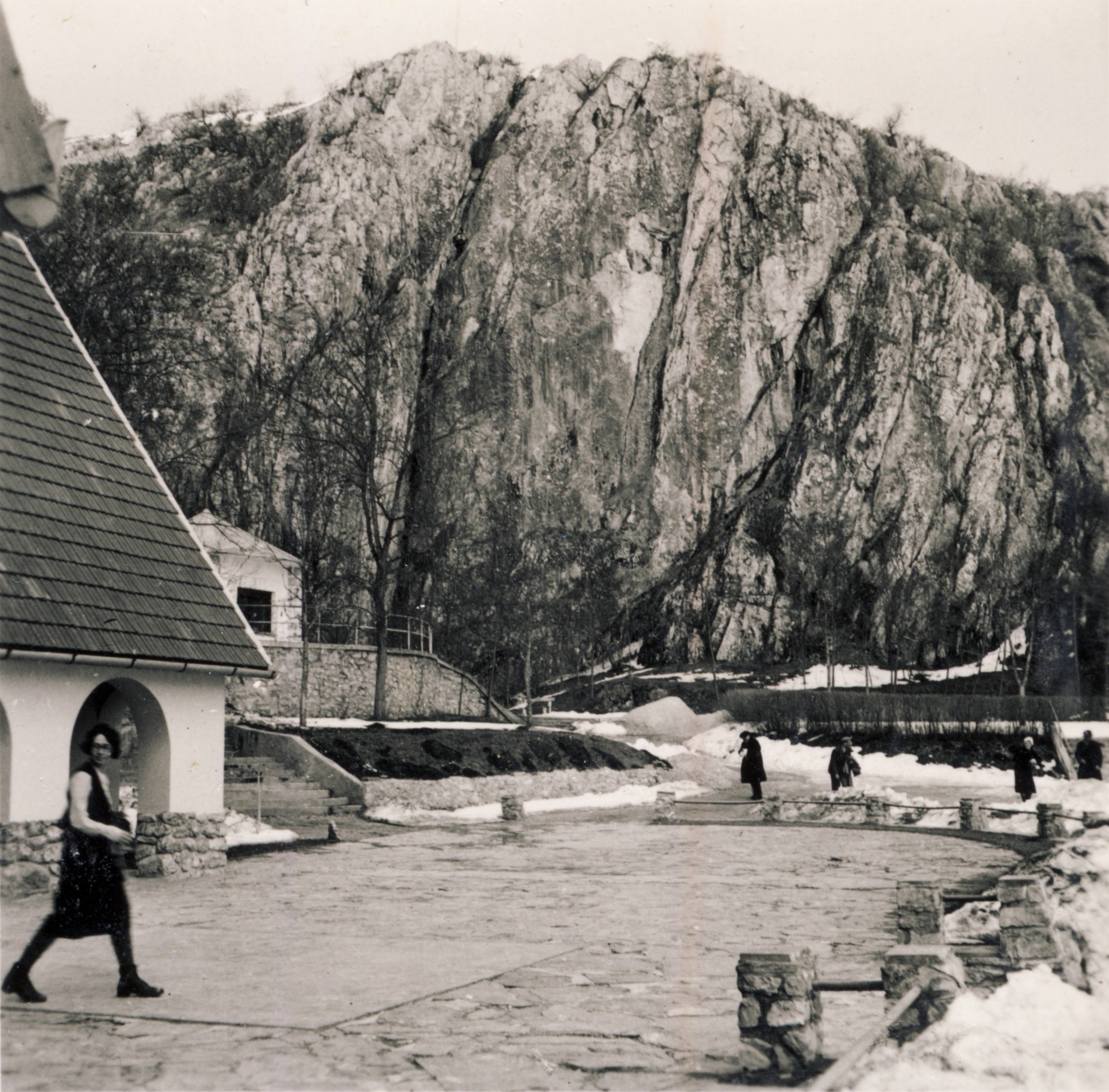
Aggtelek cave entrance

In 1858, a fire destroyed the village. During World War II, the Eastern Front passed close by, causing further damage.

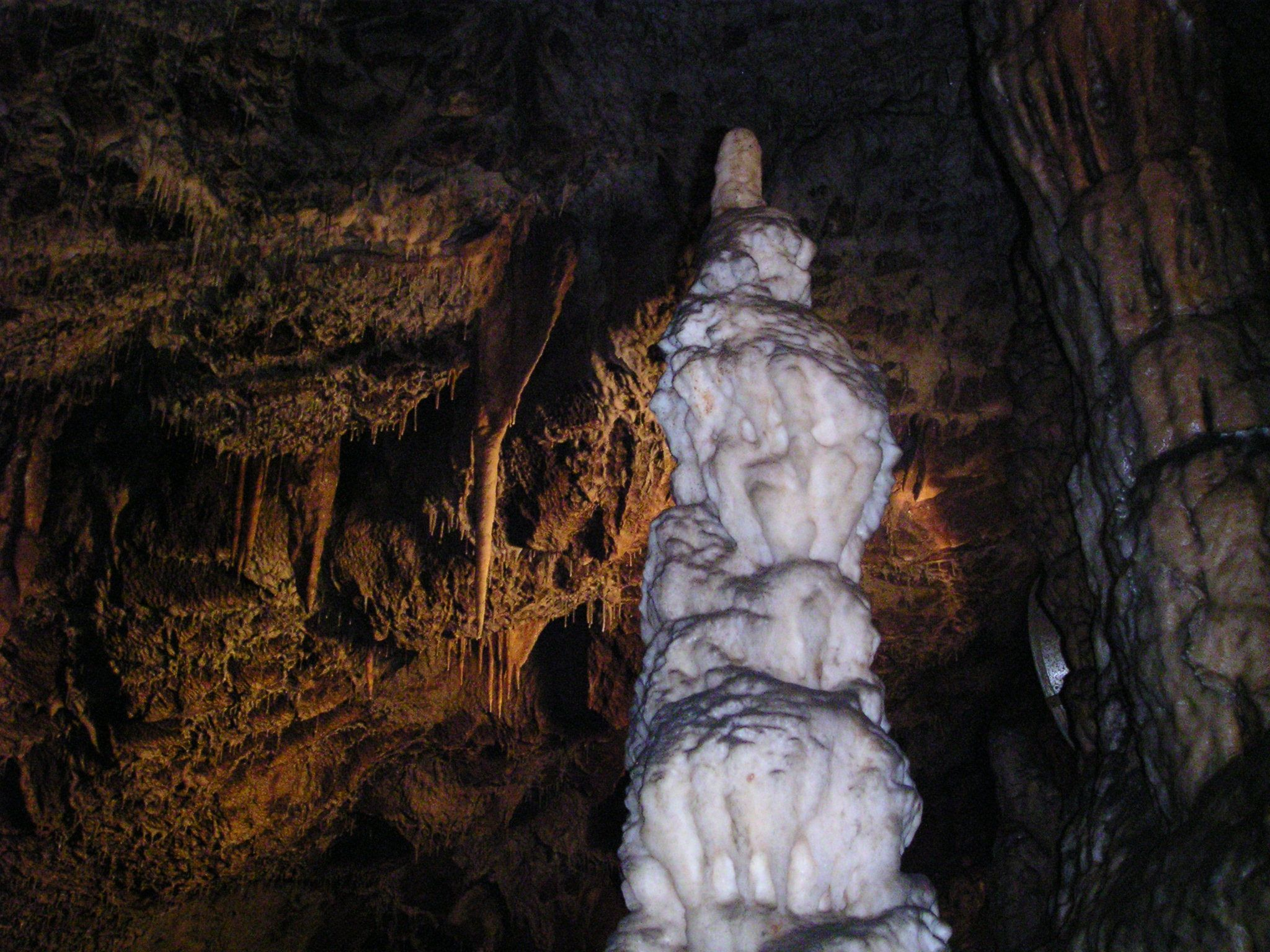
Stalagmite in Baradla cave, Jósvafő.

A few Jews lived in the village and there is a Jewish cemetery where two gravestones and a memorial plaque remain. Jewish residents of the village were murdered in the Holocaust and commemorated in a monument in Ózd.

== Aggtelek National Park ==
The Long Tour of Baradla Cave is a 7-kilometer walking tour along the main section of the stalactite cave; shorter tours are available for unscheduled tourist visits in various parts of the cave system. The entire cave is nearly 24 kilometers long, of which 5.6 kilometers go under Slovakia. The average height of the cave is 8 meters and the average width 10 meters. The cavern called the Giants' Hall is 125 meters long, 55 meters wide and 30 meters high, making the cavern one of the most spectacular tourist attractions in the world - even though it is one of the least known and least visited.

== Picture gallery ==
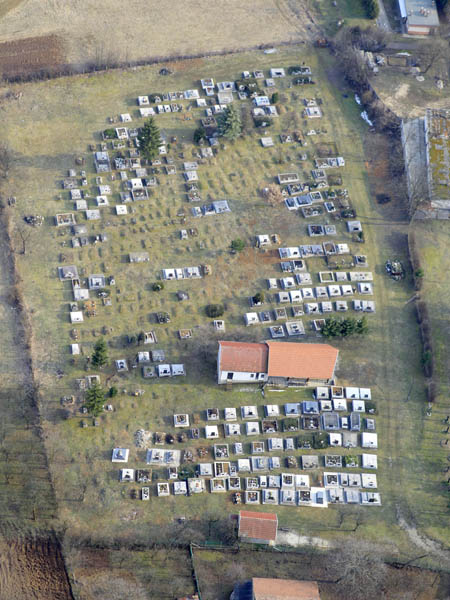

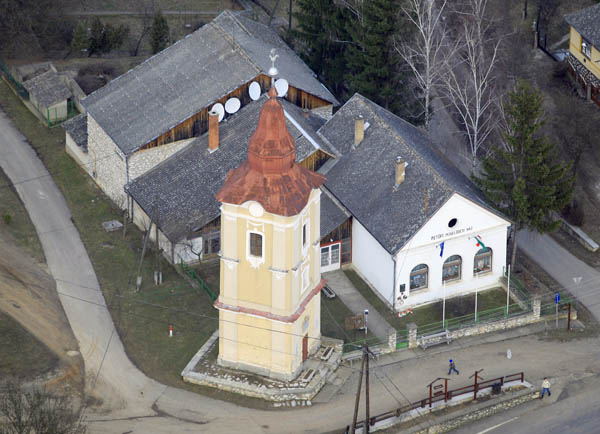

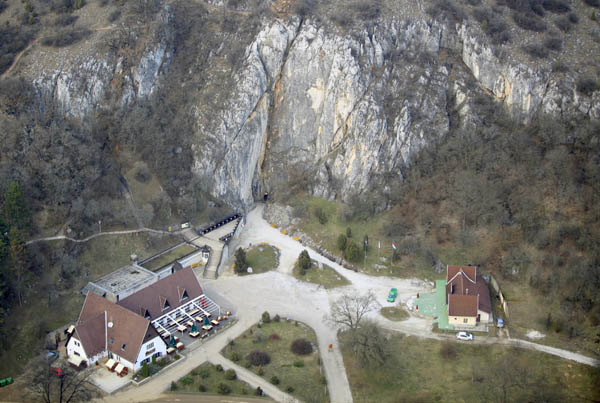

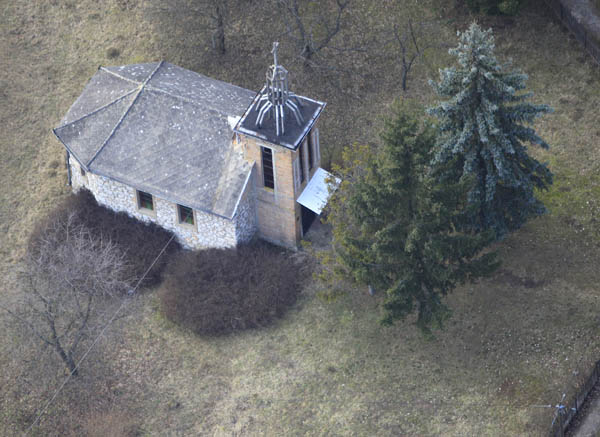
