= Teresztenye =

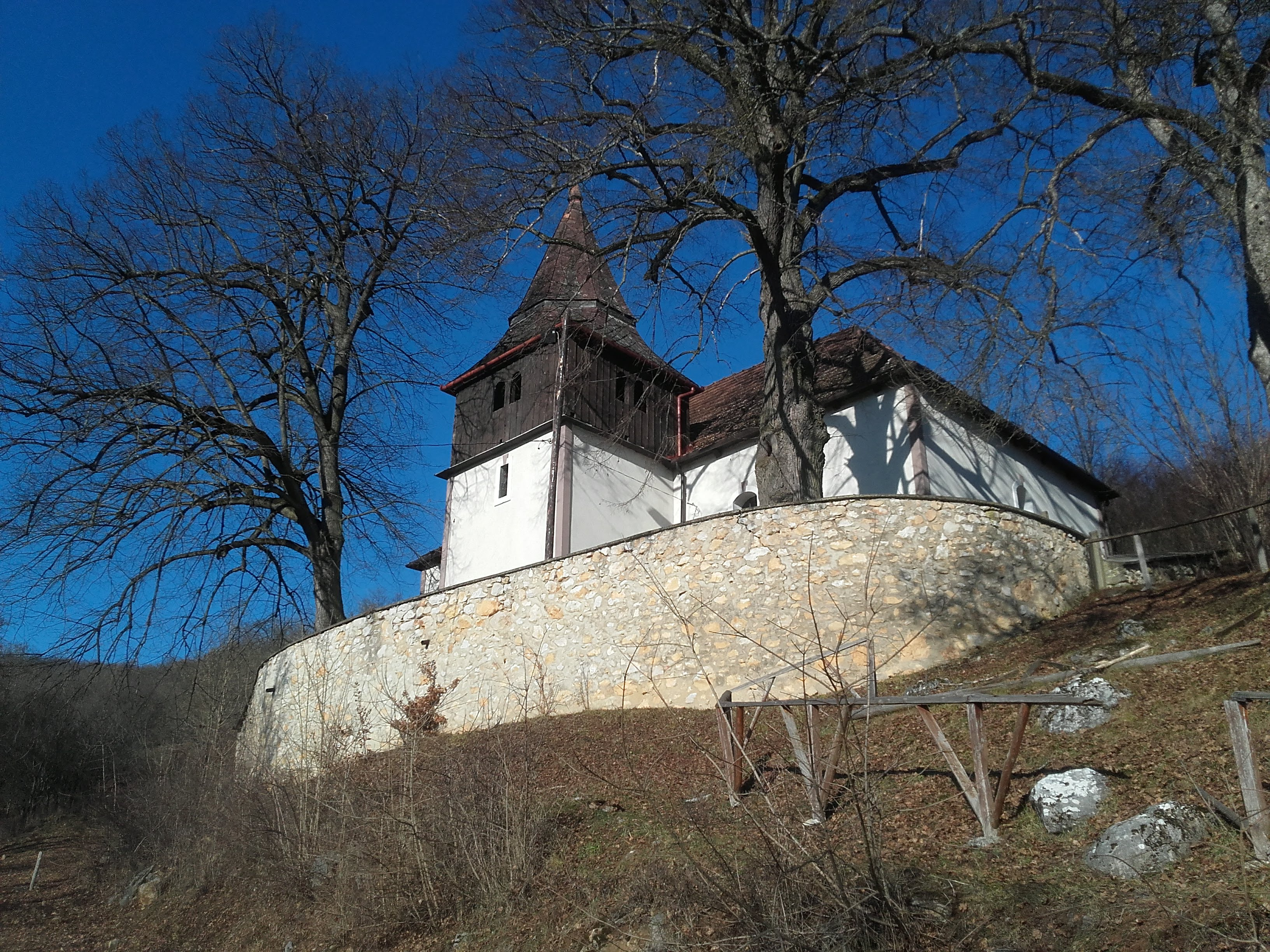
- Church, Teresztenye

- Location of Borsod-Abaúj-Zemplén county in Hungary

- Location of Teresztenye
- Coordinates: 48.44552°N 20.60475°E
- Country: Hungary
- County: Borsod-Abaúj-Zemplén

Area
  - Total: 8.7 km^{2} (3.4 sq mi)

Population (2004)
  - Total: 27
  - Density: 3.1/km^{2} (8.0/sq mi)
- Time zone: UTC+1 (CET)
  - Summer (DST): UTC+2 (CEST)
- Postal code: 3757
- Area code: 48

Teresztenye is a village in Borsod-Abaúj-Zemplén county, in the north-east region of Hungary.

== History ==
The first official documents in 1272 mentioned the village as Trestene (which is Slavic originated since trestené means reed). The village has an iconic church which was built during the Árpád-dynasty and watches over the dwellers from the mountainside.

The population of Teresztenye, according to the memorandums, was 273 in 1870, but since then with each census made after the following years, it was continuously decreasing. In 2000 the population dropped to 30 residents and nowadays (2014) the total population of the village is 27. During the 19th century and the early years of the 20th century, the village had a flourishing agricultural life with hundreds of domestic animals including cattle, horses and pigs. The cultivation of the surrounding fields was achieved by intense, hard work since the area is highly argillaceous.

After World War II, the developing industrial life in Hungary freed many workforce in the area. The domestic life within Teresztenye slowly started to disappear and the area's coal mines were closed since the youth of the village move to the cities: Miskolc and Kazincbarcika. The older population were unable to cultivate the harsh, mountainside's field and even the once famous plumtree orchard became wildly overgrown. Teresztenye like other small villages in Hungary almost became abandoned.

The Aggtelek National Park's area reaches to the edge of the village. Thanks to that, the village remained in its original form with its undisturbed view. The idyllic nature, the peaceful inhabitants and the surrounding area, which is rich in sights to see (Aggtelek, Bükk Mountains, the Krásna Hôrka Castle), helped Teresztenye to become a famous target for rural tourism instead of becoming a forever-lost treasure in Hungary.
