= Tornaszentandrás =

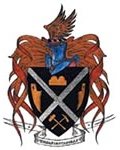
- Coat of arms

- Location of Tornaszentandrás in Hungary
- Coordinates: 48°31′12.86″N 20°46′32.77″E
- Country: Hungary
- Region: Northern Hungary
- County: Borsod-Abaúj-Zemplén
- Subregion: Edelényi
- Rank: Village

Area
  - Total: 15.65 km^{2} (6.04 sq mi)

Population (1 January 2008)
  - Total: 233
  - Density: 14.9/km^{2} (38.6/sq mi)
- Time zone: UTC+1 (CET)
  - Summer (DST): UTC+2 (CEST)
- Postal code: 3765
- Area code: +36 48
- KSH code: 27836
- Website: www.menet.hu/tornaszentandras/

Tornaszentandrás is a village in Borsod-Abaúj-Zemplén County, in Hungary. The name literally means 'Saint Andrew in Torna County'.

== Sightseeing ==
The major sight in the village is the parish church of Saint Andrew dating back to the Árpád dynasty: it has a double apse. In one of apse stands a statue of the patron saint of miners, Saint Barbara. In the other stands a statue of the patron saint of the church, Saint Andrew. The landowners of the village settled miners from Merano, in northern Italy, and their religious tradition is probably reflected in these apses here in Hungary.

Tornaszentandrás is home to extraordinary landscapes, which are especially breathtaking in the early hours.

== Outer links ==
- Tornaszentandrás on a Vendégváró homepage.
- Images of the Tornaszentandrás romanesque church in 3D.
