= Komjáti =

Coordinates: 48°33′N 20°46′E

- Village
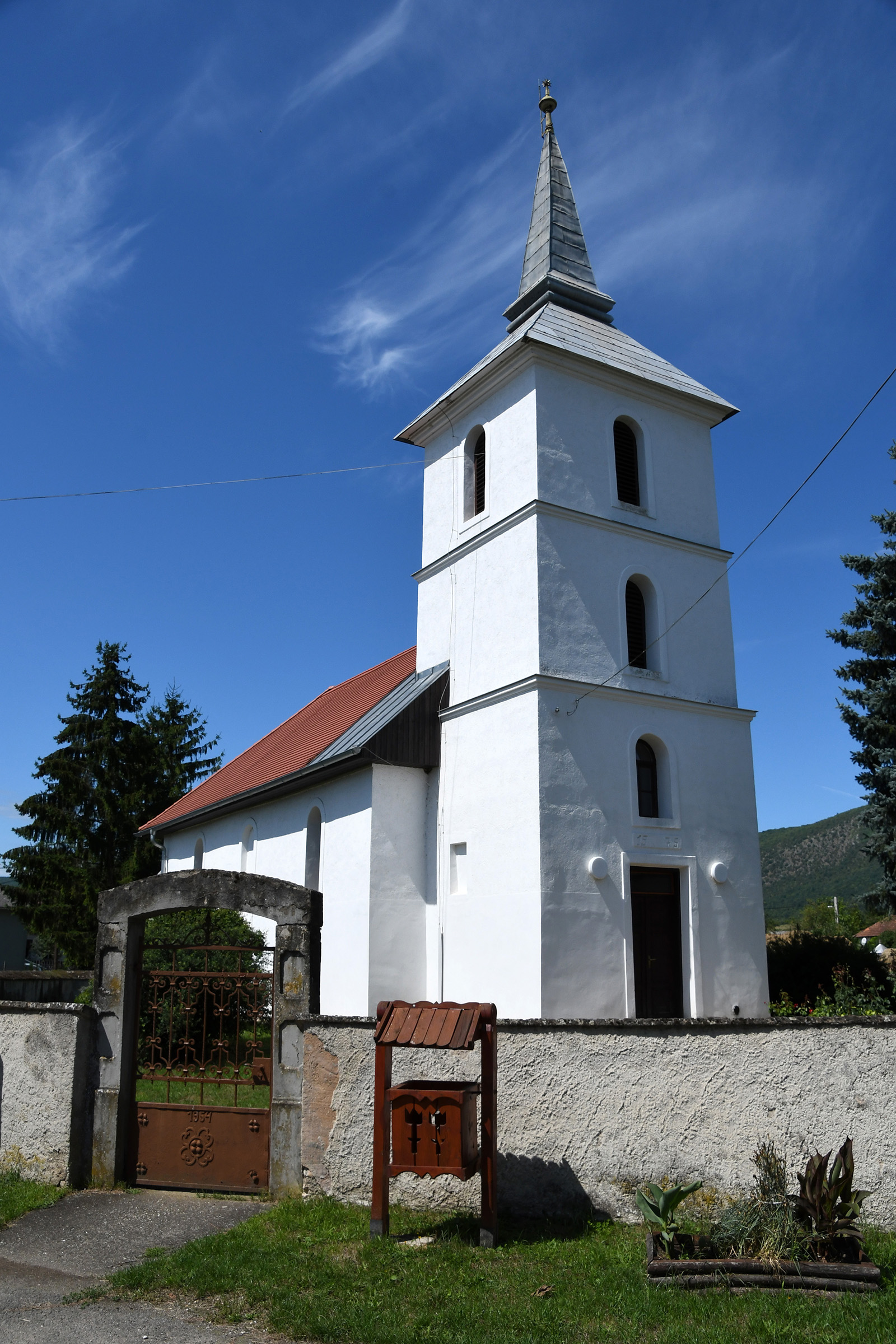
- Calvinist church in Komjáti, Hungary
- Interactive map of Komjáti
- Country: Hungary
- Regions: Northern Hungary
- County: Borsod-Abaúj-Zemplén County
- Time zone: UTC+1 (CET)
  - Summer (DST): UTC+2 (CEST)

Komjáti is a village in Borsod-Abaúj-Zemplén County in northeastern Hungary.
