= Varbóc =

- City
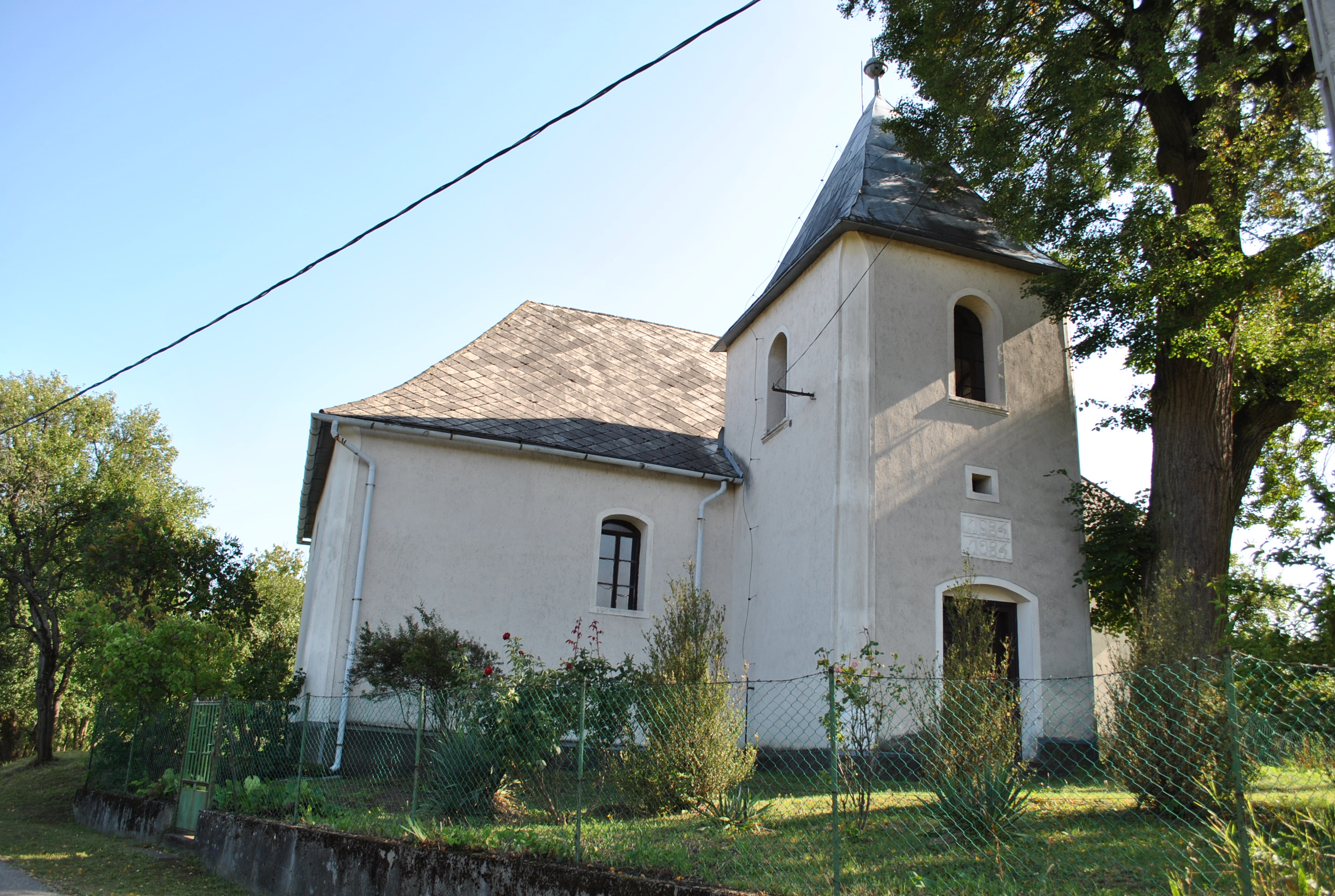
- Reformed Church in Varbóc

- Flag Coat of arms

- Location within Borsod-Abaúj-Zemplén County Location within Hungary
- Coordinates: 48°27′49″N 20°38′45″E
- Country: Hungary
- Regions: Northern Hungary
- County: Borsod-Abaúj-Zemplén County

Government
  - Mayor: László Molnár

Population (2023)
  - Total: 54
- Time zone: UTC+1 (CET)
  - Summer (DST): UTC+2 (CEST)

Varbóc is a village in Borsod-Abaúj-Zemplén County in northeastern Hungary.

== Location ==
It is located 28 kilometers from Kazincbarcika and 13 kilometers from Aggtelek. To the north of the village is the 327-meter-high Hársas Hill, to the northwest is the 411-meter-high Bérctető, to the west is the 337-meter-high Borháztető, to the southwest is the 313-meter-high Bokánytető, and to the south rises the 311-meter-high Szarvas Hill. Its inhabited area outside the village is called Lászitanya.

== Accessibility ==
It is a remote settlement accessible by road only from the 27th main road, specifically at kilometer marker 35+750, branching off at the center of Perkupa on the 26 112 side road. The southern outskirts are also crossed by the 26 109 side road leading from Perkupa to Szőlősardó, where the relatively distant Égervölgye Youth Camp associated with the village can be reached.

== Meaning of the Name ==
As with other villages in the vicinity, one can deduce the meaning of its name from the Old Slavic language, which translates to "willow."

== History ==
A document from the year 1298 mentions a stream named vrbina, flowing from east to west in the valley towards Perkupa, originating from a spring at the base of Borház-tető. It is likely that the settlement got its name from this stream and the willows growing abundantly in the valley. In the 1800s, the village was known for its white wine grapes, and the honey-white wine from here could rival the best and most famous Hungarian wines.

The fate of Varbóc and the surrounding settlements was sealed by the devastating phylloxera epidemic in the 1870s and 1880s.

Around 1684, a wooden church was built at the site of the current stone church. A census from 1720 also mentions it. The church was renovated in 1895, presumably when its original form was altered. Notable features include the painted wooden ceiling and the Baroque pulpit. Near the northern external wall of the church, there is a linden tree that is almost one and a half centuries old. The Roman Catholic inhabitants of the village built their church in honor of the Virgin Mary in 1952.

In 1958–59, surveys related to folk architecture and traditions were conducted in the village. At that time, the buildings at Dózsa Gy. u. 2., 8., 10., 24., 34., 35., and 40., as well as Petőfi S. u. 5., 9., 20., and Táncsics M. u. 13., were considered worthy of preservation.

== Community Life ==
=== Mayors ===
- 1990–1994: Lajos Molnár (independent)
- 1994–1998: Lajos Molnár (Hungarian People's Party – NPP)
- 1998–2002: Lajos Molnár (independent)
- 2002–2006: Lajos Molnár (independent)
- 2006–2010: Lajos Molnár (independent)
- 2010–2014: László Molnár Jr. (independent)
- 2014–2019: László Molnár (independent)
- 2019–present: László Molnár (independent)

== Notable Features ==
- Roman Catholic Church
- Lightning Locator
- In 1995, five caves in the village, including Ördög-gát-lyuk, Telekes-völgyi 4th cave, Telekes-völgyi 5th cave, Telekes-völgyi 8th cave, and Vörös-barlang, were declared part of the UNESCO World Heritage along with other caves in Aggtelek Karst and Slovak Karst.

== Daily Life of Residents ==
Among the village residents, there are several carpenters and hunters, and many are retirees. In their daily lives, most people engage in caring for their gardens and small vegetable plots. Nowadays, many visit the village for vacations.

== Translation ==
Content in this edit is translated from the existing Hungarian Wikipedia article at hu:Varbóc; see its history for attribution.
