= Jósvafő =

- Village
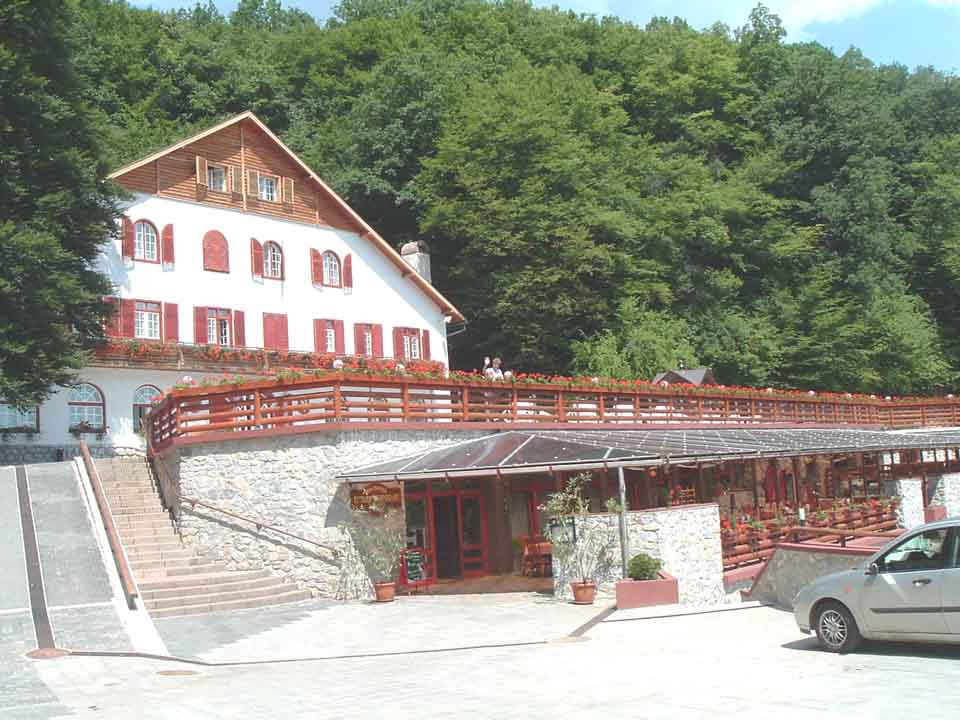

- Flag Coat of arms

- Location of Jósvafő
- Coordinates: 48.48348°N 20.55367°E
- Country: Hungary
- Region: Northern Hungary
- County: Borsod-Abaúj-Zemplén
- District: Putnok

Area
  - Total: 21.53 km^{2} (8.31 sq mi)

Population (1 January 2026)
  - Total: 247
  - Density: 11.5/km^{2} (29.7/sq mi)
- Time zone: UTC+1 (CET)
  - Summer (DST): UTC+2 (CEST)
- Postal code: 3758
- Area code: (+36) 48
- Website: josvafo.hu

Jósvafő is a village in Borsod-Abaúj-Zemplén county, Hungary, situated at the confluence of the Jósva, Kecső, and Tohonya streams. The area, now designated Aggtelek National Park, abounds with natural springs and caves. The "old village" of the settlement was declared a landmark site in 1999. The Tengerszem Lake was constructed in the 1930s to power mills and generate power, from a system in the Baradla Cave.

== History ==
The name of the village first appeared on a certificate of 1272, but there is no detailed record until 1399. This was a basic settlement built around a stone church. The old-town part of the settlement survives today, housed in a former central watermill. Many mills were constructed next to the streams which led to much industry being developed in the village. The Kleins constructed the Upper Mill in the Törőfej Valley in 1840. In 1917, a connecting small power plant was built which provided electricity for the inhabitants. The Tengerszem Lake was created in the 1930s along with a new turbine.

== Climate ==
Jósvafő's climate is classified as humid continental climate (Köppen Dfb). Among them, the annual average temperature is 9.4 °C (48.9 °F), the hottest month in July is 19.9 °C (67.8 °F), and the coldest month is −2.1 °C (28.2 °F) in January. The annual precipitation is 638.9 millimetres (25.15 in), of which July is the wettest with 94.4 millimetres (3.72 in), while January is the driest with only 29.0 millimetres (1.14 in). The extreme temperature throughout the year ranged from −20.4 °C (−4.7 °F) on 3 February 2012 to 36.9 °C (98.4 °F) on 20 July 2007.

Climate data for Jósvafő, 1991−2020 normals
Month	Jan	Feb	Mar	Apr	May	Jun	Jul	Aug	Sep	Oct	Nov	Dec	Year
Record high °C (°F)	15.5 (59.9)	16.9 (62.4)	22.5 (72.5)	28.3 (82.9)	30.6 (87.1)	34.0 (93.2)	36.9 (98.4)	35.7 (96.3)	32.7 (90.9)	26.4 (79.5)	22.6 (72.7)	13.8 (56.8)	36.9 (98.4)
Mean daily maximum °C (°F)	1.2 (34.2)	4.0 (39.2)	9.5 (49.1)	16.0 (60.8)	20.5 (68.9)	24.0 (75.2)	25.8 (78.4)	26.0 (78.8)	20.6 (69.1)	14.3 (57.7)	7.8 (46.0)	1.7 (35.1)	14.3 (57.7)
Daily mean °C (°F)	−2.1 (28.2)	−0.1 (31.8)	4.6 (40.3)	10.4 (50.7)	14.7 (58.5)	18.2 (64.8)	19.9 (67.8)	19.8 (67.6)	14.8 (58.6)	9.4 (48.9)	4.2 (39.6)	−1.1 (30.0)	9.4 (48.9)
Mean daily minimum °C (°F)	−4.8 (23.4)	−3.5 (25.7)	0.1 (32.2)	5.0 (41.0)	9.4 (48.9)	12.8 (55.0)	14.5 (58.1)	14.3 (57.7)	10.1 (50.2)	5.6 (42.1)	1.3 (34.3)	−3.6 (25.5)	5.1 (41.2)
Record low °C (°F)	−17.6 (0.3)	−20.4 (−4.7)	−15.8 (3.6)	−6.0 (21.2)	−2.4 (27.7)	4.6 (40.3)	5.7 (42.3)	5.9 (42.6)	1.2 (34.2)	−7.2 (19.0)	−12.4 (9.7)	−19.3 (−2.7)	−20.4 (−4.7)
Average precipitation mm (inches)	29.0 (1.14)	30.1 (1.19)	32.7 (1.29)	45.2 (1.78)	77.3 (3.04)	83.0 (3.27)	94.4 (3.72)	65.6 (2.58)	50.7 (2.00)	51.6 (2.03)	45.0 (1.77)	34.3 (1.35)	638.9 (25.15)
Average precipitation days (≥ 1.0 mm)	5.8	6.2	5.7	7.3	10.6	9.8	10.6	7.2	6.7	6.7	7.2	6.9	90.7
Average relative humidity (%)	84.1	77.1	65.4	61.3	68.7	70.6	69.7	68.6	74.5	79.6	83.9	86.8	74.2
Source: NOAA

== Gallery ==
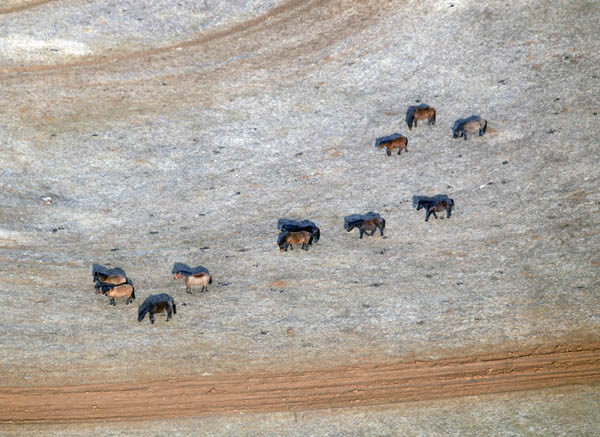

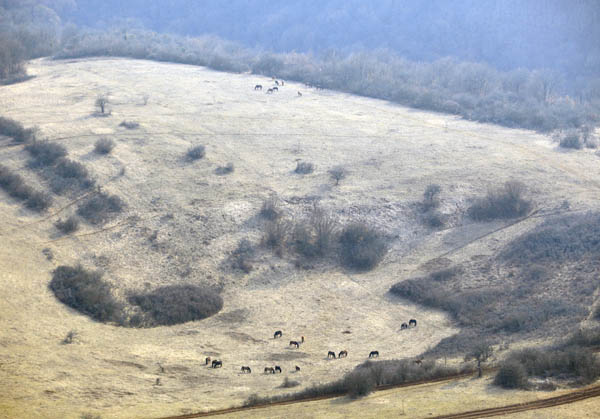

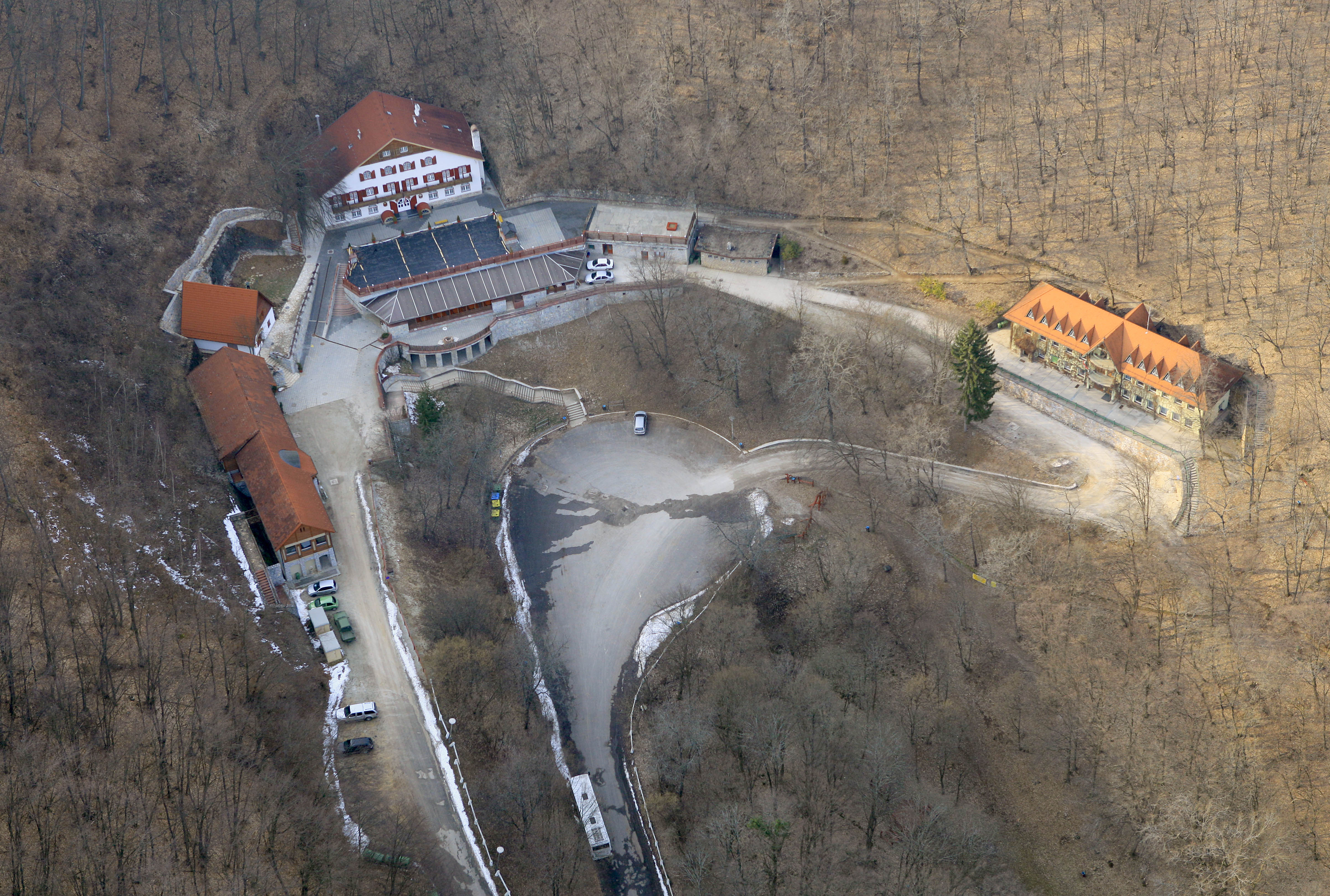

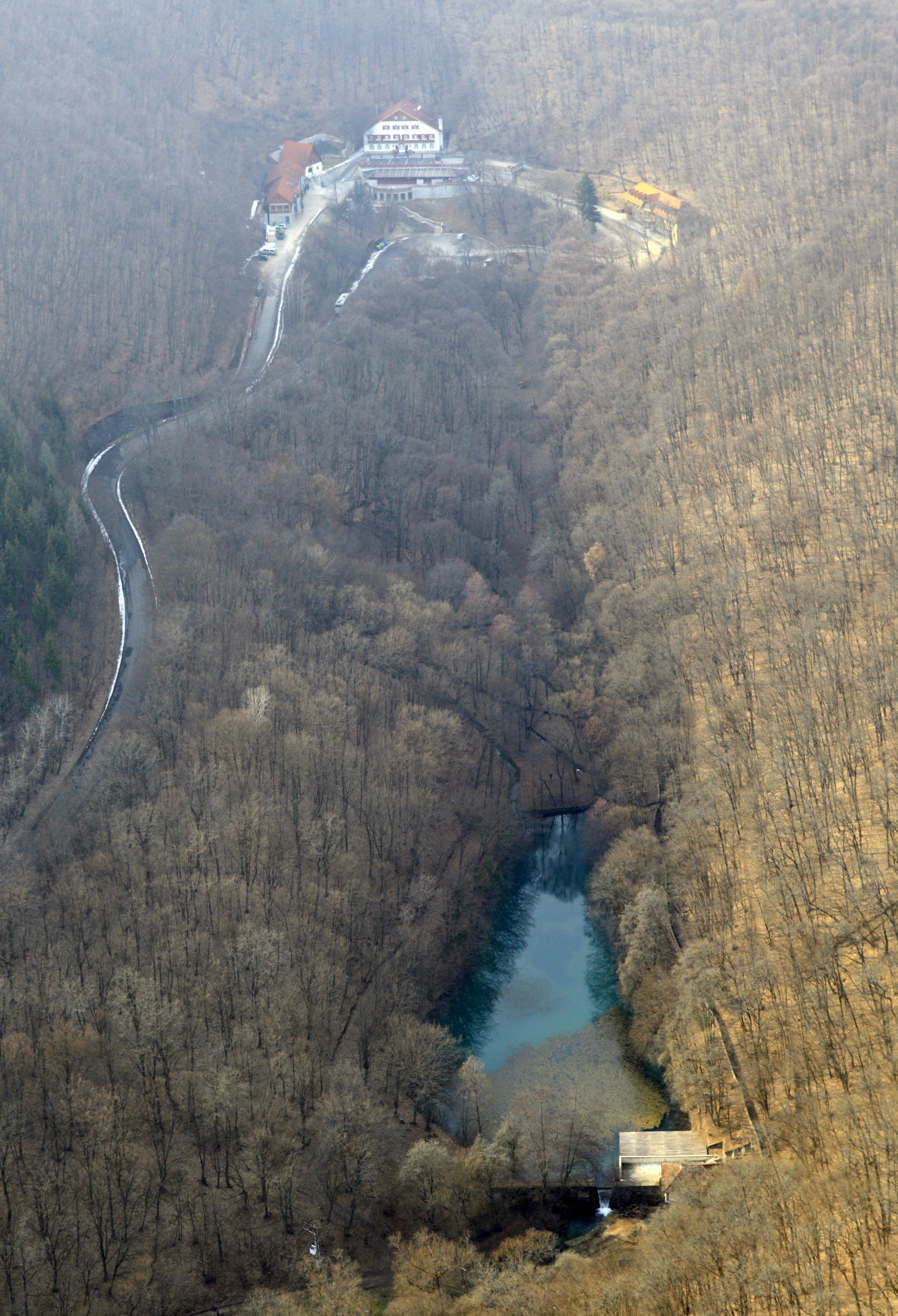
Aerial photography

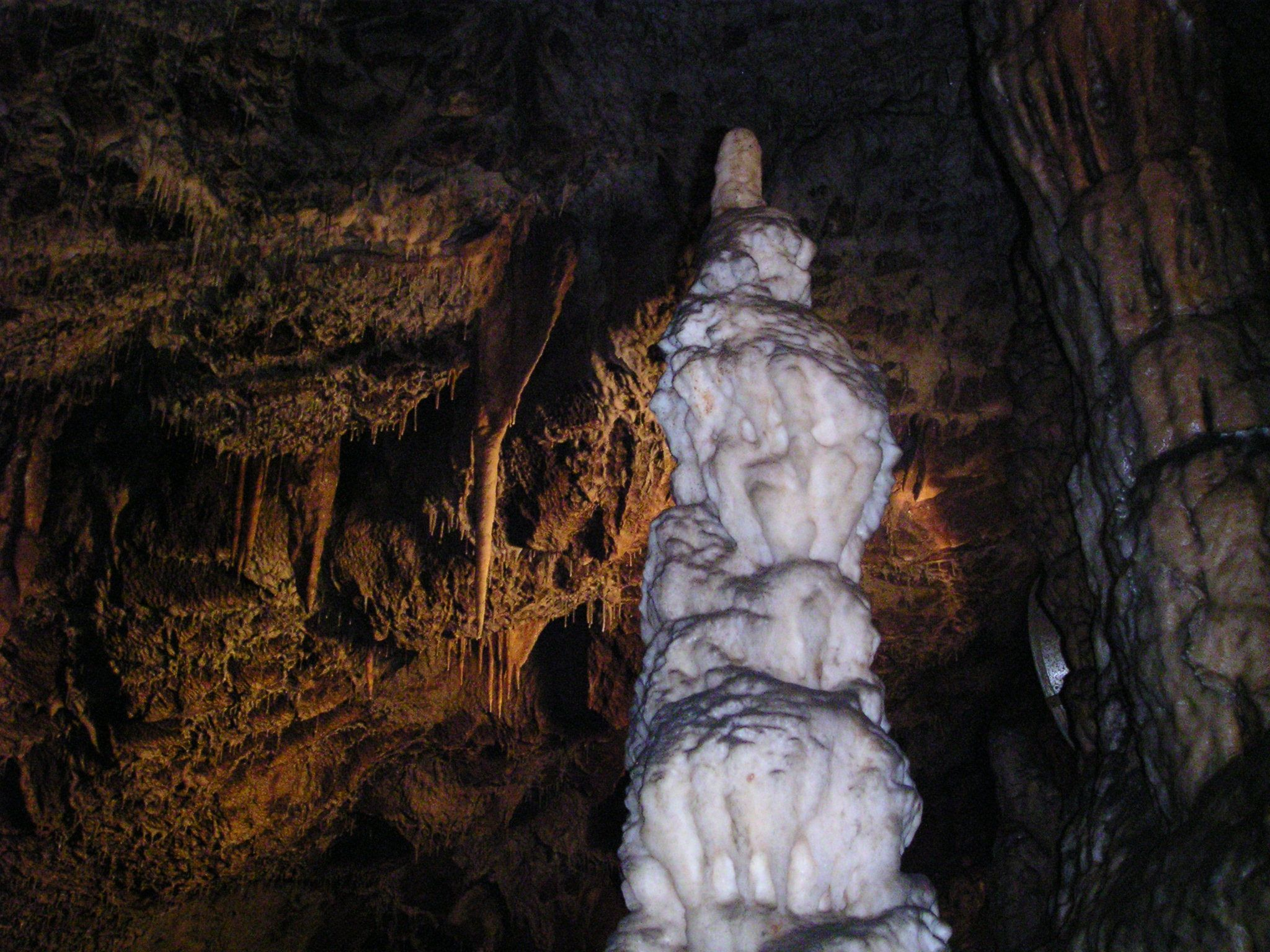
Stalagmite in Baradla cave in Jósvafő
