= Szőlősardó =

Coordinates: 48°27′N 20°38′E

- Village
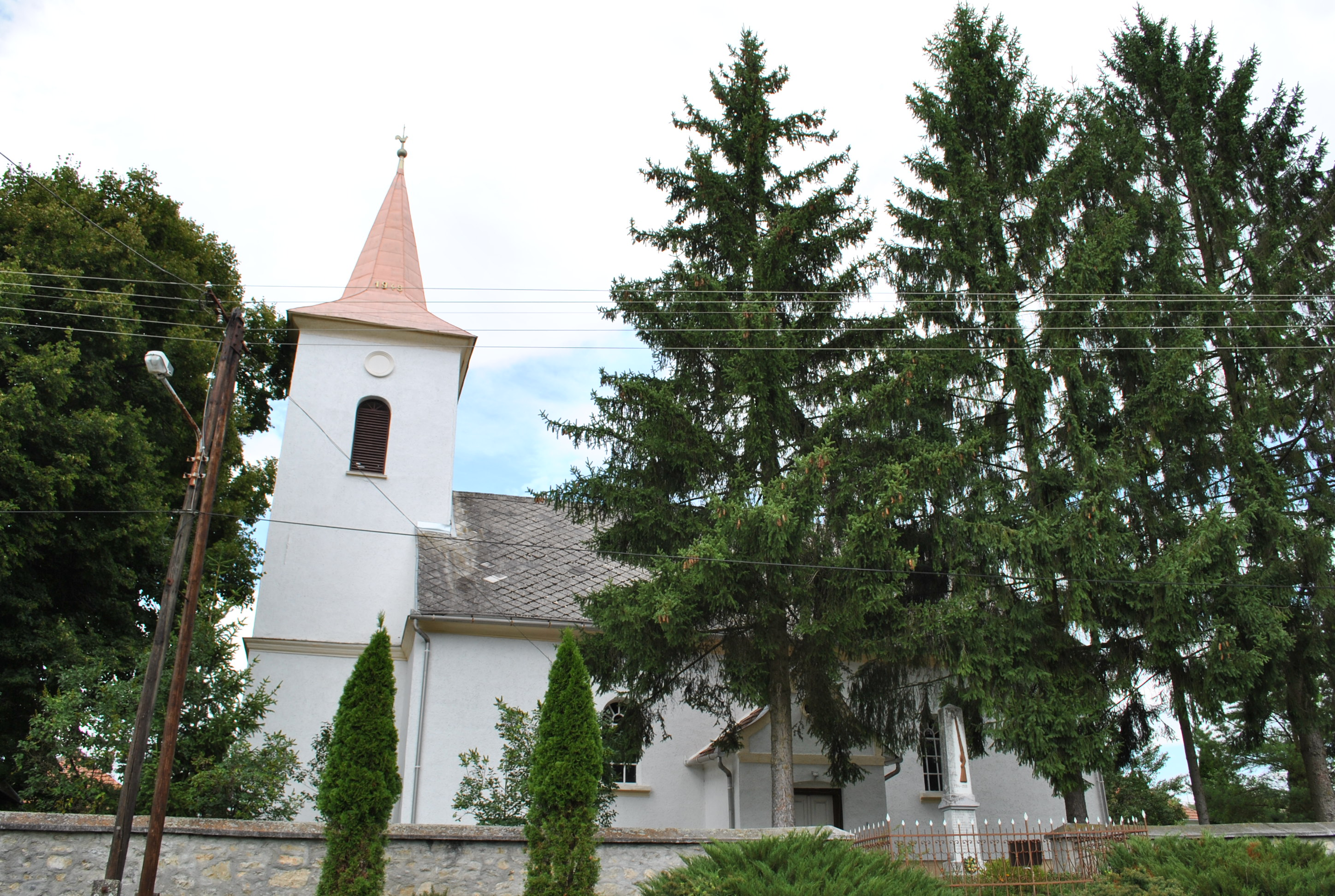
- Szőlősardó reformed church
- Interactive map of Szőlősardó
- Country: Hungary
- Regions: Northern Hungary
- County: Borsod-Abaúj-Zemplén County
- Time zone: UTC+1 (CET)
  - Summer (DST): UTC+2 (CEST)

Szőlősardó is a village in Borsod-Abaúj-Zemplén County in northeastern Hungary. It was the birthplace of Belá Ervin Graf und Freiherr von Bothmer zu Schwegerhoff.

== Notable people ==
- Arpád Albert Graf und Freiherr von Bothmer zu Schwegerhoff (1858–1938), Major General military officer
