= Szinpetri =

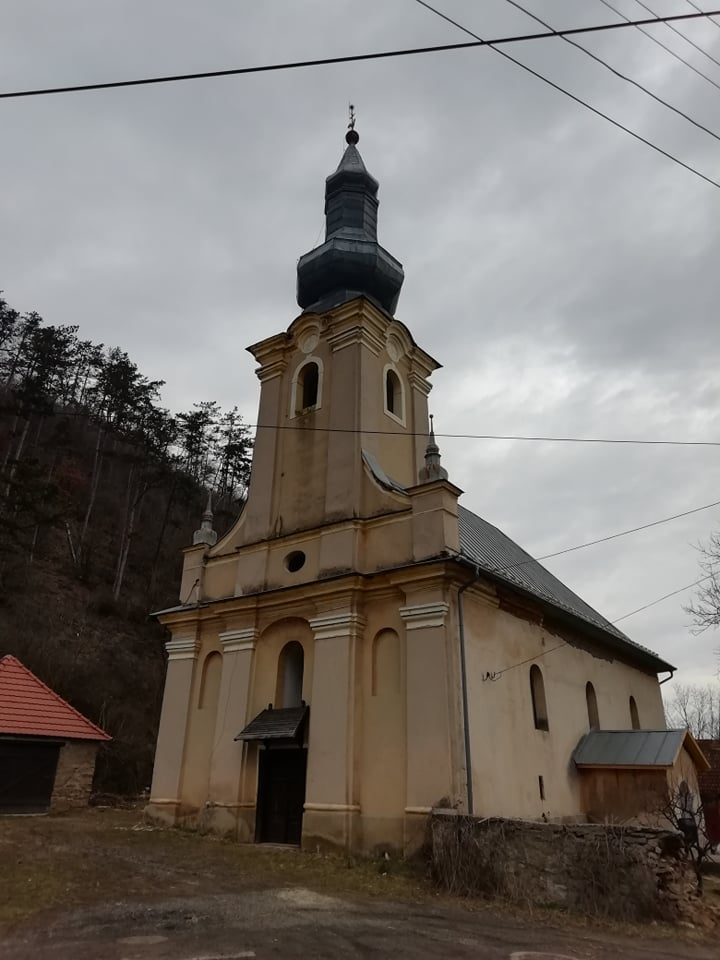
- Reformed Church in Szinpetri

- Coat of arms

- Location of Borsod-Abaúj-Zemplén county in Hungary

- Location of Szinpetri
- Coordinates: 48.48517°N 20.62392°E
- Country: Hungary
- County: Borsod-Abaúj-Zemplén

Area
  - Total: 9.71 km^{2} (3.75 sq mi)

Population (2025)
  - Total: 189
  - Density: 25.23/km^{2} (65.3/sq mi)
- Time zone: UTC+1 (CET)
  - Summer (DST): UTC+2 (CEST)
- Postal code: 3761
- Area code: 48

Szinpetri is a village in Borsod-Abaúj-Zemplén county, Hungary. It has a population of 189 people (as of 2025).

== Location ==
Szinpetri is a small village surrounded by hills in the state of Borsod-Abaúj-Zemplén. The neighbouring villages are Szin, Tornakápolna and Jósvafő.

Szinpetri is part of the Aggtelek National park which is a destinations for tourists, not only from Hungary, but from other countries as well.

The closest big city is Miskolc (about an hour away), but other towns like Edelény, Kazincbarcika and Kassa (in Slovakia) are pretty close too.

== Name ==
The name of the village comes from a frequently used first name, Péter, which was probably the name of the founder.

== Sights of the area ==
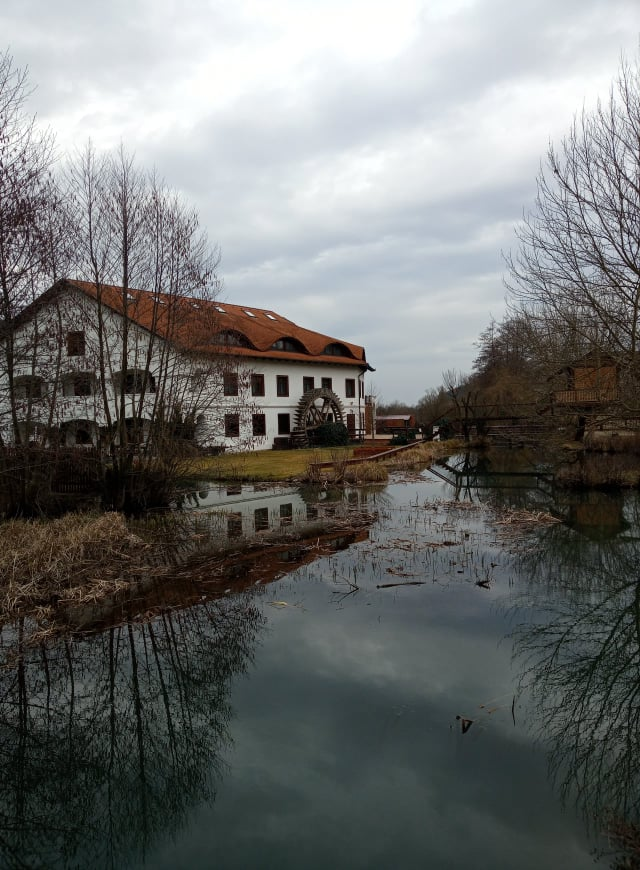
The Paper Mill Building

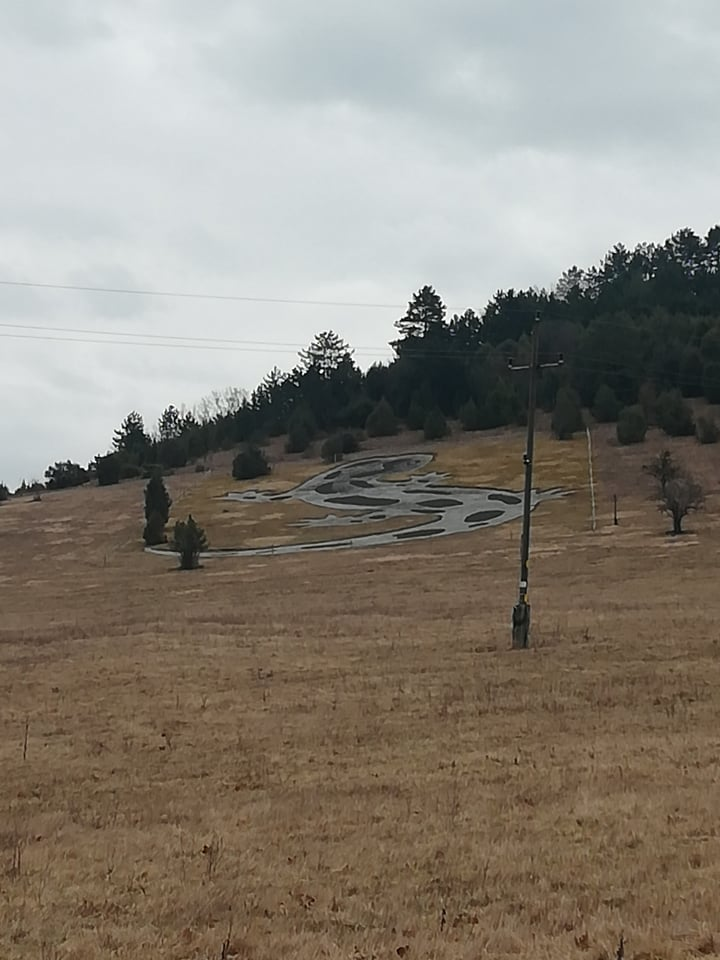
Salamander Lizard (symbol of the Aggtelek National Park)

1. The area's Paper Mill Building, contains the world's largest book, a Gutenberg Museum and a book collection that includes The Holy Bible.
2. Close to the Paper Mill Building, a large representation of a salamander lizard can be seen on the hill which is about 93 meters long and made with small pieces of rock.
3. In the middle of the village, stands a Reformed Church (built between 1792 and 1793) in which an exhibition can be found that displays facts about the historical life of the village.
4. Destinations outside of the village include the neighbouring village Jósvafő and the Aggtelek Baradla caves.

== Hunting ==
The area of the village is the home of hunters. Professionals spend 4-5 nights a week in the near forests.

In January and February they hunt for boars, foxes, deer, etc. (Boars can be hunted throughout the whole year.) In March, hunters mostly go for roes.

Hunters say it is necessary to rarefy the wild animals because they reproduce so quickly. However, they focus their hunt on the weak ones.

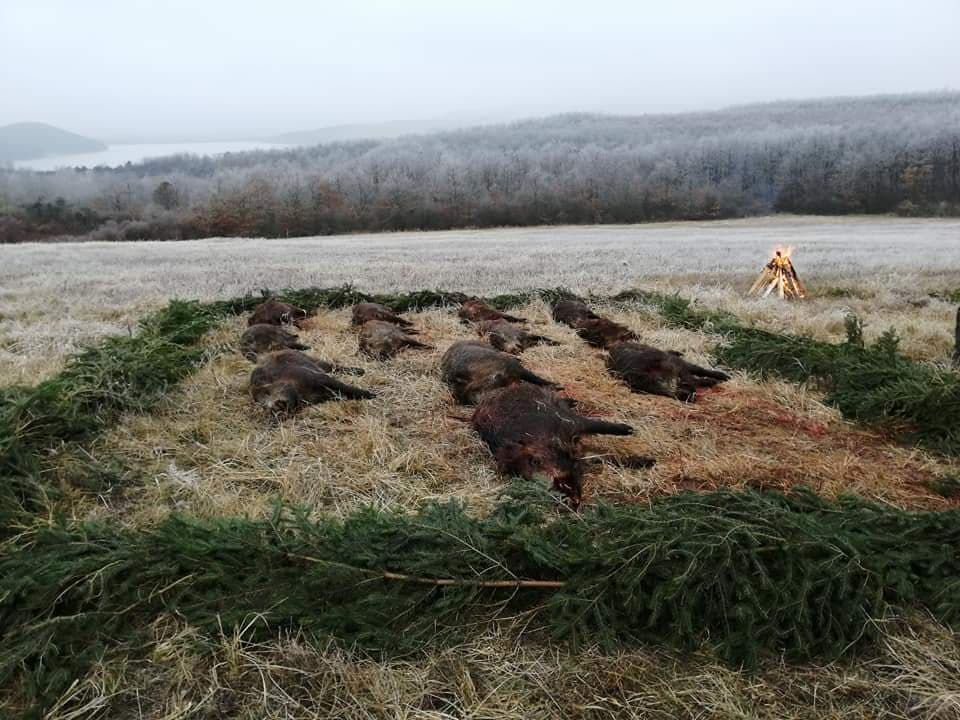
Hunting

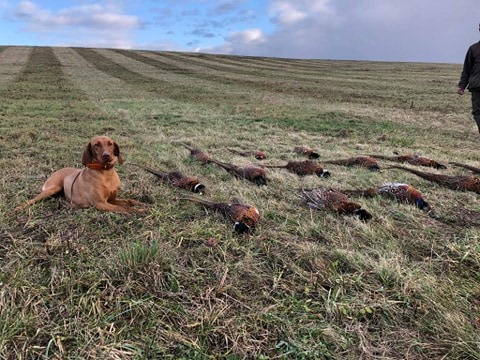
Hunting
