= Szögliget =

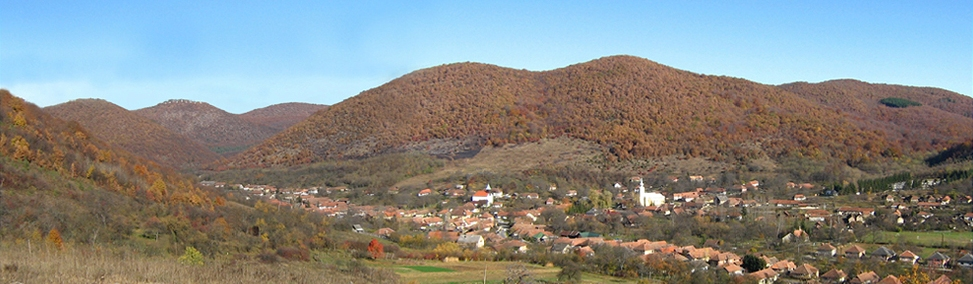

- Flag Coat of arms

- Location of Szögliget in Hungary
- Coordinates: 48.52290°N 20.67436°E
- Country: Hungary
- Region: Northern Hungary
- County: Borsod-Abaúj-Zemplén
- Subregion: Edelényi
- Rank: Village

Area
  - Total: 34.75 km^{2} (13.42 sq mi)

Population (1 January 2025)
  - Total: 516
  - Density: 14.8/km^{2} (38.5/sq mi)
- Time zone: UTC+1 (CET)
  - Summer (DST): UTC+2 (CEST)
- Postal code: 3762
- Area code: +36 48
- KSH code: 16179
- Website: www.szogliget.hu

Szögliget is a village in Borsod-Abaúj-Zemplén County, Hungary.
