= Szin =

- Coat of arms

- Location of Borsod-Abaúj-Zemplén county in Hungary

- Location of Szin
- Coordinates: 48.49713°N 20.66048°E
- Country: Hungary
- County: Borsod-Abaúj-Zemplén

Area
  - Total: 18.09 km^{2} (6.98 sq mi)

Population (2004)
  - Total: 806
  - Density: 44.55/km^{2} (115.4/sq mi)
- Time zone: UTC+1 (CET)
  - Summer (DST): UTC+2 (CEST)
- Postal code: 3761
- Area code: 48

Szin is a village in Borsod-Abaúj-Zemplén county, Hungary.
