= Égerszög =

- Village
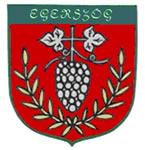
- Seal

- Location within Hungary
- Coordinates: 48°26′37.46″N 20°35′5.71″E
- Country: Hungary
- Regions: Northern Hungary
- County: Borsod-Abaúj-Zemplén County

Area
  - Total: 10.77 km^{2} (4.16 sq mi)

Population (2008)
  - Total: 53
- Time zone: UTC+1 (CET)
  - Summer (DST): UTC+2 (CEST)

Égerszög is a village in Borsod-Abaúj-Zemplén County in northeastern Hungary. As of 2008 it had a population of 53.
