= Perkupa =

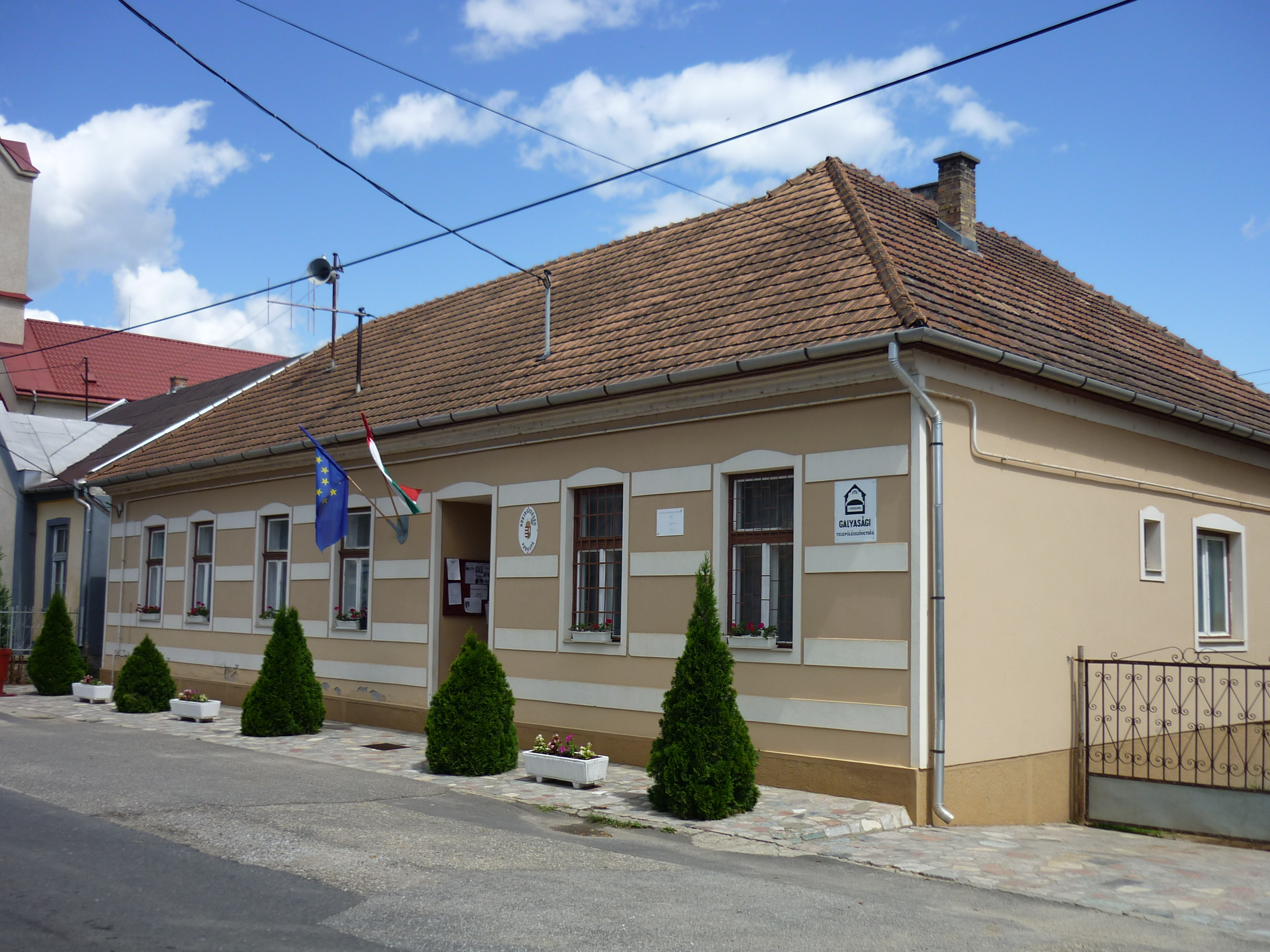
- Municipal office

- Coat of arms

- Location of Borsod-Abaúj-Zemplén county in Hungary

- Location of Perkupa
- Coordinates: 48.47125°N 20.68542°E
- Country: Hungary
- County: Borsod-Abaúj-Zemplén

Area
  - Total: 19.4 km^{2} (7.5 sq mi)

Population (2004)
  - Total: 925
  - Density: 47.68/km^{2} (123.5/sq mi)
- Time zone: UTC+1 (CET)
  - Summer (DST): UTC+2 (CEST)
- Postal code: 3756
- Area code: 48
- Website: http://www.perkupa.hu/

Perkupa is a village in Borsod-Abaúj-Zemplén county, Hungary.

== Names and etymology ==
The name is of Slavic origin: prěkopa or priekopa 'ditch'. There are several villages in Slovakia with similar names (e.g. Priekopa, Sobrance District). 1332—1335 de Precupa. The name of the part Dobódél comes from the name of Dubodiel (Trenčín District).
