= Aladar Forrói =

Hungarian nobleman

Aladar (I) Forrói
- Lord of Forró

Judge of the Queen's Court
- Reign: 1290; 1309
- Died: 1310 or 1311
- Noble family: House of Forrói
- Issue: Aladar II; James I
- Father: Csete

Aladar (I) Forrói (Hungarian: Forrói (I.) Aladár; died 1310 or 1311) was a Hungarian nobleman, whose career spanned from the second half of the 13th century to the early 14th century. He held various positions in the courts of several queen consorts for four decades.

== Family ==
Forrói was born into a family of royal servant origin, which initially possessed some landholdings in Fejér County. His father was a certain comes Csete. Forrói had a brother Alexander, ancestor of the clan's Sárszó branch, who possessed a portion in Cinkota (present-day a borough of the 16th district of Budapest) in 1295. It is possible that Alexander is identical with that young knight, who was among the defenders at the siege of Feketehalom (today Codlea, Romania) in the 1264–1265 civil war, and was granted the village of Beret in Abaúj County for his merits by King Stephen V in 1271.

== Career ==
Forrói first appears in contemporary records in 1255, when he bought the estate Moha in Fejér County from Constantine, a canon of the collegiate chapter of Székesfehérvár. Around 1259, Forrói entered the service of Duke Stephen, the son and heir of King Béla IV, which enabled his social rise. Prior to 1262, he spent three years in the Byzantine Empire in order to perform diplomatic service on behalf of his lord. Returning to Hungary, Forrói was installed as treasurer of the court of Elizabeth, the spouse of Stephen. He held the position from 1262 at least until 1263. Forrói informed the duke (and also rex iunior) of the birth of his son Ladislaus, who was born on 5 August 1262. Because of this and his service, Forrói was granted five villages located in the valley of river Hernád in Abaúj (or Újvár) County – Forró, Devecser (today a borough of Encs), Fancsal, Őzd and Gata – with perpetual right and free disposition from Stephen in December 1262, declaring the previous donation letters about them invalid. Before that, all villages belonged to the royal domain of Abaújvár Castle. Simultaneously, Queen Maria Laskarina also donated the land Orjavica in Požega County (laid in present-day Nova Kapela in Croatia) to Forrói for bringing the news of her grandson's birth. In addition, Stephen donated further lands in Bereg County – Szentmiklós near Munkács, Szolyva, Verecke and Kölcsény (present-day Chynadiiovo, Mukachevo, Svaliava, Nyzhni Vorota and Kolchyno in Ukraine, respectively) – to Forrói in another charter issued in 1263, for bringing him the news of the birth of his son. Béla IV confirmed these donations in his own royal charter in 1263.

In exchange for Szentmiklós and Szolyva, rex iunior Stephen bestowed the villages Kécs, Fáj and Szend in Abaúj County to Forrói in 1264. Soon, Forrói began to establish a lordship centered around Forró in the valley of Hernád. It is probable that Forrói was among those lords, who defected to the court of Béla IV during (or shortly before) the 1264–1265 civil war between the king and his son Stephen. Therefore, Stephen, who ultimately defeated his father and remained de facto ruler of Eastern Hungary, confiscated the lordship of Forró (and also Orjavica) from Forrói. However, it is also possible that the relationship between Stephen and Forrói deteriorated only after the duke ascended the Hungarian throne in 1270 (perhaps, in this case, he was among those lords, who fled Hungary and took an oath of allegiance to Ottokar II of Bohemia after Stephen's coronation). Stephen V donated the lordship of Forró with the surrounding villages (and other non-related estates) to his Judge royal Nicholas Monoszló in May 1271, without mentioning Forrói's previous ownership. Around the same time, Kölcsény was also owned by another nobleman Michael Rosd. After the death of Stephen V in 1272, Forrói swore loyalty to Dowager Queen Elizabeth, who nominally ruled the realm as regent during Ladislaus' minority, when rivaling baronial groups fought for the supreme power. Forrói requested Ladislaus IV to return the formerly confiscated landholdings. In January 1273, Ladislaus (or rather the royal council on his behalf) confirmed his father's previous donation letter from 1262, stating that although Stephen did indeed confiscate the lands in his "anger", the previous loyal service of Forrói cannot be undone. Consequently, Forrói again became the possessor of the Forró lordship. Around the same time, Dowager Queen Elizabeth gave the estate Orjavica back to Forrói.

He was styled as steward of the queenly court of Isabella of Sicily, the queen consort of Ladislaus IV in 1274. During that time, Forrói filed a lawsuit against Geanus (or Gyanus), a canon of Székesfehérvár and other local landowners over a disputed land laid between Szentgyörgy and Apáti in Zala County before the judicial court of Judge royal Nicholas Gutkeled. Forrói successfully proved that he had previously received the land as a royal grant. Still in that year, he was replaced as steward by Herrand Héder. In early 1275, Ladislaus IV sent Forrói to the court of Rudolf I of Germany in order to propose a marriage between the king's younger brother, Andrew, Duke of Slavonia and a relative of Rudolf. The document describes Forrói as the king's "loyal confidant, own familiaris and special envoy". In February 1275, Ladislaus IV exempted the villages of Forró, Devecser, Fancsal and Fáj from the supremacy of the ispán of Abaúj County and placed them directly under the jurisdiction of the royal court of justice due to permanent bias. Forrói was referred to as ispán of Nógrád County by a single document in 1277. Beside that he again served as steward for Queen Isabella from 1277 to 1279. As part of a six-member delegation, he represented Ladislaus IV in Vienna in July 1277, when the king entered into an alliance with Rudolf against Ottokar II. In 1279, Forrói was embroiled into conflict with the local nobles of Kécs, the gens (clan) Apc. On this occasion, one of them Mikó was killed. Forrói compensated his brothers with forty marks and handed over the estate Fáj to them as a blood price until the amount is paid.

Forrói functioned as count (head) of the court of Dowager Queen Elizabeth in 1282. She was then acted as Duchess of Macsó and Bosnia. Forrói lost the dignity in 1286 at the latest. In the upcoming years, he again entered the service of the queen consort Isabella. He was styled as count (or head) of her queenly court in May 1290, not long before the assassination of Ladislaus IV. Forrói did not hold any court positions during the reign of Andrew III. The Forrói family, along with majority of the landowners were forced the enter the service of the powerful oligarch Amadeus Aba, who ruled Northeast Hungary independent of the royal power at least since the early 1290s. Forrói filed a lawsuit over the estate Kölcsény (which he formerly possessed) against James the Kuke (progenitor of the prestigious Lónyay family) in early 1296. Judge royal Apor Péc ruled in favor of Forrói. During a lawsuit over the estate Fony, Forrói represented the interests of the plaintiff Catherine Csák as her lawyer in December 1297. Forrói won the case for Catherine, presenting a former letter of donation of the late Duke Stephen to her mother Agnes from 1269; she ultimately was progenitress of the Fonyi family. Forrói acted as co-judge during a lawsuit in July 1299.

As a familiaris of Amadeus Aba, Forrói and his family were supporters of Charles of Anjou during the era of interregnum. Forrói attended the second coronation of Charles I in Buda on 15 June 1309. He was referred to as "baron" on that occasion. In the same year, he functioned as count or judge of the queenly court of Maria of Bytom, the spouse of Charles I. Due to his advanced age and declining health, Forrói divided his estates between his two sons, Aladar (II) and James (I). The latter was granted Szentmiklós, Szolyva and Verecke (by that time, the Forróis owned them again) without reserving any rights for himself and his elder son. In his another charter, he divided the Forró lordship – Forró, Devecser, Fancsal and Lak –, the estate Orjavica in Požega County and vineyards in Somogy County between Aladar (II) and James. The elderly Forrói was last mentioned as a living person in September 1310, when he and his sons bought Felináncs from the clan Zoárd.

== Descendants ==
Forrói died in 1310 or 1311. It is plausible that he was already dead, when Amadeus Aba was assassinated in September 1311 in Kassa (today Košice, Slovakia). Charles I arbitrated an agreement between Amadeus' sons and the town, which also prescribed that the Abas withdraw from two counties and allow the noblemen inhabiting their domains to freely join Charles. In accordance with the treaty, Aladar (II) and James were two of the 47 lords, who offered hostages in order to preserve lasting peace. However, the Abas soon entered into an alliance with Matthew Csák against the king, which resulted in his familiares having to decide between serving the king or the influential clan.

The brothers chose a different path. James swore oath of allegiance to Charles I. He fought in the Battle of Rozgony against the Aba clan on 15 June 1312, where he was killed. Aladar (II) remained a partisan of the local oligarchic domain of the Aba clan. In December 1312, his troops assaulted a bailiff of the new pro-royal ispán Michael Szikszói in his estate Fancsal. He was among the supporters of Matthew Csák in 1316. The Forrói family survived only one more generation. The most influential of them all was John, a son of James, who was vice-ispán of Abaúj County in 1342. He died without descendants around 1360, ending the Forrói line after three generations.

== Sources ==
- Bartha, Annamária (2015). "A királynéi udvarbírói tisztség és viselői Károly Róbert uralkodása idején [The Judges of the Queen's Court and During the Reign of Charles I (1301–1342)]". In Tóber, Márta; Maléth, Ágnes (eds.). Középkortörténeti tanulmányok 8 (in Hungarian). University of Szeged. pp. 91–103. ISBN 978-963-315-242-3.
- Engel, Pál (1996). Magyarország világi archontológiája, 1301–1457, I. [Secular Archontology of Hungary, 1301–1457, Volume I] (in Hungarian). História, MTA Történettudományi Intézete. ISBN 963-8312-44-0.
- Kristó, Gyula (1999). "I. Károly király főúri elitje (1301–1309) [The Aristocratic Elite of King Charles I, 1301–1309]". Századok (in Hungarian). 133 (1). Magyar Történelmi Társulat: 41–62. ISSN 0039-8098.
- Rudolf, Veronika (2023). Közép-Európa a hosszú 13. században [Central Europe in the Long 13th Century] (in Hungarian). Arpadiana XV., Research Centre for the Humanities. ISBN 978-963-416-406-7.
- Zsoldos, Attila (1997). "Kassa túszai (Pillanatfelvétel 1311-ből Aba Amadé famíliájáról) [The Hostages of Kassa (A Snapshot of Amadeus Aba's Family from 1311)]". Történelmi Szemle (in Hungarian). 39 (3–4). Hungarian Academy of Sciences: 345–362. ISSN 0040-9634.
- Zsoldos, Attila (2005). Az Árpádok és asszonyaik. A királynéi intézmény az Árpádok korában [The Árpáds and their Women: The Institution of Queenship in the Era of the Árpáds] (in Hungarian). MTA Történettudományi Intézete. ISBN 963-8312-98-X.
- Zsoldos, Attila (2007). Családi ügy: IV. Béla és István ifjabb király viszálya az 1260-as években [A family affair: The Conflict between Béla IV and Junior King Stephen in the 1260s] (in Hungarian). História, MTA Történettudományi Intézete. ISBN 978-963-9627-15-4.
- Zsoldos, Attila (2009). "Miklós országbíró [Judge royal Nicholas]". In Neumann, Tibor; Rácz, György (eds.). Honoris causa. Tanulmányok Engel Pál tiszteletére (Analecta mediaevalia III) (in Hungarian). PPKE Történettudományi Intézete. pp. 519–549. ISBN 978-963-9627-25-3.
- Zsoldos, Attila (2011). Magyarország világi archontológiája, 1000–1301 [Secular Archontology of Hungary, 1000–1301] (in Hungarian). História, MTA Történettudományi Intézete. ISBN 978-963-9627-38-3.
