= Encs District =

Coordinates: 48.3833°N 21.0667°E

Encs District Encsi járás
- Districts of Hungary
- Coat of arms

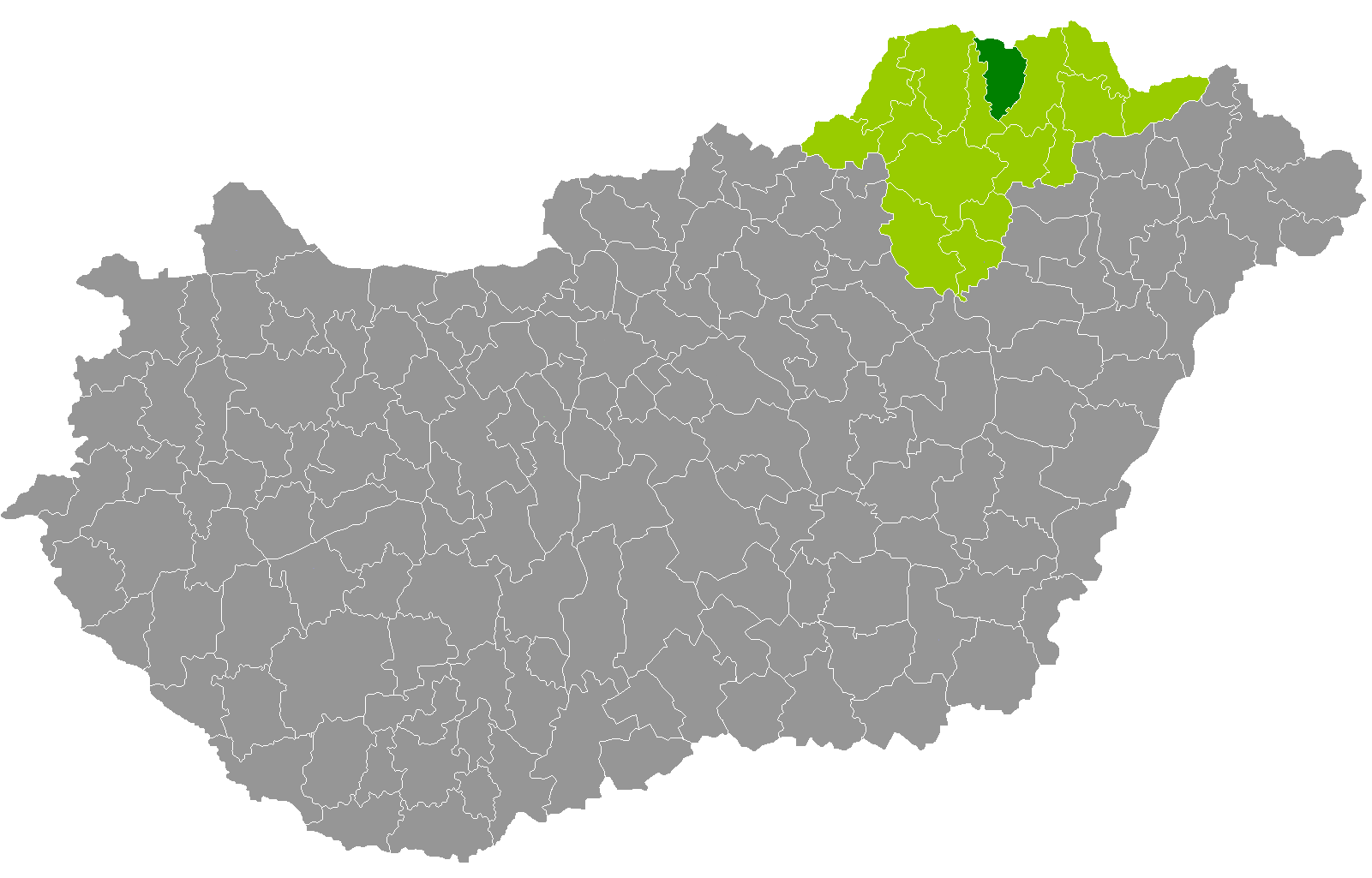
- Encs District within Hungary and Borsod-Abaúj-Zemplén County.
- Country: Hungary
- County: Borsod-Abaúj-Zemplén
- District seat: Encs

Area
  - Total: 378.39 km^{2} (146.10 sq mi)
  - Rank: 10th in Borsod-Abaúj-Zemplén

Population (2011 census)
  - Total: 21,390
  - Rank: 10th in Borsod-Abaúj-Zemplén
  - Density: 56/km^{2} (150/sq mi)

Encs (Hungarian: Encsi járás) is a district in northern part of Borsod-Abaúj-Zemplén County. Encs is also the town where the district seat is found. The district is located in the Northern Hungary statistical region.

== Geography ==
Encs District borders with the Slovak Košice Region to the north, Gönc District to the east and south, Szikszó District and Edelény District to the south and west. The number of the inhabited places in Encs District is 29.

== Municipalities ==
The district has one town (bolded) and 28 villages. (ordered by population, as of 1 January 2012)

- Alsógagy (96)
- Baktakék (716)
- Beret (274)
- Büttös (174)
- Csenyéte (451)
- Csobád (680)
- Detek (279)
- **Encs** (6,197) – district seat
- Fáj (364)
- Fancsal (301)
- Felsőgagy (173)
- Forró (2,466)
- Fulókércs (400)
- Gagyapáti (13)
- Garadna (441)
- Hernádpetri (254)
- Hernádszentandrás (465)
- Hernádvécse (1,001)
- Ináncs (1,268)
- Kány (59)
- Keresztéte (70)
- Krasznokvajda (441)
- Litka (49)
- Méra (1,754)
- Novajidrány (1,398)
- Perecse (40)
- Pusztaradvány (257)
- Szalaszend (1,108)
- Szemere (373)

== Demographics ==
Religion in Encs District (2011 census)
1. Catholic Church (53.8%)
2. Greek Catholicism (9.40%)
3. Calvinism (15.8%)
4. Lutheranism (1.30%)
5. Other religions (0.80%)
6. Non-religious (4.10%)
7. Atheists (0.20%)
8. Undeclared (14.6%)

In 2011, it had a population of 21,390 and the population density was 56/km^{2}.

Year	County population	Change
2011	21,390	n/a

=== Ethnicity ===
Besides the Hungarian majority, the main minority is the Roma (approx. 5,000).

Total population (2011 census): 21,390
Ethnic groups (2011 census): Identified themselves: 25,108 persons:

- Hungarians: 19,862 (79.11%)
- Gypsies: 4,973 (19.81%)
- Others and indefinable: 273 (1.09%)

Approx. 4,000 persons in Encs District did declare more than one ethnic group at the 2011 census.

=== Religion ===
Religious adherence in the county according to 2011 census:

- Catholic – 13,537 (Roman Catholic – 11,519; Greek Catholic – 2,013);
- Reformed – 3,371;
- Evangelical – 277;
- other religions – 172;
- Non-religious – 868;
- Atheism – 41;
- Undeclared – 3,124.

== Gallery ==
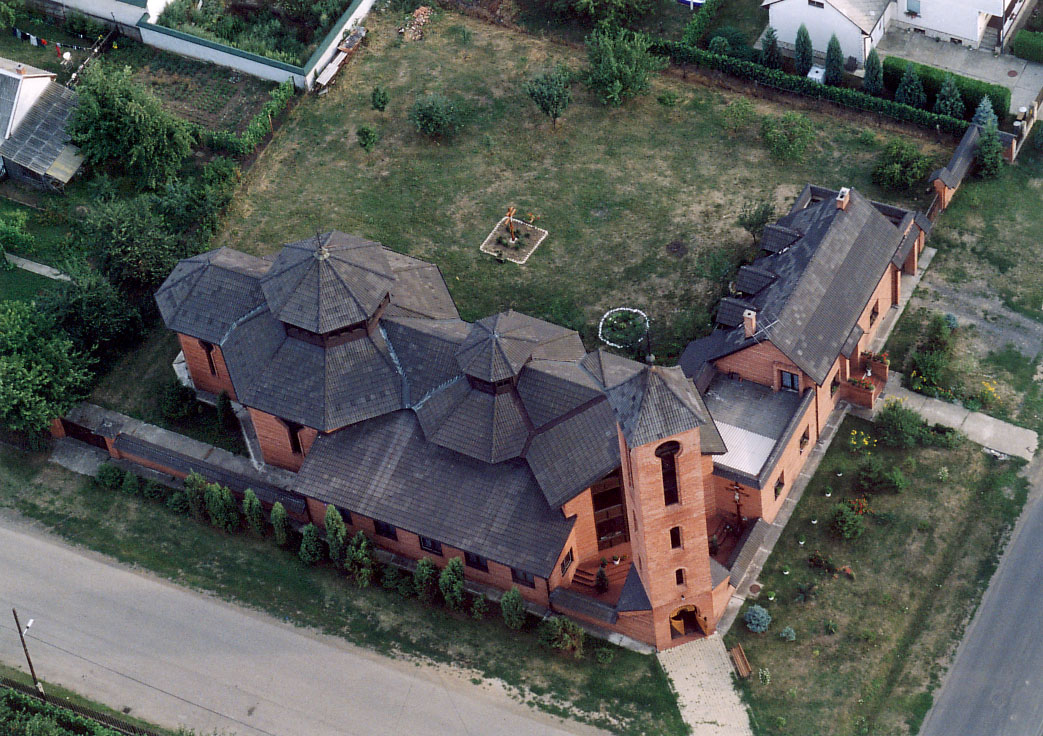
Encs, the district seat

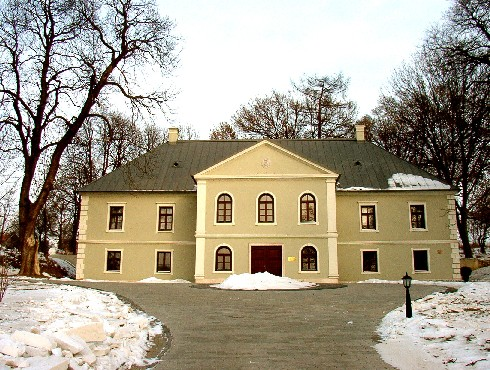
Pallavicini Mansion in Pusztaradvány

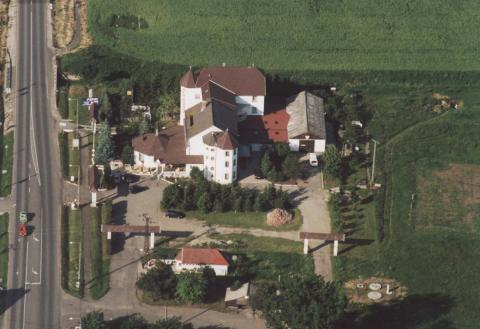
Aerial view of Forró

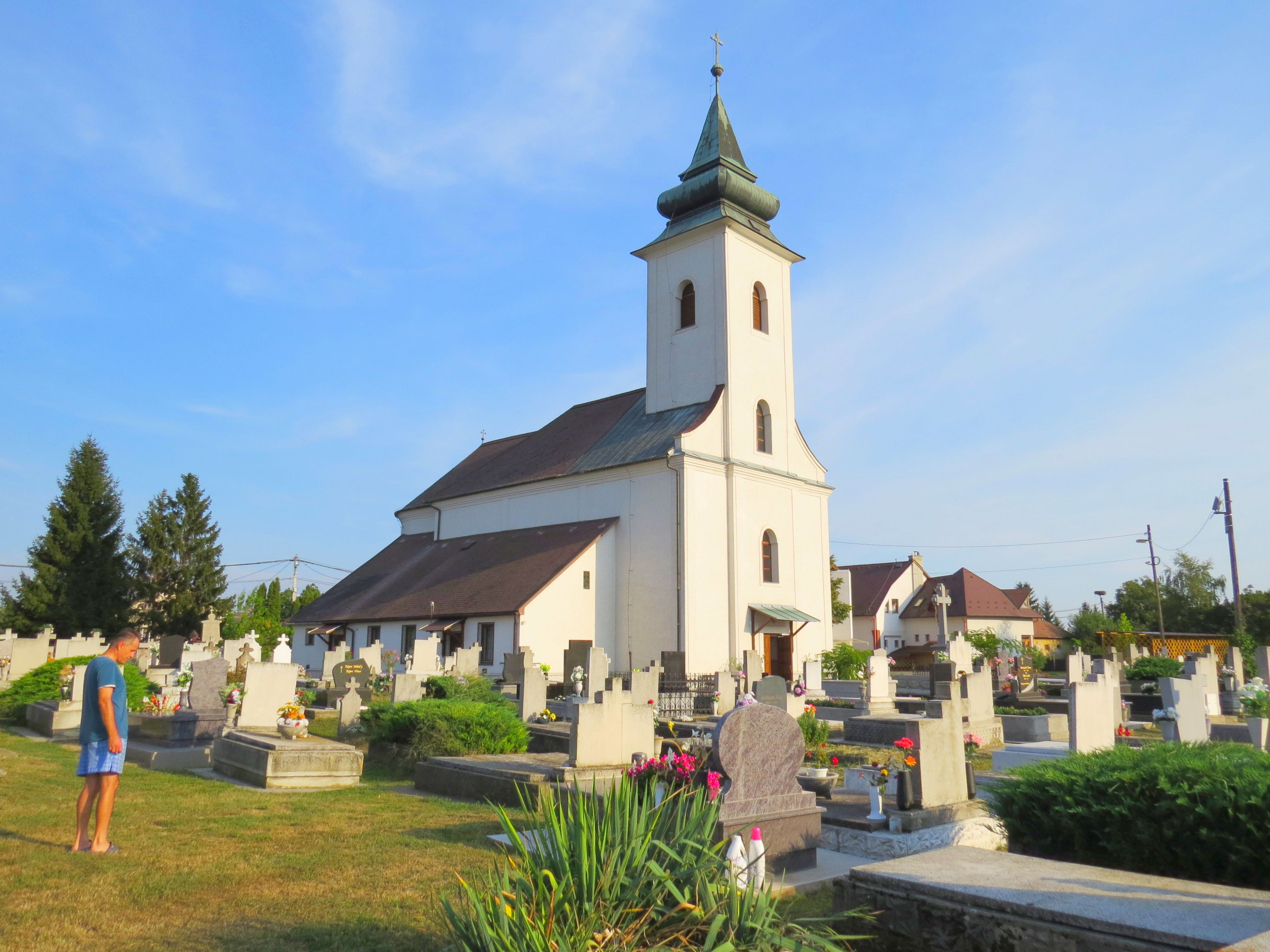
St. Teresa Church in Ináncs

== See also ==
- List of cities and towns of Hungary
