= Abaújalpár =

- Village
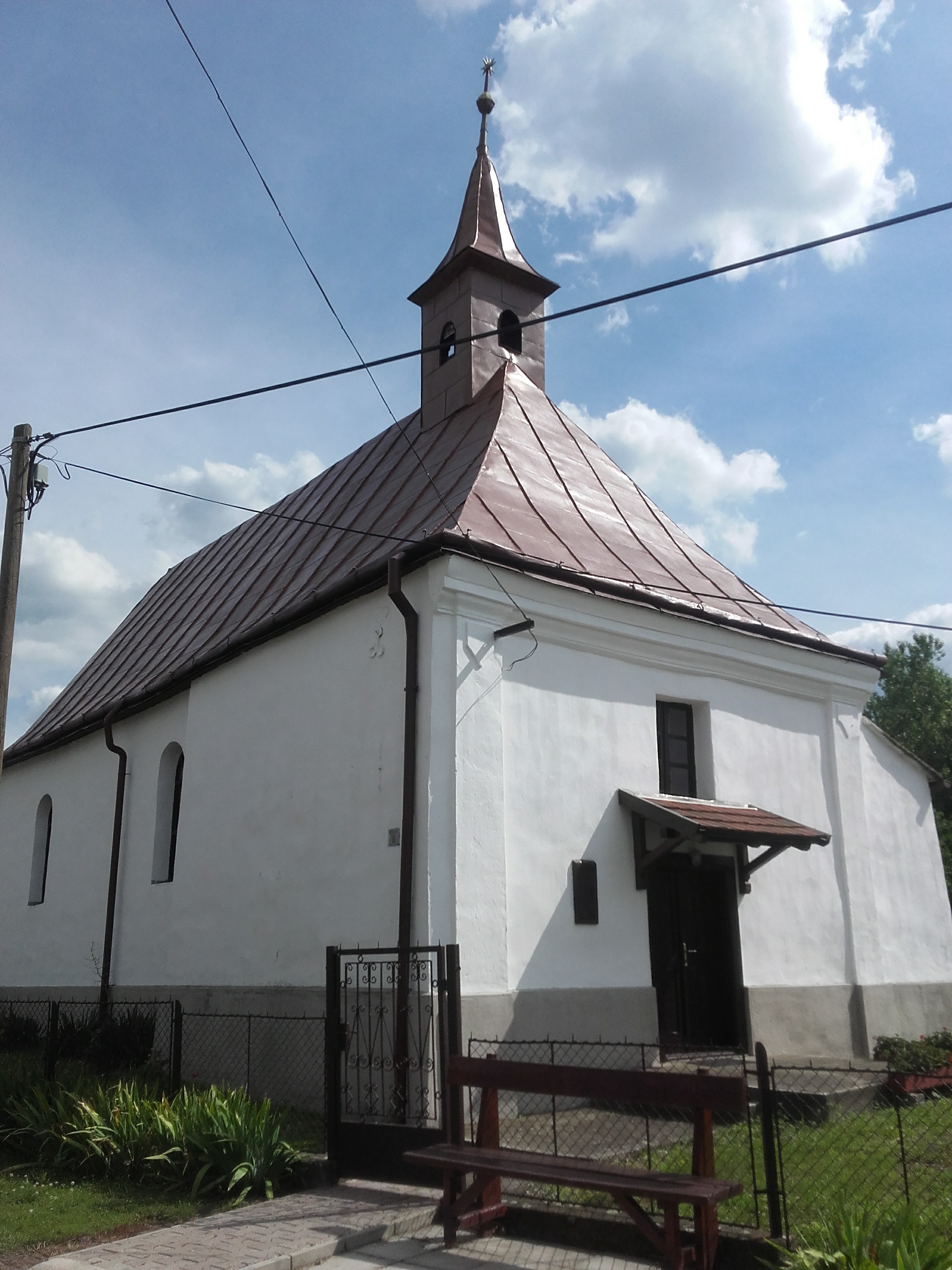
- Church in Abaújalpár

- Flag Coat of arms

- Location of Abaújalpár
- Coordinates: 48.30675°N 21.2329°E
- Country: Hungary
- Region: Northern Hungary
- County: Borsod-Abaúj-Zemplén
- District: Gönc

Area
  - Total: 8.48 km^{2} (3.27 sq mi)

Population (1 January 2026)
  - Total: 75
  - Density: 8.8/km^{2} (23/sq mi)
- Time zone: UTC+1 (CET)
  - Summer (DST): UTC+2 (CEST)
- Postal code: 3882
- Area code: (+36) 47
- Website: www.abaujalpar.hu

Abaújalpár is a village in the district of Gönc, Borsod-Abaúj-Zemplén county, Hungary.

Few Jews lived in the village and to this day there are Jewish gravestones in the area.

== Geography ==
It is located in the North Hungarian Mountains, in the western part of the Zemplén Mountains, 9 kilometers southeast of Encs and about 50 kilometers northeast of Miskolc, the county seat. Its area is 848 hectares, of which 22 hectares are inner areas and 826 hectares are outer areas, mostly forest.

The neighboring settlements are: Boldogkőújfalu to the north, Sima to the east, Abaújkér-Aranyospuszta to the south, and Abaújkér to the west; its southeastern border touches the outer areas belonging to Abaújszántó, a town that lies to its southwest.

Accessibility The main road access route is the 3714 road, which runs along the western edge of its inner area, providing access from Abaújszántó and Gönc. Its main street is the secondary road numbered 37 108, and its southern border is also touched by the 3705 road.

From more distant parts of the country, it can be reached via the main road 3, turning off at Encs, or from the main road 37 through the Szerencs-Abaújszántó or Szegilong-Erdőbénye route. Public road transport is provided by Volánbusz buses.

No railway line passes through it, but the Abaújszántó railway station and Abaújkér stop on the Szerencs–Hidasnémeti railway line are just a few kilometers away from the settlement.

== History ==
"Alpár, a Hungarian village in Abaúj County, located 1 3/4 hours from Bodókő-Váralja: with 61 Roman Catholics, 10 Greek Catholics, 5 Lutherans, 200 Reformed, and 50 Jewish residents. It has a Reformed church, a vineyard hill, and a forest. Multiple landowners."

"ALPÁR. A medium-sized Hungarian village in Abaúj County, owned by several noble families, with Reformed residents, located not far from Tzekeháza. Its lands are fertile, and it has good vineyard hills; however, its pastures are limited, and there is no timber available for construction, classifying it as second-class."

The settlement was first mentioned in 1330 under the name Alpar. At that time, it was still owned by the Aba clan, and later, from 1370, by the Alpáry family. Its former landlord, Alpáry Sámuel, became known as a leader in the noble uprising of 1551–1565. After the Alpáry family died out, the land came into the possession of the Szemere and Darvas families. During the Turkish occupation, the village was destroyed and was not listed as an inhabited place in the 1715 census. In the 1720 census, it was recorded as a manorial settlement without a peasant population, with only one noble resident, Gadnai István. Around the 1730s, Protestant Hungarians settled in the village. In 1828, the landowners were the Darvas and Szánky families.

The village received its current name in 1905, when several noble families' mansions stood there. After World War II, these mansions fell into decay, as they were mainly used for economic purposes.
