= John Forrói =

Hungarian nobleman

- Lord of Forró

Vice-ispán of Abaúj County
- Reign: 1342
- Died: c. 1360
- Noble family: House of Forrói
- Spouse: Elizabeth Imregi
- Issue: none
- Father: James I

John Forrói (Hungarian: Forrói János; died around 1360) was a Hungarian nobleman in the first half of the 14th century, who served as vice-ispán of Abaúj County in 1342.

== Background ==
Forrói was born into a noble family, which possessed lands mostly in Abaúj and Bereg counties. His grandfather was Aladar, who acquired the lordship of Forró with its neighboring villages in the 1260s. By the early 14th century, the entire family entered the service of the powerful oligarch Amadeus Aba. Forrói's parents were James (I) and his wife, who later became the spouse of Stephen Zoárd (or Szentandrási, "Stephen the Page"). Forrói had a brother James (II) and a half-sister Kanicsa ("Rose"), the wife of Pócs Piskárkosi.

Forrói's father James inherited the villages Szentmiklós, Szolyva and Verecke (present-day Chynadiiovo, Svaliava, Nyzhni Vorota and Kolchyno in Ukraine, respectively) from Aladar in 1310. The Forró lordship was also divided between James and his brother Aladar (II). Following the assassination of Amadeus Aba in September 1311 and the subsequent hostile relationship between Charles I of Hungary and the clan Aba, James swore loyalty to the monarch. He fought in the Battle of Rozgony against the Abas on 15 June 1312, where he was killed.

== Career ==
Forrói entered the service of Philip Drugeth, a strong confidant of Charles I, who became the new provincial lord of Northeast Hungary following the Abas' defeat. It is plausible that Forrói faithfully fought against the Abas in Charles' war of unification, because Philip Drugeth returned the customs revenues and its right of collection to Forrói in 1319. Forrói was able to recover the Forró lordship for his family due to his pro-royal service. When his half-sister Kanicsa (the daughter of Stephen Zoárd and Forrói's mother) get married Pócs Piskárkosi, Forrói handed over his estate Fancsal to him in 1333.

Forrói was styled as vice-ispán of Abaúj County on 3 September 1342, only days before the death of his lord William Drugeth. Forrói possessed a portion in Devecser (today a borough of Encs) still in 1358, while his cousins already sold their portions to the Szentandrási family. Forrói married Elizabeth, the daughter of Andrew Imregi from the Kaplon clan. Forrói sold his estate Őszöd to his wife in 1356. He died without descendants around 1360, ending the Forrói line after three generations.

== Sources ==
- Bartha, Annamária (2015). "A királynéi udvarbírói tisztség és viselői Károly Róbert uralkodása idején [The Judges of the Queen's Court and During the Reign of Charles I (1301–1342)]". In Tóber, Márta; Maléth, Ágnes (eds.). Középkortörténeti tanulmányok 8 (in Hungarian). University of Szeged. pp. 91–103. ISBN 978-963-315-242-3.
- Engel, Pál (1996). Magyarország világi archontológiája, 1301–1457, I. [Secular Archontology of Hungary, 1301–1457, Volume I] (in Hungarian). História, MTA Történettudományi Intézete. ISBN 963-8312-44-0.
- Zsoldos, Attila (1997). "Kassa túszai (Pillanatfelvétel 1311-ből Aba Amadé famíliájáról) [The Hostages of Kassa (A Snapshot of Amadeus Aba's Family from 1311)]". Történelmi Szemle (in Hungarian). 39 (3–4). Hungarian Academy of Sciences: 345–362. ISSN 0040-9634.
- Zsoldos, Attila (2017). A Druget-tartomány története 1315–1342 [The History of the Druget Province 1315–1342] (in Hungarian). MTA Bölcsészettudományi Kutatóközpont Történettudományi Intézete. ISBN 978-963-4160-63-2.
