= Gönc District =

Gönc District Gönci járás
- Districts of Hungary
- Coat of arms

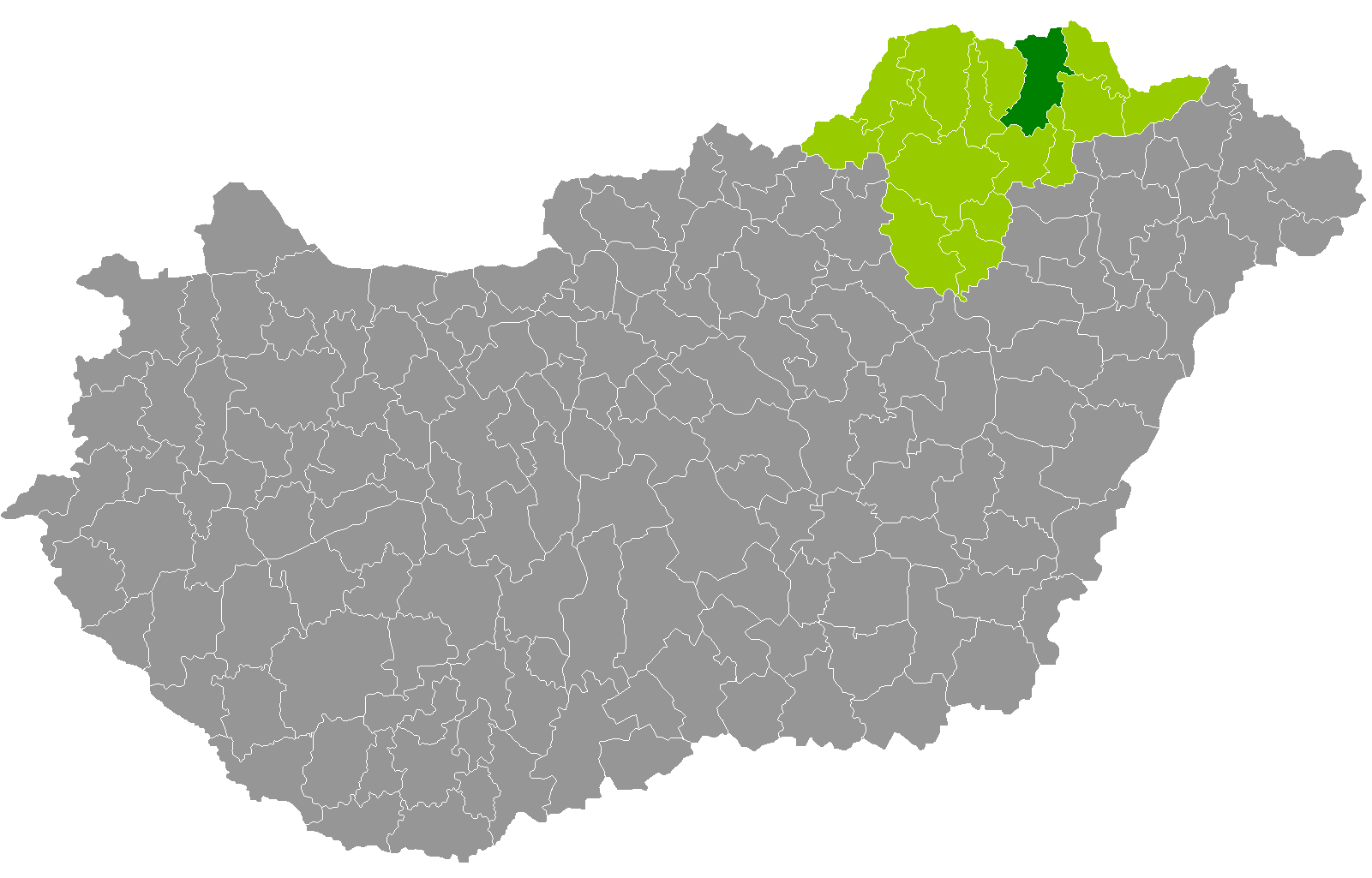
- Gönc District within Hungary and Borsod-Abaúj-Zemplén County.
- Coordinates: 48.47°N 21.27°E
- Country: Hungary
- County: Borsod-Abaúj-Zemplén
- District seat: Gönc

Area
  - Total: 549.67 km^{2} (212.23 sq mi)
  - Rank: 4th in Borsod-Abaúj-Zemplén

Population (2011 census)
  - Total: 19,275
  - Rank: 12th in Borsod-Abaúj-Zemplén
  - Density: 35/km^{2} (91/sq mi)

Gönc (Hungarian: Gönci járás) is a district in north-eastern part of Borsod-Abaúj-Zemplén County. Gönc is also the town where the district seat is found. The district is located in the Northern Hungary statistical region.

== Geography ==
Gönc District borders with the Slovak Košice Region to the north, Sátoraljaújhely District and Sárospatak District to the east, Tokaj District and Szerencs District to the south, Szikszó District and Encs District to the west. The number of the inhabited places in Gönc District is 30.

== Municipalities ==
The district has two towns (bolded) and 28 villages. (ordered by population, as of 1 January 2012)

- Abaújalpár (76)
- Abaújkér (667)
- **Abaújszántó** (3,088)
- Abaújvár (206)
- Arka (73)
- Baskó (183)
- Boldogkőújfalu (544)
- Boldogkőváralja (1,084)
- Felsődobsza (882)
- Fony (343)
- Gibárt (374)
- **Gönc** (1,951) – district seat
- Göncruszka (623)
- Hejce (268)
- Hernádbűd (135)
- Hernádcéce (210)
- Hernádszurdok (178)
- Hidasnémeti (1,062)
- Kéked (171)
- Korlát (295)
- Mogyoróska (78)
- Pányok (47)
- Pere (333)
- Regéc (100)
- Sima (25)
- Telkibánya (555)
- Tornyosnémeti (445)
- Vilmány (1,348)
- Vizsoly (786)
- Zsujta (164)

== Demographics ==
Religion in Gönc District (2011 census)
1. Catholic Church (50.9%)
2. Greek Catholicism (6.10%)
3. Calvinism (22.4%)
4. Lutheranism (0.30%)
5. Other religions (0.70%)
6. Non-religious (3.10%)
7. Atheists (0.20%)
8. Undeclared (16.3%)

In 2011, it had a population of 19,275 and the population density was 35/km².

Year	County population	Change
2011	19,275	n/a

=== Ethnicity ===
Besides the Hungarian majority, the main minorities are the Roma (approx. 2,500), Slovak (150) and Rusyn (100).

Total population (2011 census): 19,275
Ethnic groups (2011 census): Identified themselves: 20,542 persons:

- Hungarians: 17,348 (84.45%)
- Gypsies: 2,698 (13.13%)
- Others and indefinable: 496 (2.41%)

Approx. 1,500 persons in Gönc District did declare more than one ethnic group at the 2011 census.

=== Religion ===
Religious adherence in the county according to 2011 census:

- Catholic – 10,988 (Roman Catholic – 9,817; Greek Catholic – 1,171);
- Reformed – 4,325;
- Evangelical – 65;
- other religions – 129;
- Non-religious – 598;
- Atheism – 35;
- Undeclared – 3,135.

== Gallery ==
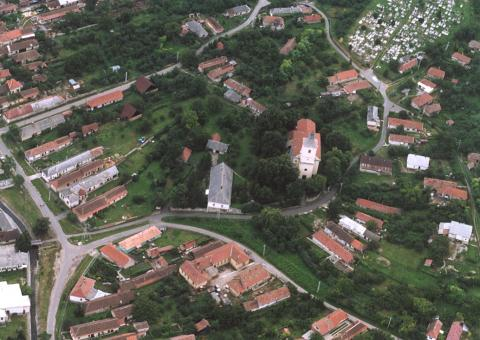
Gönc, the district seat

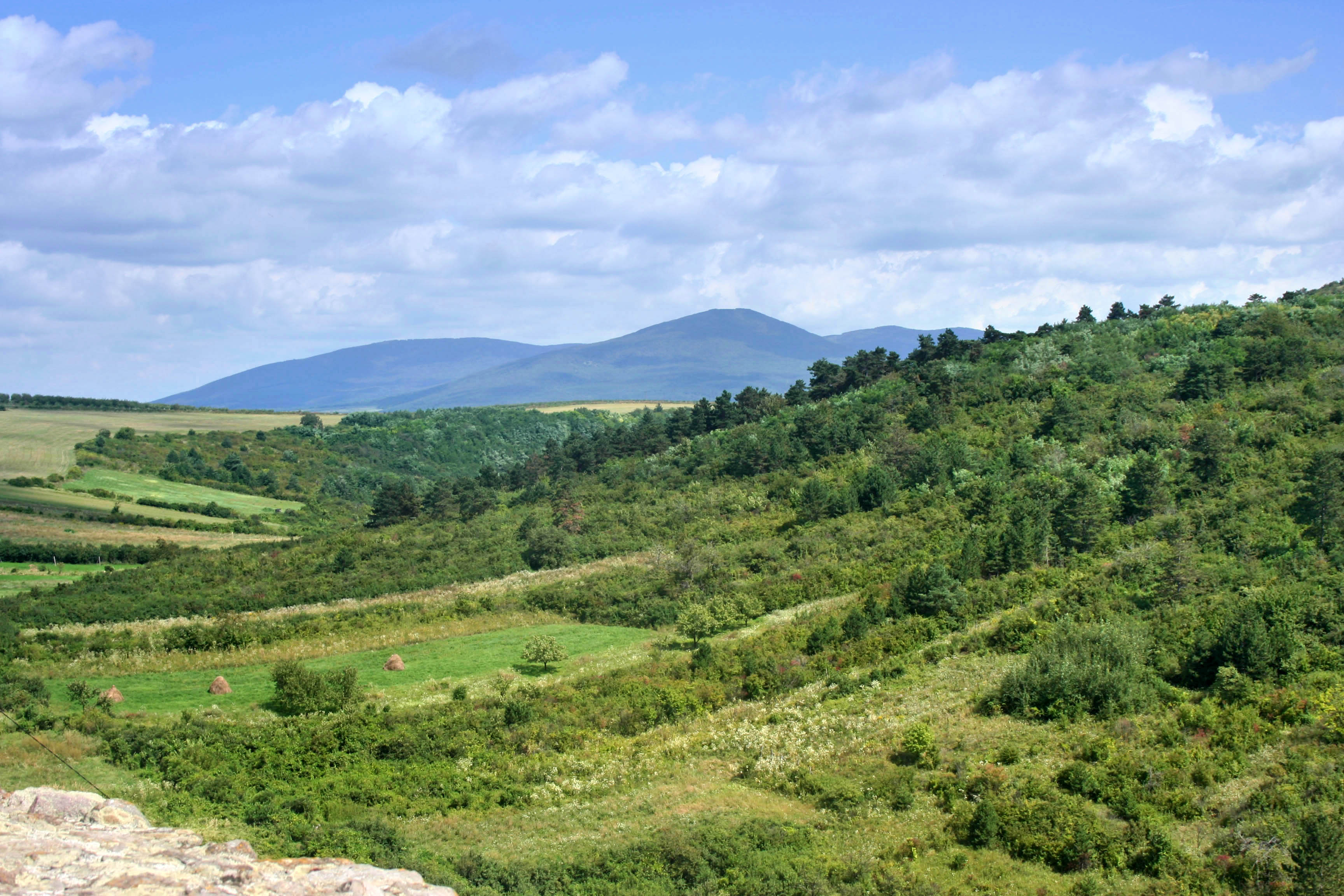
Zemplén mountains from Boldogkőváralja

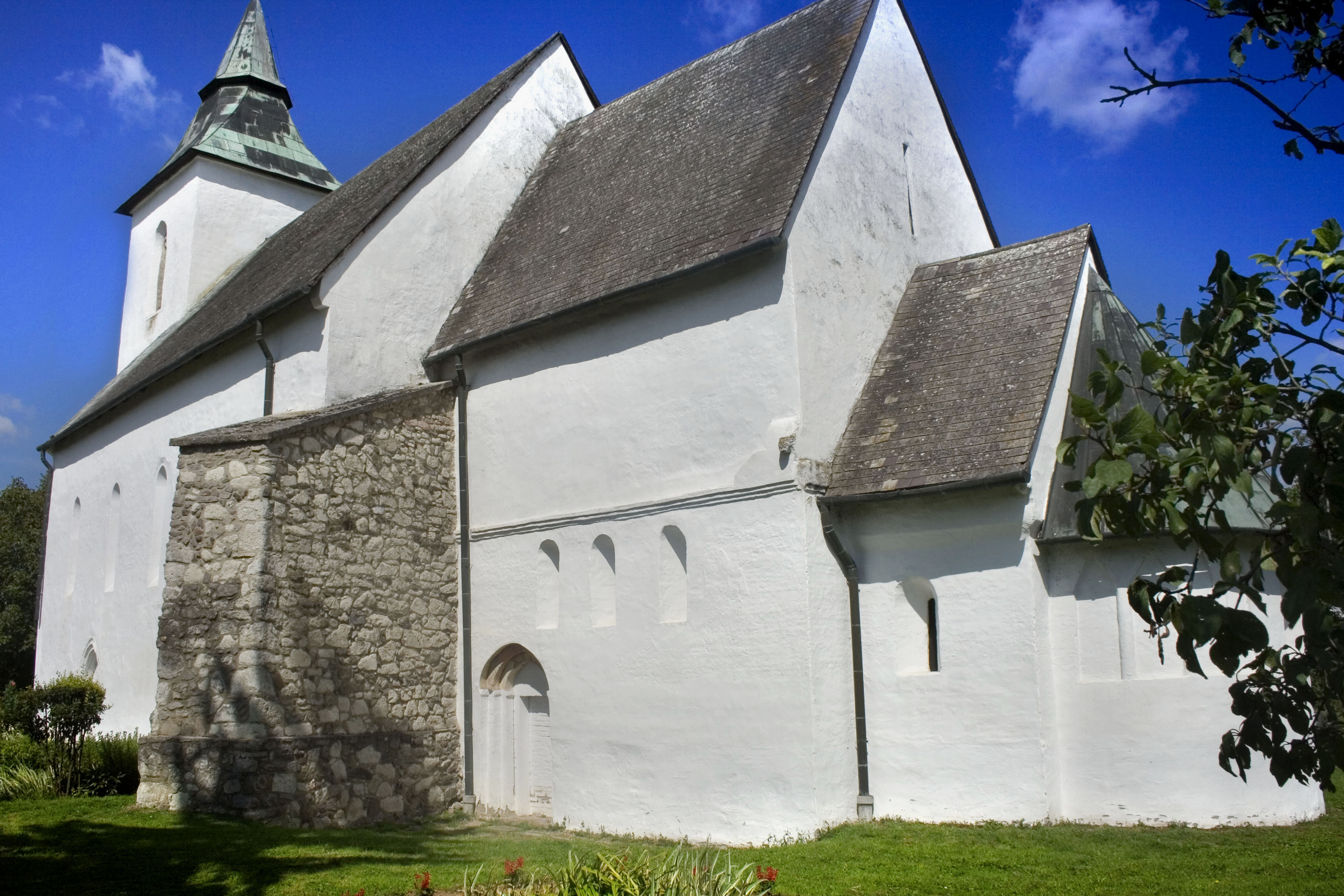
Reformed Romanesque Church in Vizsoly

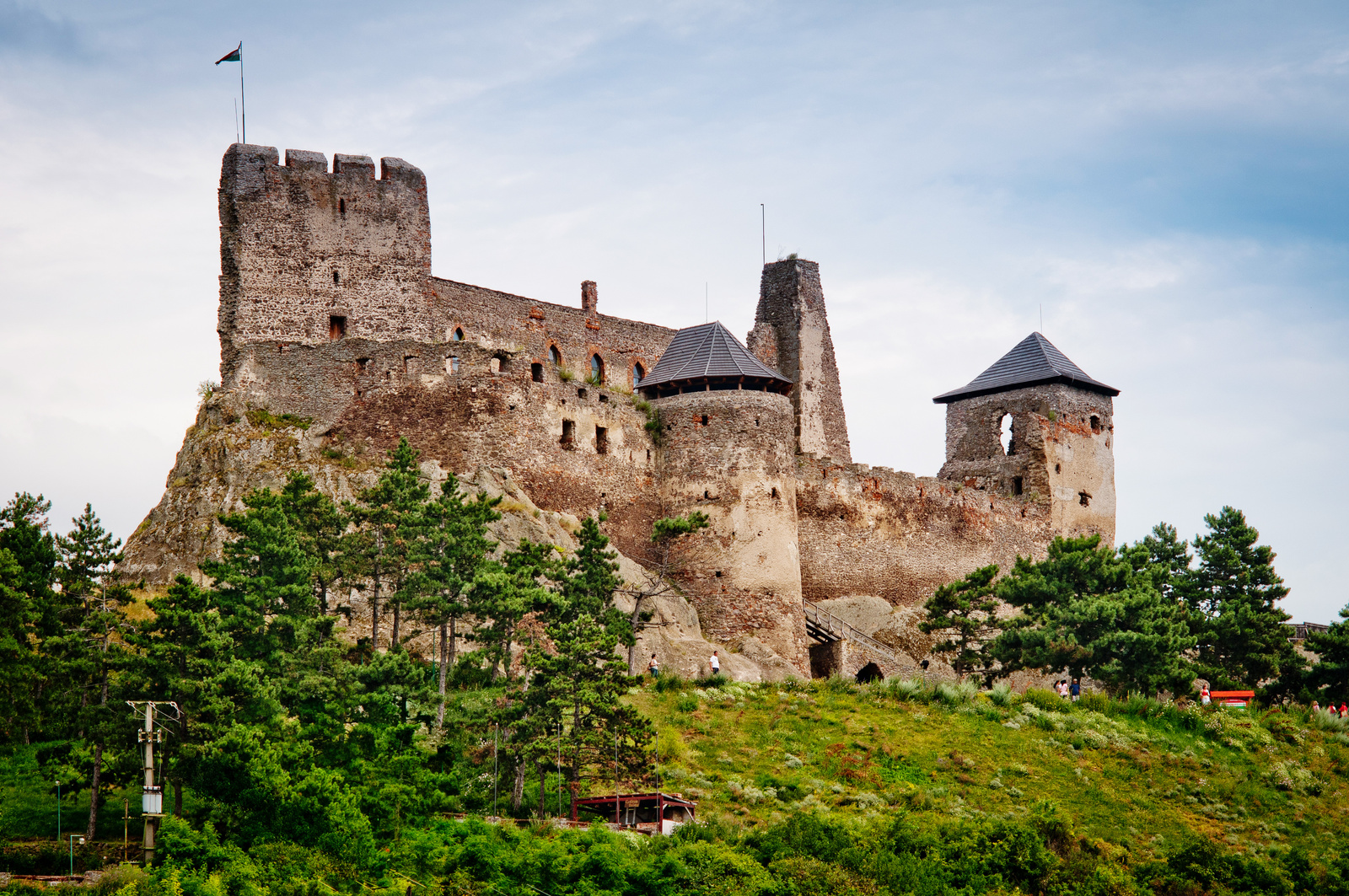
Boldogkő Castle

== See also ==
- List of cities and towns of Hungary
