= Faj =

Faj may refer to:

- Fáj, a village in Hungary
- Faj, Iran, a village in Chaharmahal Province, Iran
- Air Fiji, a defunct Fijian airline
- Diego Jiménez Torres Airport, in Puerto Rico, United States
- Faita language, spoken in Papua New Guinea
- Financial Analysts Journal
