= Paks =

- Town
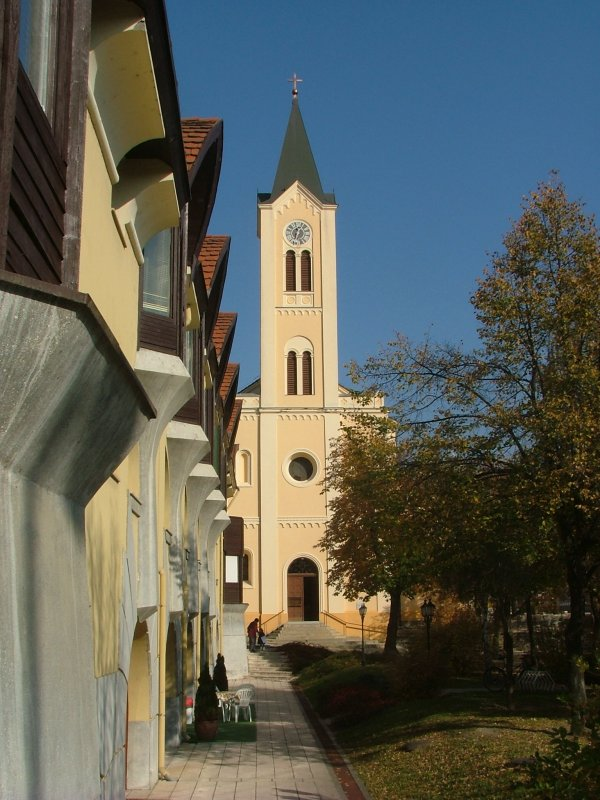
- Sacred Heart Church

- Flag Coat of arms

- Location of Paks
- Coordinates: 46.622047°N 18.855918°E
- Country: Hungary
- County: Tolna
- District: Paks

Government
  - Mayor: Péter Szabó (Fidesz)

Area
  - Total: 154.08 km^{2} (59.49 sq mi)

Population (2009)
  - Total: 19,833
  - Density: 137/km^{2} (350/sq mi)
- Time zone: UTC+1 (CET)
  - Summer (DST): UTC+2 (CEST)
- Postal code: 7030
- Area code: (+36) 75
- Website: paks.hu

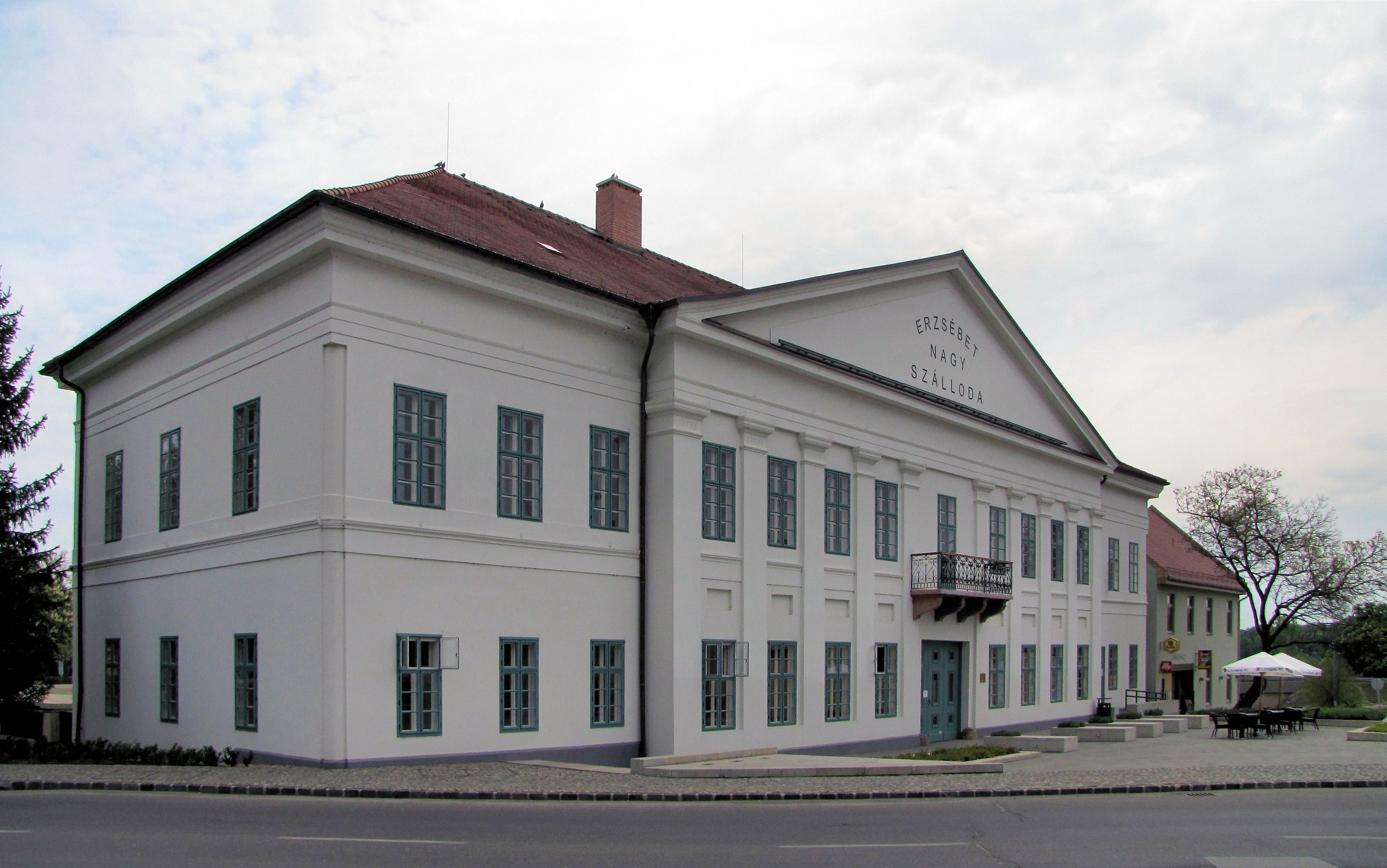
Grand Hotel Erzsébet in Paks, built in 1844

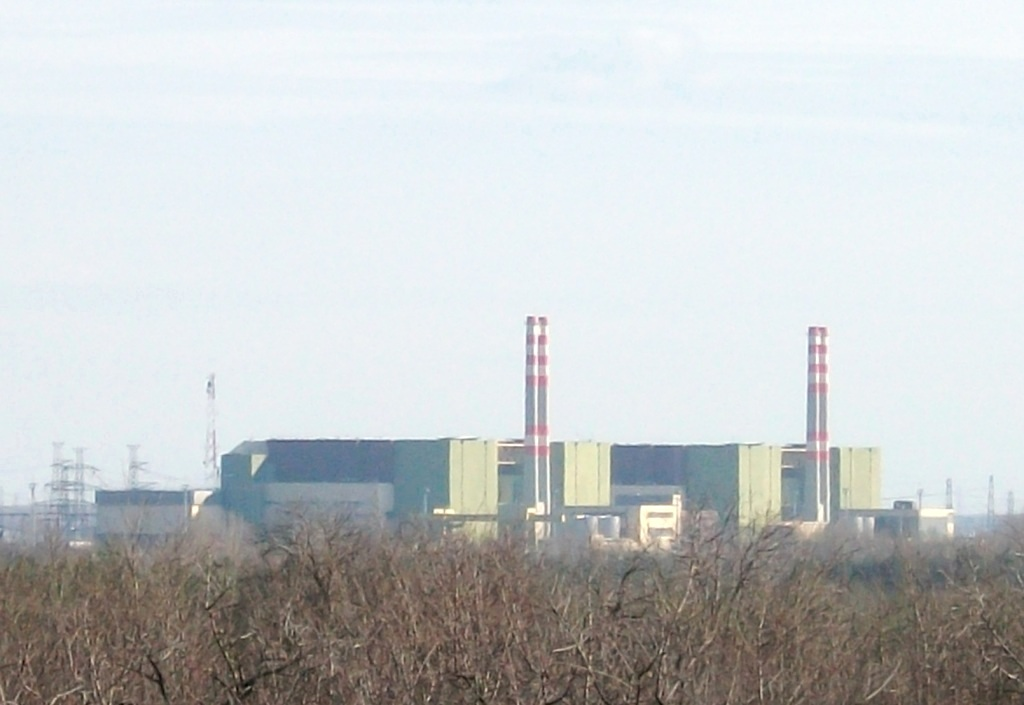
Paks Nuclear Power Plant

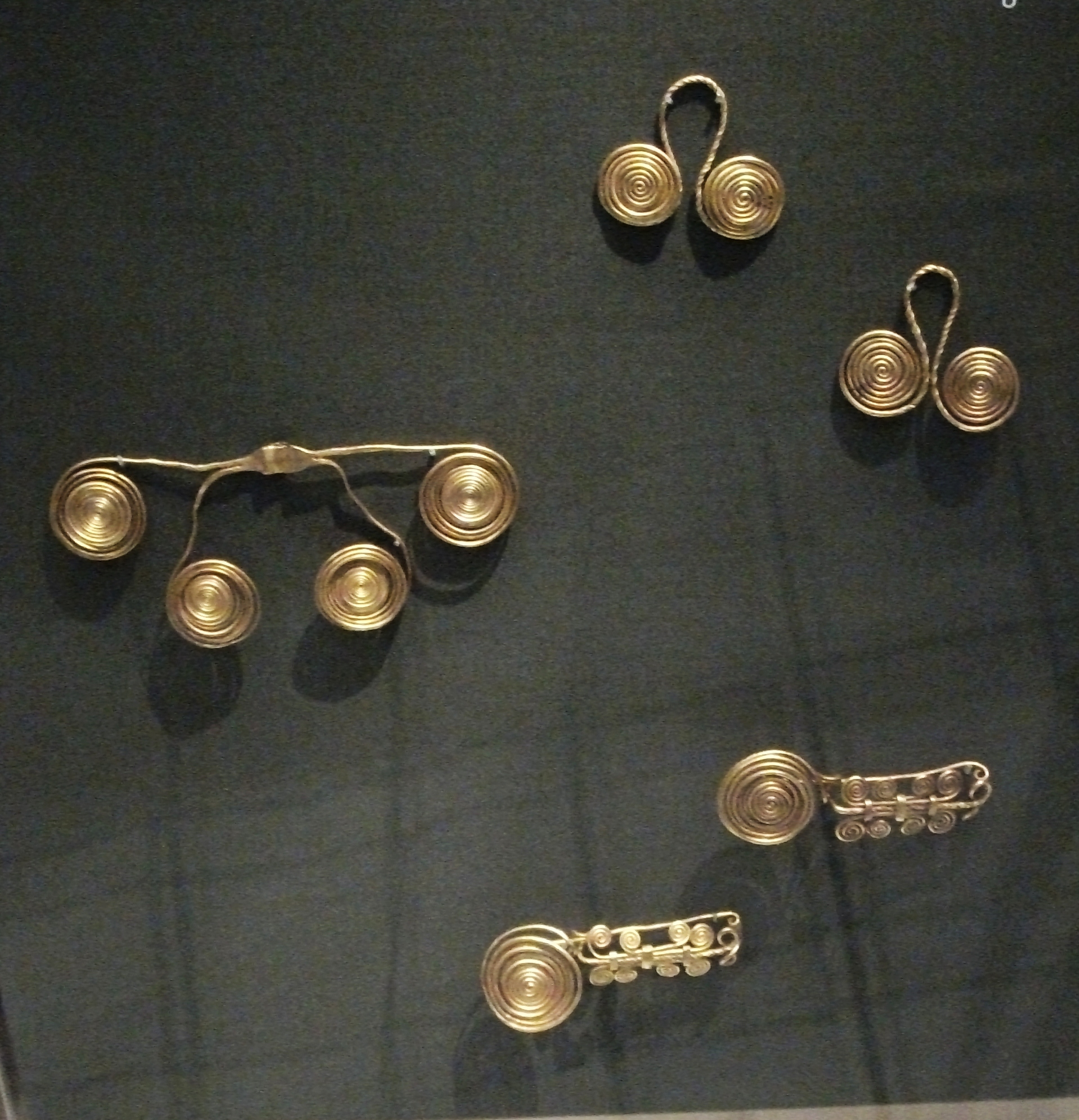
The gold jewellery from the hoard found near Paks (1600-1200 BC)

Paks is a small town in Tolna county, in the south of Hungary, on the right bank of the Danube River, 100 km south of Budapest. Paks as a former agricultural settlement is now the home of the only Hungarian nuclear power plant, which provides about 50% of the country's electricity consumption.

== History ==
The settlement was already inhabited in ancient times. It has played a role in the Ottoman Empire times and during Rákóczi's War of Independence.

The Calvinist and the Lutheran churches were built in 1775 and 1884 respectively.

In the 19th century, several mansions were built in the center of the old town, such as those in Szent István Tér, the main square of the town. The Catholic three-isled, basilica style Sacred Heart church was consecrated in 1901. There is a tablet in the wall of the baroque Szeniczey mansion to commemorate Ferenc Deák, 'the Sage of the Country'. The Town Museum is housed in the former Cseh-Vigyázó mansion.

A Bronze Age gold hoard of jewelry was found between Paks and Dunaföldvár on the right bank of the Danube in the 19th century. The treasure is now in the collections of the British Museum.

The Catholic Holy Spirit church, built according to the design of Imre Makovecz is considered to be an outstanding work of 20th-century architecture. There is a hundred-year-old chestnut alley lining the walkway on the Danube River bank. The town hosts the Spring Festival at Whitsuntide and the International Festival of Blues, Jazz, Rock and Gastronomy.

In the final stages of the Second World War, Soviet troops occupied the town at great cost in the Budapest Offensive. This was followed by four decades of communist rule. Meanwhile, it was famous for its cannery, wine and fish soup.

The Paks Nuclear Power Plant was built in the town in the 1980s, the final decade of Soviet rule within the country.

== Climate ==
Paks's climate is classified as oceanic climate (Köppen Cfb) closely bordering on a humid subtropical climate (Köppen Cfa). The annual average temperature is 11.1 °C (52.0 °F), the hottest month in July is 21.9 °C (71.4 °F), and the coldest month is 0.1 °C (32.2 °F) in January. The annual precipitation is 603.5 millimetres (23.76 in), of which July is the wettest with 68.5 millimetres (2.70 in), while January is the driest with only 33.4 millimetres (1.31 in). The extreme temperature throughout the year ranged from −23.3 °C (−9.9 °F) on 25 December 2001 to 40.6 °C (105.1 °F) on 20 July 2007.

Climate data for Paks, 1991−2020 normals
Month	Jan	Feb	Mar	Apr	May	Jun	Jul	Aug	Sep	Oct	Nov	Dec	Year
Record high °C (°F)	17.4 (63.3)	20.9 (69.6)	24.7 (76.5)	31.7 (89.1)	33.8 (92.8)	36.8 (98.2)	40.6 (105.1)	39.1 (102.4)	36.1 (97.0)	28.8 (83.8)	23.6 (74.5)	18.6 (65.5)	40.6 (105.1)
Mean daily maximum °C (°F)	3.9 (39.0)	6.7 (44.1)	12.2 (54.0)	18.6 (65.5)	23.3 (73.9)	27.0 (80.6)	29.1 (84.4)	29.1 (84.4)	23.3 (73.9)	17.6 (63.7)	10.4 (50.7)	4.2 (39.6)	17.1 (62.8)
Daily mean °C (°F)	0.1 (32.2)	1.7 (35.1)	6.2 (43.2)	11.8 (53.2)	16.4 (61.5)	20.1 (68.2)	21.9 (71.4)	21.5 (70.7)	16.2 (61.2)	10.9 (51.6)	5.8 (42.4)	0.9 (33.6)	11.1 (52.0)
Mean daily minimum °C (°F)	−3.3 (26.1)	−2.6 (27.3)	0.6 (33.1)	4.9 (40.8)	9.7 (49.5)	13.3 (55.9)	14.8 (58.6)	14.4 (57.9)	10.2 (50.4)	5.6 (42.1)	1.8 (35.2)	−2.1 (28.2)	5.6 (42.1)
Record low °C (°F)	−22.7 (−8.9)	−21.5 (−6.7)	−21.4 (−6.5)	−8.8 (16.2)	−2.9 (26.8)	1.6 (34.9)	5.1 (41.2)	5.2 (41.4)	−0.5 (31.1)	−11.0 (12.2)	−16.0 (3.2)	−23.3 (−9.9)	−23.3 (−9.9)
Average precipitation mm (inches)	33.4 (1.31)	38.3 (1.51)	32.2 (1.27)	36.7 (1.44)	59.4 (2.34)	64.9 (2.56)	68.5 (2.70)	58.3 (2.30)	61.6 (2.43)	52.2 (2.06)	50.8 (2.00)	47.2 (1.86)	603.5 (23.76)
Average precipitation days (≥ 1.0 mm)	6.1	6.9	5.8	6.5	8.7	7.7	6.9	6.3	6.7	6.6	7.6	7.7	83.5
Average relative humidity (%)	82.7	76.7	67.7	62.5	66.2	67.3	65.5	66.7	72.8	78.2	83.7	85.2	72.9
Source: NOAA

== Sport ==
Paksi FC and Atomerőmű SE, a football club and basketball club, respectively are based in Paks.

== Twin towns – sister cities ==
Paks is twinned with:

- Galanta, Slovakia
- Gornji Vakuf-Uskoplje, Bosnia and Herzegovina
- Loviisa, Finland
- Novovoronezh, Russia
- Reichertshofen, Germany
- Târgu Secuiesc Romania
- Vyshkovo, Ukraine

== See also ==
- Forró for another Bronze Age hoard from Hungary
- Zsujta for a Bronze Age hoard from northern Hungary
