= Dunaföldvár =

- Town
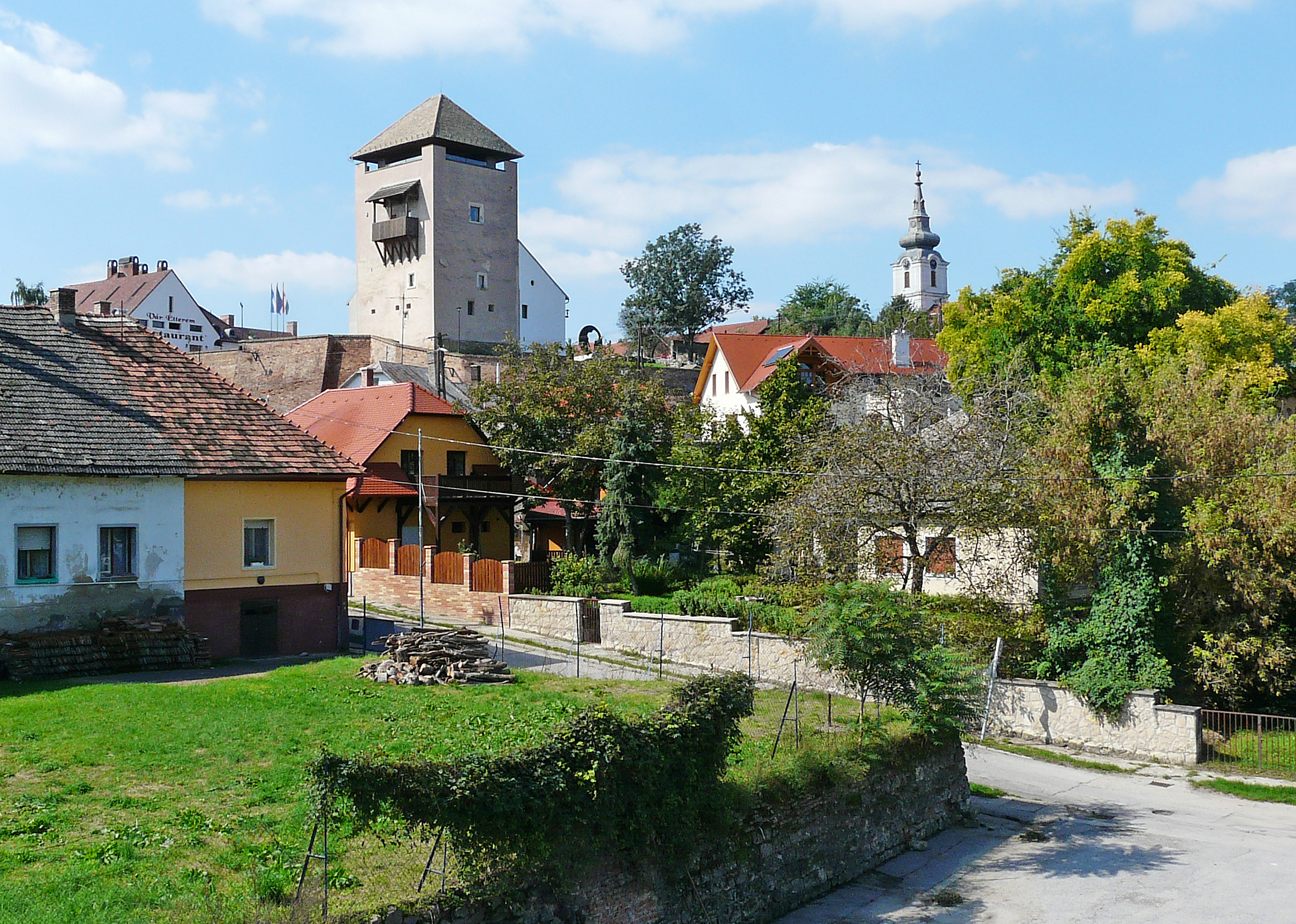
- View of the town from its bridge

- Flag Coat of arms

- Location of Dunaföldvár
- Coordinates: 46.80889°N 18.91797°E
- Country: Hungary
- County: Tolna

Area
  - Total: 111.42 km^{2} (43.02 sq mi)

Population (2004)
  - Total: 9,320
  - Density: 83.64/km^{2} (216.6/sq mi)
- Time zone: UTC+1 (CET)
  - Summer (DST): UTC+2 (CEST)
- Postal code: 7020
- Area code: 75

Dunaföldvár is a town in Tolna County, Hungary. Its residents are Hungarians, with minority of Serbs.

== History ==
A Bronze Age gold hoard of jewellery was found between Paks and Dunaföldvár on the banks of the Danube in the nineteenth century. The treasure is now in the collections of the British Museum.

Dunaföldvár was an important settlement at the time of the Hungarian conquest, and experienced its golden age during the 14th and 15th centuries.

It was first mentioned in the work of the Turkish chronicler Sinan Chaus, who described the history of the 1543 expedition. However, the castle was destroyed in the autumn of 1686 after it was set ablaze by Turkish troops.

In 1703, the legendary Kuruc general, General János Bottyán, occupied the castle, which became famous as the bridgehead of the Transdanubian campaign. The castle was restored at the beginning of the 19th century, and in 1974 restoration was concluded on the building according to the plans of Ferenc Mendele.

== Sightseeing ==
Besides the castle, the city also boasts numerous churches and chapels. One of the most famous churches, the St. Ilona’s Roman Catholic parish was built in 1725 in Baroque style. Its tower is 37 meters high and 9.6 meters wide. In 1757 it was struck by lightning, burned down, and 100 years later, in 1858, it became the victim of another devastating fire. It was severely damaged in 1944, but the temple survived, and remains one of the gems of the city.

Visitors can also visit the Joseph-Danube Bridge which connects the Transdanubia region to the Great Plain. After two years of construction, the bridge was opened in November, 1930. The Germans bombed the bridge during World War II and it was rebuilt after the war under the supervision of engineer Gustav Faber.

== Demographics ==
As of the 2022 census, the town is 88.8% Hungarian, 1.1% Romani. 31.6% of its inhabitants are Roman Catholic, 5.4% are Reformed, 1.4% Lutheran, and 16% nondenominational.

== Twin towns — sister cities ==
Dunaföldvár is twinned with:

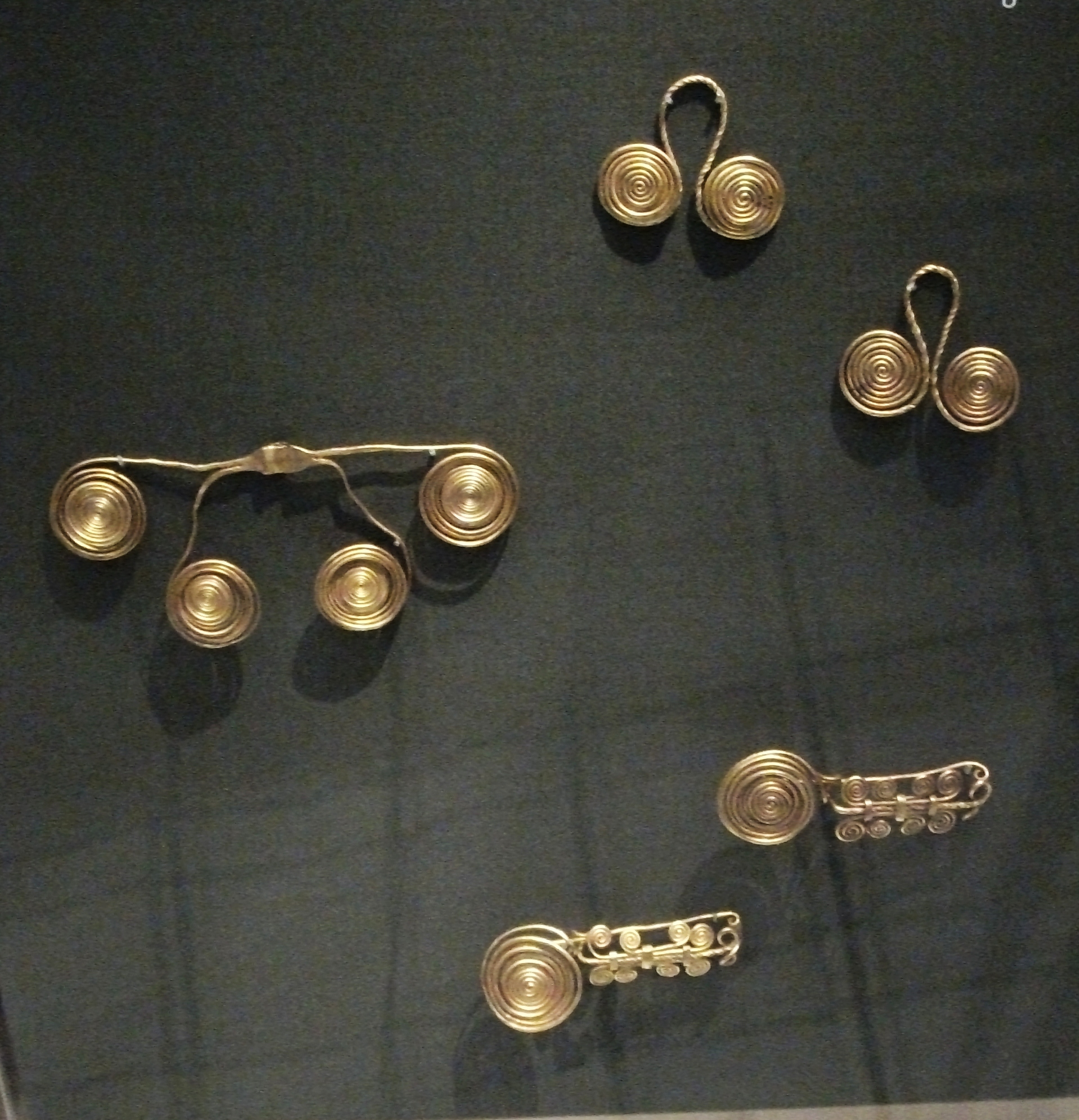
The gold jewellery from the hoard found near Dunaföldvár (1600-1200

- Weikersheim, Germany
- Ossona, Italy

== Notable people ==
- Piroska Oszoli (1919-2017) painter, The Lover of Danube

== See also ==
- Forró for another Bronze Age hoard from Hungary
- Zsujta for another Bronze Age hoard from northern Hungary
