= Hernádszentandrás =

- Village
- Flag Coat of arms

- Location of Hernádszentandrás
- Coordinates: 48.28886°N 21.09617°E
- Country: Hungary
- Region: Northern Hungary
- County: Borsod-Abaúj-Zemplén
- District: Encs

Government
  - mayor: Gábor Üveges

Area
  - Total: 7.04 km^{2} (2.72 sq mi)

Population (1 January 2025)
  - Total: 494
  - Density: 70.2/km^{2} (182/sq mi)
- Time zone: UTC+1 (CET)
  - Summer (DST): UTC+2 (CEST)
- Postal code: 3852
- Area code: (+36) 46
- Website: www.hernadszentandras.hu

Hernádszentandrás is a village in Borsod-Abaúj-Zemplén County in northeastern Hungary.
