= Hernádcéce =

- Village
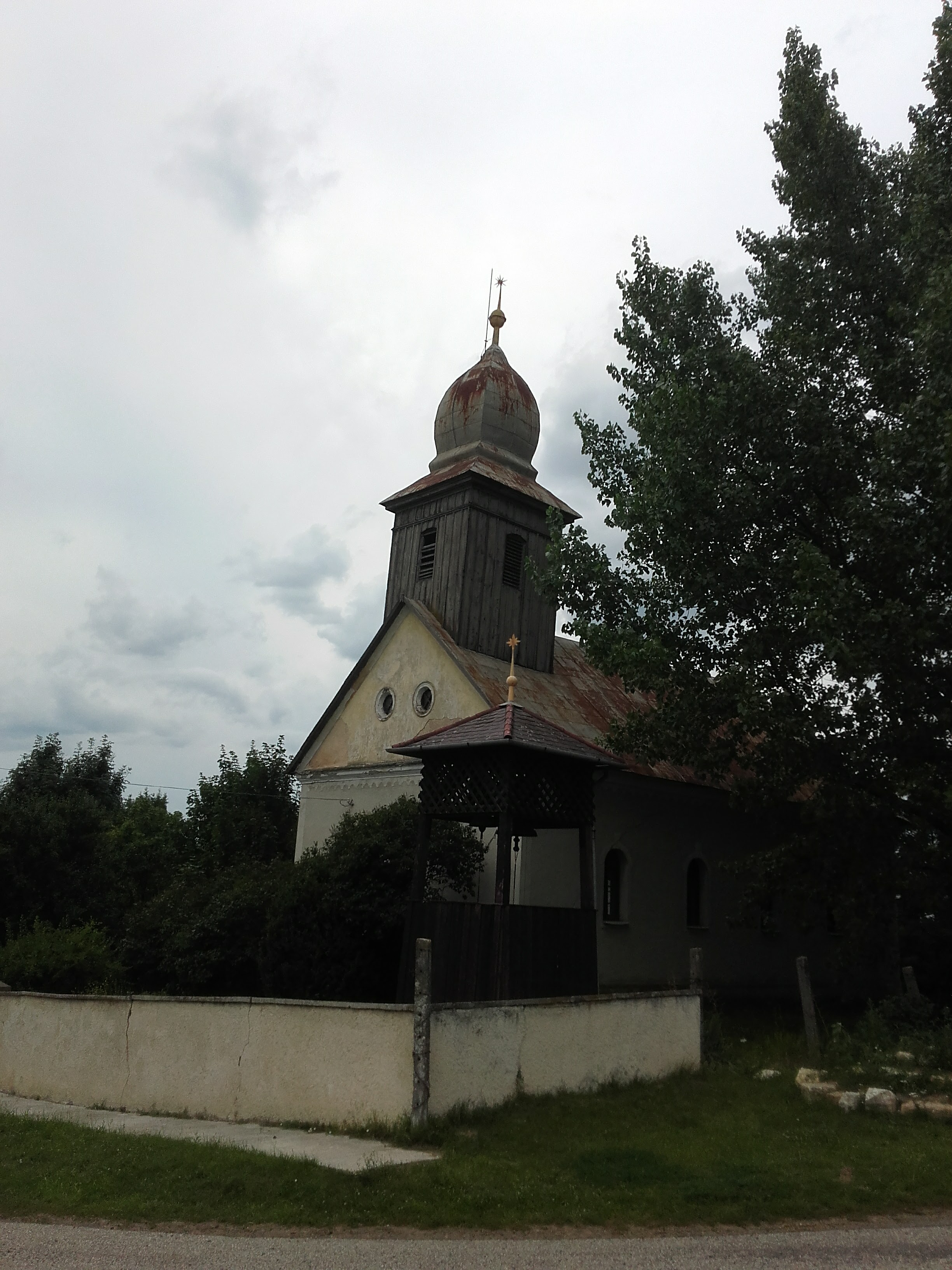

- Flag Coat of arms

- Location of Hernádcéce
- Coordinates: 48.35761°N 21.19696°E
- Country: Hungary
- Region: Northern Hungary
- County: Borsod-Abaúj-Zemplén
- District: Gönc

Area
  - Total: 9.91 km^{2} (3.83 sq mi)

Population (1 January 2025)
  - Total: 250
  - Density: 25/km^{2} (65/sq mi)
- Time zone: UTC+1 (CET)
  - Summer (DST): UTC+2 (CEST)
- Postal code: 3887
- Area code: (+36) 46
- Website: hernadcece.hu

Hernádcéce is a village in Borsod-Abaúj-Zemplén County in northeastern Hungary. Hernádcéce and its surroundings had already been inhabited into the Stone Age.
