= Krasznokvajda =

- Village
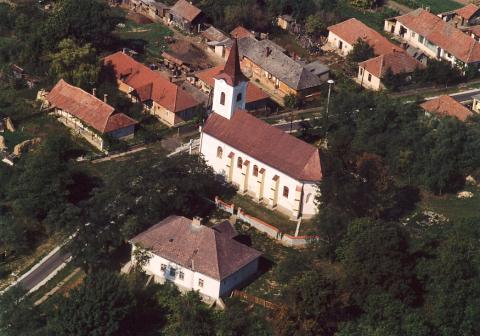
- Krasznokvajda from above

- Flag Coat of arms

- Location of Krasznokvajda
- Coordinates: 48.47295°N 20.97236°E
- Country: Hungary
- Region: Northern Hungary
- County: Borsod-Abaúj-Zemplén
- District: Encs

Area
  - Total: 11.44 km^{2} (4.42 sq mi)

Population (1 January 2026)
  - Total: 423
  - Density: 37.0/km^{2} (95.8/sq mi)
- Time zone: UTC+1 (CET)
  - Summer (DST): UTC+2 (CEST)
- Postal code: 3821
- Area code: (+36) 46
- Website: www.krasznokvajda.hu

Krasznokvajda is a village in Borsod-Abaúj-Zemplén county, Hungary. Ancestral home of the Szentimrey family.
