= Csobád =

- Village
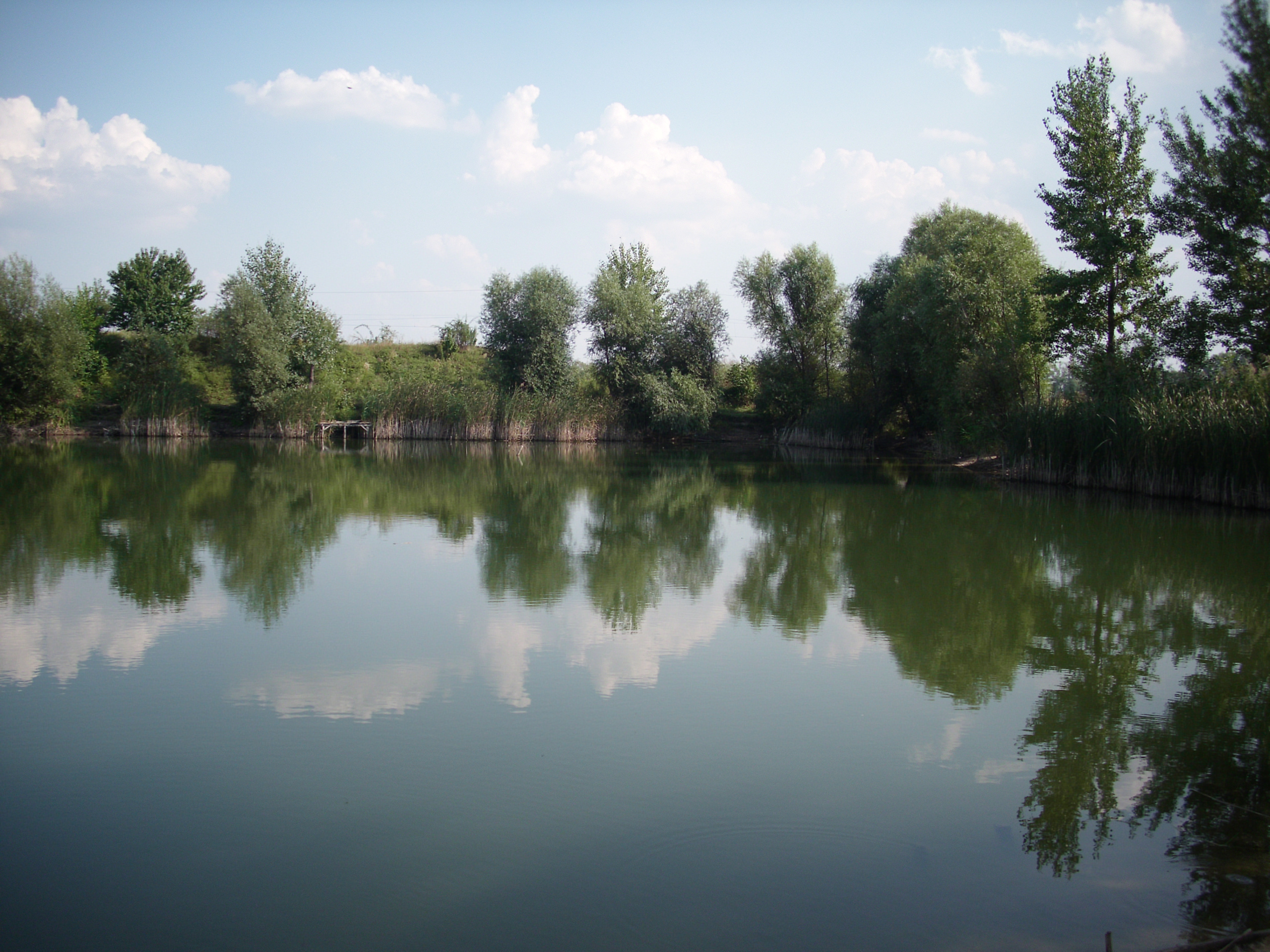

- Flag Coat of arms

- Location of Csobád
- Coordinates: 48.28051°N 21.02597°E
- Country: Hungary
- Region: Northern Hungary
- County: Borsod-Abaúj-Zemplén
- District: Encs

Area
  - Total: 11.83 km^{2} (4.57 sq mi)

Population (1 January 2025)
  - Total: 683
  - Density: 57.7/km^{2} (150/sq mi)
- Time zone: UTC+1 (CET)
  - Summer (DST): UTC+2 (CEST)
- Postal code: 3848
- Area code: (+36) 46

Csobád is a village in Borsod-Abaúj-Zemplén County in northeastern Hungary. As of 2008, the village had a population of 679.
