= Zsujta =

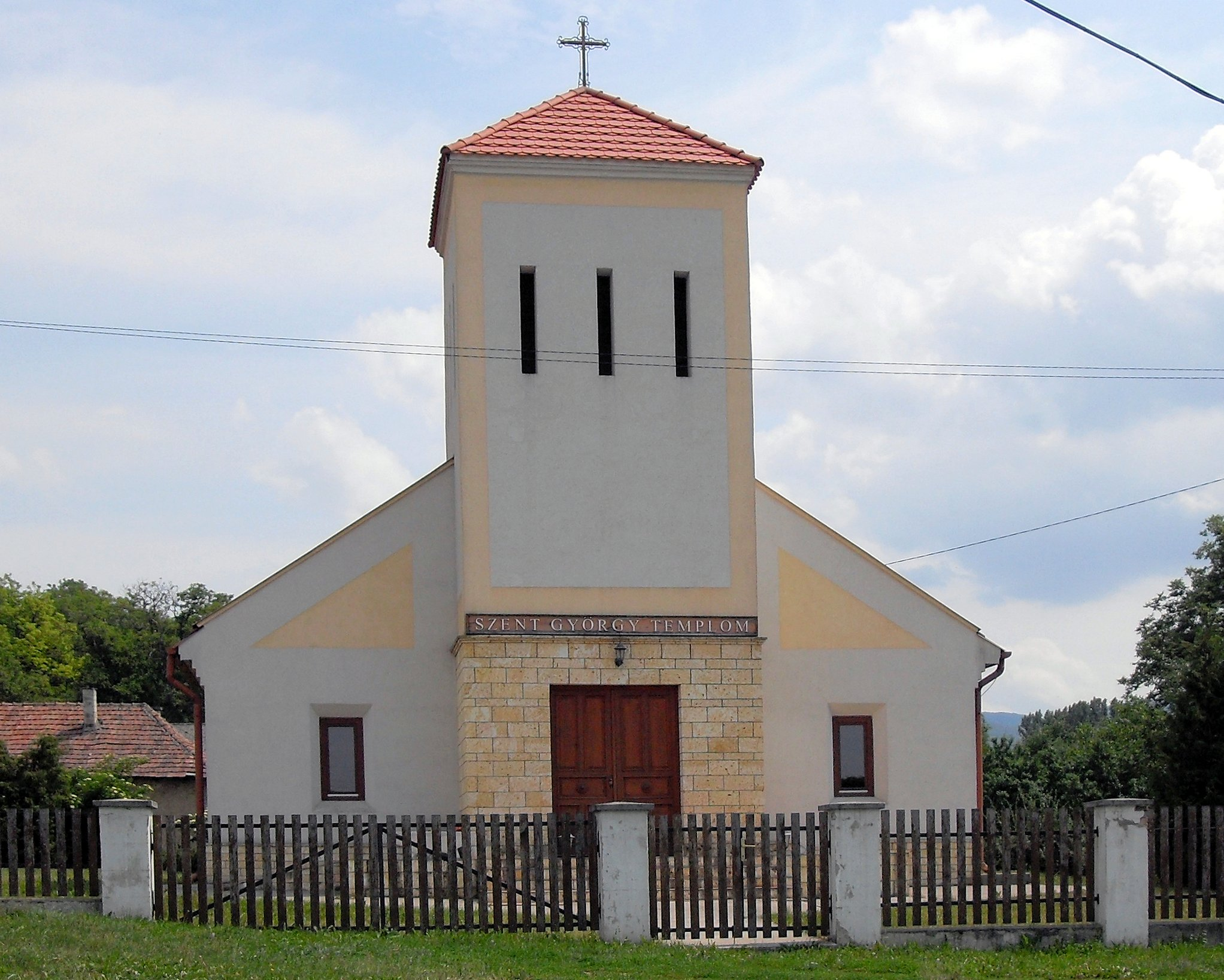

- Location of Borsod-Abaúj-Zemplén county in Hungary

- Location of Zsujta
- Coordinates: 48.50012°N 21.27940°E
- Country: Hungary
- County: Borsod-Abaúj-Zemplén

Area
  - Total: 6.73 km^{2} (2.60 sq mi)

Population (2004)
  - Total: 203
  - Density: 30.16/km^{2} (78.1/sq mi)
- Time zone: UTC+1 (CET)
  - Summer (DST): UTC+2 (CEST)
- Postal code: 3897
- Area code: 46

Zsujta is a village in Borsod-Abaúj-Zemplén county, Hungary. A large Bronze Age hoard of weapons and cart fittings (one in the shape of a duck), was discovered at the village in the late 19th century. The hoard is now in the collections of the British Museum, London.

== History ==
Zsujta is a small border settlement in the Hernád Valley. The area of the village and its surroundings has been inhabited since ancient times, as evidenced by the rich and valuable Bronze Age findings discovered in the 1800s, now located in the British Museum.

The first mention of our Árpád-era settlement is found in a document dated 1219, in the Váradi Regestrum charter, under the name Sucta. According to the charter, a man named Reynold from Zsujta accused the son of a Gönc resident of murder. In 1295, the village was referred to as Sugta or Sugtha, and in the early 14th century, it was recorded as Sugkta.

In the early 14th century, it was noted as the village of János, the castle captain of Gönc, and during this time, according to a surviving document, it was destroyed by Edus Bárcai, a servient of Copoz.

It was a royal estate until 1262 when King V. István, as a young king, granted it to Aladár, the queen's steward. In 1402, it became part of the Perényi family through classification. Like most Perényi estates, the population became Protestant during the Reformation. In exchange for his freedom, Perényi János, who was captured during the Hussite captivity, gave the Nagyida Castle with its associated villages, including Zsujta, to Giskra in 1441.

In financial difficulties, the Hussite leader sold Zsujta to a wealthy citizen of Körmöc. During the Ottoman era, the settlement was almost completely depopulated and only slowly resettled. After 1560, several families acquired land in Zsujta, including the Karsa, Puky, and Zsujtai families. In 1696, it became a curial place with uninhabited serf portions. By 1715, there were already 5 Hungarian serfs living in the village. In 1726, one family proved its nobility. Besides the Zsujtai family, the Balogh, Berényi, and Kornis families were the landowners. The population was predominantly Hungarian in the second half of the 19th century, with 573 inhabitants in 1851 and 529 in 1920.

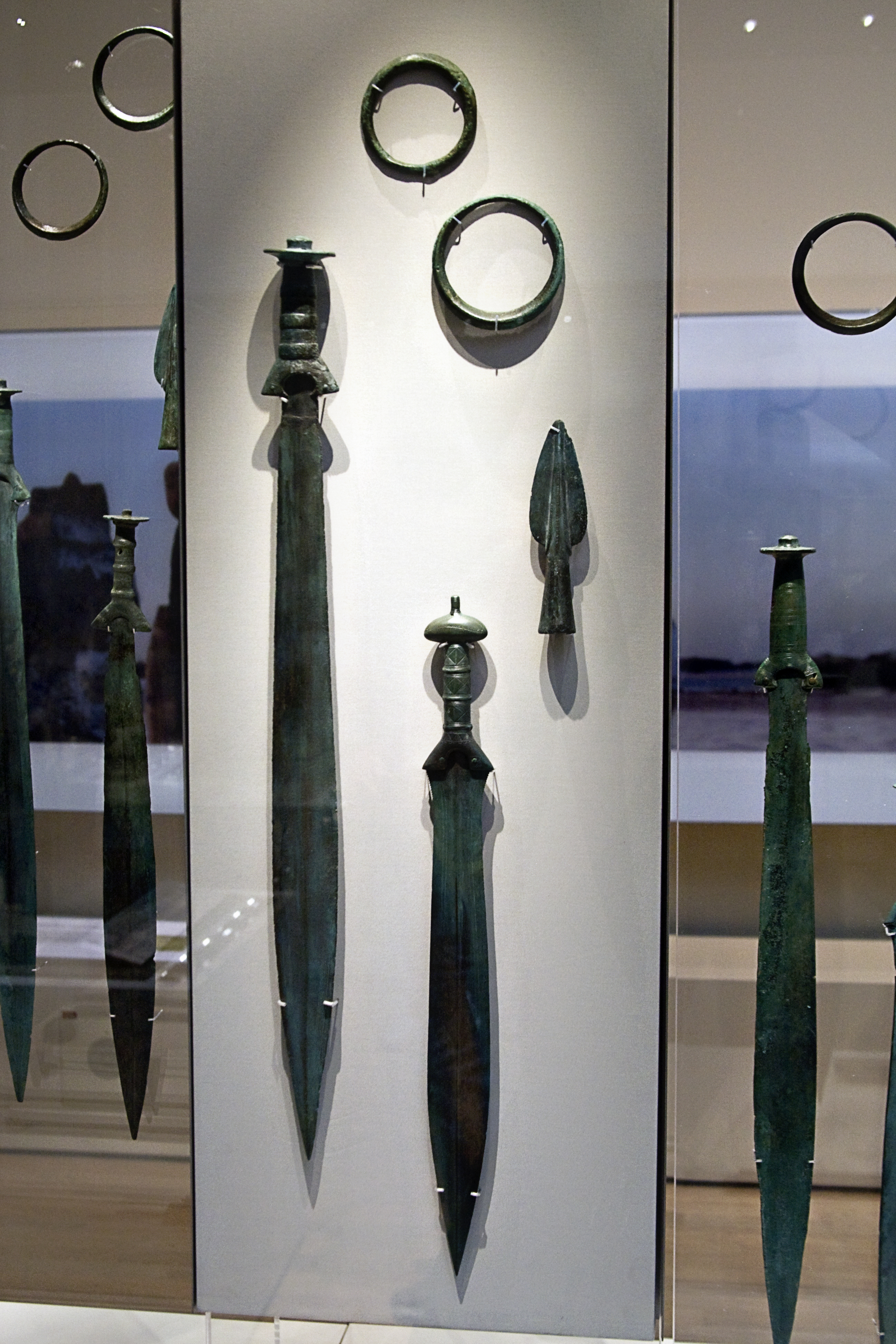
The Zsujta hoard on display in the British Museum (1200-1050 BC).

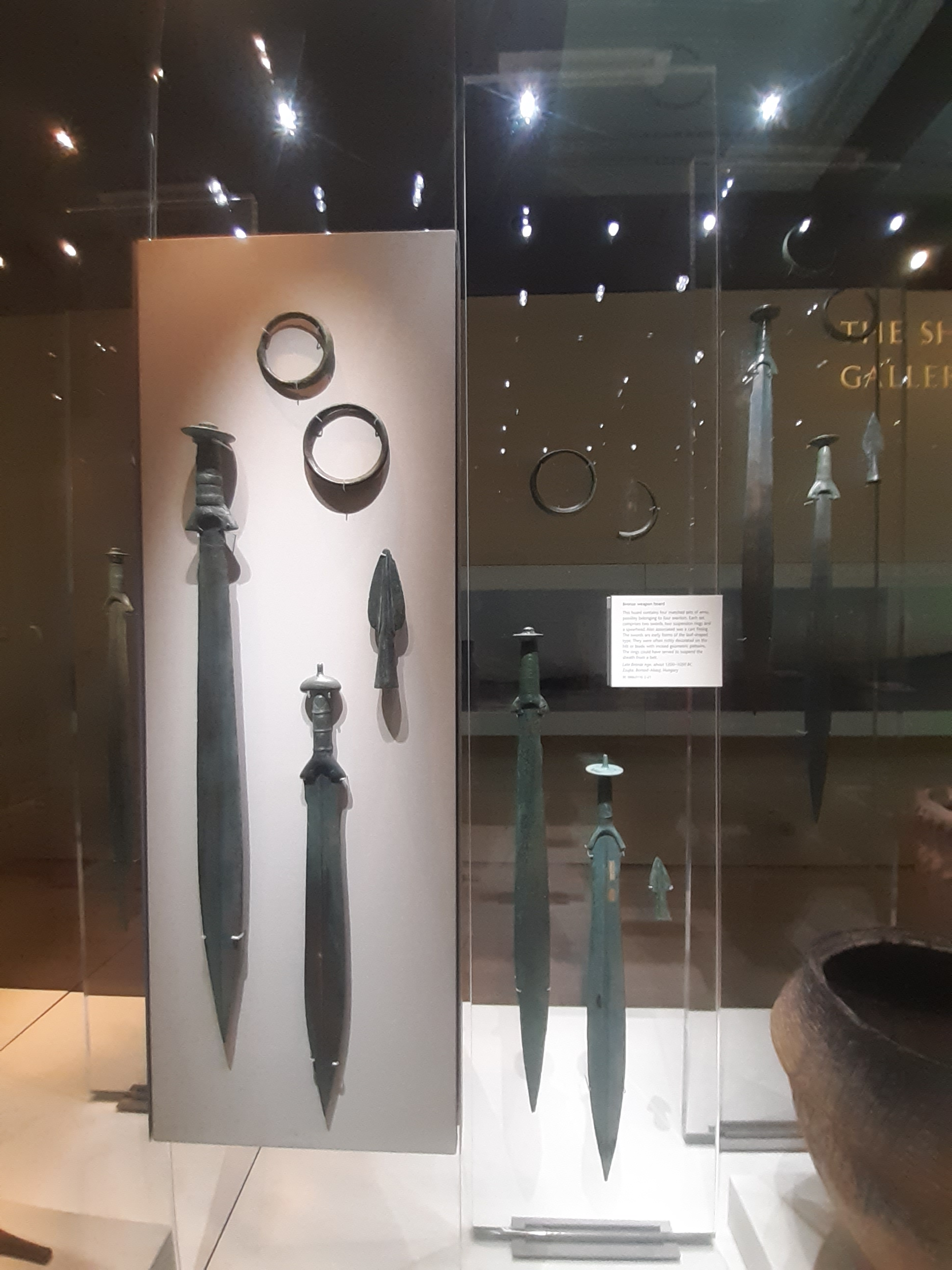
Image of the entire hoard in the British Museum.

In the 18th century, the village was inhabited by lesser nobles, as evidenced by several beautiful manors. One of the most beautiful buildings was constructed in 1883 by Dr. István Nagymáthé, a public and exchange lawyer, for his family.

At the beginning of the 20th century, it belonged to the Füzér district of Abaúj-Torna County.

In the 1910 census, the village had 479 inhabitants, including 471 Hungarians and 5 Slovaks. Among them, 236 were Roman Catholic, 173 were Reformed, and 52 were Jewish.

During the World War II, the Jews of Zsujta were gathered in Kassa and deported from there.

== See also ==
- Forró for another Bronze Age hoard from northern Hungary
- Paks-Dunaföldvár gold hoard from the Bronze Age
