= Fulókércs =

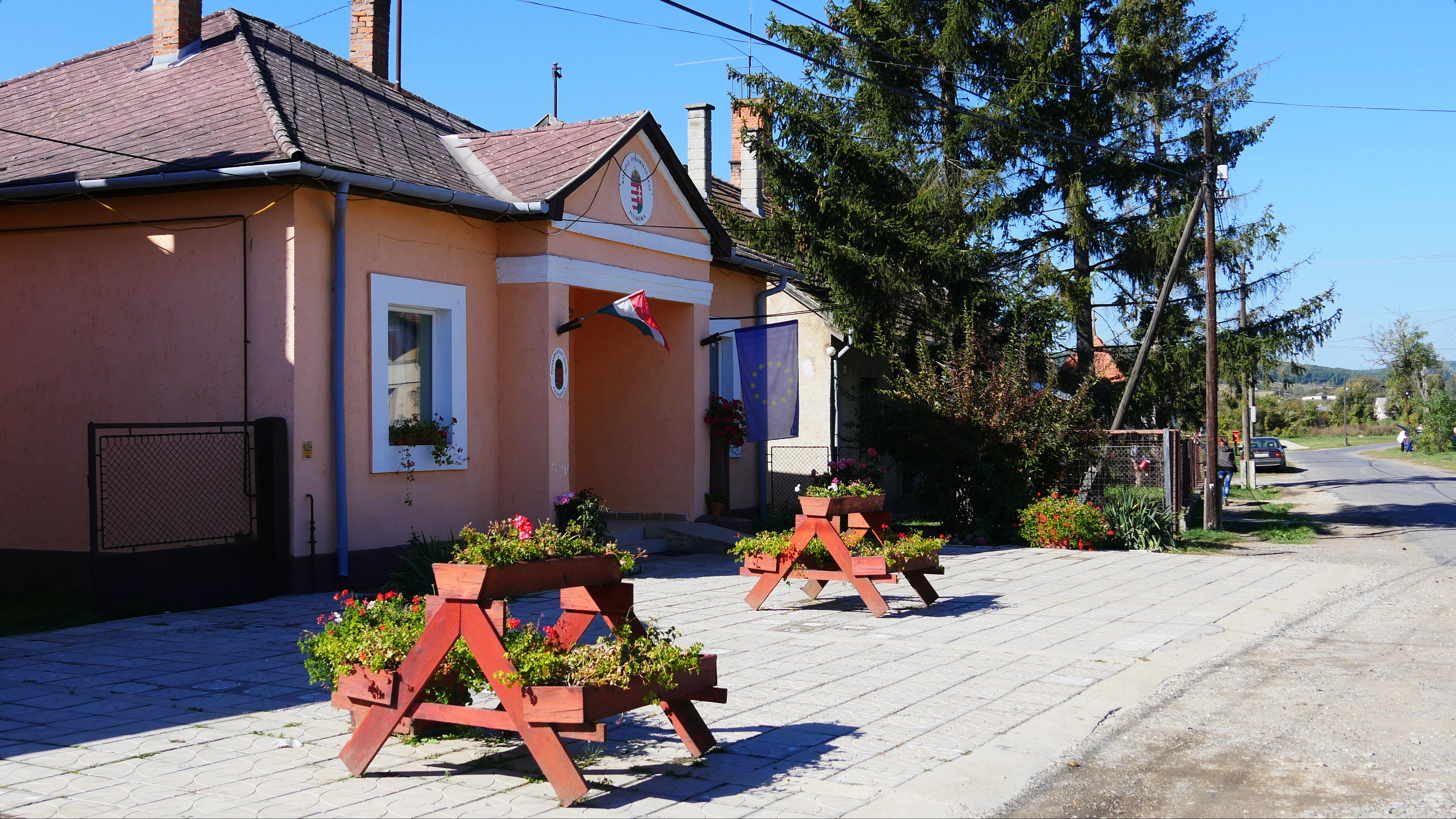
- Village hall

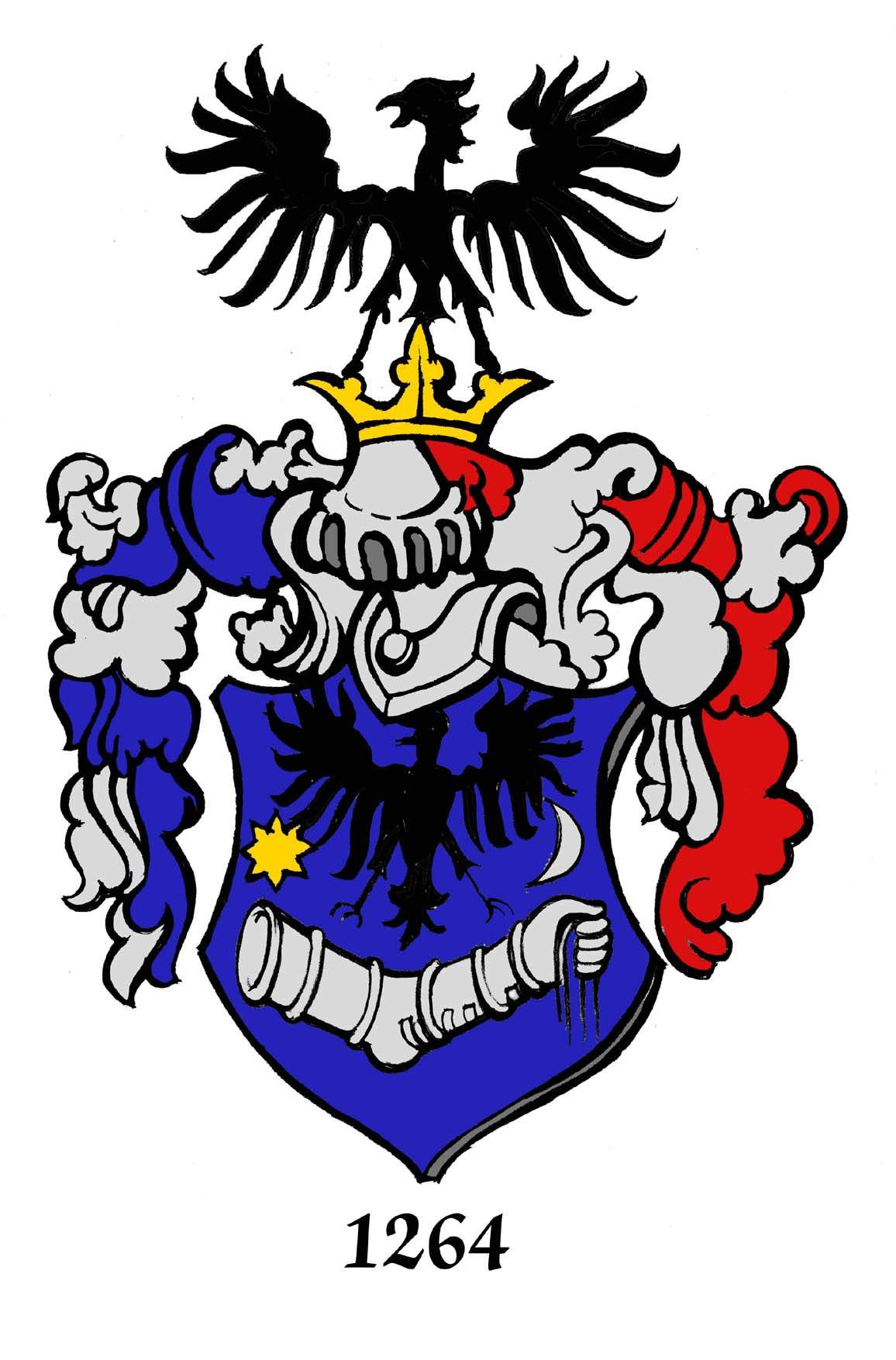
- Coat of arms

- Location of Fulókércs in Hungary
- Coordinates: 48°25′47.89″N 21°6′23.94″E
- Country: Hungary
- Region: Northern Hungary
- County: Borsod-Abaúj-Zemplén
- Subregion: Encs
- Rank: Village

Area
  - Total: 18.63 km^{2} (7.19 sq mi)

Population (2009)
  - Total: 387
  - Density: 20.8/km^{2} (53.8/sq mi)
- Time zone: UTC+1 (CET)
  - Summer (DST): UTC+2 (CEST)
- Postal code: 3864
- Area code: +36 46
- KSH code: 22123
- Website: https://fulokercs.hu/

Fulókércs is a village in Borsod-Abaúj-Zemplén County in northeastern Hungary. As of 2008 it had a population of 393; in 2009 it was 387.
