= Abaújkér =

- Village
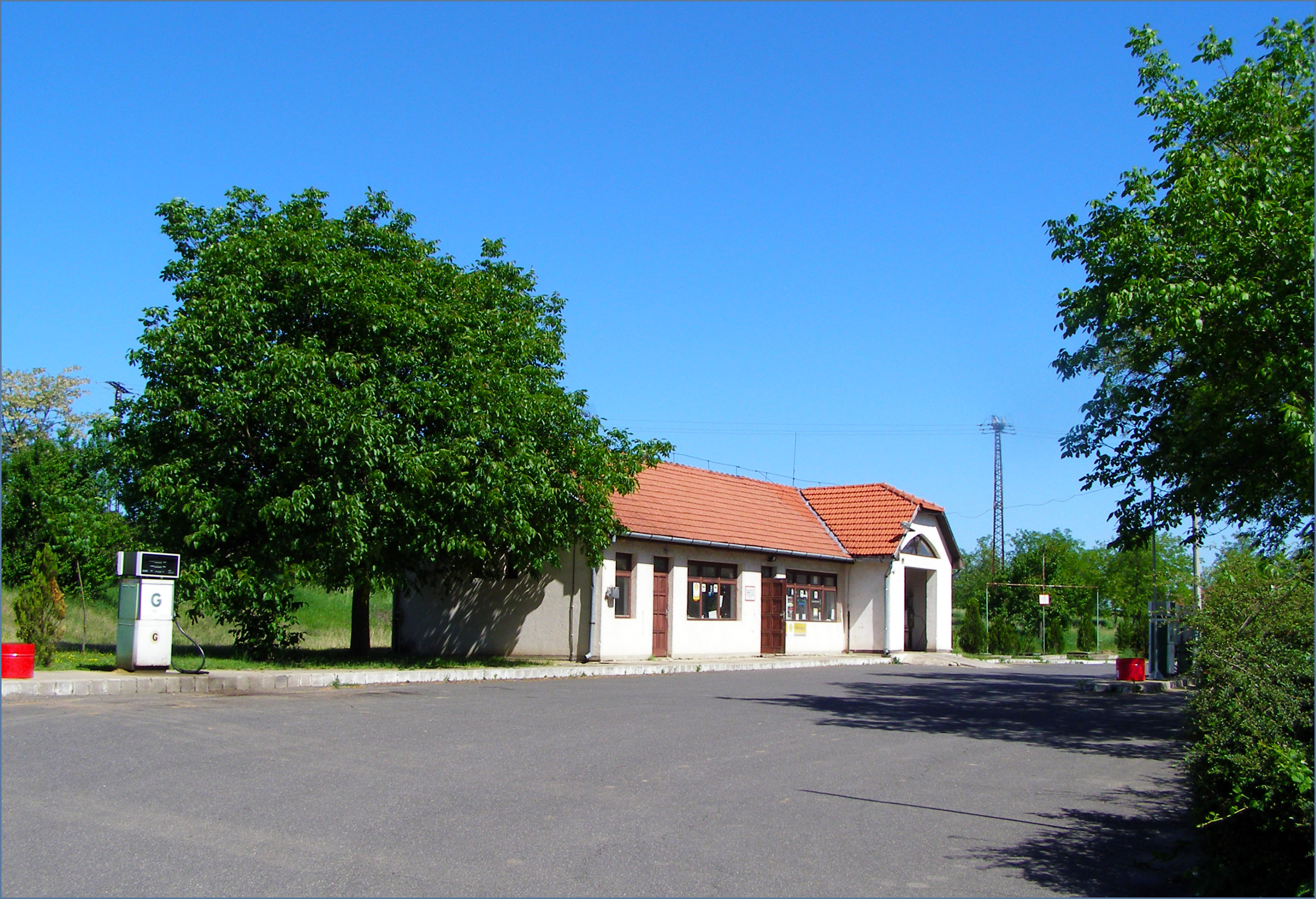

- Flag Coat of arms

- Location of Abaújkér
- Coordinates: 48.30391°N 21.20061°E
- Country: Hungary
- Region: Northern Hungary
- County: Borsod-Abaúj-Zemplén
- District: Gönc

Area
  - Total: 17.28 km^{2} (6.67 sq mi)

Population (1 January 2026)
  - Total: 516
  - Density: 29.9/km^{2} (77.3/sq mi)
- Time zone: UTC+1 (CET)
  - Summer (DST): UTC+2 (CEST)
- Postal code: 3882
- Area code: (+36) 47
- Website: www.abaujker.hu

Abaújkér is a village in Borsod-Abaúj-Zemplén county, Hungary.

Jews lived in Abaújkér for many years until they were murdered in the Holocaust.
