= Faj, Iran =

Faj فاج
- village
- Location within Iran
- Coordinates: 31°11′39″N 51°02′59″E
- Country: Iran
- Province: Chaharmahal and Bakhtiari
- County: Lordegan
- Bakhsh: Central
- Rural District: Sardasht

Population (2006)
  - Total: 56
- Time zone: UTC+3:30 (IRST)
  - Summer (DST): UTC+4:30 (IRDT)
- ISO 3166 code: IRN

Faj (Persian: فاج, also Romanized as Fāj) is a village in Sardasht Rural District, in the Central District of Lordegan County, Chaharmahal and Bakhtiari Province, Iran. At the 2006 census, its population was 56, in 10 families. The village is populated by Lurs.
