= Ináncs =

Coordinates: 48°17′N 21°04′E

- Village
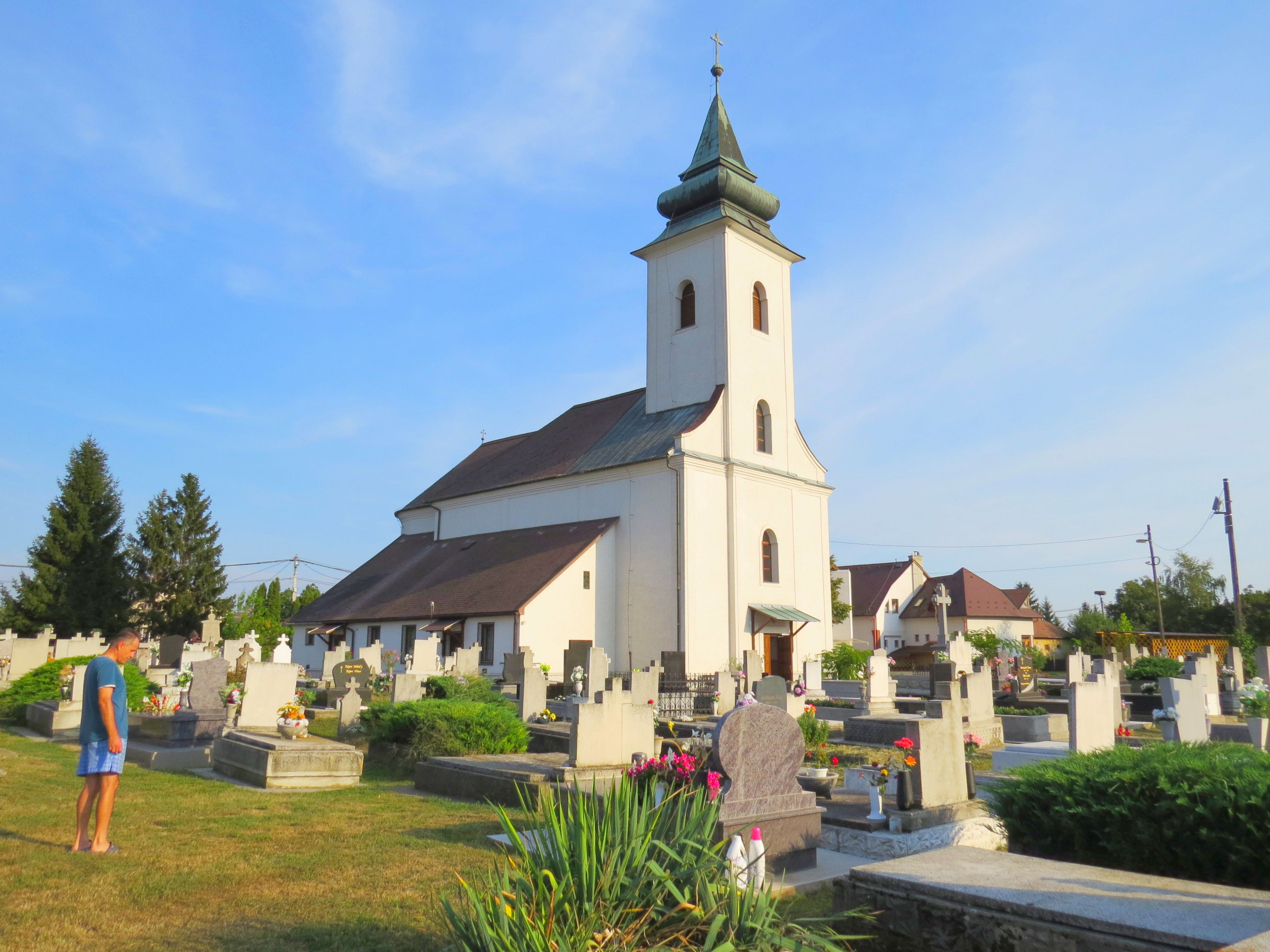
- Az ináncsi rk. Nagy Szent Teréz templom
- Interactive map of Ináncs
- Country: Hungary
- Regions: Northern Hungary
- County: Borsod-Abaúj-Zemplén County
- District: Encs District
- Time zone: UTC+1 (CET)
  - Summer (DST): UTC+2 (CEST)

Ináncs is a village in Encs District of Borsod-Abaúj-Zemplén County in northeastern Hungary.
