= Pusztaradvány =

Coordinates: 48°28′N 21°08′E

- Village
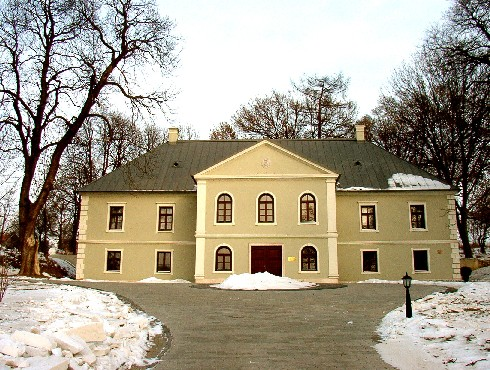
- Pusztaradvany Pallavicini
- Interactive map of Pusztaradvány
- Country: Hungary
- Regions: Northern Hungary
- County: Borsod-Abaúj-Zemplén County
- Time zone: UTC+1 (CET)
  - Summer (DST): UTC+2 (CEST)

Pusztaradvány is a village in Borsod-Abaúj-Zemplén County in northeastern Hungary.
