= Boldogkőújfalu =

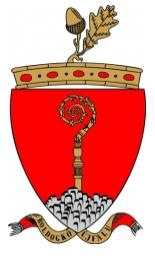
- Seal

- Location of Borsod-Abaúj-Zemplén county in Hungary

- Location of Boldogkőújfalu
- Coordinates: 48.32010°N 21.24149°E
- Country: Hungary
- County: Borsod-Abaúj-Zemplén

Area
  - Total: 10.98 km^{2} (4.24 sq mi)

Population (2004)
  - Total: 553
  - Density: 50.36/km^{2} (130.4/sq mi)
- Time zone: UTC+1 (CET)
  - Summer (DST): UTC+2 (CEST)
- Postal code: 3884
- Area code: 46

Boldogkőújfalu is a village in Borsod-Abaúj-Zemplén county, Hungary.
