= Beret, Hungary =

Beret
- Village
- Location within Hungary
- Coordinates: 48°20′37.9″N 21°1′22.26″E
- Country: Hungary
- Regions: Northern Hungary
- County: Borsod-Abaúj-Zemplén County

Area
  - Total: 6.78 km^{2} (2.62 sq mi)

Population (2008)
  - Total: 287
- Time zone: UTC+1 (CET)
  - Summer (DST): UTC+2 (CEST)

Beret is a village in Borsod-Abaúj-Zemplén County in northeastern Hungary. As of 2008 it had a population of 287.
