= Sima, Hungary =

Sima
- Location of Borsod-Abaúj-Zemplén county in Hungary

- Location of Sima, Hungary
- Coordinates: 48.29857°N 21.30285°E
- Country: Hungary
- County: Borsod-Abaúj-Zemplén

Area
  - Total: 4.88 km^{2} (1.88 sq mi)

Population (2004)
  - Total: 24
  - Density: 4.91/km^{2} (12.7/sq mi)
- Time zone: UTC+1 (CET)
  - Summer (DST): UTC+2 (CEST)
- Postal code: 3881
- Area code: 47

Sima is a village in Borsod-Abaúj-Zemplén county, Hungary.
