= Fáj =

- Village
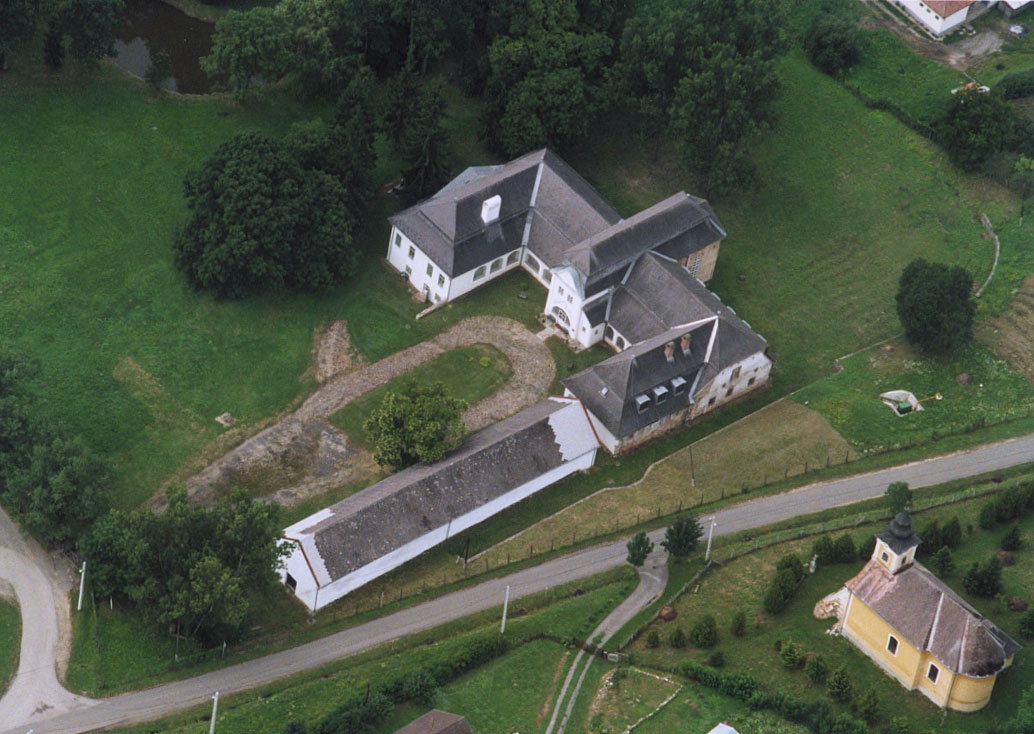

- Location within Hungary
- Coordinates: 48°25′15.53″N 21°4′39.86″E
- Country: Hungary
- Regions: Northern Hungary
- County: Borsod-Abaúj-Zemplén County

Area
  - Total: 19.32 km^{2} (7.46 sq mi)

Population (2016)
  - Total: 447
- Time zone: UTC+1 (CET)
  - Summer (DST): UTC+2 (CEST)

Fáj is a village in Borsod-Abaúj-Zemplén County in northeastern Hungary. As of 2016 it had a population of 447.
