= Forró, Hungary =

Forró
- Village
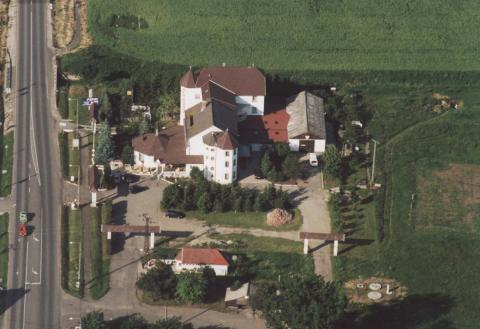

- Seal

- Location within Hungary
- Coordinates: 48°19′27.19″N 21°5′16.94″E
- Country: Hungary
- Regions: Northern Hungary
- County: Borsod-Abaúj-Zemplén County

Area
  - Total: 19.03 km^{2} (7.35 sq mi)

Population (2008)
  - Total: 2,459
- Time zone: UTC+1 (CET)
  - Summer (DST): UTC+2 (CEST)

Forró (Slovak: Forov) is a village in Borsod-Abaúj-Zemplén County in northeastern Hungary. As of 2008, the village had a population of 2,459. A large Bronze Age hoard was discovered at the village in the 19th century. The treasure is now in the collections of the British Museum, London.

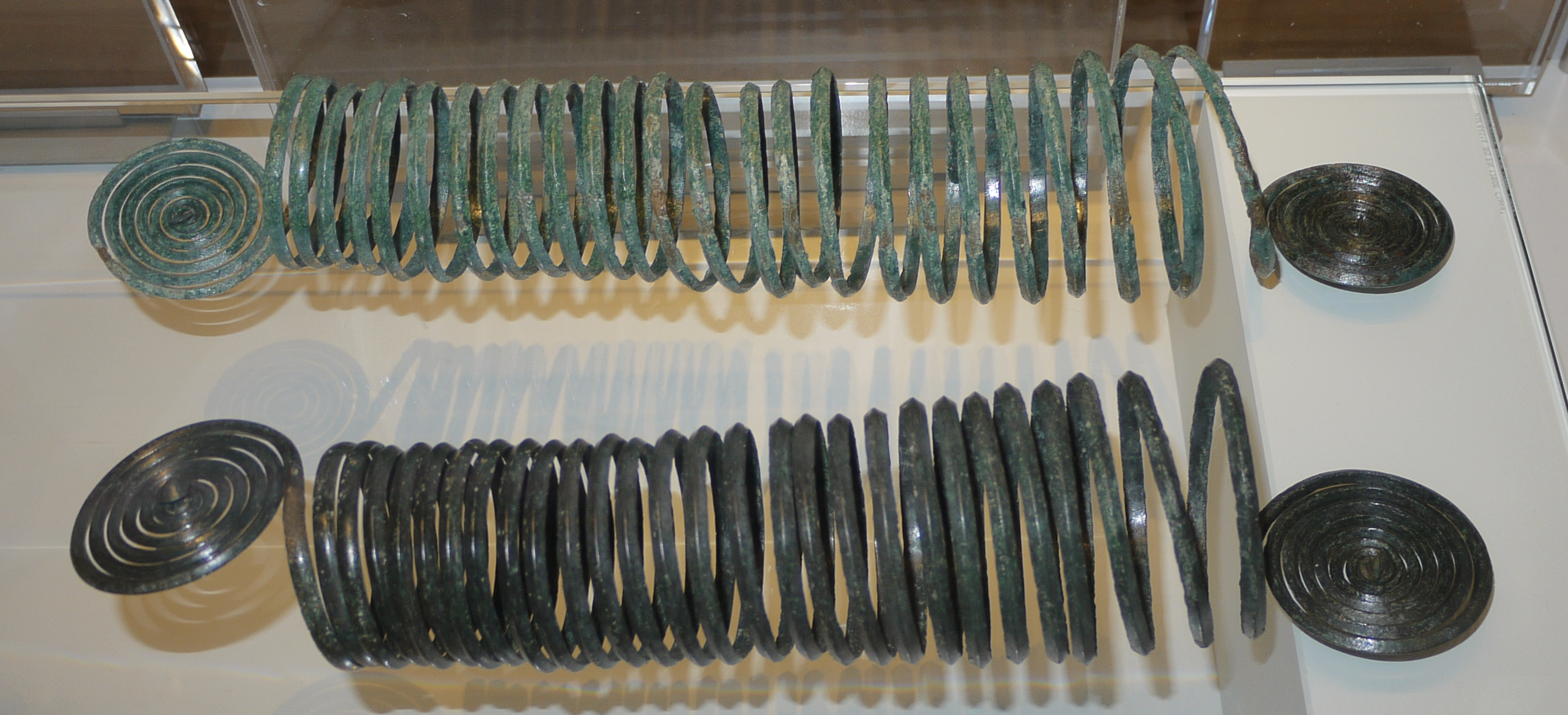
Pair of large Bronze Age arm bands from the Forró hoard on display in the British Museum (1400-1200 BC).

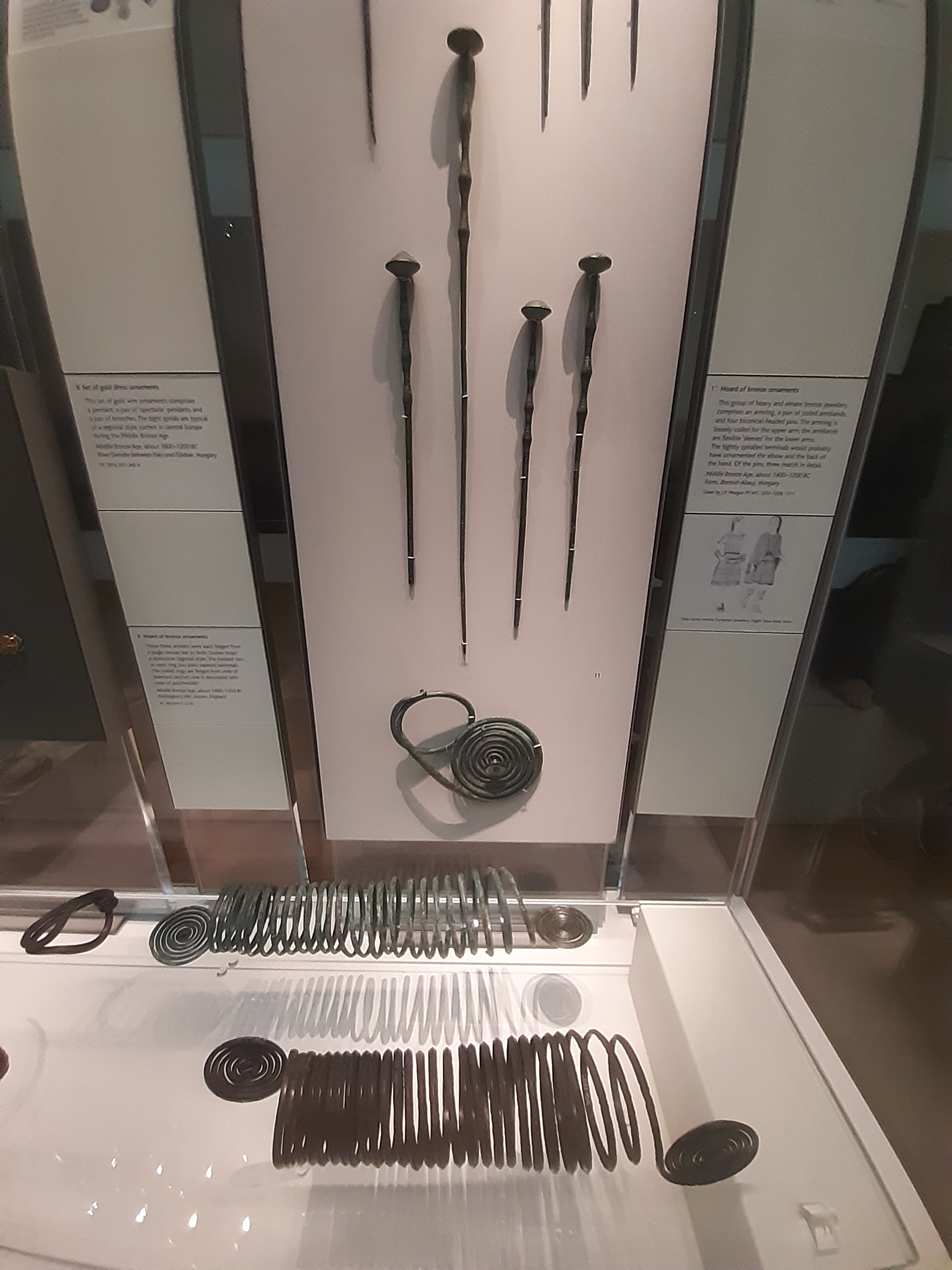
Image of the entire hoard in the British Museum.

== See also ==
- Zsujta, known for another Bronze Age hoard from northern Hungary
- Paks-Dunaföldvár, where a gold hoard from the Bronze Age was discovered
