= Fancsal =

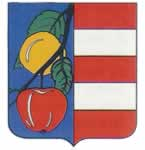
- Seal

- Location of Borsod-Abaúj-Zemplén county in Hungary

- Location of Fancsal
- Coordinates: 48.35449°N 21.06328°E
- Country: Hungary
- County: Borsod-Abaúj-Zemplén

Area
  - Total: 9.77 km^{2} (3.77 sq mi)

Population (2004)
  - Total: 388
  - Density: 39.71/km^{2} (102.8/sq mi)
- Time zone: UTC+1 (CET)
  - Summer (DST): UTC+2 (CEST)
- Postal code: 3855
- Area code: 46

Fancsal is a village in Borsod-Abaúj-Zemplén county, Hungary.
