= Encs =

- Town
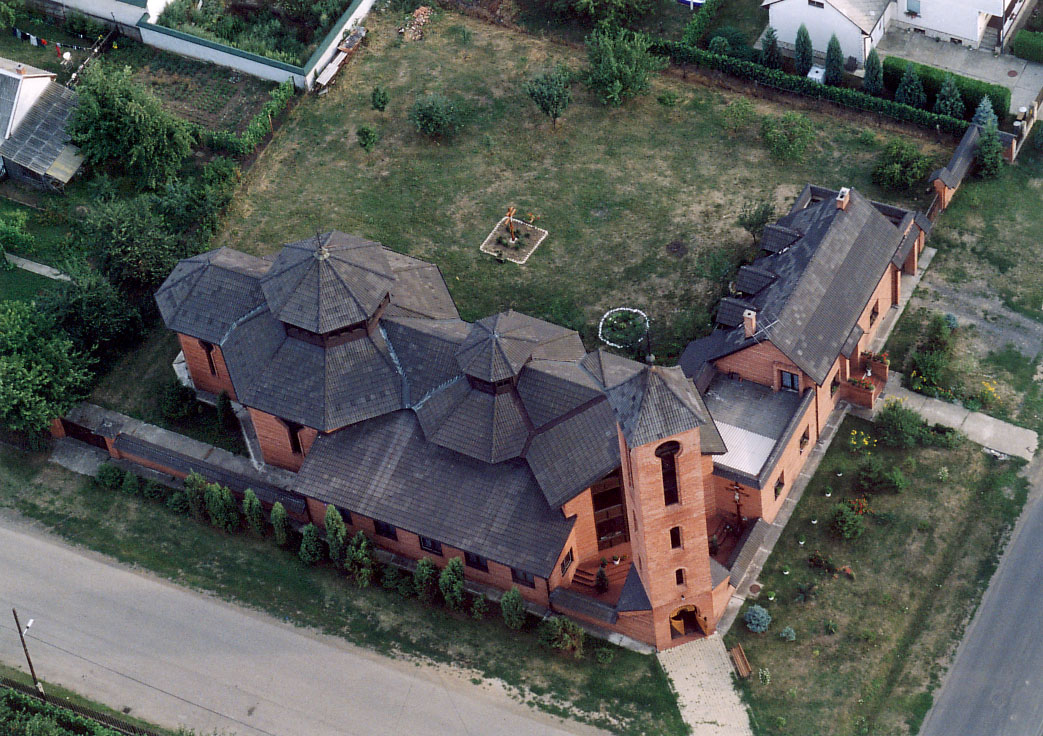
- Encs Church

- Flag Coat of arms

- Location of Encs
- Coordinates: 48.33068°N 21.12188°E
- Country: Hungary
- County: Borsod-Abaúj-Zemplén
- District: Encs

Area
  - Total: 31.13 km^{2} (12.02 sq mi)

Population (2001)
  - Total: 7,052
  - Density: 226.53/km^{2} (586.7/sq mi)
- Time zone: UTC+1 (CET)
  - Summer (DST): UTC+2 (CEST)
- Postal code: 3860
- Area code: (+36) 46
- Website: www.encs.hu

Encs is a small town in Borsod-Abaúj-Zemplén county, Northern Hungary, 30 kilometers from the county capital Miskolc.

== History ==
The area has been inhabited for at least 6,000 years. After the Hungarians occupied the area, it became part of Újvár comitatus (later Abaúj county). The first recorded mention of the village was in 1219.

The railway line reached the village in 1860. In 1880 Encs had about 1,000 residents. After the treaty of Trianon Encs was the most important village of the parts of Abaúj-Torna county that remained in Hungary. The next few decades brought prosperity. In 1962 it became the centre of the unified districts of Encs, Abaújszántó and Szikszó, and gained town status in 1984.

== Twin towns – sister cities ==
Encs is twinned with:

- Bad Dürrenberg, Germany
- Ghelința, Romania
- Kępno, Poland
- Moldava nad Bodvou, Slovakia
