= Miskolc Subregion =

Coordinates: 48°04′N 20°46′E

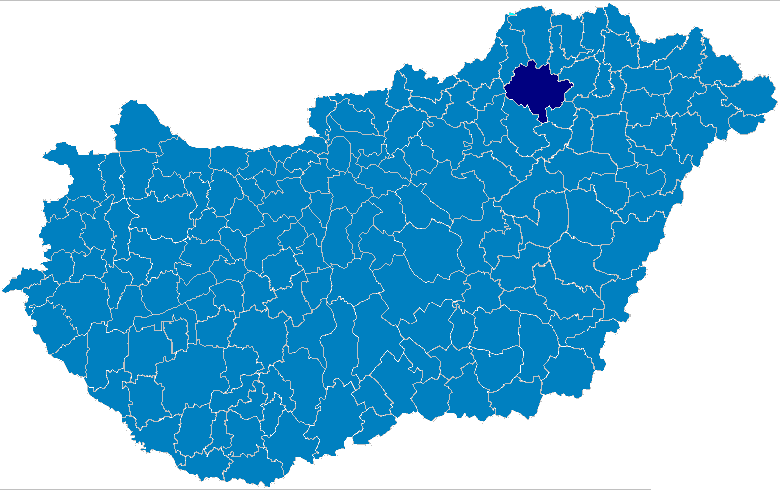
Map showing the subregion.

The Miskolc Subregion (Hungarian: Miskolci kistérség) is a subregion in Northern Hungary. Its area is 1058 km². With a population of 267,582 (2009) it is the second most populated subregion in Hungary and the most populated in Borsod-Abaúj-Zemplén county. Its centre and largest city is Miskolc; there are five other towns – Sajószentpéter, Felsőzsolca, Alsózsolca, Emőd, Nyékládháza – and thirty-four villages belonging to the subregion.

== Settlements ==
- Alacska
- Alsózsolca
- Arnót
- Berzék
- Bőcs
- Bükkaranyos
- Bükkszentkereszt
- Emőd
- Felsőzsolca
- Gesztely
- Harsány
- Hernádkak
- Hernádnémeti
- Kisgyőr
- Kistokaj
- Kondó
- Köröm
- Mályi
- Miskolc
- Muhi
- Nyékládháza
- Onga
- Ónod
- Parasznya
- Radostyán
- Répáshuta
- Sajóbábony
- Sajóecseg
- Sajóhídvég
- Sajókápolna
- Sajókeresztúr
- Sajólád
- Sajólászlófalva
- Sajópálfala
- Sajópetri
- Sajósenye
- Sajószentpéter
- Sajóvámos
- Szirmabesenyő
- Varbó

== See also ==
- Miskolc District (from 2013)
