= Miskolc District =

Miskolc District Miskolci járás
- Districts of Hungary
- Flag Coat of arms

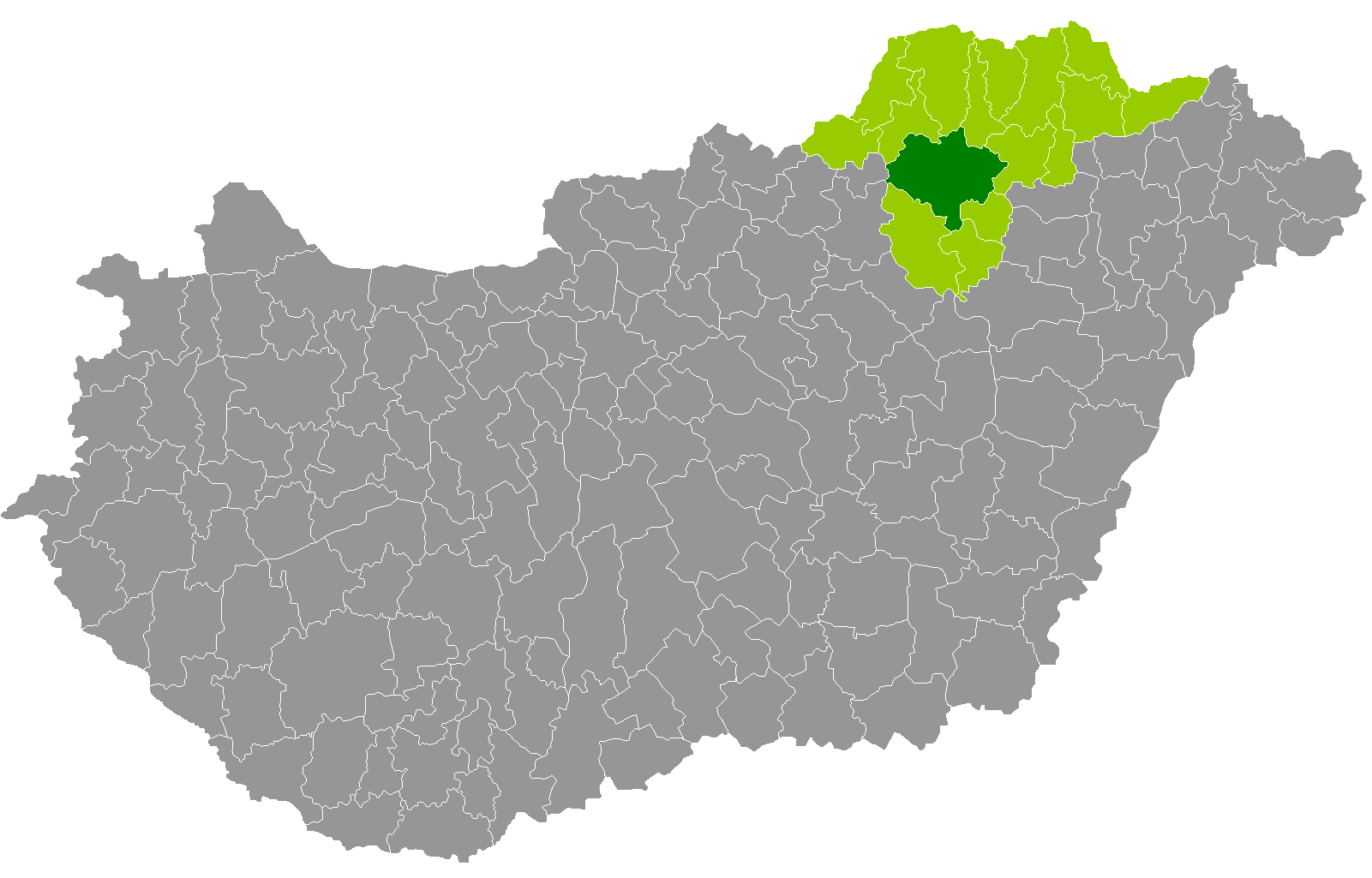
- Miskolc District within Hungary and Borsod-Abaúj-Zemplén County.
- Coordinates: 48.10°N 20.78°E
- Country: Hungary
- County: Borsod-Abaúj-Zemplén
- District seat: Miskolc

Area
  - Total: 972.80 km^{2} (375.60 sq mi)
  - Rank: 1st in Borsod-Abaúj-Zemplén

Population (2011 census)
  - Total: 250,530
  - Rank: 1st in Borsod-Abaúj-Zemplén
  - Density: 258/km^{2} (670/sq mi)

Miskolc (Hungarian: Miskolci járás) is a district in central-western part of Borsod-Abaúj-Zemplén County. Miskolc is also the name of the town where the district seat is found. The district is located in the Northern Hungary Statistical Region.

== Geography ==
Miskolc District borders with Kazincbarcika District, Edelény District and Szikszó District to the north, Szerencs District and Tiszaújváros District to the east, Mezőcsát District to the south, Mezőkövesd District to the southwest, Eger District and Bélapátfalva District (Heves County) to the west. The number of the inhabited places in Miskolc District is 39.

== Municipalities ==
The district has 1 urban county, 6 towns, 1 large village and 31 villages. (ordered by population, as of 1 January 2012)

- **Alsózsolca** (5,937)
- Arnót (2,544)
- Berzék (1,145)
- Bőcs (2,754)
- Bükkaranyos (1,467)
- Bükkszentkereszt (1,212)
- **Emőd** (4,895)
- **Felsőzsolca** (6,750)
- Gesztely (2,798)
- Harsány (2,014)
- Hernádkak (1,632)
- Hernádnémeti (3,417)
- Kisgyőr (1,648)
- Kistokaj (2,121)
- Kondó (607)
- Köröm (1,388)
- Mályi (4,111)
- **Miskolc** (166,823) – district and county seat
- **Nyékládháza** (5,001)
- **Onga** (4,775)
- Ónod (2,595)
- Parasznya (1,166)
- Radostyán (591)
- Répáshuta (464)
- **Sajóbábony** (2,782)
- Sajóecseg (1,007)
- Sajóhídvég (1,048)
- Sajókápolna (404)
- Sajókeresztúr (1,505)
- Sajólád (3,095)
- Sajólászlófalva (419)
- Sajópálfala (727)
- Sajópetri (1,515)
- Sajósenye (446)
- Sajóvámos (2,200)
- Sóstófalva (262)
- Szirmabesenyő (4,344)
- Újcsanálos (867)
- Varbó (1,087)

The bolded municipalities are cities, italics municipality is large village.

== Demographics ==
Religion in Miskolc District (2011 census)
1. Catholic Church (32.0%)
2. Greek Catholicism (4.30%)
3. Calvinism (17.7%)
4. Lutheranism (0.80%)
5. Other religions (1.70%)
6. Non-religious (14.3%)
7. Atheists (1.30%)
8. Undeclared (27.9%)

In 2011, it had a population of 250,530 and the population density was 258/km².

Year	County population	Change
2011	250,530	n/a

=== Ethnicity ===
Besides the Hungarian majority, the main minorities are the Roma (approx. 12,500), German (1,200), Slovak (1,000), Rusyn and Romanian (300), Polish, Russian and Bulgarian (200), Greek and Ukrainian (150) and Arab (100).

Total population (2011 census): 250,530
Ethnic groups (2011 census): Identified themselves: 232,864 persons:

- Hungarians: 215,090 (92.37%)
- Gypsies: 12,061 (5.18%)
- Others and indefinable: 5,713 (2.45%)

Approx. 18,000 persons in Miskolc District did not declare their ethnic group at the 2011 census.

=== Religion ===
Religious adherence in the county according to 2011 census:

- Catholic – 90,927 (Roman Catholic – 80,143; Greek Catholic – 10,765);
- Reformed – 44,505;
- Evangelical – 1,925;
- other religions – 4,215;
- Non-religious – 35,919;
- Atheism – 3,197;
- Undeclared – 69,842.

== Gallery ==
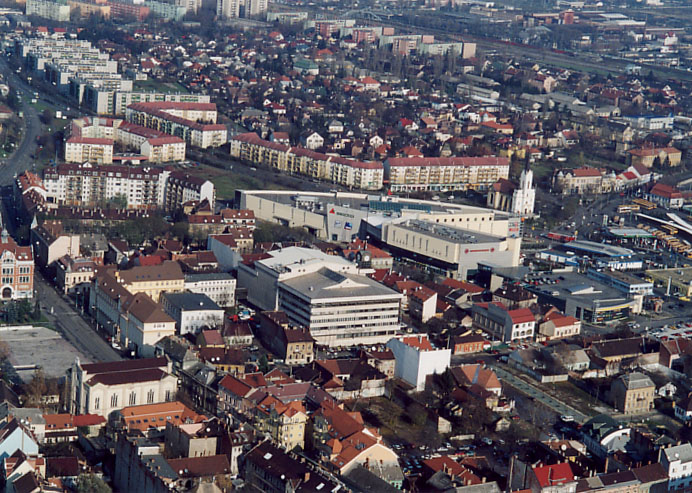
Miskolc, the district seat

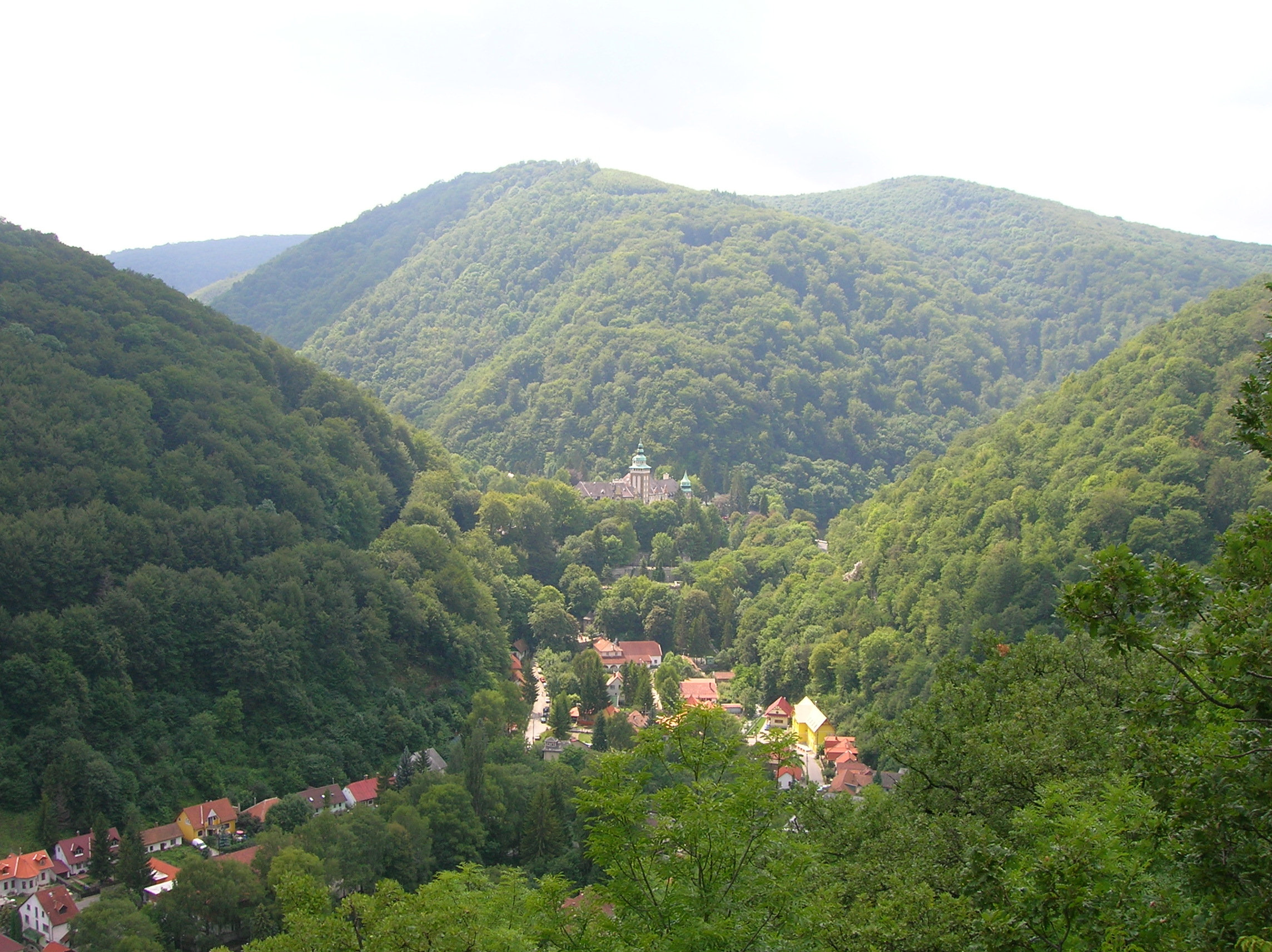
Aerial view of Lillafüred

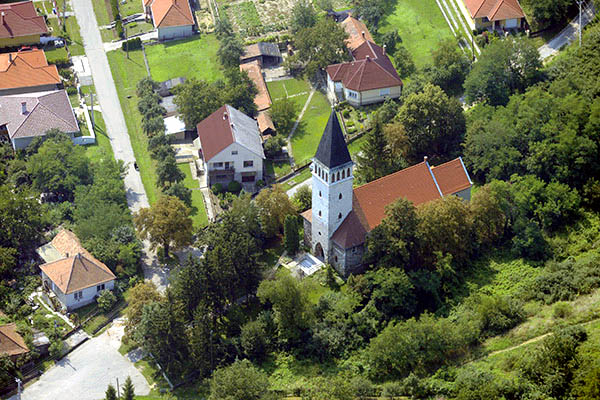
View of Nyékládháza

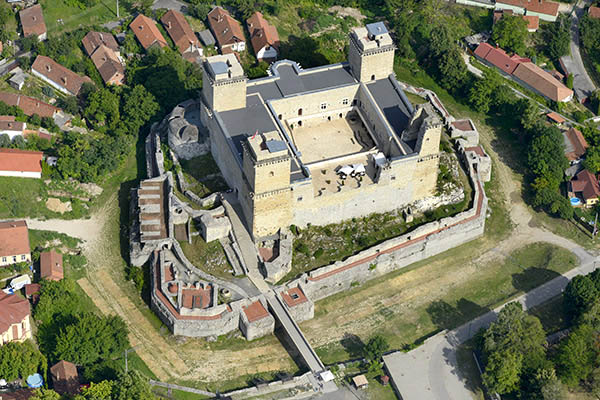
Diósgyőr Castle

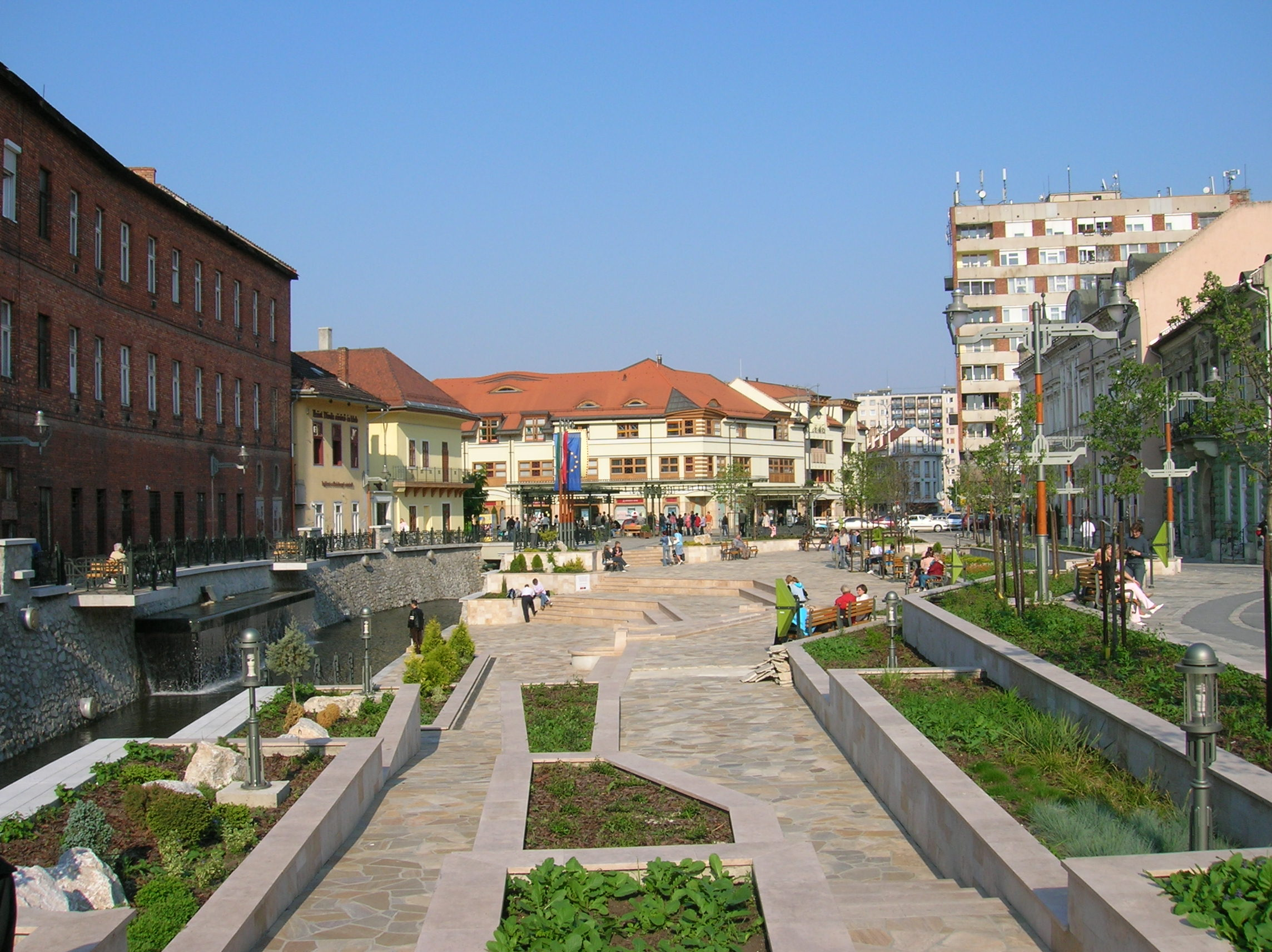
Szinva Terrace

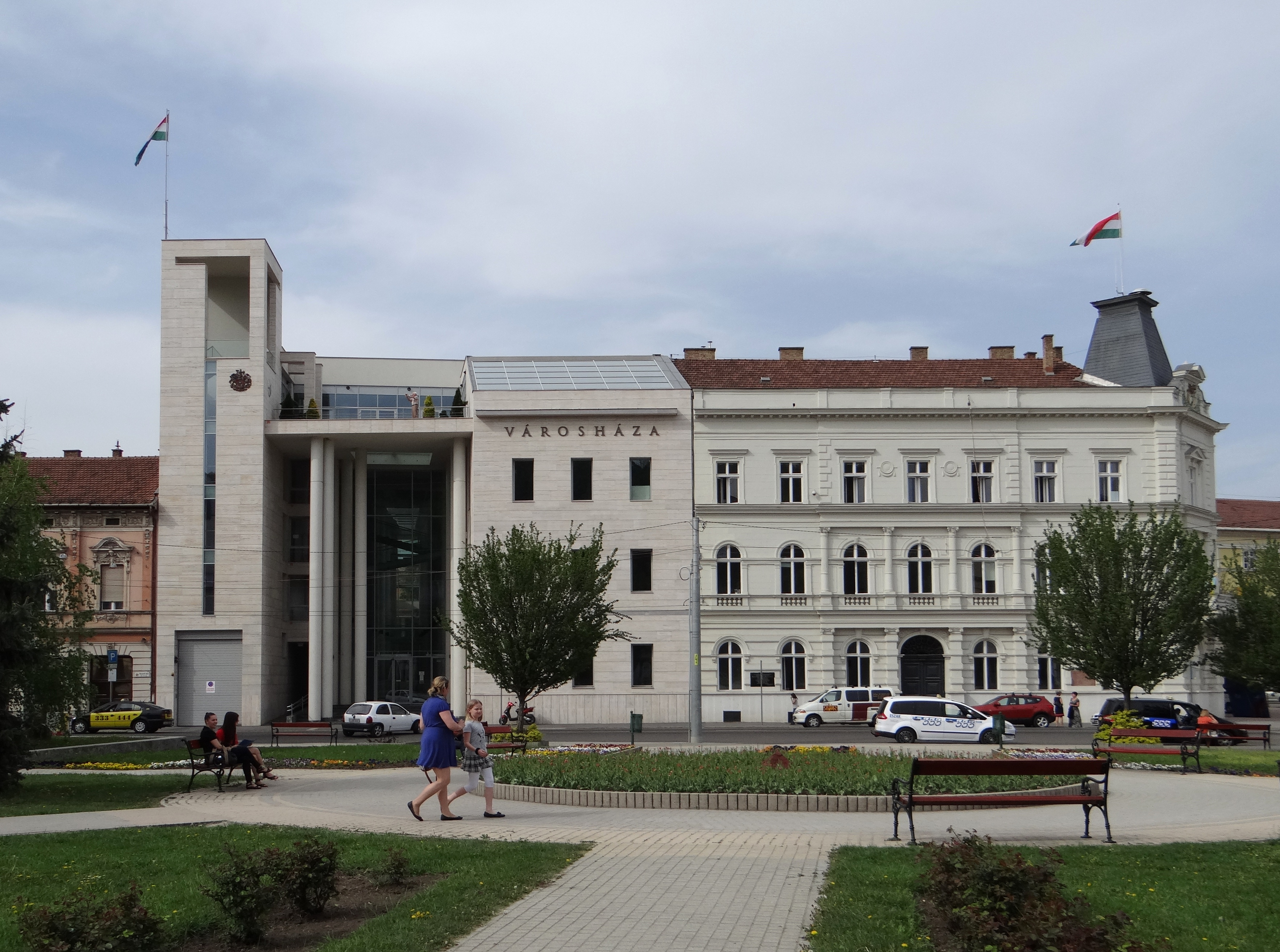
Town Hall in Miskolc

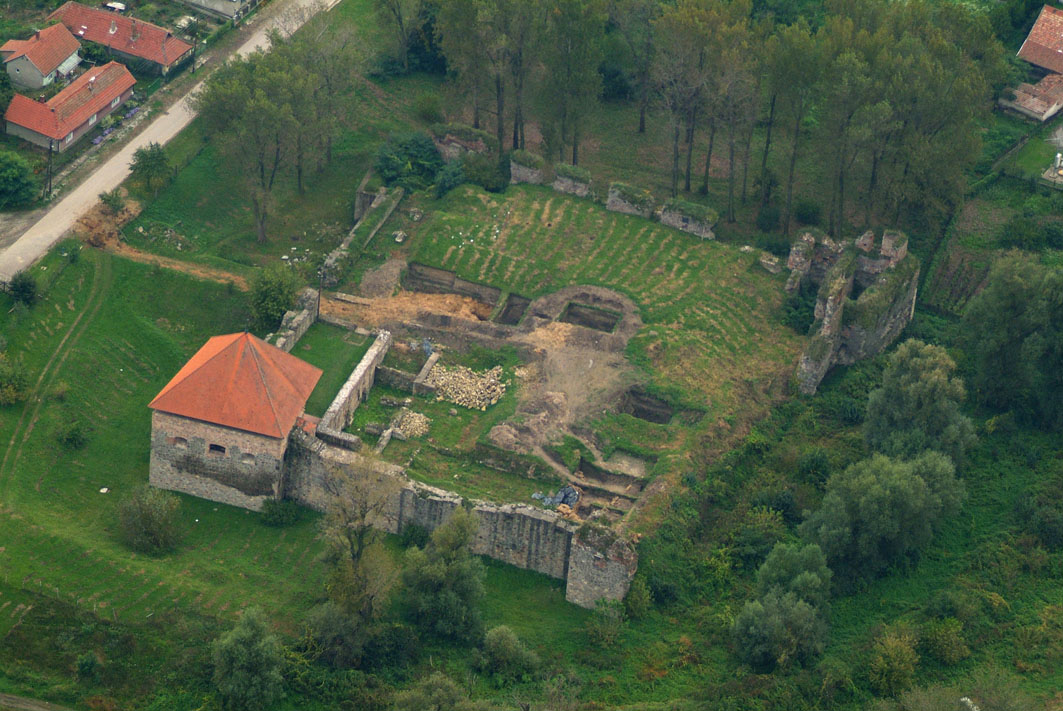
Ónod Castle

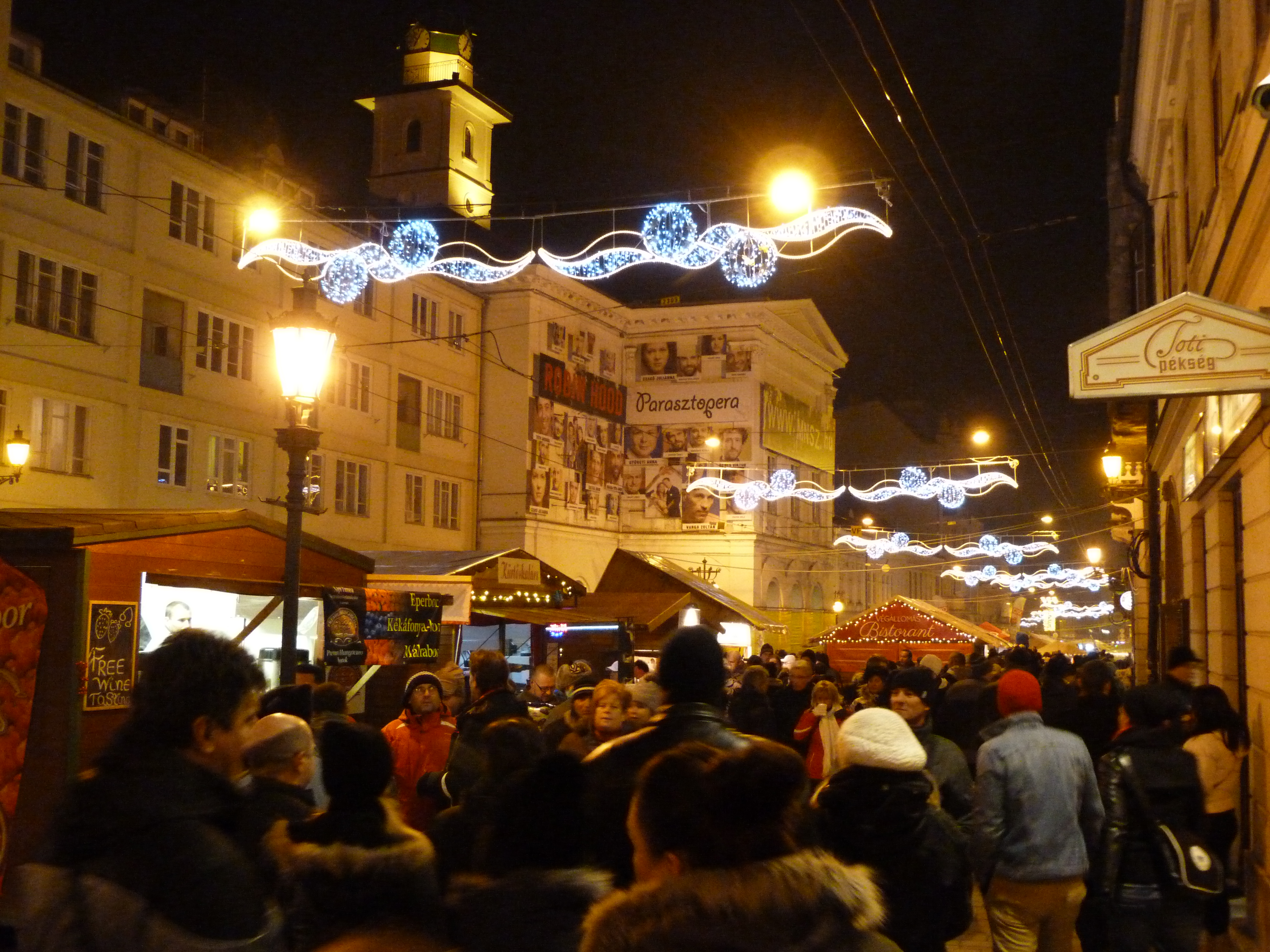
Meat-jelly Festival

== See also ==
- List of cities and towns of Hungary
- Miskolc Subregion (until 2013)
