= Stephen Ákos =

Stephen (I) Ákos
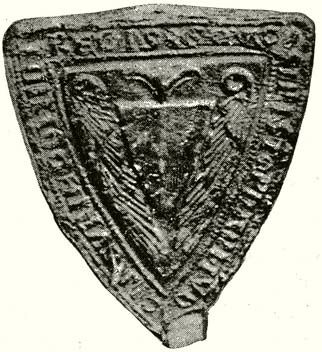
- Seal of Stephen Ákos

Palatine of Hungary
- Reign: 1301–1307 (alongside others)
- Predecessor: Amadeus Aba
- Successor: several others
- Born: c. 1260
- Died: 1315
- Noble family: gens Ákos
- Spouse: Catherine N
- Issue: seven sons two daughters
- Father: Ernye

Stephen (I) from the kindred Ákos (Hungarian: Ákos nembeli (I.) István; died 1315) was an influential baron in the Kingdom of Hungary in the late 13th century and the early 14th century. He was born into an ancient Hungarian clan. He was a staunch supporter of Andrew III of Hungary. He served as Judge royal between 1298 and 1300, and Palatine of Hungary from 1301 to 1307.

Establishing a province in Borsod County, he was among the so-called oligarchs, who ruled de facto independently their dominions during the era of feudal anarchy. He built the Diósgyőr Castle, the centre of his domain. Initially, he was a partisan of Wenceslaus after the extinction of the Árpád dynasty, but later acknowledged Charles' claim to the throne and gradually retired from politics. After his death in 1315, his sons rebelled against Charles and their dominion had collapsed in the subsequent years.

== Life and career ==
=== Early years ===
He was the only son of Ernye Ákos who held several offices during the reigns of Béla IV, Stephen V and Ladislaus IV. Ernye belonged to the ancient and prestigious gens (clan) Ákos, but originated from its lesser branch, which had some landholdings in Bihar County. During Béla's reign, he elevated into the most powerful barons due to his military successes. He retained his influence between the anarchic conditions under Ladislaus' rule. When Stephen was born in the early 1260s, his father was already a prominent landowner in Borsod County, who built Dédes Castle and possessed large-scale estates in the region. The so-called Ernye branch rose to prominence due to its paterfamilias' influence and aptitude. Stephen's uncles were Albert the Great (Master of the horse from 1270 to 1272 and Ban of Severin in 1272), and Erdő II. One of his cousins was Mojs I, who functioned as Count of the Székelys in 1291.

Stephen Ákos was first mentioned in 1281, when already reached adulthood. At that time he was ispán, or head, of Borsod and Gömör Counties. In the 1280s, he was a close supporter of Ladislaus IV of Hungary. According to a royal charter's narratio, Stephen spent his youth in the royal court, performing various services and earning merit. Stephen participated in the royal campaign against the rebellious Finta Aba in mid-1281. He was present at the siege of Gede Castle (present-day Hodejov in Slovakia), according to his own charter from 1284. During the action, he was captured and imprisoned for a short time. He recovered his liberty after a ransom of 60 marks was paid by his familiaris Albert Szuhai. Stephen Ákos also fought against the rebellious Cumans in the battle at Lake Hód (near present-day Hódmezővásárhely) in 1282 and participated in the siege of Borostyánkő (now Bernstein in Austria) at the end of the year, which was held by the Kőszegis. The Kőszegis resisted, forcing Ladislaus to lift the siege in early 1283.

It seems, Stephen lost political influence at the royal court and his promising career has stalled after 1283. There is no record of royal land donations and he did not hold any specific offices in these years. His biographer, historian Péter Kis considers Stephen voluntarily retired from the royal court to manage his growing possessions in Borsod County, which became the basis of his future's domain.

=== Andrew's partisan ===
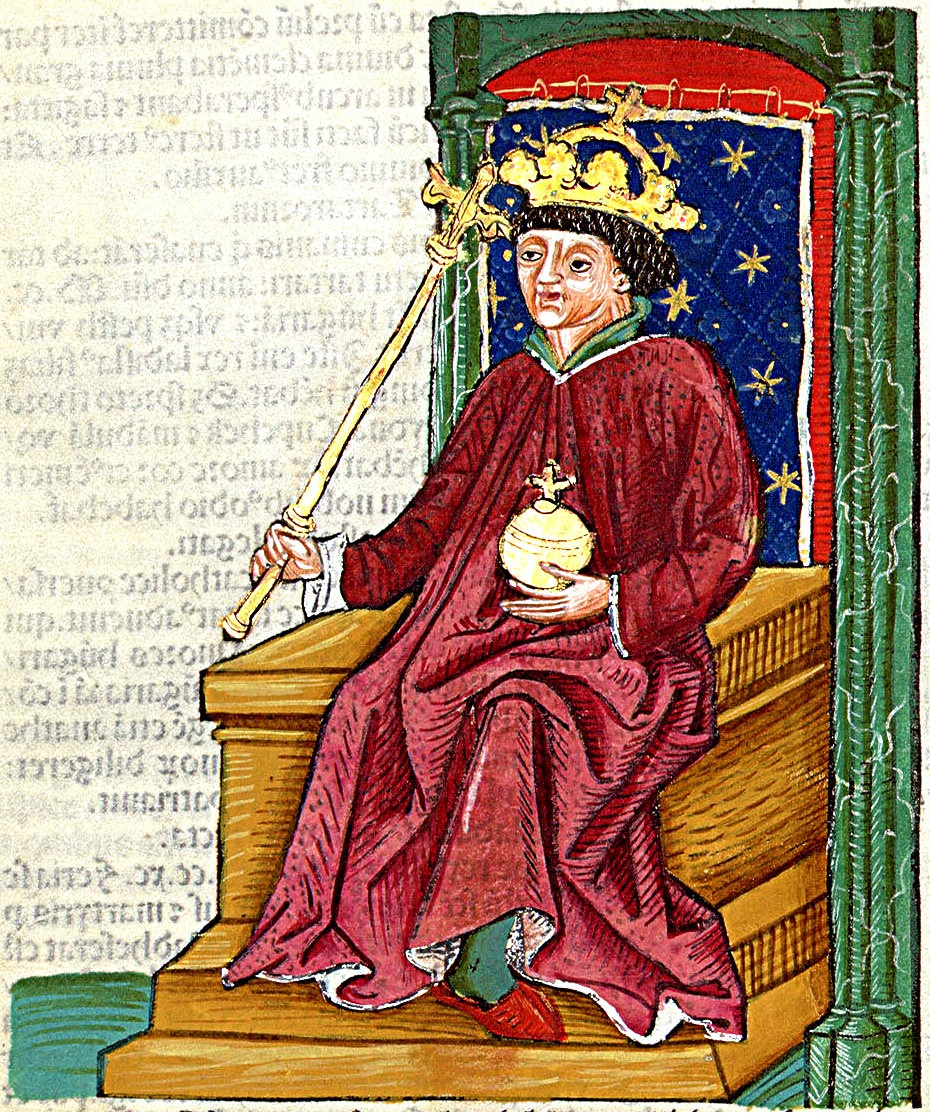
Andrew III (d. 1301), the "last golden branch" of the bloodline of holy kings, as Stephen Ákos remembered his king in 1303

As a royal charter formulates from 1298, Stephen Ákos belonged to the "familiares" of Andrew III of Hungary since his arrival to Hungary in early 1290. The king made Stephen the queen's treasurer in 1293. He held the dignity until the death of Andrew's first spouse Fenenna of Kuyavia in 1295. Albeit Stephen was considered a strong pillar of the royal power, Andrew III did not support his all efforts. For instance, when Andrew, Bishop of Eger complaint to the king in 1296 that Stephen had unlawfully seized the bishopric's two estates (Cserép and Kisgyőr), King Andrew permitted him to launch a lawsuit in any court. Beside his activity in Hungary, Stephen established interests in the Kingdom of Bohemia too, already in the early 1290s. He provided assistance to Wenceslaus II to conquer the Duchy of Kraków. As a result, Thasso de Vissinburg, Wenceslaus' viceroy as captain of Kraków and Sandomierz, donated two estates called Wirvitzy (possibly Wierzbica) beyond the river Vistula to Stephen in August 1294. Stephen remained a supporter of Wenceslaus' efforts in Kraków. Therefore, captain Vocco donated the right of stone transport and other privileges (tax exemption) in the aforementioned region to Stephen in 1300.

Stephen was appointed Judge royal in the summer of 1298, serving in this capacity at least until August 1300 (but it is also presumable that he held the dignity until Andrew's death in early 1301). The importance of the position had deteriorated by then, since Hungary was in a state of constant anarchy during the second half of Andrew's reign. While Stephen Ákos' dignity became a symbolic position and a "prey" in the feudal civil wars, when various groups of barons fought each other, his deputy, the vice-judge royal, as the monarch's personally appointed confidential expert, elevated into an effective judicial role. For instance, when Stephen Ákos acted as Judge royal, his "deputy" Stephen issued more documents in cases of litigation proceedings, than him. In 1298, vice-judge royal Stephen still used his nominal superior's seal, but by 1300, he adopted his own seal. Stephen Ákos was the last Judge royal during the era of the Árpád dynasty. Thereafter the position was in a state of vacancy for a decade, when the Kingdom of Hungary had disintegrated into autonomous provinces ruled by powerful oligarchs.

Andrew held an assembly of the prelates, noblemen, Saxons, Székelys, and Cumans in Pest in the summer of 1298. Its decrees authorized Andrew to destroy forts built without permission and ordered the punishment of those who had seized landed property with force, but also threatened Andrew with excommunication if he did not apply the decrees. After the close of the diet, Andrew entered into a formal alliance with five influential noblemen – Amadeus Aba, Stephen Ákos, Dominic Rátót, Demetrius Balassa and Paul Szécs – who stated that they were willing to support him against the "rebellious lords", which term definitely covered Matthew Csák and the Kőszegi family. Only Stephen Ákos' contract had been preserved. Andrew committed himself that he will support Stephen and his kinship in their efforts and will make peace with the rebellious lords only with the consent of Stephen Ákos. In response, Stephen accepted Andrew as his "natural lord" and swore an oath that will defend his king against his all opponents, even against the Pope. According to the treaty, he had a friendly relationship with Demetrius Balassa, another ally of Andrew III. Through his unidentified daughter, Stephen also related to Dominic Rátót, who established a dominion in the neighboring Nógrád County with his brothers and cousins. The Rátót and Ákos provinces cut off the expanding Csák domain from the royal lands, while Stephen Ákos and Dominic Rátót also received royal support to defend their landholdings and to isolate the Csáks and the Kőszegis from each other. Thereafter Stephen Ákos was a member of the royal council and acted in various occasions alongside his allies, who also concluded their alliance with Andrew.

In response to Andrew's newly formed league, a group of powerful lords —including the Kőszegis, Matthew Csák and Roland Borsa — urged Charles II of Naples to send his grandson, the 12-year-old Charles Robert, to Hungary in order to become king, according to the Illuminated Chronicle. The young prince disembarked in Split in August 1300, supported by most Croatian and Slavonian lords. However, the Kőszegis and Matthew Csák were shortly reconciled with Andrew, preventing Charles' success. Historian Attila Zsoldos argued Andrew III entered into a new feudal contract with the barons in the summer of 1300: Matthew Csák and Ivan Kőszegi became "perpetual" Palatines and Andrew accepted their suzerainty over their provinces, while the king's two most powerful partisans, Amadeus Aba and Stephen Ákos were also granted this privilege. In addition to them, two co-palatines of the previous year, Roland Rátót and Apor Péc also received the title as a counterweight, according to Zsoldos' theory. Therefore, the historian considers Stephen already bore the dignity of Palatine in the last regnal year of Andrew.

=== A loyal oligarch ===
Andrew III died on 14 January 1301. With his death, the House of Árpád became extinct. Stephen Ákos referred to Andrew as "the last golden branch" of the tree of King St Stephen's family, years after the king's death. According to his narration, the people of the realm, regardless of social status, mourned their lord, as "Rachel wept for her children". A civil war between various claimants to the throne—Charles of Anjou, Wenceslaus of Bohemia, and Otto of Bavaria—followed Andrew's death and lasted for seven years. Hungary had disintegrated into about a dozen independent provinces, each ruled by a powerful lord, or oligarch. Among them, Matthew Csák dominated the northwestern parts of Hungary (which now form the western territories of present-day Slovakia), Amadeus Aba controlled the northeastern lands, the Kőszegis ruled Transdanubia, James Borsa dominated Tiszántúl, and Ladislaus Kán governed Transylvania. Stephen Ákos was the de facto ruler of Borsod and Gömör counties, his small dominion wedged between the extensive empires of Matthew Csák and Amadeus Aba.

Historian Attila Zsoldos draws a distinction between the "oligarchs" (e.g. Matthew Csák and the Kőszegis) and "provincial lords" (e.g. Ugrin Csák) regarding the role of the royal power in the provincial administration. Alongside Amadeus Aba or Ladislaus Kán, Stephen Ákos exercised sovereign rights in his domain but remained loyal to the kings, and never rebelled against Andrew III or Charles I. Therefore, Zsoldos refers to him as a "loyal oligarch".

The oligarchic provinces in the early 14th century

Being Pope Boniface VIII's candidate for the Hungarian throne, Charles had always been unpopular, because the Hungarian lords feared that they would "lose their freedom by accepting a king appointed by the Church", according to the Illuminated Chronicle. Stephen Ákos was among those lords, who initially supported the claim of Wenceslaus. The Hungarian lords and prelates decided to offer the crown to the young prince and sent a delegation to his father, Wenceslaus II to Bohemia. An envoy – a certain Stephen, son of Lodomer – also represented the Ákos family's interests in the delegation. Historians Mór Wertner and Kabos Kandra considered that Stephen had the most leading role in offering the crown to Wenceslaus II, then his namesake son. However, some near-contemporary sources emphasize Ivan Kőszegi's influence. Wenceslaus was crowned king on 27 August 1301. Stephen Ákos was first referred as Palatine of Hungary in Wenceslaus' royal charter on 23 October. In the upcoming years, seven barons held the dignity simultaneously. Majority of the historians, including Gyula Kristó and Jenő Szűcs, considered, these barons, for instance, Matthew Csák, Amadeus Aba, Ivan Kőszegi and Stephen Ákos were arbitrarily styled themselves palatines, usurping the position, which marked its devaluation. However, in accordance with Zsoldos' theory (as presented above), the claimants to the Hungarian throne inherited Andrew's last decision, and they were forced to accept the status quo. As Zsoldos emphasized the oligarchs recognized each other's titles, in addition to the monarchs, cathedral chapters and other institutions. Accordingly, Stephen Ákos was considered a "perpetual" Palatine, alongside other powerful lords. After Charles's third coronation, which was performed in full accordance with customary law, on 27 August 1310, the king recognized only James Borsa as Palatine, who was appointed to the position in 1306 by Charles. Despite that, the still living office-holders, including Stephen Ákos were styled themselves palatines until their death.

When his namesake son's wedding took place in Diósgyőr in February 1303, Stephen Ákos was still a loyal partisan of Wenceslaus. When the cathedral chapter of Eger complaint to the royal court that Stephen unlawfully seized their lands, Wenceslaus reproved his courtier in his royal charter issued on 5 May 1303, and urged Stephen to stop dominations and the unlawful takeovers of church lands. Perhaps this contradiction could have led Stephen to left Wladislaus' alliance, whose domestic support was otherwise drastically reduced by that time. Stephen Ákos acknowledged Charles I as his monarch in his document issued on 5 April 1304. Wenceslaus, left Hungary in summer 1304, taking the Holy Crown with him. It is plausible that Stephen participated in the war against Bohemia in the autumn of 1304, when Charles I and Rudolph III of Austria jointly invaded the kingdom. According to the contemporary Chronicle of Osterhofen (Chronicon Osterhoviense), both Ivan Kőszegi and Stephen Ákos were present in the coronation of another pretender Otto in December 1305. Stephen Ákos and his eldest son, Nicholas were present at the Diet of Rákos on 10 October 1307, which confirmed Charles' claim to the throne. Thereafter he retired from politics, gradually lost influence in the royal court. He participated in the Diet of 1313. There, Judge royal John Csák referred to him as "former" palatine. Stephen Ákos died in 1315. Soon after, his sons rebelled against Charles and their province had collapsed in the subsequent years.

== His province ==
=== Acquisition of lands ===
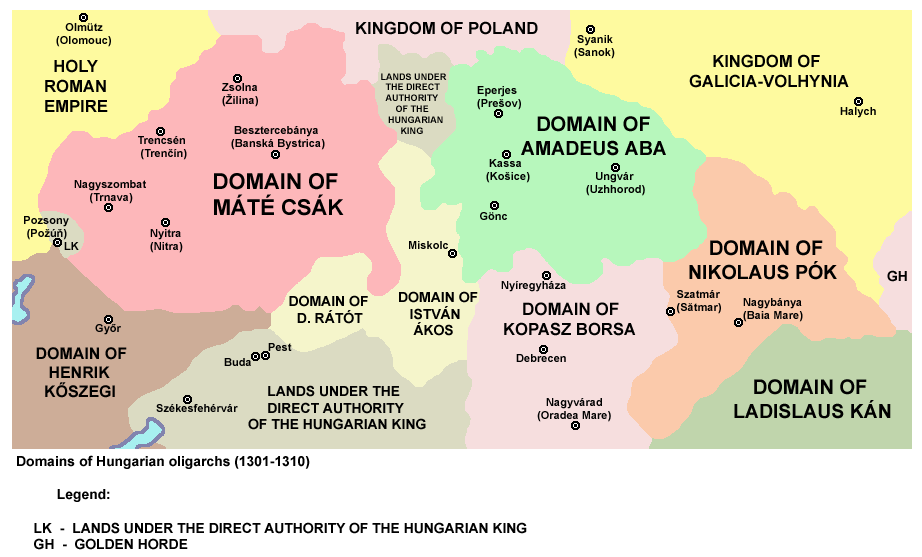
The domain of Stephen Ákos (yellow), which laid mostly in Borsod County

When Ernye Ákos died in 1274 or 1275, Stephen inherited Dédes, Diósgyőr, Ecseg, Felbarca, Héty, Kondó and Mályinka in Borsod from his father, in addition to other lands in Nógrád, Heves, Bihar, Szatmár, Szabolcs and Zemplén counties, but he also had some portions in Varaždin County. By 1281, Stephen acquired Visnyó (present-day Višňov, Slovakia), Uppony, Tét, Tardona, Arnót and Zsolca (present-day Felsőzsolca and Alsózsolca) with its valuable customs (the local wooden bridge, owned by the Ákos clan, was the single crossing at the bank of Sajó stream in a direction to Miskolc during that time). Stephen Ákos was involved in various lawsuits and conflicts with the local rival noble family, the gens Miskolc. In 1281, he concluded an agreement with the three sons of the late Panyit Miskolc, during which he returned the fishpond of Filtó (present-day belongs to Tiszaújváros) to them. In the same year, he was granted the land of Olaszegyház by Ladislaus. Still in 1281, Stephen signed a land contract with the privileged nobles of Parasznya, and exchanged his village of Hernádnémeti in Zemplén County with their portions in Parasznya. He also exchanged Visnyó for Bóta. He became the owner of Abod in 1284. These fragmented data shows that Stephen sought to expand his possessions in the Borsod region to establish a territoriality integrated dominion of his possessions. During the reign of Andrew III, he was mentioned as a neighboring landowner near Felsőtelekes and Bükkaranyos in 1291. He was granted the village of Omány by Wenceslaus in 1301, shortly after his coronation. The king also provided him undetermined "valuable goods". By 1303, he also acquired Varbó.

Stephen expanded his wealth with dominations, the popular method of the era. He had various conflicts with the Bishopric of Eger since the 1290s. He caused serious material damage to Briccius Báthory, when his troops plundered and looted his landholdings in Szabolcs County. He invaded and seized the land portions of the Gutkeleds in Tarján and Palkonya in 1301. Based on his father's royal grants, Stephen Ákos urged to establish a contiguous area of his acquired lands with the tools of his purchases, exchanges and unlawful armed attacks. As historian Péter Kis analyzed, two main estate centers emerged during decades; the first laid in the north of the Bükk Mountains, in the valley of the Báni, Tardona and Varbó streams, while the second block was in the upper flow of the Szinva stream. The sporadic landholdings in Nógrád and Heves counties belonged there too. Five villages at the lower flow of Sajó connected these two centers with each other.

To become the undisputed lord in Borsod County, Stephen Ákos defeated his opponents in the region over the decades. With the unfavorable exchange of lands, he ousted the noble families of Parasznya from the territory of the county. He did the same with the Dédesi family, and the gens (clan) Bél in the southwestern part of the county. Stephen inherited a lengthy and complicated struggle with the clan Miskolc from his father, which lasted since the early 1260s between Ernye Ákos and Panyit Miskolc. The agreement of 1281 signed a compromise solution, when the boundary between the two spheres of interest was drawn along the river Sajó. At the end of the 13th century, Panyit's branch became extinct; by then Stephen Ákos' possessions surrounded their lands around Miskolc.

=== Administration ===
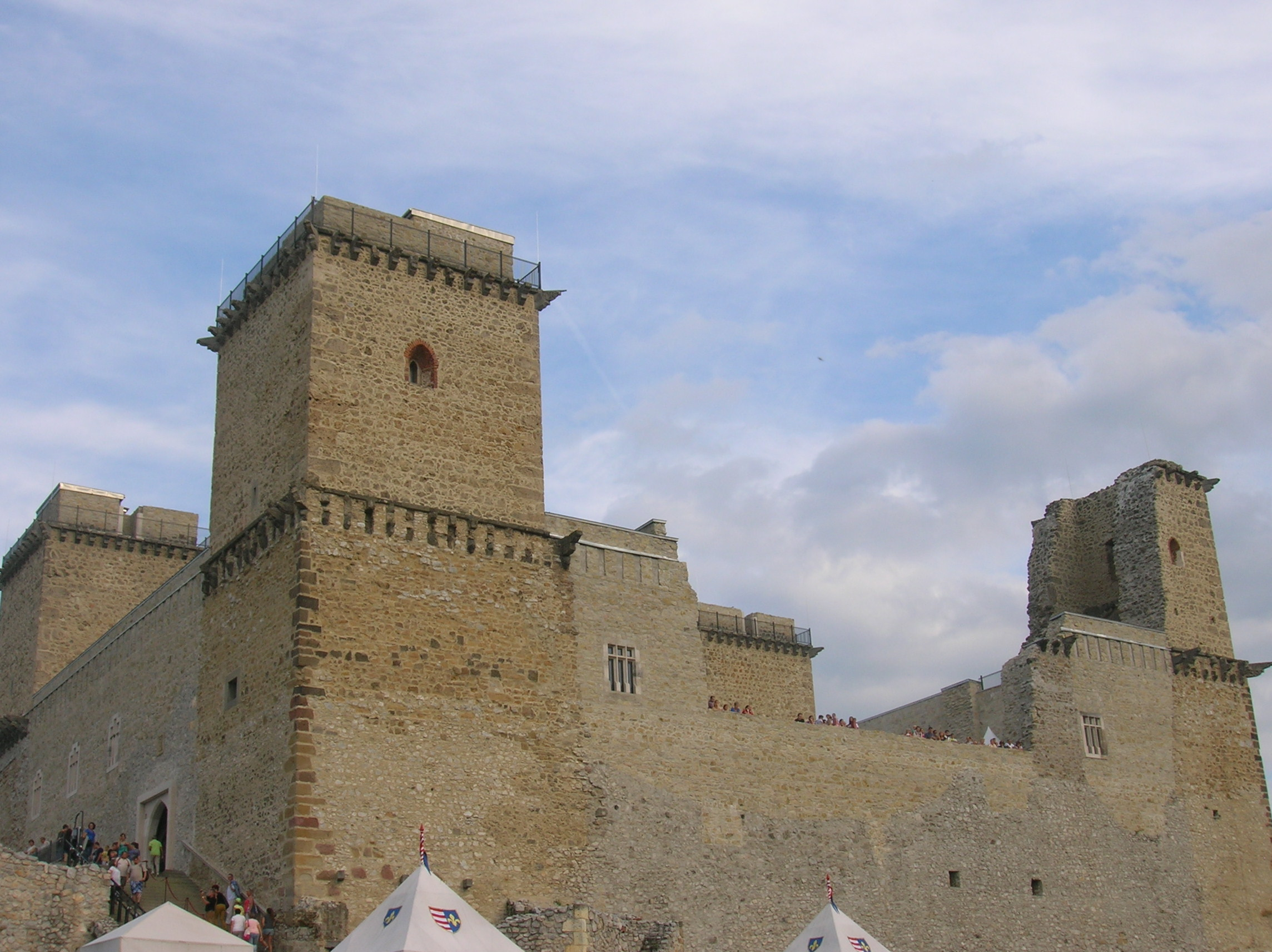
The Diósgyőr Castle after its renovation in 2014

The Ákos kindred built their centre in Diósgyőr (present-day in Miskolc), where Stephen erected a castle at the turn of the 13th and 14th centuries. When the royal troops besieged and captured the castle in 1319, it was referred to as "Újvár" ("New Castle"), which suggests that the fortress itself was completed only a few years before the Ákos' fall. Archaeological excavations were carried out in the area in 1973, when a four-room building that had been destroyed by fire was uncovered. It is possible they found Stephen's former mansion house, which functioned as the family's residence at least until 1311, when the last charter was issued there. Stephen also established a Pauline monastery in 1304 in the former village of Majlád, one and a half kilometers from the castle, and next to his mansion. He sponsored the monastery until his death. The monastery also had a scriptorium; one of the codices created here had been copied by a monk named Ladislaus for the Church on the Avas Hill, now held in the archives of Eger. Sometimes before 1313, Stephen founded the Pauline convent of Dédesszentlélek (Bükkszentlélek), dedicated to the Holy Spirit. Beside the religious donations, the elements of chivalry also can be found in the dominion of Stephen Ákos. His crest was preserved from 1299.

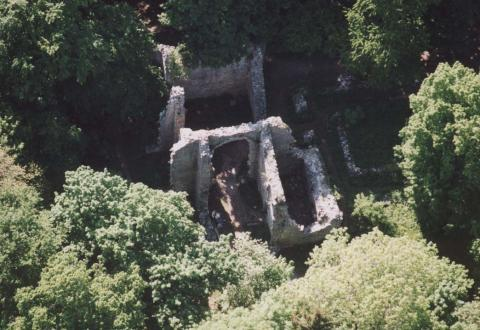
The ruins of the Pauline monastery in Bükkszentlélek

Until 1303, Stephen Ákos used the cathedral chapter of Eger as place of authentication, acknowledging its nature of legal institution. Thereafter, however, his documents and charters were issued by his own chancellery, which resided in Diósgyőr. For instance, when he granted Varbó to his familiaris, Stephen, son of Lodomer, he used peculiar, poetic narration and preliminary in the donation letter. A privilege document to the Pauline Order from 1304 also contained Biblical phrases. Stephen's chancellery employed skilled notaries and literate friars.

The oligarchic domains based on the social institution of familiares, as the personal relationships networked the entire domain. Stephen's earliest known servant was Herbord Unyomi, who originated from Vas County and entered the clan's service, when Ernye Ákos served as ispán of the county from 1267. He escorted his lord, Stephen in the various military campaigns in the early 1280s. Stephen donated the village of Kondó to Herbord in 1284. Another servant, Albert Szuhai was granted the land of Felbarca by Stephen in 1287, since he had previously released his lord from captivity by paying ransom. The Szuhais owned villages, Szuha and Zubogy in Gömör County. Stephen donated his portion in Palkonya to his familiaris Ladislaus Béli in 1295. His skilled diplomat was a certain Stephen, son of Lodomer. He fought in Andrew's royal army, then was captured by Matthew Csák's troops, where he was liberated after a ransom of 100 marks. Stephen acted as the Ákos' envoy to Bohemia in 1301. He also escorted the bride of Stephen II Ákos in early 1303. Another familiaris, Michael Öklelő and his sons owned seven villages in the southeastern part of Borsod County.

=== His sons and their decline ===
Stephen Ákos had seven sons and two daughters from his wife, a certain Catherine from an unidentified noble family. All of his sons were adults by the early 14th century. The eldest son was Nicholas, who already participated in unlawful actions in the late 1290s and led troops against the Gutkeleds' landholdings in Borsod County in 1300. Nicholas was followed by his younger brothers in the following order: Stephen II, John ("the Devil"), James, Ladislaus, Gregory and Philip. Stephen also had two daughters. Anics (or Anyics) became the wife of Beke Borsa, the brother of powerful lords Roland and James Borsa, in 1300. The other unidentified daughter married to Desiderius Rátót, whose person connected the Ákos and Rátót clans to each other.

The wedding of Stephen's namesake son to a foreign princess in February 1303 was a national prestige event in the Kingdom of Hungary. According to Stephen's own document, issued on 26 February, "de gloriosissimo sanguine regis Bohemie et Polonie nobilem puellam filiam domini Bavarini ducis Bavarie magistro Stephano filio nostro ... matrimoniali federe fecit copulati". Many historians – e.g. Antal Pór, János Karácsonyi and Pál Engel – identified the bride as an unnamed Bavarian duchess from the House of Wittelsbach. Gyula Kristó wrote, the bride's father was a certain Bauarinus, a duke from Bavaria. According to historian Mór Wertner, however, the fiancée was the daughter of either Bavor II or his son Bavor III from the House of Strakonice, an influential Bohemian noble family. Bavor II married Agnes, an illegitimate child of Bohemian king Ottokar II. Thus Stephen Ákos became a relative of the Přemyslid dynasty through his son in those years, when he supported the throne aspirations of Wenceslaus. Veronika Rudolf considered that the fiancée was the daughter of Bavor III. The wedding, which took place in the manor house at Diósgyőr, was attended by a number of guests and dignitaries from many parts of the realm, including Amadeus Aba, Roland Rátót and Stephen's two sons-in-law, Beke Borsa and Desiderius Rátót.

By 1315, the elderly Stephen Ákos lost control and influence over his sons, who managed the large-scale Ákos properties by that time. According to side notes in some documents after 1313, his relationship at least with some of his sons became tense and furious. For instance, during a land donation to the Pauline monks, he forbade his (unidentified) sons and they appeared in the document's curse formula. Some contemporary royal documents, however, also called Stephen as "disloyal" along with his sons, but this could be a superficial information because of the short interval between his death and the outbreak of his sons' rebellion. Stephen Ákos died in 1315. His sons already rebelled in that year. Majority of the sources referred to them simply "Ákos sons", which makes it impossible to distinguish them and their fate. Based on the fragmented data, it seems the leading figure of their rebellion was John the Devil. Joining to Matthew Csák's army, they looted and ravaged Sárospatak. They also supported the revolt of the sons of the late Ladislaus Kán. Around 1319 and 1320, the Ákos dominion was completely destroyed and disintegrated by Charles' successful military campaigns, led by Dózsa Debreceni. The Ernye branch of the gens Ákos dropped out from the Hungarian nobility.

== Sources ==
- Engel, Pál (1996). Magyarország világi archontológiája, 1301–1457, I [Secular Archontology of Hungary, 1301–1457, Volume I] (in Hungarian). História, MTA Történettudományi Intézete. ISBN 963-8312-44-0.
- Kis, Péter (1998). "Ákos nembeli István". In Tusor, Péter (ed.). R. Várkonyi Ágnes emlékkönyv születésének 70. évfordulója ünnepére [A Memory Book for Ágnes R. Várkonyi to Commemorate the 70th Anniversary of Her Birth] (in Hungarian). Eötvös Loránd University. pp. 57–78. ISBN 963-4631-41-X.
- Kristó, Gyula (1979). A feudális széttagolódás Magyarországon [Feudal Anarchy in Hungary] (in Hungarian). Akadémiai Kiadó. ISBN 963-05-1595-4.
- Kristó, Gyula (1999). "I. Károly király főúri elitje (1301–1309) [The Aristocratic Elite of King Charles I, 1301–1309]". Századok (in Hungarian). 133 (1). Magyar Történelmi Társulat: 41–62. ISSN 0039-8098.
- Markó, László (2006). A magyar állam főméltóságai Szent Istvántól napjainkig: Életrajzi Lexikon [Great Officers of State in Hungary from King Saint Stephen to Our Days: A Biographical Encyclopedia] (in Hungarian). Helikon Kiadó. ISBN 963-208-970-7.
- Rudolf, Veronika (2023). Közép-Európa a hosszú 13. században [Central Europe in the Long 13th Century] (in Hungarian). Arpadiana XV., Research Centre for the Humanities. ISBN 978-963-416-406-7.
- Szűcs, Jenő (2002). Az utolsó Árpádok [The Last Árpáds] (in Hungarian). Osiris Kiadó. ISBN 963-389-271-6.
- Zsoldos, Attila (2011a). Magyarország világi archontológiája, 1000–1301 [Secular Archontology of Hungary, 1000–1301] (in Hungarian). História, MTA Történettudományi Intézete. ISBN 978-963-9627-38-3.
- Zsoldos, Attila (2011b). "III. András hat nádora [The Six Palatines of Andrew III]". In Cabello, Juan; C. Tóth, Norbert (eds.). Erősségénél fogva várépítésre való: Tanulmányok a 70 éves Németh Péter tiszteletére [It is Very Well Placed for a Castle: Studies for the 70-year-old Péter Németh] (in Hungarian). Szabolcs-Szatmár-Bereg Megyei Önkormányzat Múzeumok Igazgatósága. pp. 289–299. ISBN 978-963-7220-75-3.
- Zsoldos, Attila (2012). "Hűséges oligarchák [Loyal Oligarchs]". In Baráth, Magdolna; Molnár, Antal (eds.). A történettudomány szolgálatában: Tanulmányok a 70 éves Gecsényi Lajos tiszteletére (in Hungarian). Magyar Országos Levéltár. pp. 347–354. ISBN 978-963-7228-34-6.

Stephen I Genus Ákos Born: 1260s Died: 1315
Political offices
Preceded by Apor Péc	Judge royal 1298–1300	Vacant Title next held by John Csák
Preceded by Amadeus Aba	Palatine of Hungary alongside others 1301–1307	Succeeded by several others
