= Sajólád =

- Village
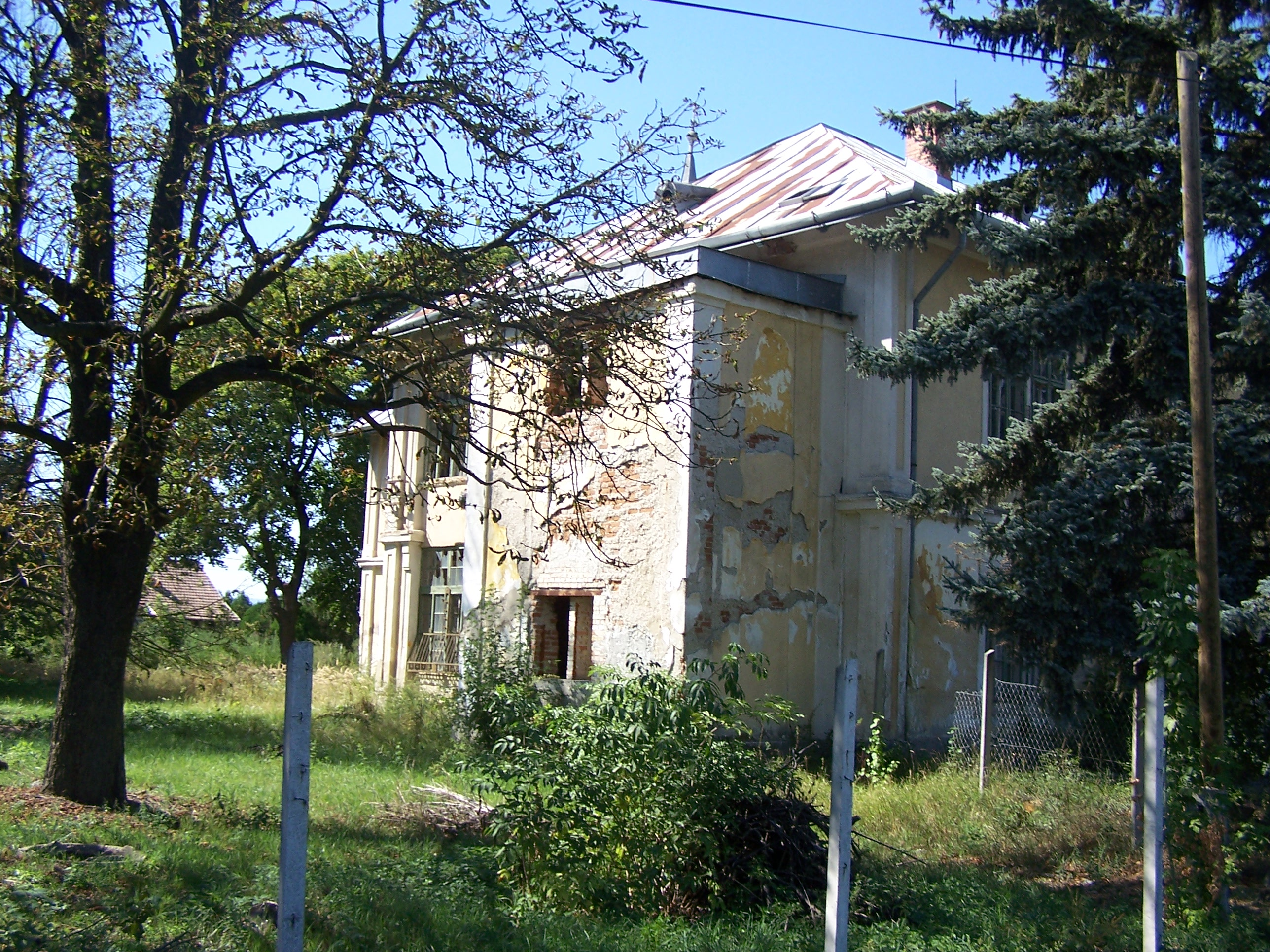

- Flag Coat of arms

- Location of Sajólád
- Coordinates: 48.04358°N 20.90297°E
- Country: Hungary
- Region: Northern Hungary
- County: Borsod-Abaúj-Zemplén
- District: Miskolc

Area
  - Total: 12.68 km^{2} (4.90 sq mi)

Population (1 January 2026)
  - Total: 2,842
  - Density: 224.1/km^{2} (580.5/sq mi)
- Time zone: UTC+1 (CET)
  - Summer (DST): UTC+2 (CEST)
- Postal code: 3572
- Area code: (+36) 46
- Website: www.sajolad.hu

Sajólád is a village in Borsod-Abaúj-Zemplén County in northeastern Hungary. It is located 11 km from the county's seat Miskolc.

== Geography ==
It is located along the Sajó River, its entire inhabited area and most of its administrative border extends to the other side of the river with a relatively large area (more than 5 square kilometers).

The directly bordering settlements are: Alsózsolca from the north, Hernádnémeti from the northeast, Bőcs on the east, Ónod from the south, Nyékládháza and Mályi from the south, and Sajópetri from the west.
