= Alsózsolca =

- Town
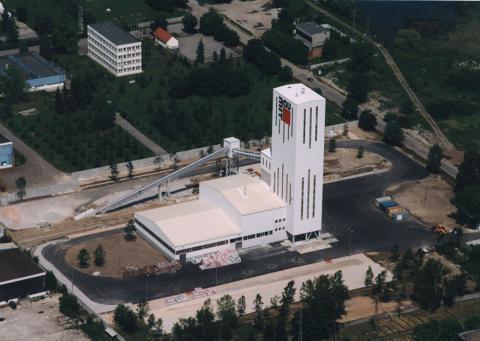
- Aerial view

- Flag Coat of arms

- Location of Borsod-Abaúj-Zemplén county in Hungary

- Location of Alsózsolca
- Coordinates: 48.07068°N 20.88018°E
- Country: Hungary
- County: Borsod-Abaúj-Zemplén
- District: Miskolc

Area
  - Total: 26.02 km^{2} (10.05 sq mi)

Population (2009)
  - Total: 6,044
  - Density: 232.28/km^{2} (601.6/sq mi)
- Time zone: UTC+1 (CET)
  - Summer (DST): UTC+2 (CEST)
- Postal code: 3571
- Area code: (+36) 46
- Website: www.alsozsolca.hu

Alsózsolca is a town in Borsod-Abaúj-Zemplén county, Hungary.

In the 19th and 20th centuries, a Jewish community lived in the village. In 1930, there were 75 Jews in the village. In 1944, all the city's Jews were sent to the Auschwitz extermination camp, most of whom were murdered in the Holocaust.

The village still has a Jewish cemetery.

== Geography ==
Alsózsolca is located in a low-lying area at the bank of Sajó river. The village has roads leading to Sajólád in the south, to Felsőzsolca due north, as well as towards Onga going north-east. The area has artificial lakes created from abandoned mines.
