= Répáshuta =

Répáshuta Repašská Huta (in Slovak)
- Village
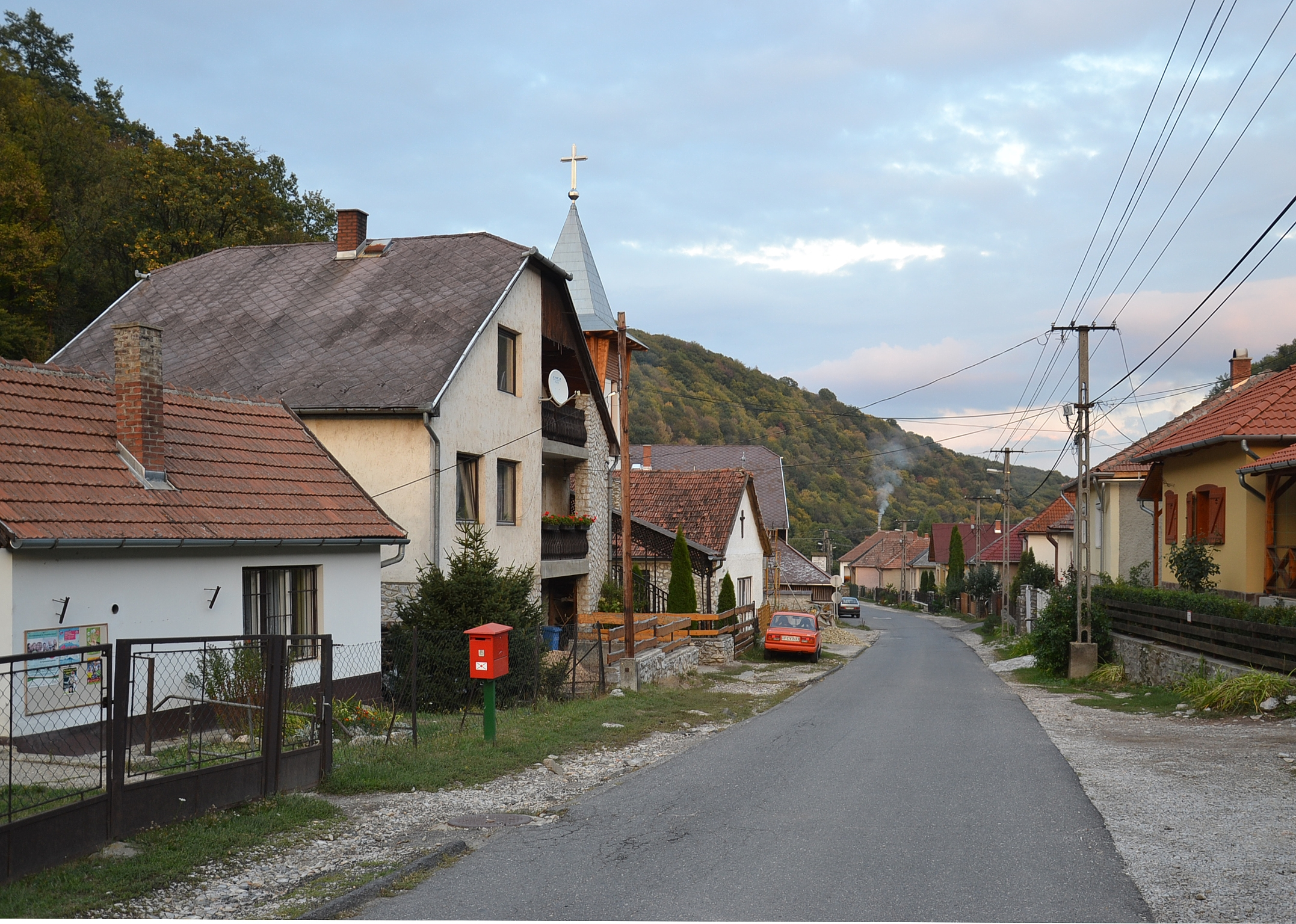

- Flag Coat of arms

- Location of Répáshuta
- Coordinates: 48.04875°N 20.528169°E
- Country: Hungary
- Region: Northern Hungary
- County: Borsod-Abaúj-Zemplén
- District: Miskolc

Area
  - Total: 16.79 km^{2} (6.48 sq mi)

Population (1 January 2025)
  - Total: 438
  - Density: 26.1/km^{2} (67.6/sq mi)
- Time zone: UTC+1 (CET)
  - Summer (DST): UTC+2 (CEST)
- Postal code: 3559
- Area code: (+36) 46
- Website: www.repashuta.hu

Répáshuta is a village in Borsod-Abaúj-Zemplén County in northeastern Hungary.
