= Gesztely =

- Village
- Flag Coat of arms

- Location of Gesztely
- Coordinates: 48.10571°N 20.96301°E
- Country: Hungary
- Region: Northern Hungary
- County: Borsod-Abaúj-Zemplén
- District: Miskolc

Area
  - Total: 28.82 km^{2} (11.13 sq mi)

Population (1 January 2025)
  - Total: 2,628
  - Density: 91.19/km^{2} (236.2/sq mi)
- Time zone: UTC+1 (CET)
  - Summer (DST): UTC+2 (CEST)
- Postal code: 3715
- Area code: (+36) 46
- Website: gesztely.hu

Gesztely is a village in Borsod-Abaúj-Zemplén county, Hungary.
