= Harsány =

- Village
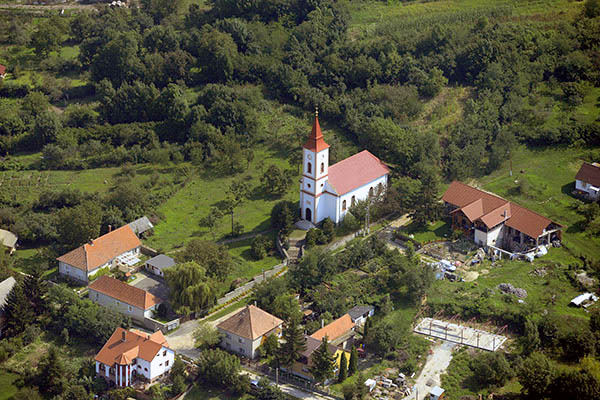

- Flag Coat of arms

- Location of Harsány
- Coordinates: 47.96985°N 20.74051°E
- Country: Hungary
- Region: Northern Hungary
- County: Borsod-Abaúj-Zemplén
- District: Miskolc

Area
  - Total: 36.54 km^{2} (14.11 sq mi)

Population (1 January 2025)
  - Total: 1,877
  - Density: 51.37/km^{2} (133.0/sq mi)
- Time zone: UTC+1 (CET)
  - Summer (DST): UTC+2 (CEST)
- Postal code: 3555
- Area code: (+36) 46
- Website: www.harsany.hu

Harsány is a village in Borsod-Abaúj-Zemplén County in northeastern Hungary.
