= Hernádkak =

- Village
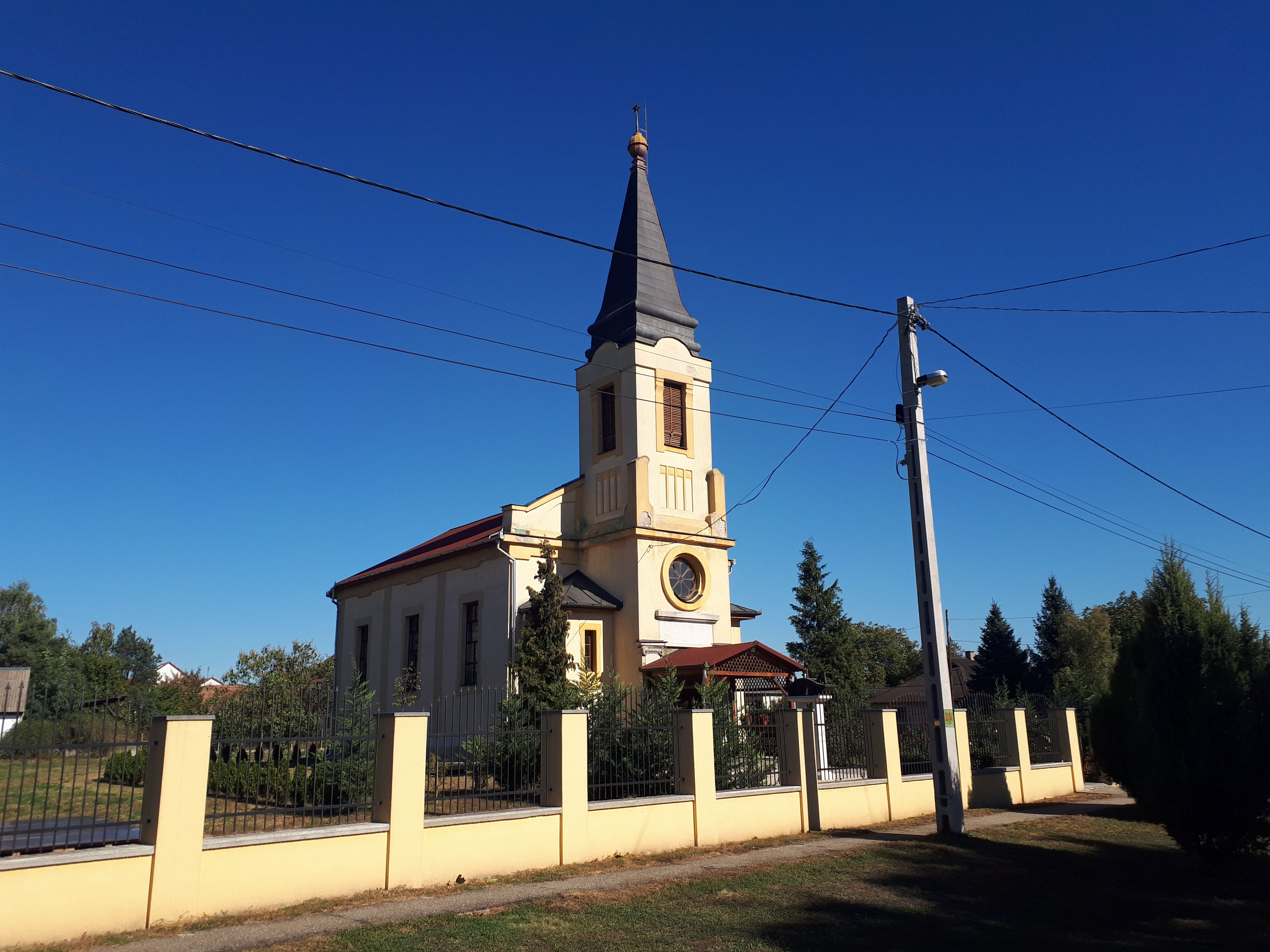

- Flag Coat of arms

- Location of Hernádkak
- Coordinates: 48.09252°N 20.96078°E
- Country: Hungary
- Region: Northern Hungary
- County: Borsod-Abaúj-Zemplén
- District: Miskolc

Area
  - Total: 10.9 km^{2} (4.2 sq mi)

Population (1 January 2025)
  - Total: 1,514
  - Density: 139/km^{2} (360/sq mi)
- Time zone: UTC+1 (CET)
  - Summer (DST): UTC+2 (CEST)
- Postal code: 3563
- Area code: (+36) 46
- Website: hernadkak.hu

Hernádkak is a village in Borsod-Abaúj-Zemplén County in northeastern Hungary.
