= Kistokaj =

- Village
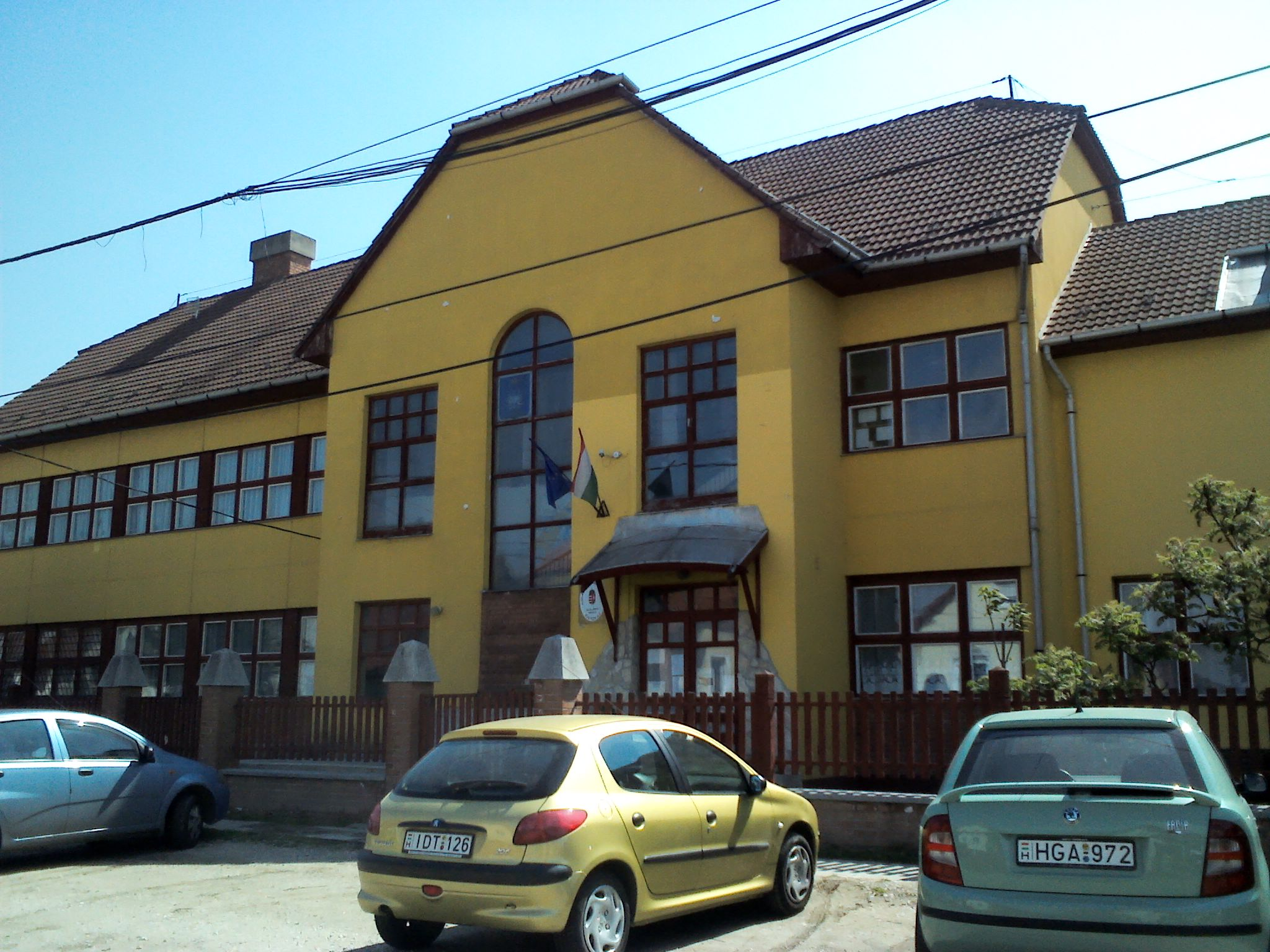

- Flag Coat of arms

- Location of Kistokaj
- Coordinates: 48.04200°N 20.83950°E
- Country: Hungary
- Region: Northern Hungary
- County: Borsod-Abaúj-Zemplén
- District: Miskolc

Area
  - Total: 9.75 km^{2} (3.76 sq mi)

Population (1 January 2026)
  - Total: 2,419
  - Density: 248/km^{2} (643/sq mi)
- Time zone: UTC+1 (CET)
  - Summer (DST): UTC+2 (CEST)
- Postal code: 3553
- Area code: (+36) 46
- Website: www.kistokaj.hu

Kistokaj is a village in Borsod-Abaúj-Zemplén county, Hungary.
