= Sajóhídvég =

- Village
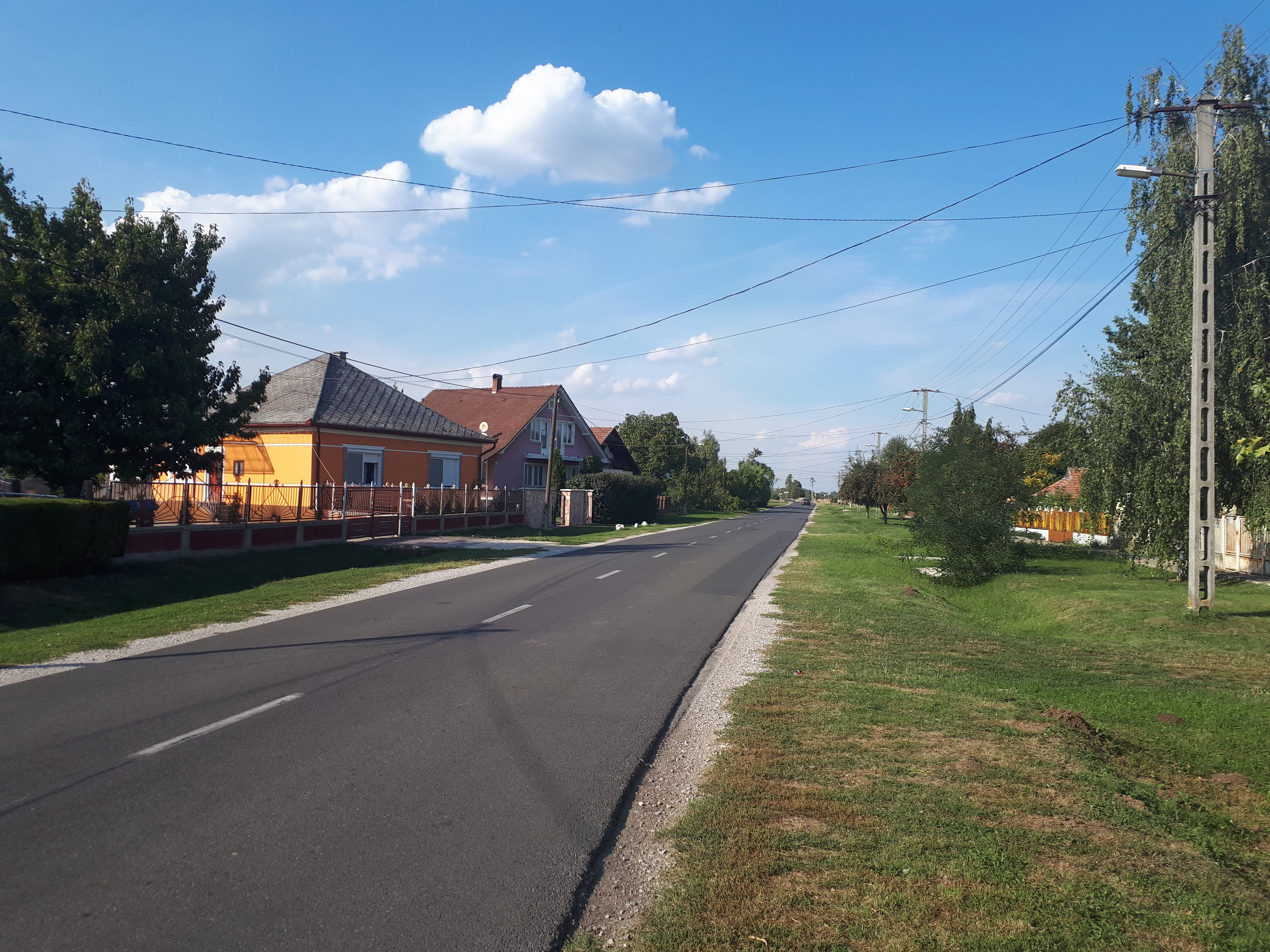

- Flag Coat of arms

- Location of Sajóhídvég
- Coordinates: 48.0042°N 20.9505°E
- Country: Hungary
- Region: Northern Hungary
- County: Borsod-Abaúj-Zemplén
- District: Miskolc

Area
  - Total: 13.45 km^{2} (5.19 sq mi)

Population (1 January 2025)
  - Total: 1,026
  - Density: 76.28/km^{2} (197.6/sq mi)
- Time zone: UTC+1 (CET)
  - Summer (DST): UTC+2 (CEST)
- Postal code: 3576
- Area code: (+36) 49
- Website: sajohidveg.hu

Sajóhídvég is a village in Borsod-Abaúj-Zemplén County in north-eastern Hungary.
