= Radostyán =

Coordinates: 48°11′N 20°40′E

- Village
- Interactive map of Radostyán
- Country: Hungary
- Regions: Northern Hungary
- County: Borsod-Abaúj-Zemplén County
- Time zone: UTC+1 (CET)
  - Summer (DST): UTC+2 (CEST)

Radostyán is a village in Borsod-Abaúj-Zemplén County in northeastern Hungary.

== Etymology ==
The name comes from Slavic/Slovak Hradišťany: "the people who belong to the castle" (hradište) → Radostyán.
