= Berzék =

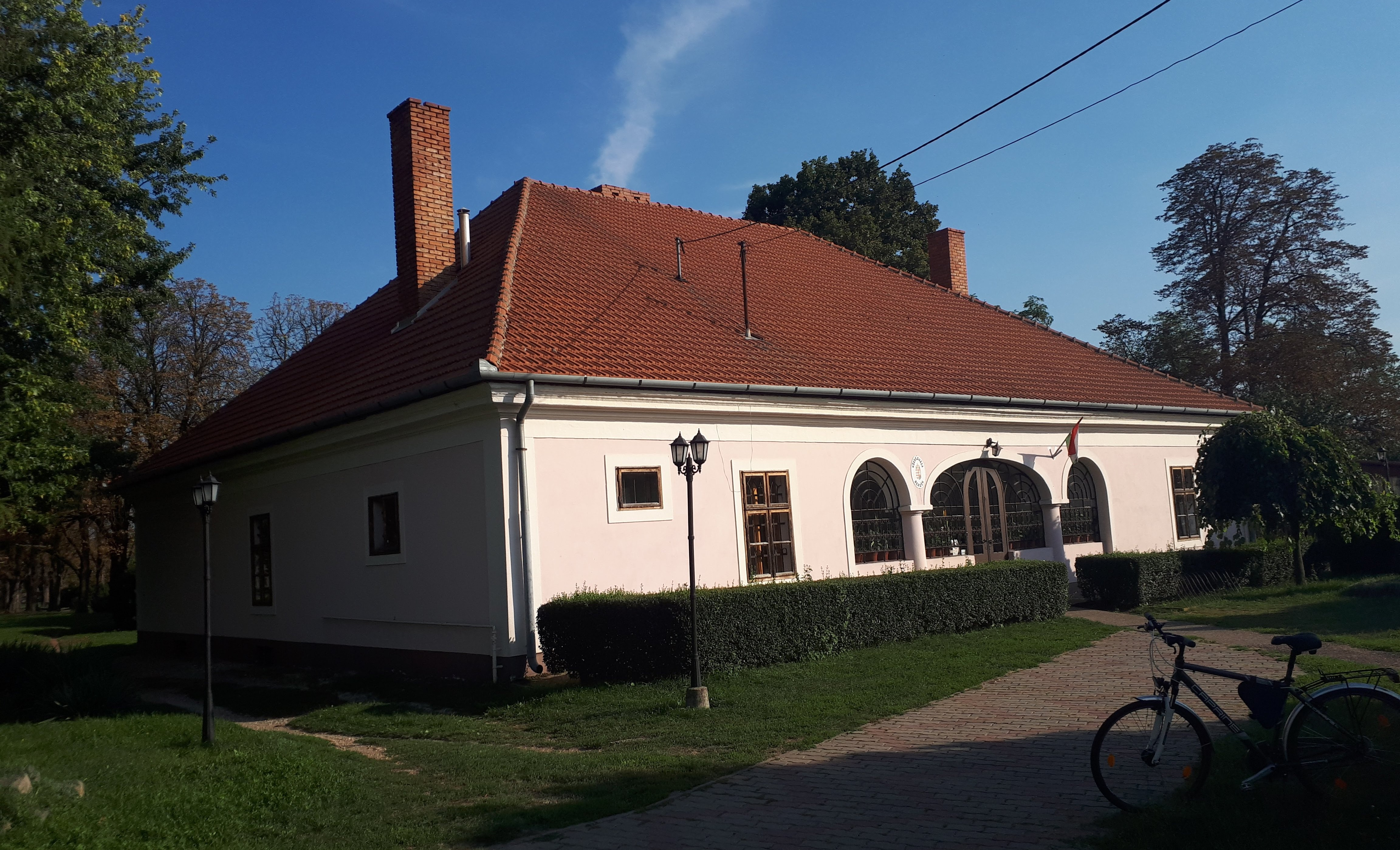
- Village hall

- Coat of arms

- Location of Borsod-Abaúj-Zemplén county in Hungary

- Location of Berzék
- Coordinates: 48.02439°N 20.95307°E
- Country: Hungary
- County: Borsod-Abaúj-Zemplén

Area
  - Total: 10.6 km^{2} (4.1 sq mi)

Population (2004)
  - Total: 1,044
  - Density: 98.49/km^{2} (255.1/sq mi)
- Time zone: UTC+1 (CET)
  - Summer (DST): UTC+2 (CEST)
- Postal code: 3575
- Area code: 46

Berzék is a village in Borsod-Abaúj-Zemplén county, Hungary.
