= Varbó =

- Village
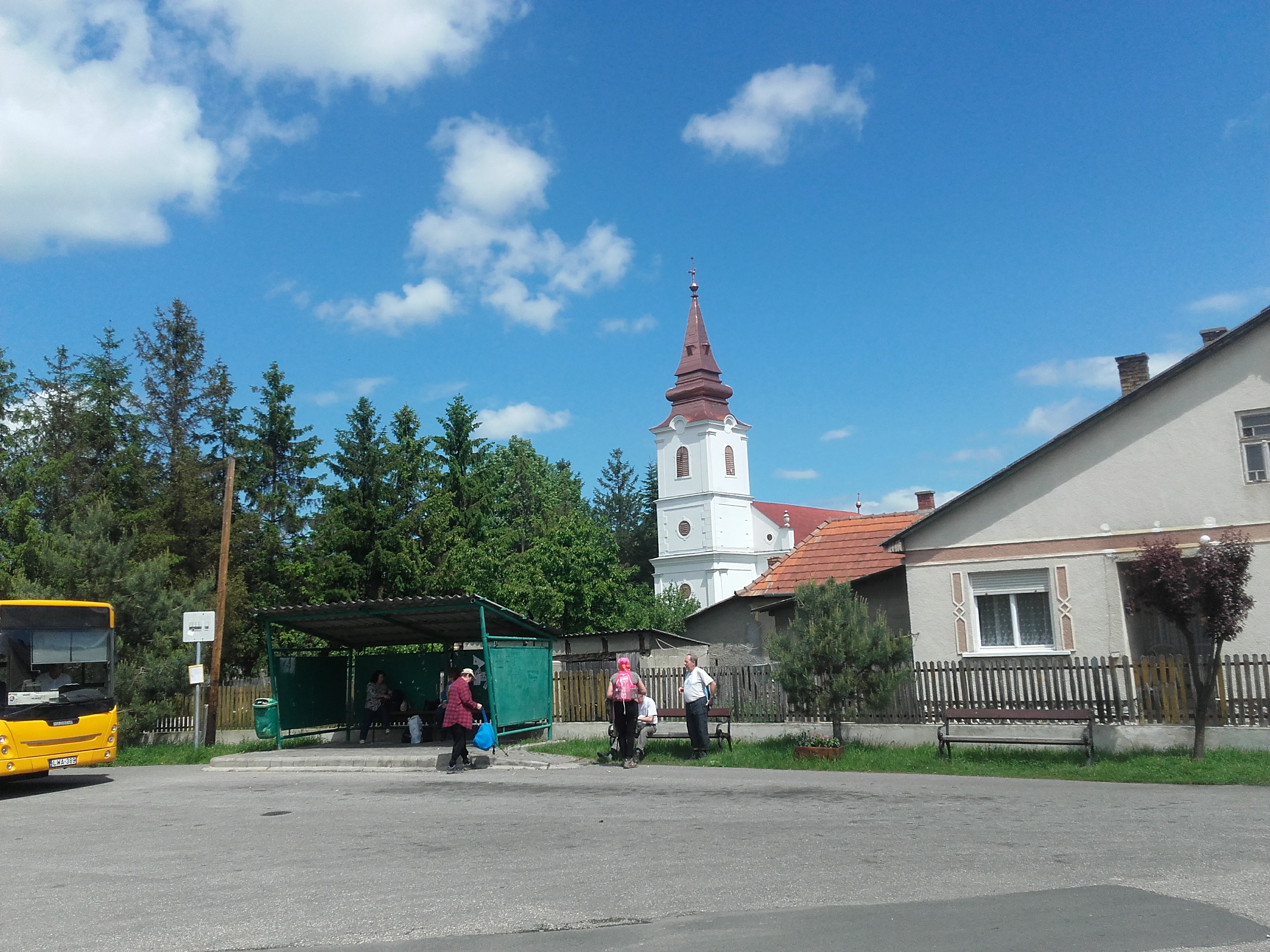
- The main square of Varbó with a local church and bus stop

- Flag Coat of arms

- Location of Varbó
- Coordinates: 48.16138°N 20.61814°E
- Country: Hungary
- Region: Northern Hungary
- County: Borsod-Abaúj-Zemplén
- District: Miskolc

Area
  - Total: 25.8 km^{2} (10.0 sq mi)

Population (1 January 2026)
  - Total: 1,020
  - Density: 39.5/km^{2} (102/sq mi)
- Time zone: UTC+1 (CET)
  - Summer (DST): UTC+2 (CEST)
- Postal code: 3778
- Area code: (+36) 48
- Website: www.varbo.hu

Varbó is a village in Borsod-Abaúj-Zemplén County in northeastern Hungary.

== Etymology ==
Slavic Vrbov or Vrbové → Varbó. Vŕba - willow. 1303/1352/1449/1450 poss. Warbo. See e.g. Vrbové (Slovakia).
