= Köröm =

Coordinates: 47°59′N 20°57′E

- Village
- Interactive map of Köröm
- Country: Hungary
- Regions: Northern Hungary
- County: Borsod-Abaúj-Zemplén County
- Time zone: UTC+1 (CET)
  - Summer (DST): UTC+2 (CEST)

Köröm is a village in Borsod-Abaúj-Zemplén County in northeastern Hungary.
