= Bükkaranyos =

- Village
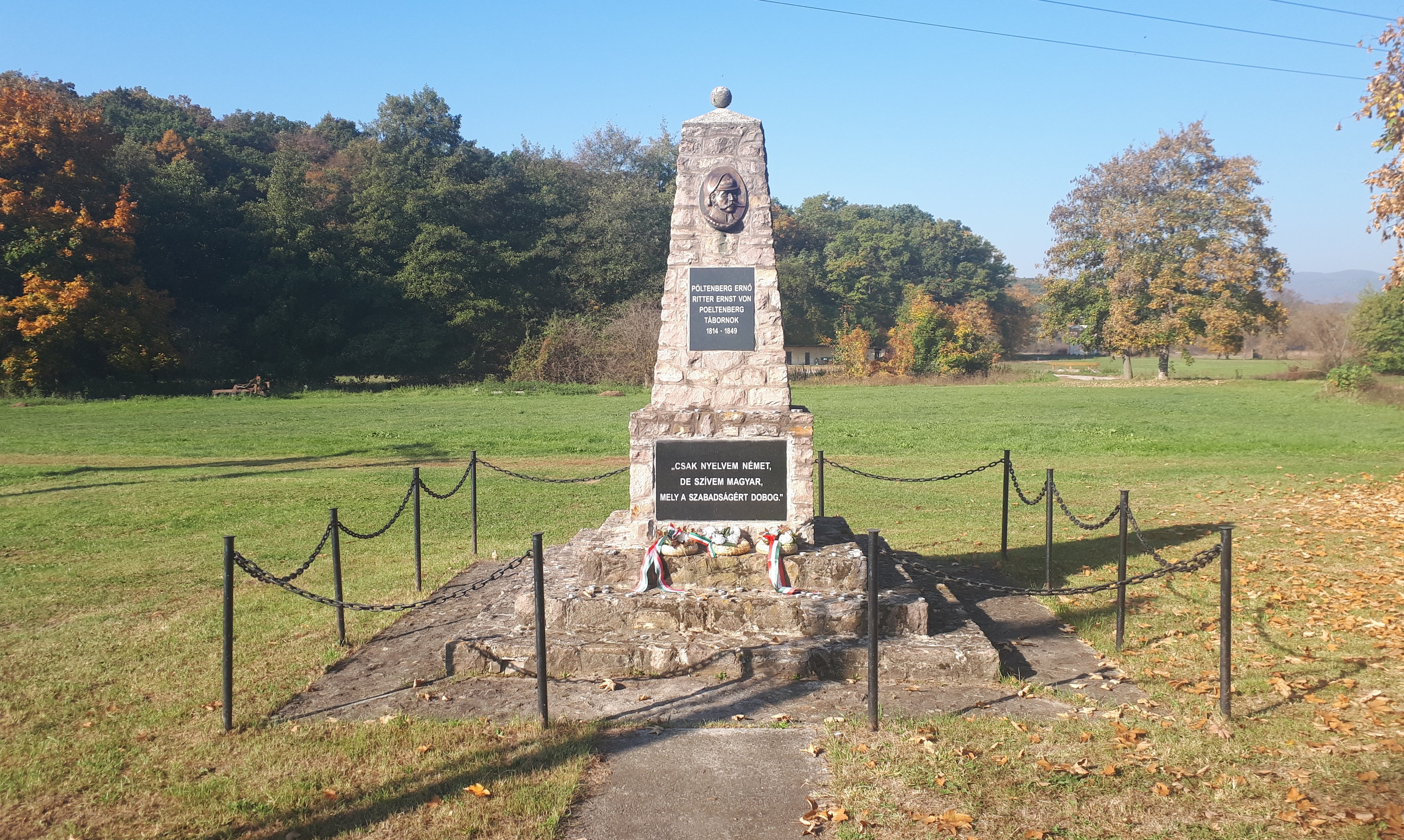

- Flag Coat of arms

- Location of Bükkaranyos
- Coordinates: 47.98549°N 20.78053°E
- Country: Hungary
- Region: Northern Hungary
- County: Borsod-Abaúj-Zemplén
- District: Miskolc

Area
  - Total: 26.19 km^{2} (10.11 sq mi)

Population (1 January 2025)
  - Total: 1,505
  - Density: 57.46/km^{2} (148.8/sq mi)
- Time zone: UTC+1 (CET)
  - Summer (DST): UTC+2 (CEST)
- Postal code: 3554
- Area code: (+36) 46
- Website: www.bukkaranyos.hu

Bükkaranyos is a village in Borsod-Abaúj-Zemplén county, Hungary.
