= Kondó =

- Village
- Flag Coat of arms

- Location of Kondó
- Coordinates: 48.18943°N 20.64043°E
- Country: Hungary
- Region: Northern Hungary
- County: Borsod-Abaúj-Zemplén
- District: Miskolc

Area
  - Total: 19.62 km^{2} (7.58 sq mi)

Population (1 January 2026)
  - Total: 468
  - Density: 23.9/km^{2} (61.8/sq mi)
- Time zone: UTC+1 (CET)
  - Summer (DST): UTC+2 (CEST)
- Postal code: 3775
- Area code: (+36) 48
- Website: www.kondo.hu

Kondó is a village in Borsod-Abaúj-Zemplén County in northeastern Hungary.
