= Sajóecseg =

- Village
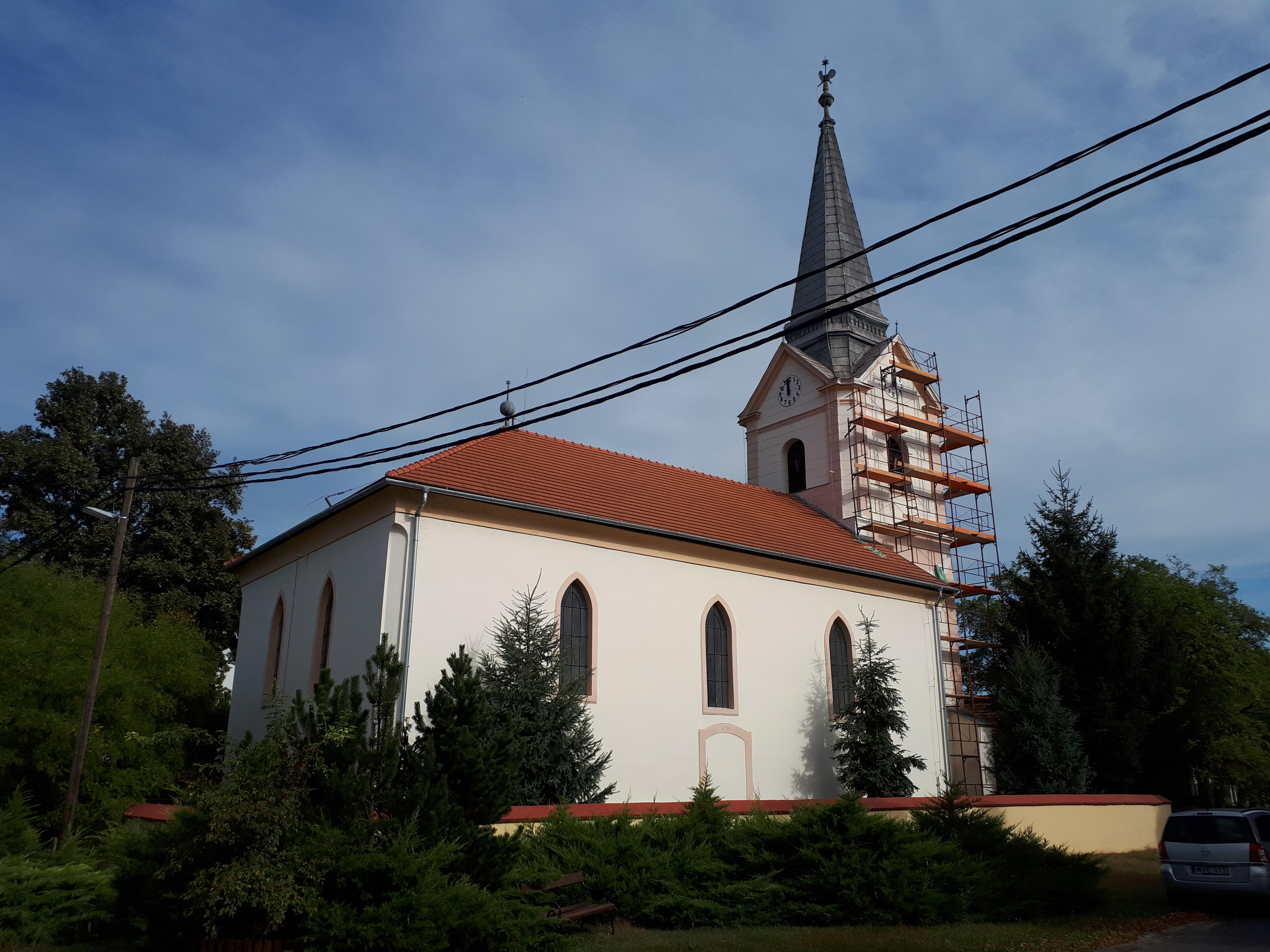

- Flag Coat of arms

- Location of Sajóecseg
- Coordinates: 48.19191°N 20.77476°E
- Country: Hungary
- Region: Northern Hungary
- County: Borsod-Abaúj-Zemplén
- District: Miskolc

Area
  - Total: 7.94 km^{2} (3.07 sq mi)

Population (1 January 2025)
  - Total: 984
  - Density: 124/km^{2} (321/sq mi)
- Time zone: UTC+1 (CET)
  - Summer (DST): UTC+2 (CEST)
- Postal code: 3793
- Area code: (+36) 46
- Website: www.sajoecseg.hu

Sajóecseg is a village in Borsod-Abaúj-Zemplén County in northeastern Hungary.
