= Onga, Hungary =

Onga
- Town
- Flag Coat of arms

- Location of Borsod-Abaúj-Zemplén county in Hungary

- Location of Onga, Hungary
- Coordinates: 48.11899°N 20.90735°E
- Country: Hungary
- County: Borsod-Abaúj-Zemplén
- District: Miskolc

Area
  - Total: 31.49 km^{2} (12.16 sq mi)

Population (2015.jan.1.)
  - Total: 4,746
  - Density: 151.63/km^{2} (392.7/sq mi)
- Time zone: UTC+1 (CET)
  - Summer (DST): UTC+2 (CEST)
- Postal code: 3562
- Area code: (+36) 46
- Website: www.onga.hu

Onga is a town in Borsod-Abaúj-Zemplén County, Hungary. 10 km to Miskolc.

== History ==
The area has been inhabited since prehistoric times, this Bronze Age artifacts attest. 1222 was first mentioned. In 1588 the Turks burned, but quickly built up again. The village suffered a lot during the Turkish period and the Rákóczi War of Independence, the 18th century began to grow again. The population lived mainly in farming.

In the 19th century, the development has accelerated, thanks to the railways and county seat closeness. Increase in the number of industrial workers. The development accelerated after the Second World War. Ócsanálos village attached to Onga, in 1950.

June 4, 2011, inauguration of the township's runic-name plate.

The settlement received a city title on the 15th of July 2013, the proposal of the Minister of Public Administration and Justice.

== Ethnic groups ==
The town's population, 83% of Hungarian and 17% of Roma.

== Population ==
Historical population
| Year | Pop. | ±% |
|---|---|---|
| 2013 | 4,857 | — |
| 2014 | 4,778 | −1.6% |
| 2015 | 4,746 | −0.7% |
