= Ónod =

Coordinates: 48°00′N 20°55′E

- Village
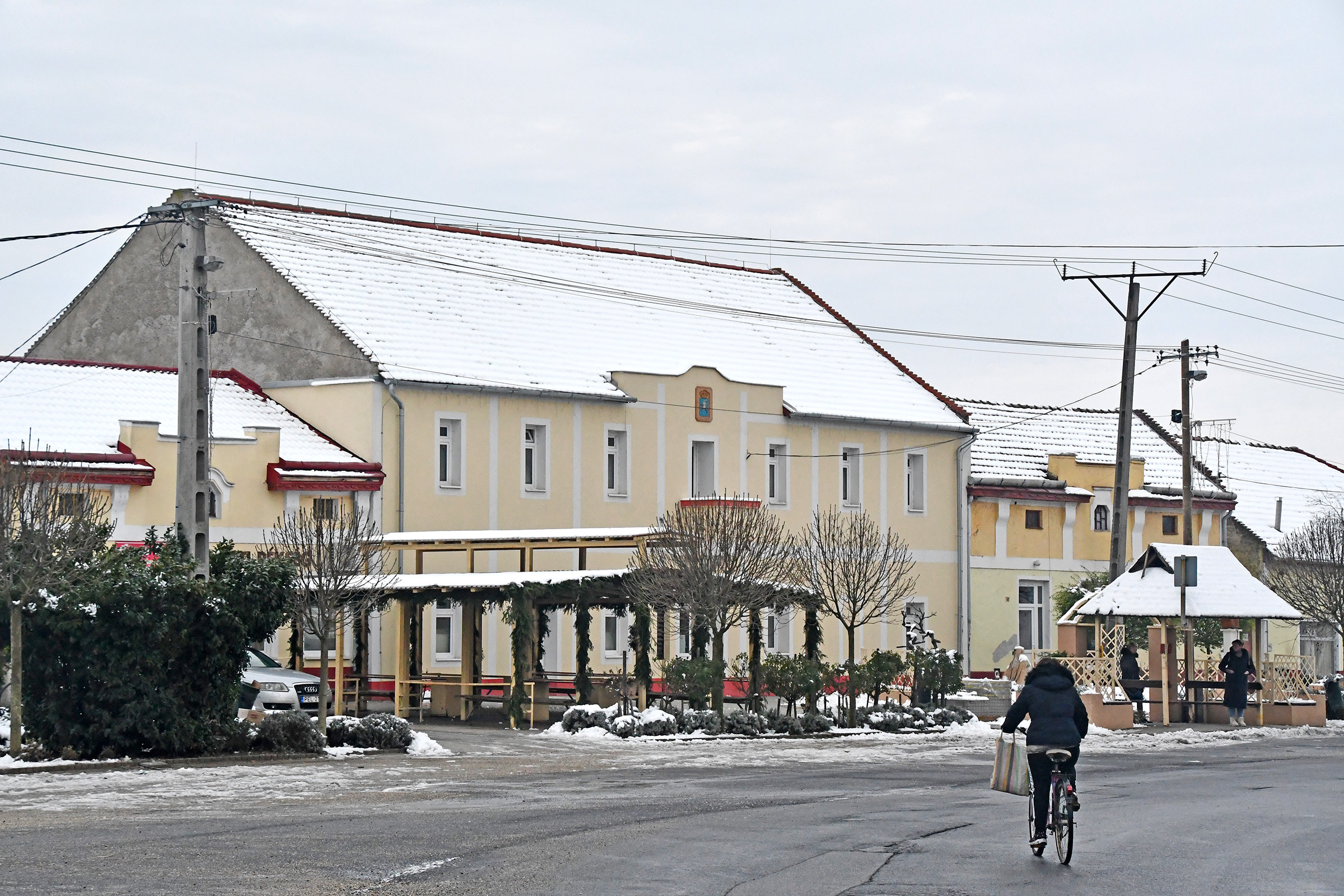
- Village hall
- Interactive map of Ónod
- Country: Hungary
- Regions: Northern Hungary
- County: Borsod-Abaúj-Zemplén County
- Time zone: UTC+1 (CET)
  - Summer (DST): UTC+2 (CEST)

Ónod is a village in Borsod-Abaúj-Zemplén County in northeastern Hungary. There are around 2,000 people living there. Ónod has a long history reflected by some of the older buildings in the town, including the castle and the post carriage stopping point.

== Gallery ==
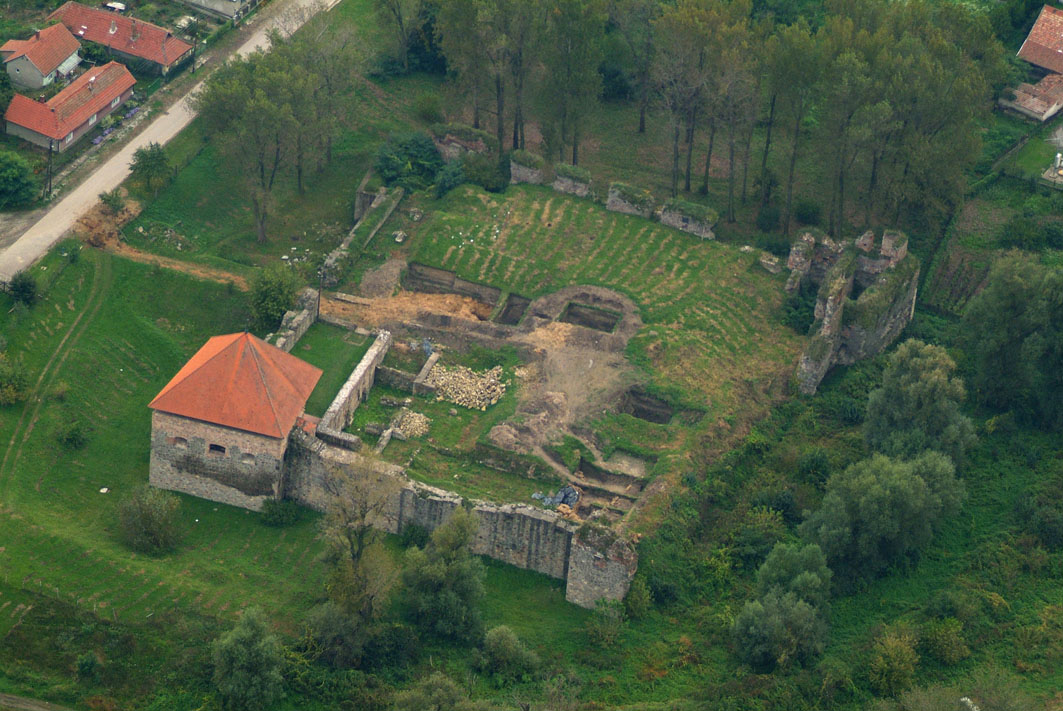

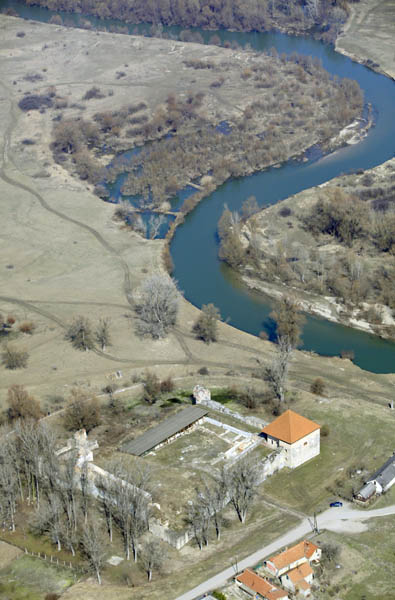

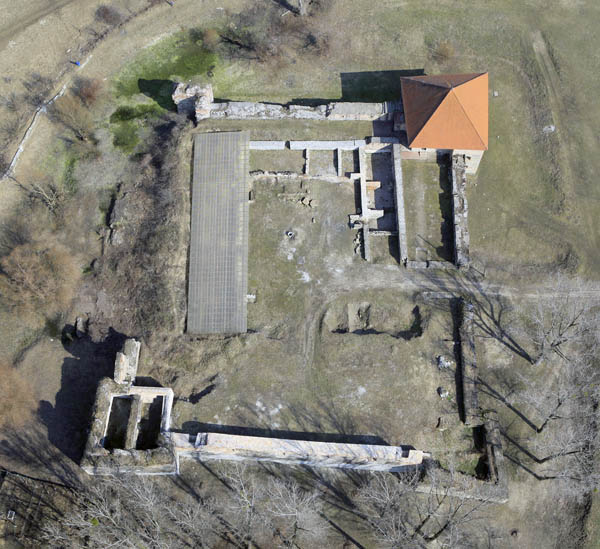

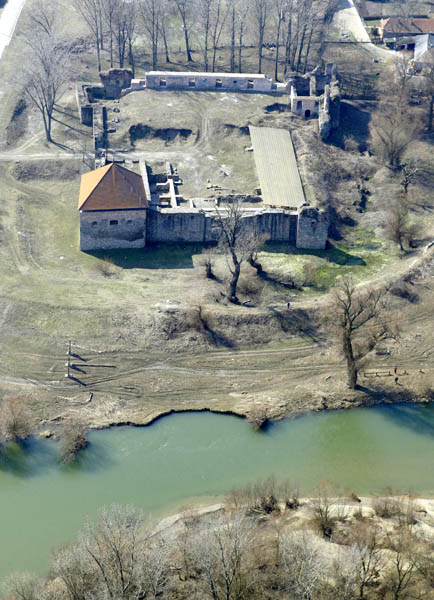
