= Hernádnémeti =

- Large village
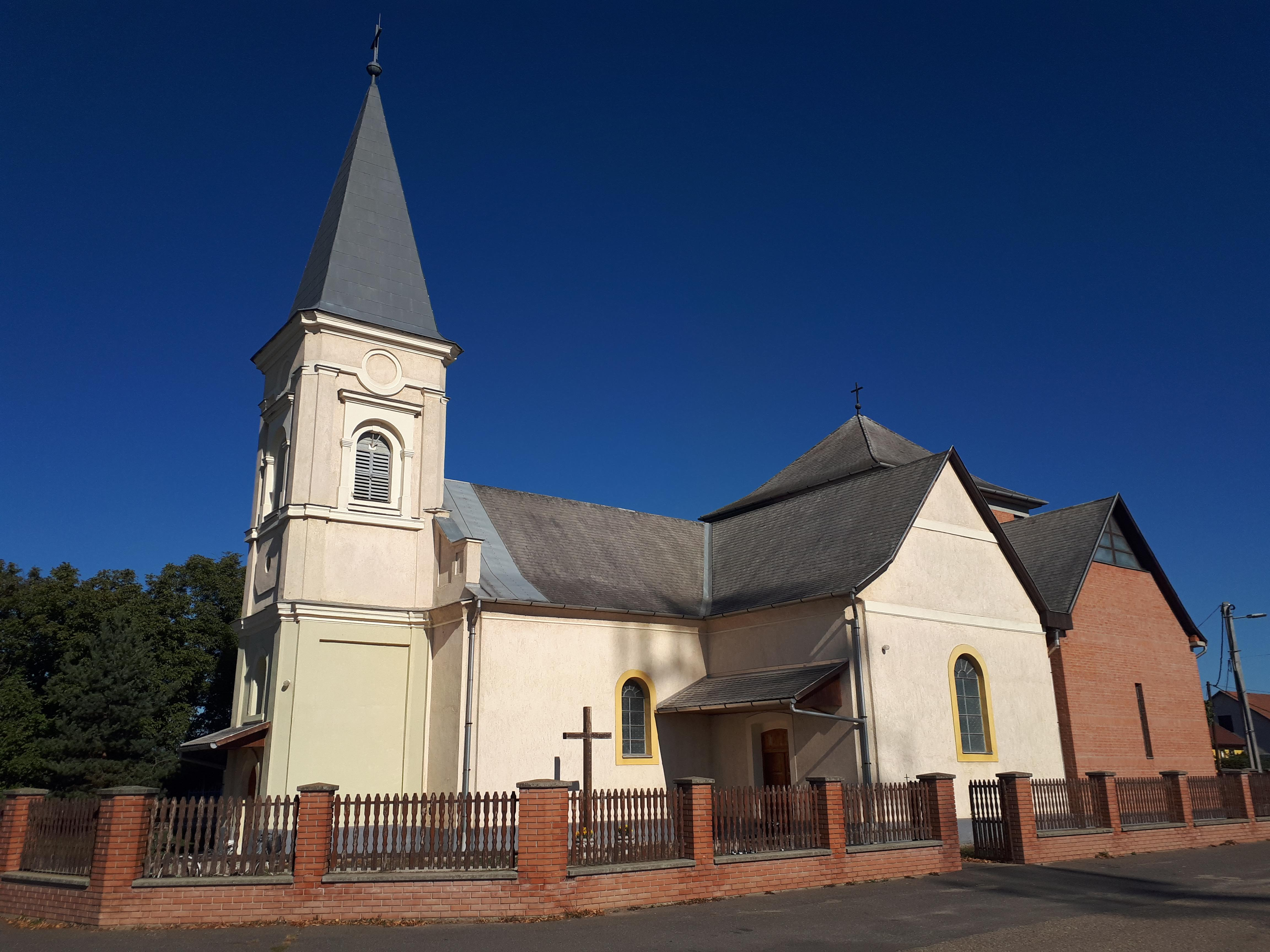

- Flag Coat of arms

- Location of Hernádnémeti
- Coordinates: 48.07948°N 20.97236°E
- Country: Hungary
- Region: Northern Hungary
- County: Borsod-Abaúj-Zemplén
- District: Miskolc

Area
  - Total: 28.76 km^{2} (11.10 sq mi)

Population (1 January 2025)
  - Total: 3,464
  - Density: 120.4/km^{2} (312.0/sq mi)
- Time zone: UTC+1 (CET)
  - Summer (DST): UTC+2 (CEST)
- Postal code: 3564
- Area code: (+36) 46
- Website: www.hernadnemeti.hu

Hernádnémeti is a village in Borsod-Abaúj-Zemplén County in northeastern Hungary. It is situated on the left bank of the Hernád River, 14 kilometres (8.7 mi) from Miskolc. The village is 120 metres (390 ft) above sea level. It can be reached by car via highway 37 or by train from the Hernádnémeti–Bőcs train station, which is located in the neighboring village of Bőcs.

== History ==
The village was originally settled in the times of Prince Árpád. During the Mongol invasion it was completely depopulated; it was resettled in 1254 by Germans who were invited to the country by the king. From these German settlers the village gets its name (német being the word in Hungarian for German).

The village was again destroyed during the Turkish invasions; in 1567 the area is referred to as being unpopulated. Gradually it was repopulated and in 1596 it was included into the Rákóczi estates. At this time the village became Protestant due to an influx of hajduk settlers.
