= Mályi =

Coordinates: 48°01′N 20°50′E

- Village
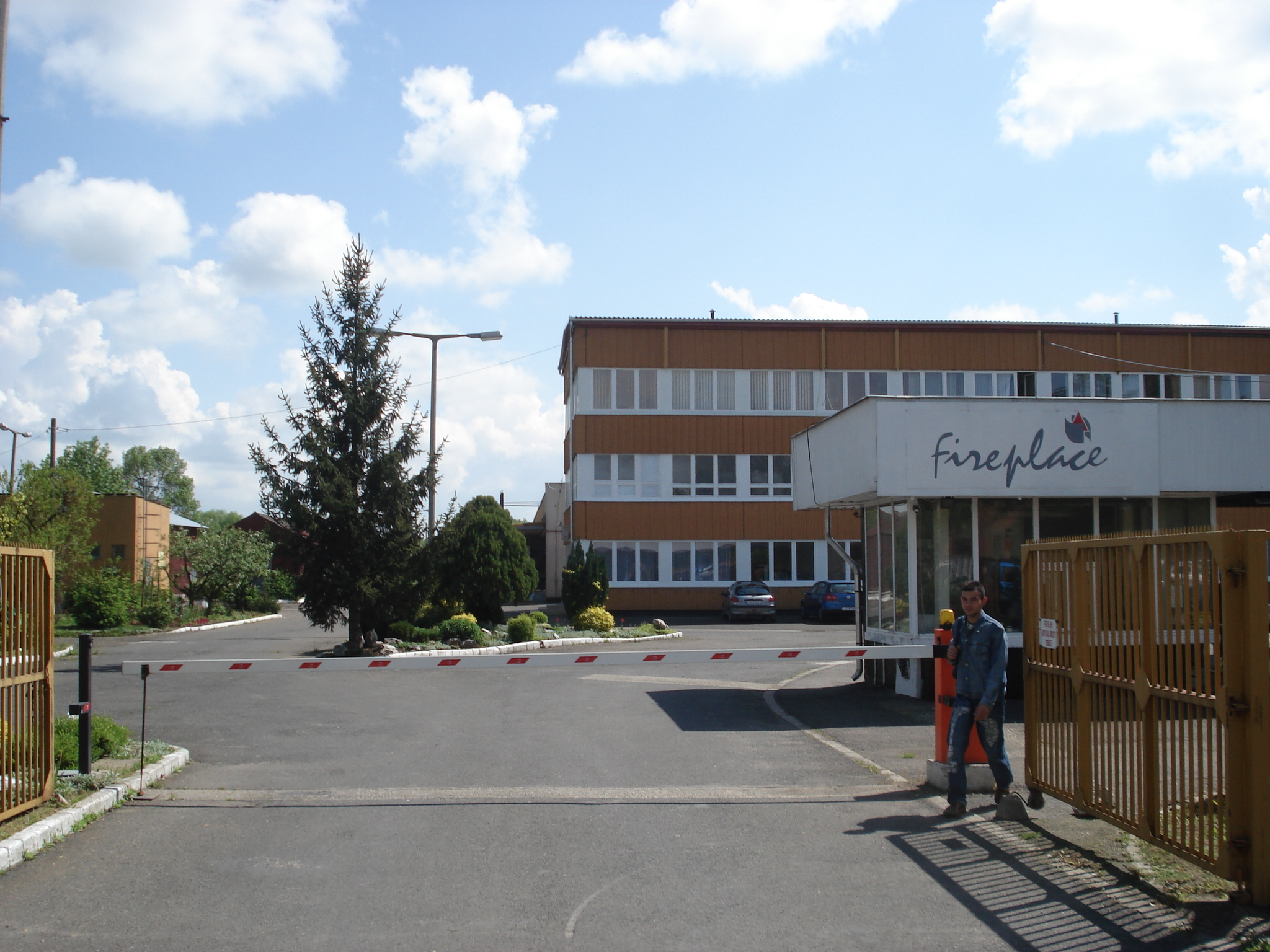
- Entrance to fireplace

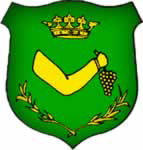
- Seal
- Interactive map of Mályi
- Country: Hungary
- Regions: Northern Hungary
- County: Borsod-Abaúj-Zemplén County
- Time zone: UTC+1 (CET)
  - Summer (DST): UTC+2 (CEST)

Mályi is a village in Borsod-Abaúj-Zemplén County in northeastern Hungary.
