= Felsőzsolca =

- Town
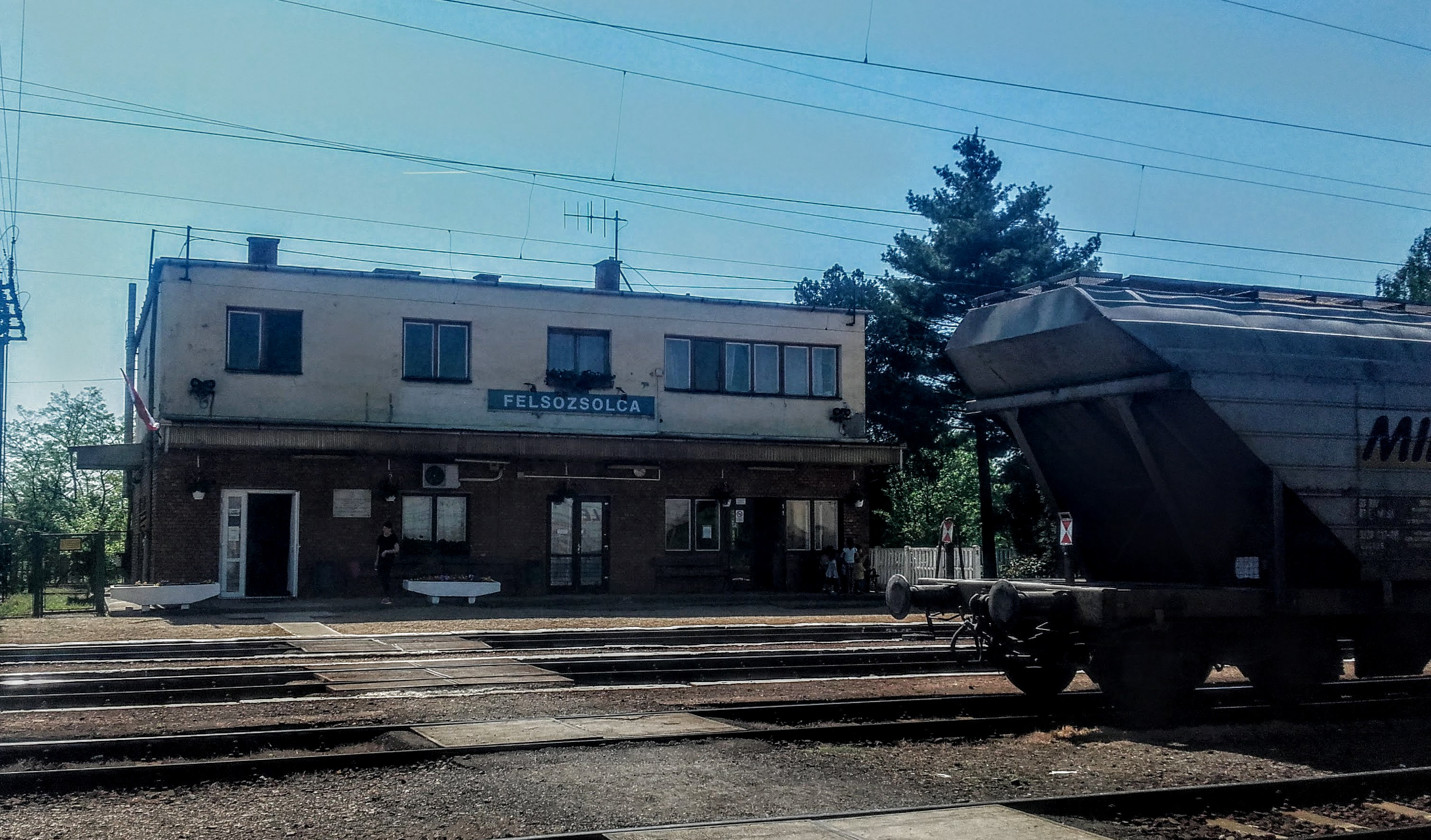
- Felsőzsolca railway station

- Coat of arms

- Location of Felsőzsolca
- Coordinates: 48.10872°N 20.85557°E
- Country: Hungary
- County: Borsod-Abaúj-Zemplén
- District: Miskolc

Area
  - Total: 16.24 km^{2} (6.27 sq mi)

Population (2001)
  - Total: 7,120
  - Density: 440.27/km^{2} (1,140.3/sq mi)
- Time zone: UTC+1 (CET)
  - Summer (DST): UTC+2 (CEST)
- Postal code: 3561
- Area code: (+36) 46
- Website: www.felsozsolca.hu

Felsőzsolca is a small town in Borsod-Abaúj-Zemplén county, in northern Hungary, in the Miskolc agglomeration. It is the city with the tenth highest population in Borsod-Abaúj-Zemplén county and the second biggest in the Miskolc agglomeration.

== Location ==
Felsőzsolca is situated next to Miskolc, 1 km (1 mi) from the outskirts of Miskolc (the centres of the two cities are about 6 km (4 mi) from each other). The town is situated at the eastern tip of the Bükk Mountain, on the left bank of the river Sajó, and in the Borsod region bordered by the eastern side of Abaúj. The topography is flat, mildly hilly.

== Transport ==
It is accessible by roads 3 and 37, by train on the Budapest-Miskolc-Sátoraljaújhely line, and on the Miskolc-Hidasnémeti line. The railway station is 3 km (2 mi) from the town.

Public transit for Felsőzsolca is provided by the neighboring Transport Company of Miskolc, (MVK Zrt.) Now, one bus service, line 7, serves the citizens. Besides this, several coach services travel through the town on Szent István street, and on Kassai street.

== Geographical connections ==
- Northeast: valley of river Hernád, Szikszó
- North: hills of Cserehát
- Northwest: Sajószentpéter, Kazincbarcika, Edelény towns
- West: Bükk Mountain, Miskolc centre of the county
- South: valley of river Sajó, Tisza, Tiszaújváros, Polgár, Debrecen towns
- East: underneath of Tokaj Mountain, Taktaköz, Szerencs, Tokaj towns

== Climate ==
Complexion: continental temperature, min-max.: -25 °C till +35 °C, annual average temperature is 11 °C

== Hydrogeology ==
Next to the town, on the western side is the river Sajó and its tributary stream, Little-Bódva (Little-Sajó as others call it). There was a lake, called Pond Priest, between Miskolc and Felsőzsolca that has a legend associated with it. According to the legend, a church had sunk into the pond. The pond was pumped out in 2008, and the area has been built on. In June 2010 a historic flood hit Felsőzsolca. Out of a total of 2200, about 1800 houses were damaged, and over 200 houses collapsed. The restoration is in progress now.

== History ==
The area has been inhabited since Neolithic times. The town was first mentioned in 1281 in a document about territory disputed between Zsolca and Miskolc. The document states that the border of the two towns shall always remain the river Sajó.

In the Middle Ages Zsolca had been a prospering village until occupying Turks destroyed it. The village suffered significantly again during the revolution against the Habsburgs in 1848–49 when Russian forces (allies of the Habsburgs) burned it down. In 1867 a monument was erected commemorating the Battle of Zsolca which made the village the second place in the country where a monument for the revolution was erected.

During the 20th century, the county became an important industrial area, the population of Felsőzsolca was growing rapidly due to its proximity to Miskolc. By 1980 it had more than 7,000 residents and in 1997 it was granted “city” status.

Unlike many villages in the area, Felsőzsolca managed to avoid being annexed by Miskolc mostly because of the river Sajó which acts as a natural border between them. The two cities exist in symbiosis. Despite being a sovereign city outside the boundaries of Miskolc, Felsőzsolca is directly connected to Miskolc by the bus lines of MVK Zrt., (the official Miskolc mass transport company).

Before World War II, there was a Jewish community in Felsőzsolca. At its height, there were 82 Jews in the community most of them were murdered by the Nazis in the Holocaust.

== Ethnical groups ==
91% of the population has Hungarian nationality, and 9% of the inhabitants have Roma nationality. Out of this, the Bulgarian and Polish minority also live in Felsőzsolca.

== Sights ==
- Anglican Church, built in 1851.
- Roman Catholic Church. It was built in 1900 to honour Keresztelő Szent János.
- Castle of the Bárczay family, restored in 2001.
- Museum and library within the castle.
- Monument of the Trianon. Garlands are placed every year to commemorate June 4, 1920.
- Wind-power station near Felsőzsolca that was built in 2006 and is called Cervantes.
- A motocross field existed between Miskolc and Felsőzsolca, which was destroyed in 2008. The site now has been taken over to construction.
- Felsőzsolca Városi Sportcsarnok

== Twin towns ==
- Draganovo, Bulgaria
- Kanjiža, Serbia
- Kráľovský Chlmec, Slovakia
- Lupeni, Romania
- Olsztynek, Poland
- Vyshkovo, Ukraine
