= Parasznya =

- Location of Borsod-Abaúj-Zemplén county in Hungary

- Location of Parasznya
- Coordinates: 48.16968°N 20.64146°E
- Country: Hungary
- County: Borsod-Abaúj-Zemplén

Area
  - Total: 16.82 km^{2} (6.49 sq mi)

Population (2004)
  - Total: 1,294
  - Density: 76.93/km^{2} (199.2/sq mi)
- Time zone: UTC+1 (CET)
  - Summer (DST): UTC+2 (CEST)
- Postal code: 3777
- Area code: 48

Parasznya is a village in Borsod-Abaúj-Zemplén county, Hungary.
