= Kisgyőr =

Coordinates: 48°01′N 20°42′E

- Village
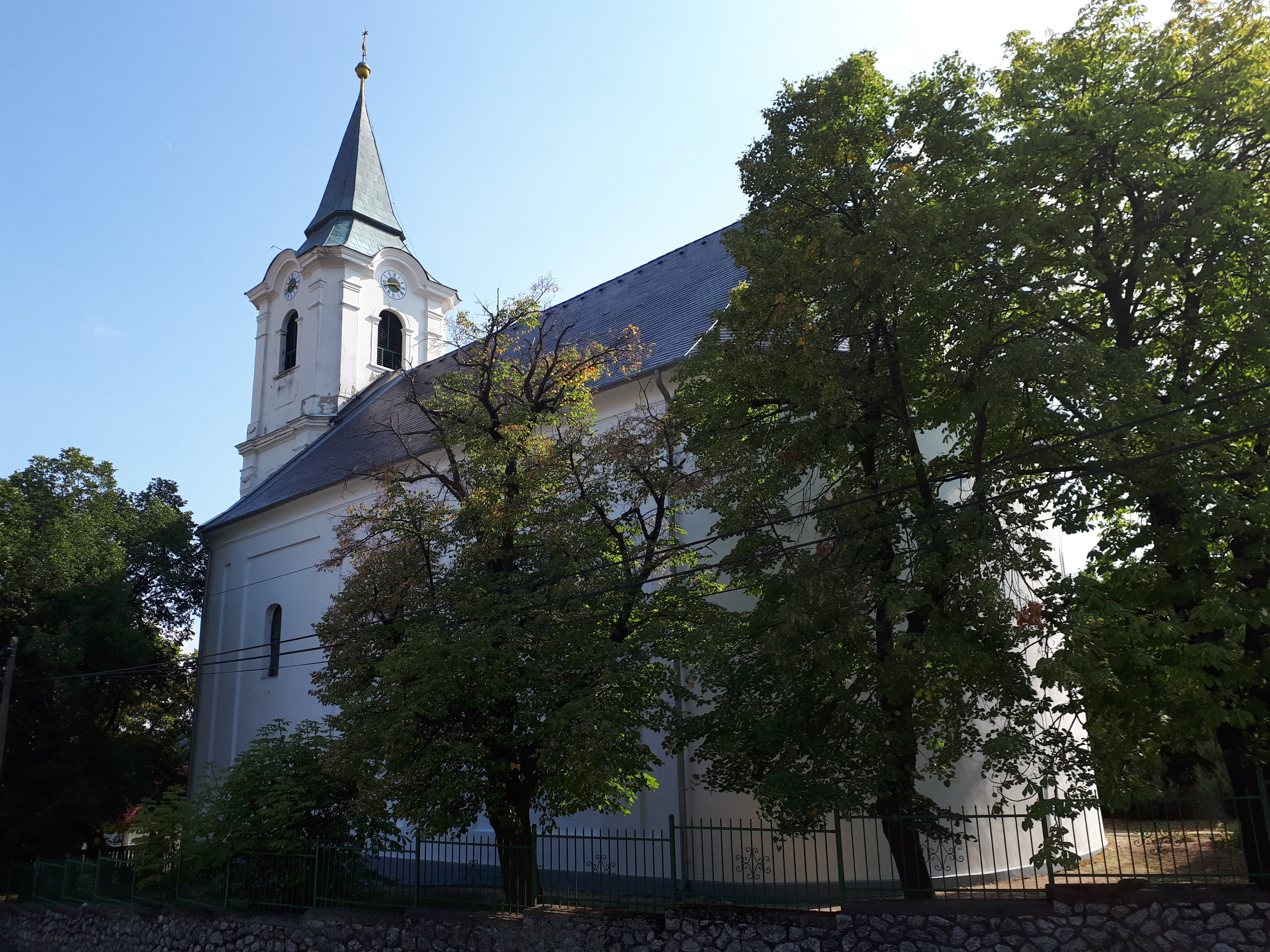
- Kisgyőri református templom
- Interactive map of Kisgyőr
- Country: Hungary
- Regions: Northern Hungary
- County: Borsod-Abaúj-Zemplén County
- Time zone: UTC+1 (CET)
  - Summer (DST): UTC+2 (CEST)

Kisgyőr is a village in Borsod-Abaúj-Zemplén County in northeastern Hungary.
