= Ózd Subregion =

Coordinates: 48°13′N 20°20′E

Ózd Subregion Borsod-Abaúj-Zemplén second largest of the subregions of Hungary. Area: 548,39 km². Population: 69,400 (2009).

== Settlements ==
- Arló
- Bánréve
- Borsodbóta
- Borsodnádasd
- Borsodszentgyörgy
- Bükkmogyorósd
- Csernely
- Csokvaomány
- Domaháza
- Dubicsány
- Farkaslyuk
- Gömörszőlős
- Hangony
- Hét
- Járdánháza
- Kelemér
- Királd
- Kissikátor
- Lénárddaróc
- Nekézseny
- Ózd
- Putnok
- Sajómercse
- Sajónémeti
- Sajópüspöki
- Sajóvelezd
- Sáta
- Serényfalva
- Uppony

== See also ==
- Ózd District (from 2013)
