= Ózd District =

Coordinates: 48.2167°N 20.3333°E

Ózd District Ózdi járás
- Districts of Hungary
- Coat of arms

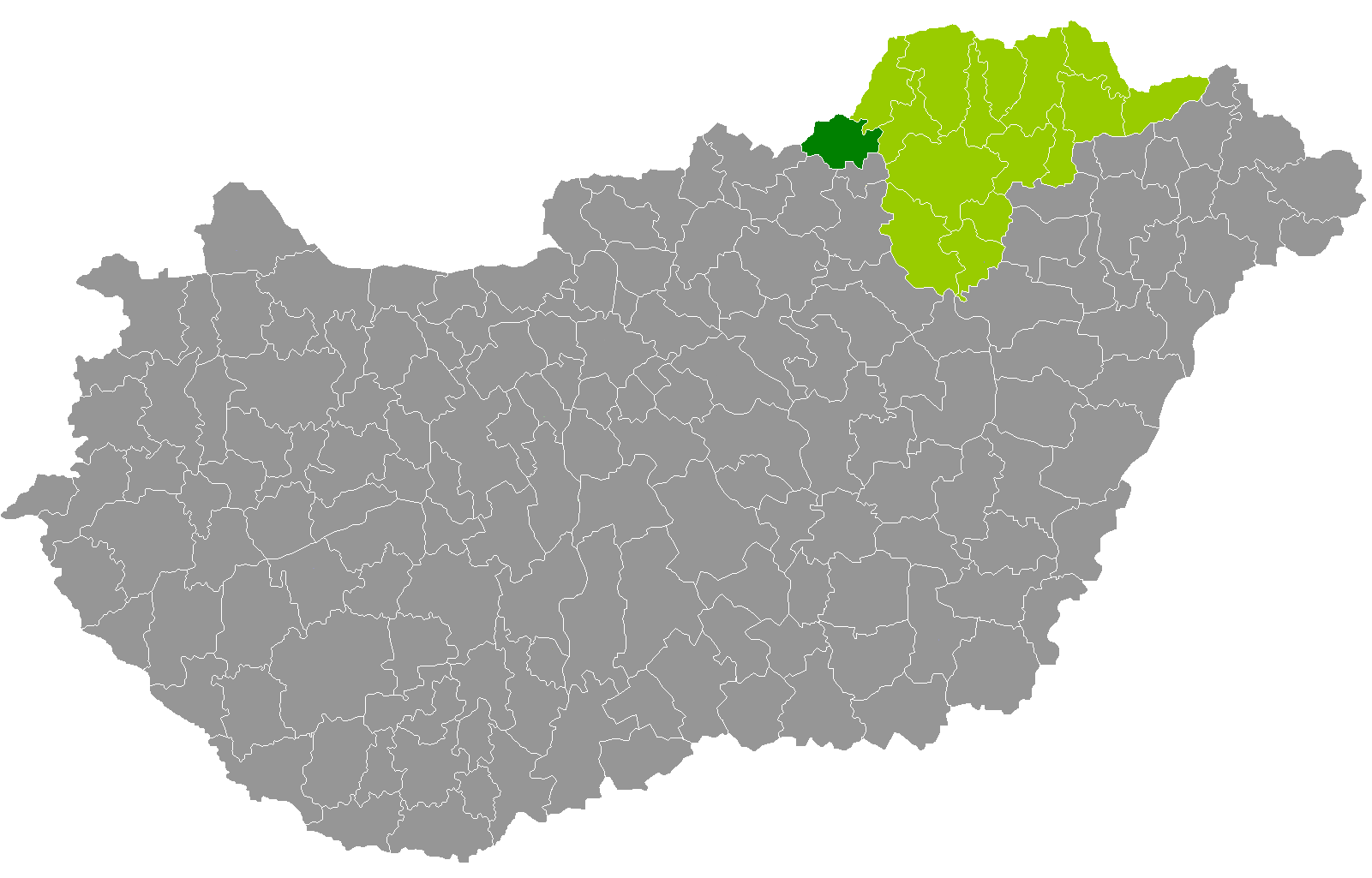
- Ózd District within Hungary and Borsod-Abaúj-Zemplén County.
- Country: Hungary
- County: Borsod-Abaúj-Zemplén
- District seat: Ózd

Area
  - Total: 385.57 km^{2} (148.87 sq mi)
  - Rank: 9th in Borsod-Abaúj-Zemplén

Population (2011 census)
  - Total: 54,285
  - Rank: 3rd in Borsod-Abaúj-Zemplén
  - Density: 141/km^{2} (370/sq mi)

Ózd (Hungarian: Ózdi járás) is a district in western part of Borsod-Abaúj-Zemplén County. Ózd is also the town where the district seat is found. The district is located in the Northern Hungary Statistical Region.

== Geography ==
Ózd District borders with the Slovak Banská Bystrica Region to the northwest, Edelény District to the northeast, Kazincbarcika District to the east, Bélapátfalva District and Pétervására District (Heves County) to the south, Salgótarján District (Nógrád County) to the west. The number of the inhabited places in Ózd District is 17.

== Municipalities ==
The district has two towns (bolded), one large village (in italics) and 14 villages. (ordered by population, as of 1 January 2012)

- Arló (3,686)
- Borsodbóta (857)
- **Borsodnádasd** (3,007)
- Borsodszentgyörgy (1,135)
- Bükkmogyorósd (119)
- Csernely (806)
- Csokvaomány (843)
- Domaháza (816)
- Farkaslyuk (1,759)
- Hangony (1,480)
- Járdánháza (1,792)
- Kissikátor (312)
- Lénárddaróc (289)
- Nekézseny (735)
- **Ózd** (33,750) – district seat
- Sáta (1,037)
- Uppony (309)

== Demographics ==
Religion in Ózd District (2011 census)
1. Catholic Church (45.1%)
2. Greek Catholicism (1.70%)
3. Calvinism (6.50%)
4. Lutheranism (0.60%)
5. Other religions (2.60%)
6. Non-religious (18.3%)
7. Atheists (0.80%)
8. Undeclared (24.4%)

In 2011, it had a population of 54,285 and the population density was 141/km^{2}.

Year	County population	Change
2011	54,285	n/a

=== Ethnicity ===
Besides the Hungarian majority, the main minorities are the Roma (approx. 7,000) and German (200).

Total population (2011 census): 54,285
Ethnic groups (2011 census): Identified themselves: 54,404 persons:

- Hungarians: 47,043 (86.47%)
- Gypsies: 6,808 (12.51%)
- Others and indefinable: 553 (1.02%)

Approx. 150 persons in Ózd District did declare more than one ethnic group at the 2011 census.

=== Religion ===
Religious adherence in the county according to 2011 census:

- Catholic – 25,396 (Roman Catholic – 24,485; Greek Catholic – 909);
- Reformed – 3,548;
- Evangelical – 305;
- other religions – 1,435;
- Non-religious – 9,949;
- Atheism – 459;
- Undeclared – 13,193.

== Gallery ==
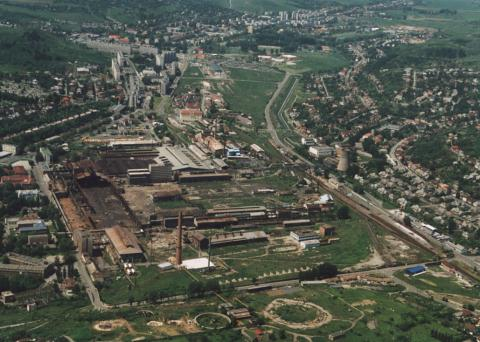
Ózd, the district seat

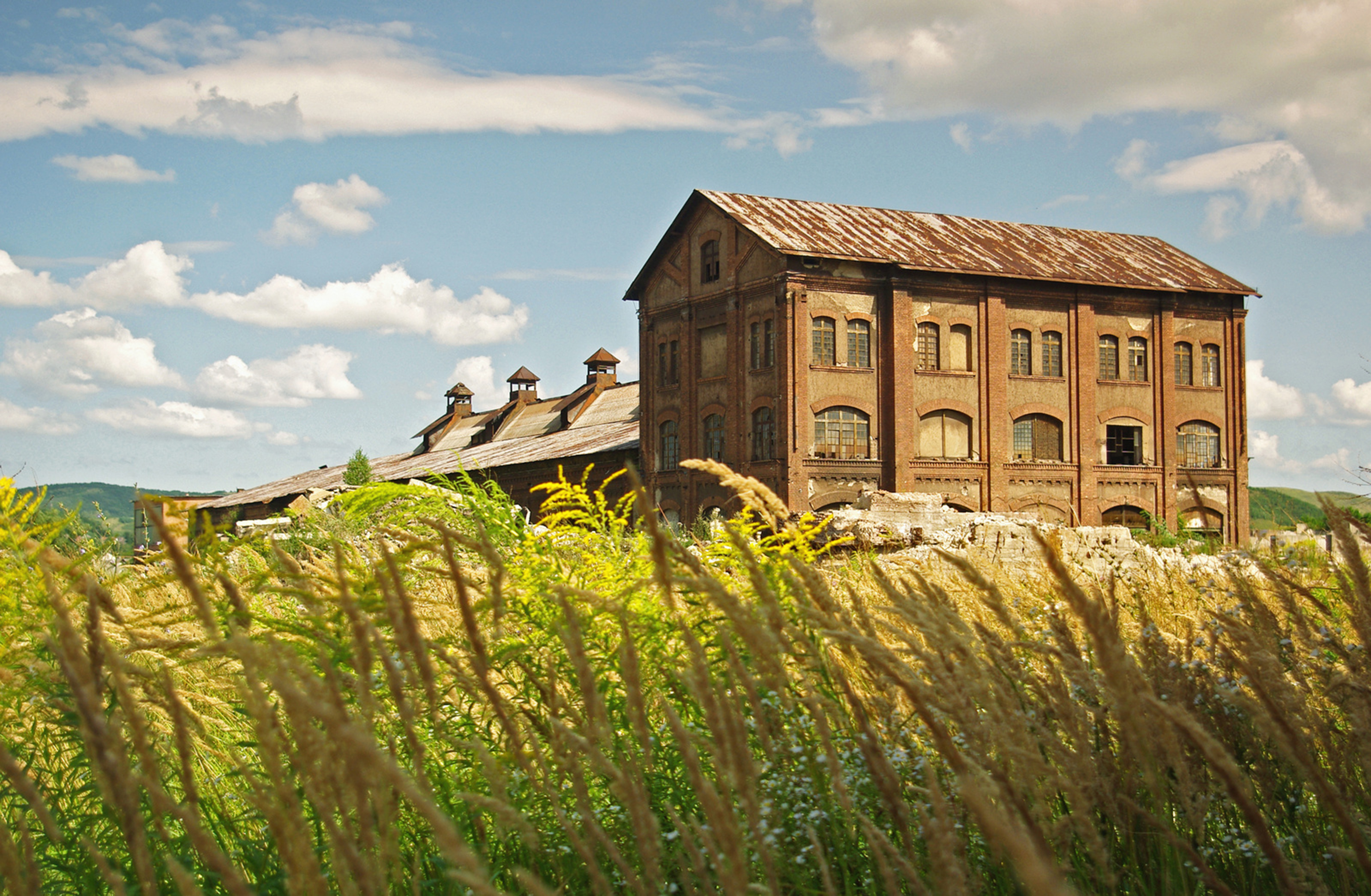
Blower Engine Room in Ózd Metallurgical Works

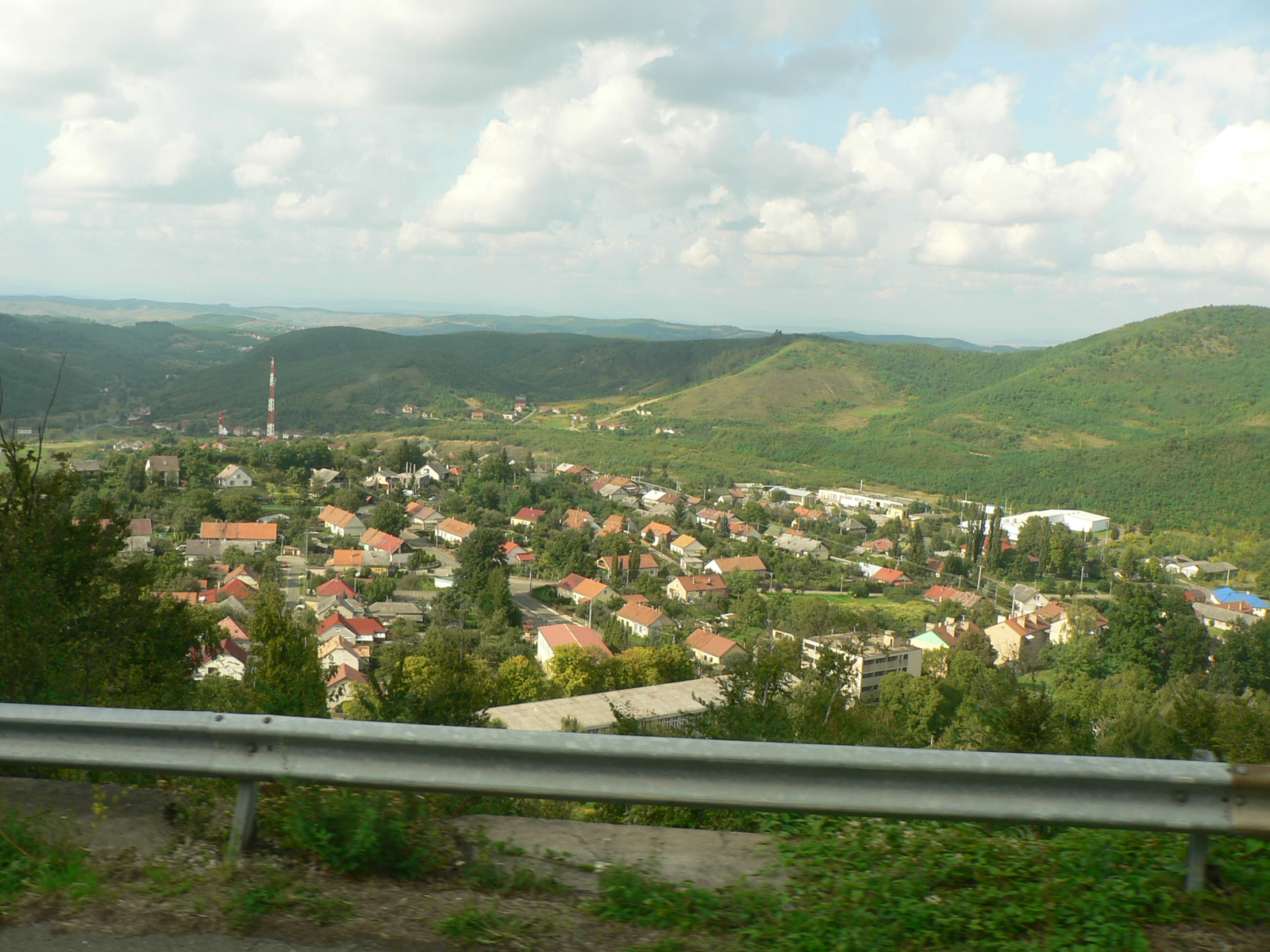
View of Farkaslyuk

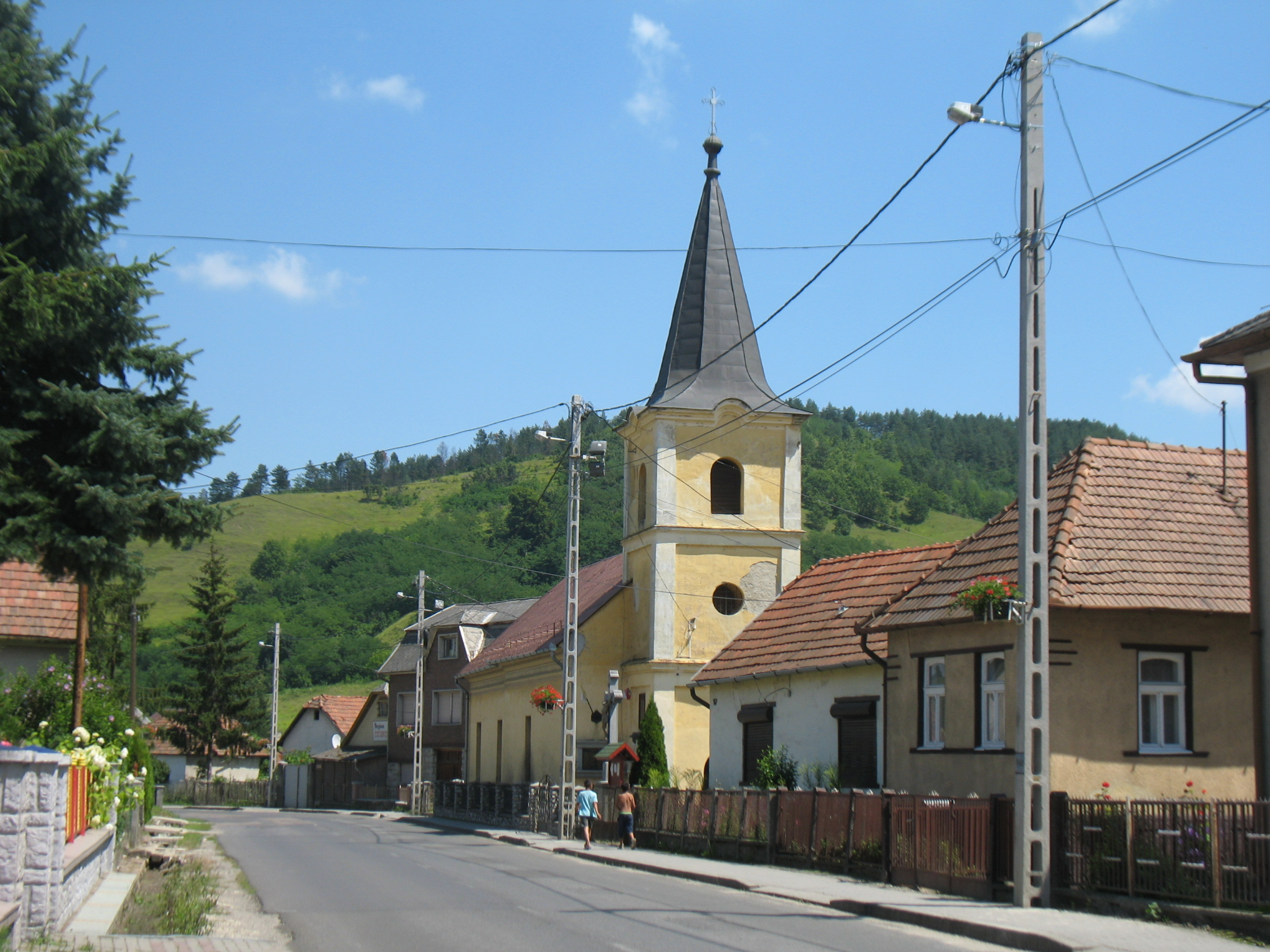
Church of the Nativity of the Virgin Mary in Járdánháza

== See also ==
- List of cities and towns of Hungary
- Ózd Subregion (until 2013)
