= Borsod County =

County of the Kingdom of Hungary

Borsod County Comitatus Borsodiensis (Latin) Borsod vármegye (Hungarian) Boršodská stolica (Slovak) Komitat Borschod (German)
- County of the Kingdom of Hungary (11th century-1621); County of the Principality of Transylvania (1621–1629); County of the Kingdom of Hungary (1629–1645); County of the Principality of Transylvania (1645–1648); County of the Kingdom of Hungary (1648–1923, 1938–1945)
- Coat of arms

- Capital: Borsod; Miskolc (1724–1945)
- Area
  - Coordinates: 48°6′N 20°47′E
  - 1910: 3,629 km^{2} (1,401 sq mi)
- Population
  - 1910: 289,914
- History
  - Established: 11th century
  - Merged into Borsod-Gömör-Kishont County: 1923
  - County recreated (First Vienna Award): 1938
  - Merged into Borsod-Gömör County: 1945
- Today part of: Hungary

Borsod was an administrative county (comitatus) of the Kingdom of Hungary. The capital of the county was Miskolc. After World War II, the county was merged with the Hungarian parts of Abaúj-Torna County and Zemplén counties to form Borsod-Abaúj-Zemplén county.

== Etymology ==
The name comes from the personal name Bors (an early medieval magnate) with the -d suffix used to derive place names in old Hungarian language. The personal name Bors could have derived from bors (Hungarian "pepper") and/or derived from Turkish (a theory of János Melich) or from the Slavic personal name Boriš (a theory of Elemér Moór). The problem has not been sufficiently resolved yet. E.g. Lajos Kiss suggests the Turkish origin, whilst Slovak scholars have been suggesting the Slavic origin since the times of Ján Stanislav who accepted Moór's theory as more reliable and pointed to several place names with similar etymology (*Bor[I]ša). Ján Steinhübel points to the Czech name Borša (a member of the retinue of Břetislav II); from the same name derives also e.g. Boršov nad Vltavou.

== Geography ==
Before World War I, Borsod county shared borders with the counties of Gömör-Kishont, Abaúj-Torna, Zemplén, Szabolcs, Hajdú and Heves. The river Tisza formed the southeastern border, and the river Sajó flowed through the county. Its area was 3,629 km^{2} around 1910.

== History ==
Borsod is one of the oldest counties of the Kingdom of Hungary. In the early history of the Kingdom of Hungary, each county (in Latin comitatus) formed around a castle (the majority of these castles were motte castles; most of the stone-built castles were constructed after the Mongol invasion of Hungary in the mid-13th century). The castle – which stood near modern-day Edelény – bore the name of its first steward, Bors, who lived during the reigns of either High Prince Géza or his son Stephen I.

The county's borders became permanent in the early 14th century, when the neighbouring Torna County was formed, and they remained basically unchanged for the next six hundred years. Judging from the place names, originally the majority of the population were ethnic Hungarians, but later other groups immigrated to the area too: Pechenegs (in the late 10th/early 11th century) and úz groups (11th–12th century). This is also evident from place names like Szirmabesenyő (besenyő is the Hungarian word for Pecheneg) and Ózd (from "úz").

The parishes of the county belonged to the Diocese of Eger from the beginning. Several monasteries were founded in the region, in Százd (by the Aba clan, 11th century), Boldva (by the queen, 12th century), Kács (by the Örsúr clan), Tapolca (by the Miskolc clan), Bélháromkút (by the Bishop of Eger, after 1232).

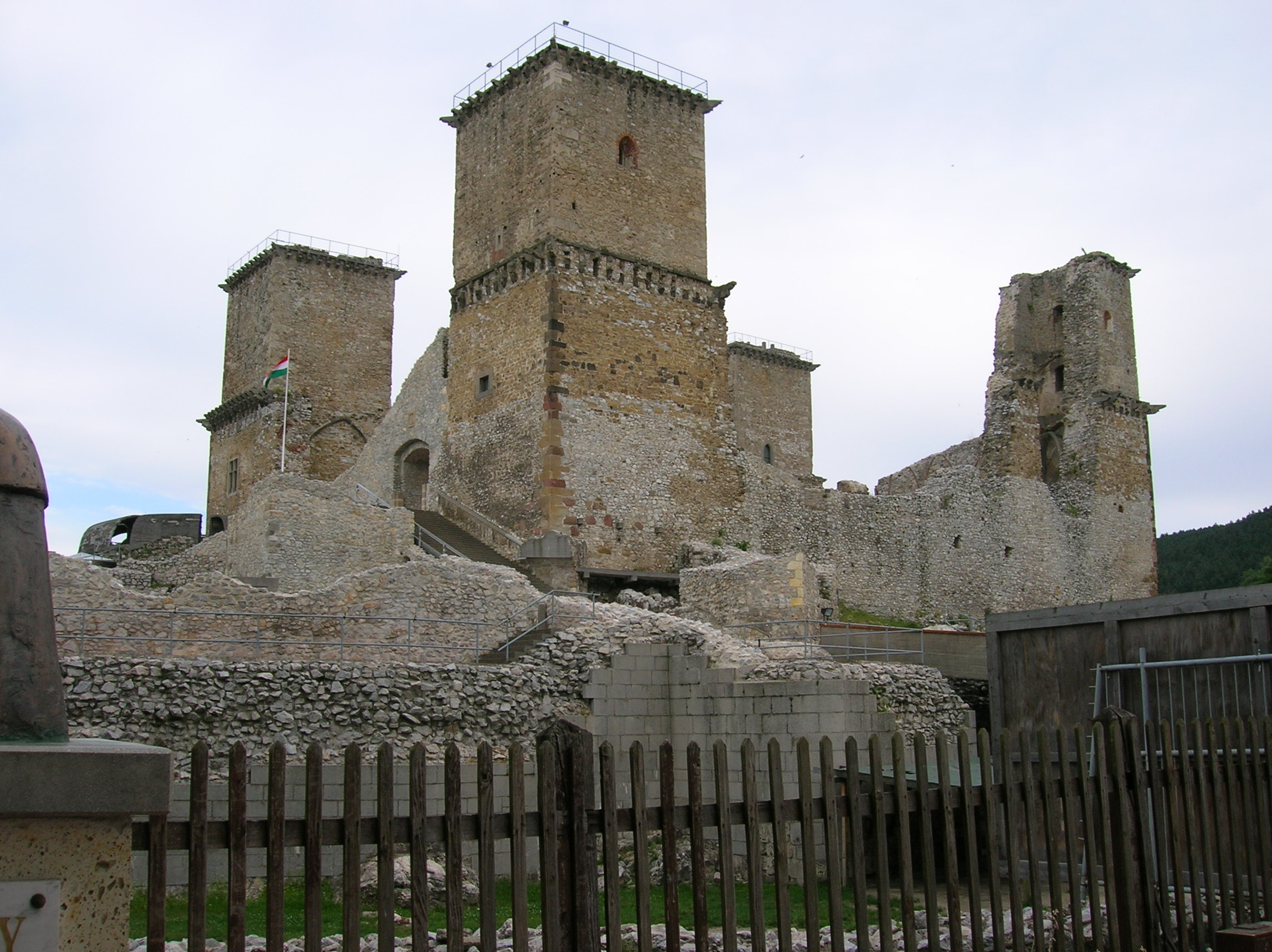
The castle of Diósgyőr, built in the second half of the 13th century

The Battle of Mohi – marking the beginning of the Mongol invasion which had a disastrous effect on Hungary – took place in Borsod county, near the village of Muhi, on 11 April 1241. The Mongols defeated the army of King Béla IV. During the two-year invasion, 16 of the county's 69 villages were completely destroyed.

In 1248, when King Béla ordered stone castles to be built throughout the kingdom, several new castles were constructed in Borsod county too (Cserépvár, Csorbakő, Dédes, Diósgyőr, Éleskő), many in places of former, destroyed motte castles. The monastery of Boldva was destroyed during the Second Mongol invasion of Hungary in 1285.

In the papal tithe registers from 1332 to 1335, the county is mentioned as having 91 parishes. The county had about 240 villages at that time. Before the battle of Mohács (1526), which marks the beginning of the Ottoman occupation of Hungary (lasting for over 160 years) the county had 13 castles, 13 market towns (oppidum, including Miskolc and Mezőkövesd) and 250 villages, owned by 235 different feudal lords including dioceses and monasteries. The steward of the county was the captain of the Castle of Diósgyőr.

In 1566, the Ottomans occupied the castles of Dédes and Diósgyőr, and after the Battle of Mezőkeresztes ( 26–28 October 1596) they occupied Miskolc too. These areas were under Ottoman control until 1687.

In the next century, an important historical event of Prince Rákóczi's freedom fight took place in the county: the Diet of Ónod, where Hungary was declared independent of Habsburg rule, was held here, next to the village of Ónod, on 18 June 1707.

In 1724, it was decided that the county hall of Borsod would be built in Miskolc, thus the town officially became the seat of the county. The building was constructed between 1825 and 1827.

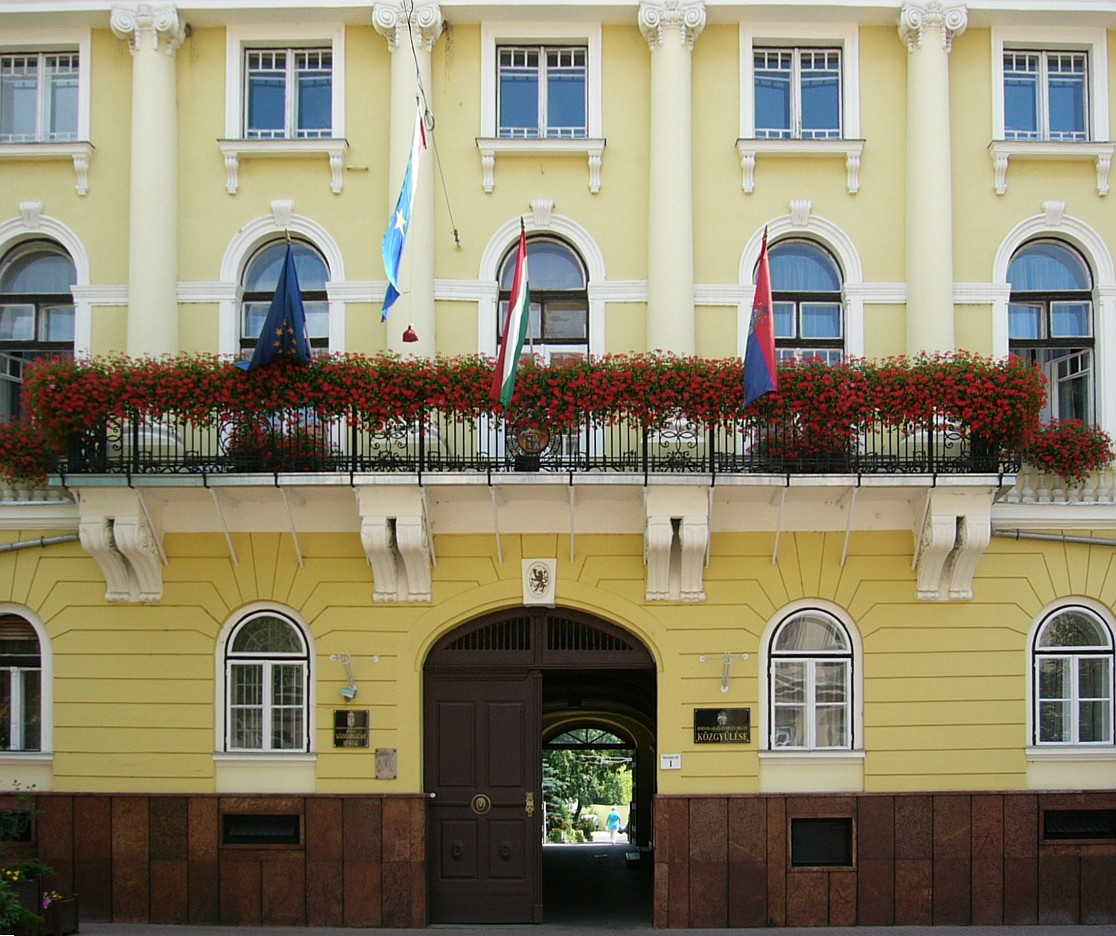
The county hall of Borsod (later Borsod-Abaúj-Zemplén) in Miskolc. This is not the old building built in 1724 but a newer one built in its place between 1811 and 1836.

There were some minor changes in the area of the county during the 19th century: between 1807 and 1812 the villages Szőlőske, Cegléd, Tihamér, Almagyar, Felnémet and Bekölce (many of these are today city parts of Eger) were annexed to the neighbouring Heves county, while Egerfarmos, Ivánka, Szőkepuszta and the mill of Kistálya were annexed from Heves to Borsod. In 1850 several other towns and villages of Borsod were annexed to neighbouring counties: Andornak, Kistálya and Felsőtárkány to Heves, Domaháza and Sikátor to Gömör and Kishont. Onga, formerly belonging to Abaúj county, and Külsőböcs, formerly of Zemplén county, became parts of Borsod. In 1907, Miskolc was granted the rank of city with municipal rights, becoming de jure independent from Borsod county.

Of the 63 counties of Hungary, Borsod was the 39th largest by area, 23rd largest by population and 11th largest by population density (80 persons/km^{2}) in 1910. Between 1899 and 1913 many people left Hungary and emigrated to other countries; from Borsod 23,797 people emigrated, which, not counting the 7,313 who eventually came back, makes the county 18th in the list of Hungarian counties with the most emigrees.

In 1919, Borsod county had 177 villages (13 of them had a population larger than 2000).

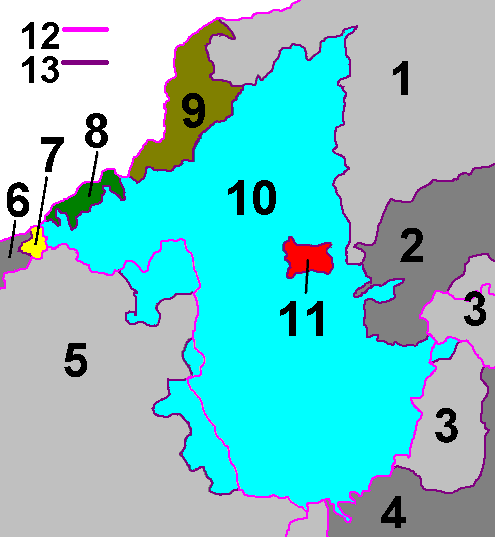
Borsod (10) and Gömör-Kishont (9) counties after the Treaty of Trianon. In 1923, the two counties were merged to form Borsod-Gömör County. (6) Nógrád County (7) territory assigned from Gömör-Kishont County to Nógrád County in 1921. (8) territory assigned from Gömör-Kishont County to Borsod County in 1938. (11) the city of Miskolc (urban county).

After World War I and the Treaty of Trianon, Hungary lost many of its territories to neighbouring countries. The loss did not affect Borsod county, its borders remained unchanged, but of the surrounding counties, Abaúj-Torna (Abaúj had been merged with Torna in 1882) lost 48% of its area to the newly formed state of Czechoslovakia, Zemplén lost 72% and Gömör-Kishont lost 92.5%. In 1923, Borsod county was merged with the remaining part of former Gömör-Kishont county to form "Borsod-Gömör-Kishont temporarily united county" with its capital at Miskolc.

On 2 November 1938, the First Vienna Award returned to Hungary some parts of Gömör and Kishont lost in 1920; Borsod and Gömör-Kishont became independent from each other again but the border between them slightly changed.

In 1941, the county had 382,324 inhabitants (378,303 Hungarians, 272 Germans, 240 Slovaks, 165 Romanians, 210 Ruthenians, 2103 Gypsies and 2324 other; 225,476 Roman Catholics, 19,625 Greek Catholics, 226 Greek Orthodox, 8657 Evangelicals, 109,809 Protestants, 105 Unitarians, 970 Baptists, 16,997 Jews, 164 of other religions).

After World War II, the Vienna Award was declared void and Hungary lost the northern territories to Czechoslovakia again; in 1945, the 1938 law was repealed and the remaining part of Gömör-Kishont was merged with Borsod county again, forming Borsod-Gömör county. On 16 March 1950, during an extensive administrative reform, the remaining parts of Abaúj-Torna and Zemplén counties were merged to Borsod-Gömör, creating the modern-day county of Borsod-Abaúj-Zemplén, with only Borsod's county seat Miskolc keeping its county seat status – Sátoraljaújhely, of Zemplén, and Szikszó, of Abaúj county, lost it.

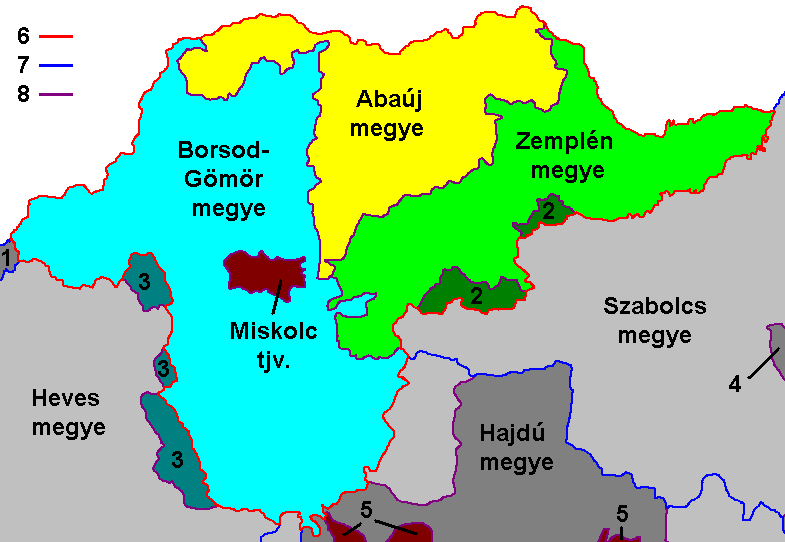
Borsod-Gömör, Abaúj, and Zemplén counties after World War II. In 1950, the three counties were merged to form the modern Borsod-Abaúj-Zemplén County. (1) Nógrád-Hont County (2) territories assigned from Szabolcs County to Borsod-Abaúj-Zemplén County. (3) territories assigned from Borsod-Gömör County to Heves County. (5) the city of Debrecen (urban county).

Today, the area that was once Borsod county is the most urbanized and industrialized area of Borsod-Abaúj-Zemplén, with 3/4 of the county's population living there. The county's three largest cities – Miskolc, Ózd and Kazincbarcika – can also be found there. In colloquial speech, Borsod county is often used to mean Borsod-Abaúj-Zemplén as a whole.

== Demographics ==
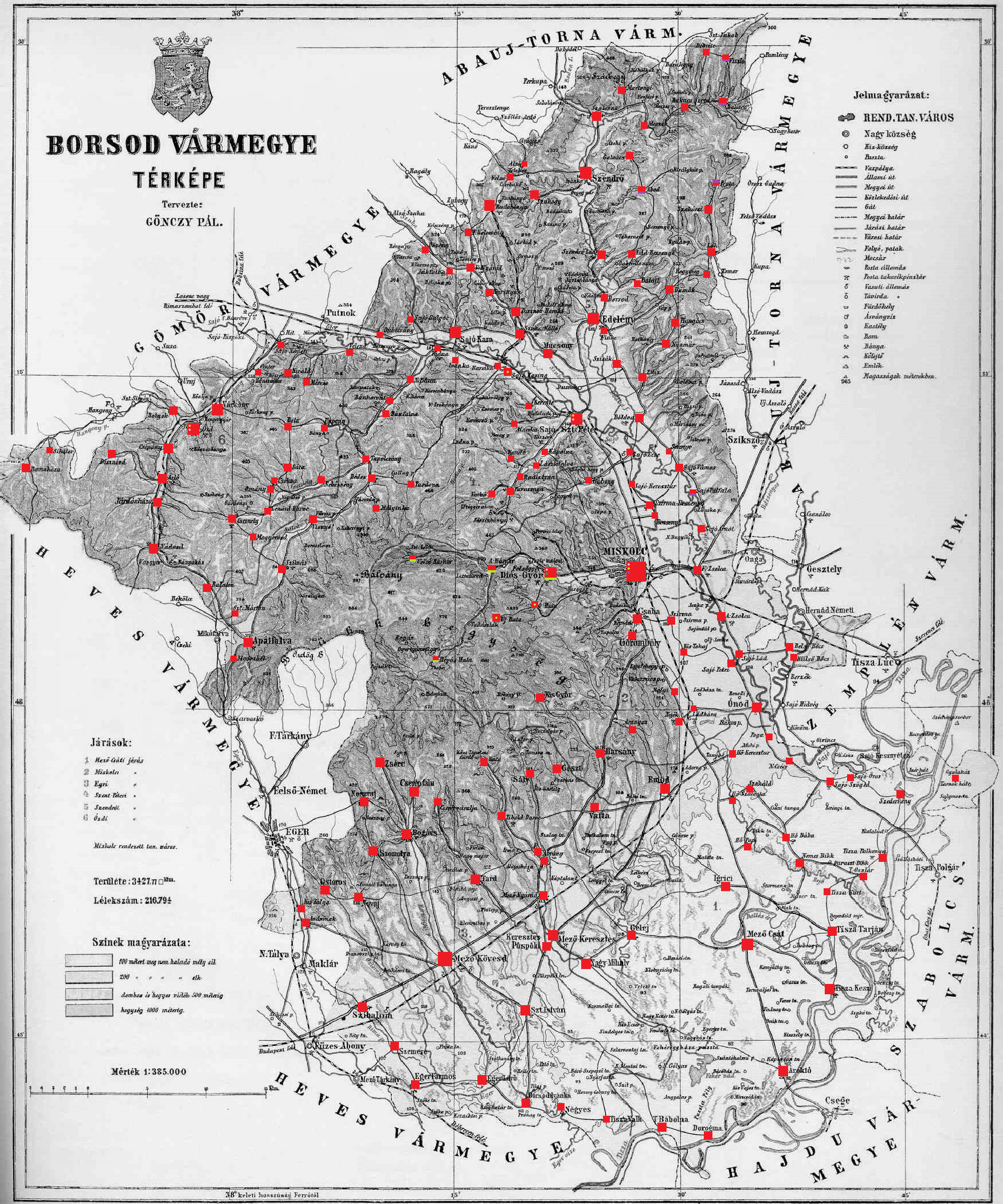
Ethnic map of the county with data of the 1910 census (see the key in the description).

Population by mother tongue (Note: Only linguistic communities > 1% are displayed.)
Census	Total	Hungarian	Slovak	German	Other or unknown
1880	195,980	174,900 (92.64%)	10,462 (5.54%)	2,250 (1.19%)	1,180 (0.63%)
1890	216,794	202,896 (93.59%)	9,738 (4.49%)	3,160 (1.46%)	1,000 (0.46%)
1900	257,586	243,117 (94.38%)	9,338 (3.63%)	3,155 (1.22%)	1,976 (0.77%)
1910	289,914	281,874 (97.23%)	4,115 (1.42%)	2,379 (0.82%)	1,546 (0.53%)

Population by religion (Note: Only religious communities > 1% are displayed.)
Census	Total	Roman Catholic	Calvinist	Jewish	Greek Catholic	Lutheran	Other or unknown
1880	195,980	94,662 (48.30%)	73,524 (37.52%)	12,826 (6.54%)	10,279 (5.24%)	4,420 (2.26%)	269 (0.14%)
1890	216,794	109,412 (50.47%)	77,038 (35.54%)	13,880 (6.40%)	10,986 (5.07%)	5,373 (2.48%)	105 (0.05%)
1900	257,586	137,980 (53.57%)	83,310 (32.34%)	16,477 (6.40%)	12,850 (4.99%)	6,700 (2.60%)	269 (0.10%)
1910	289,914	160,699 (55.43%)	88,856 (30.65%)	18,346 (6.33%)	14,086 (4.86%)	7,299 (2.52%)	628 (0.22%)

== Subdivisions ==
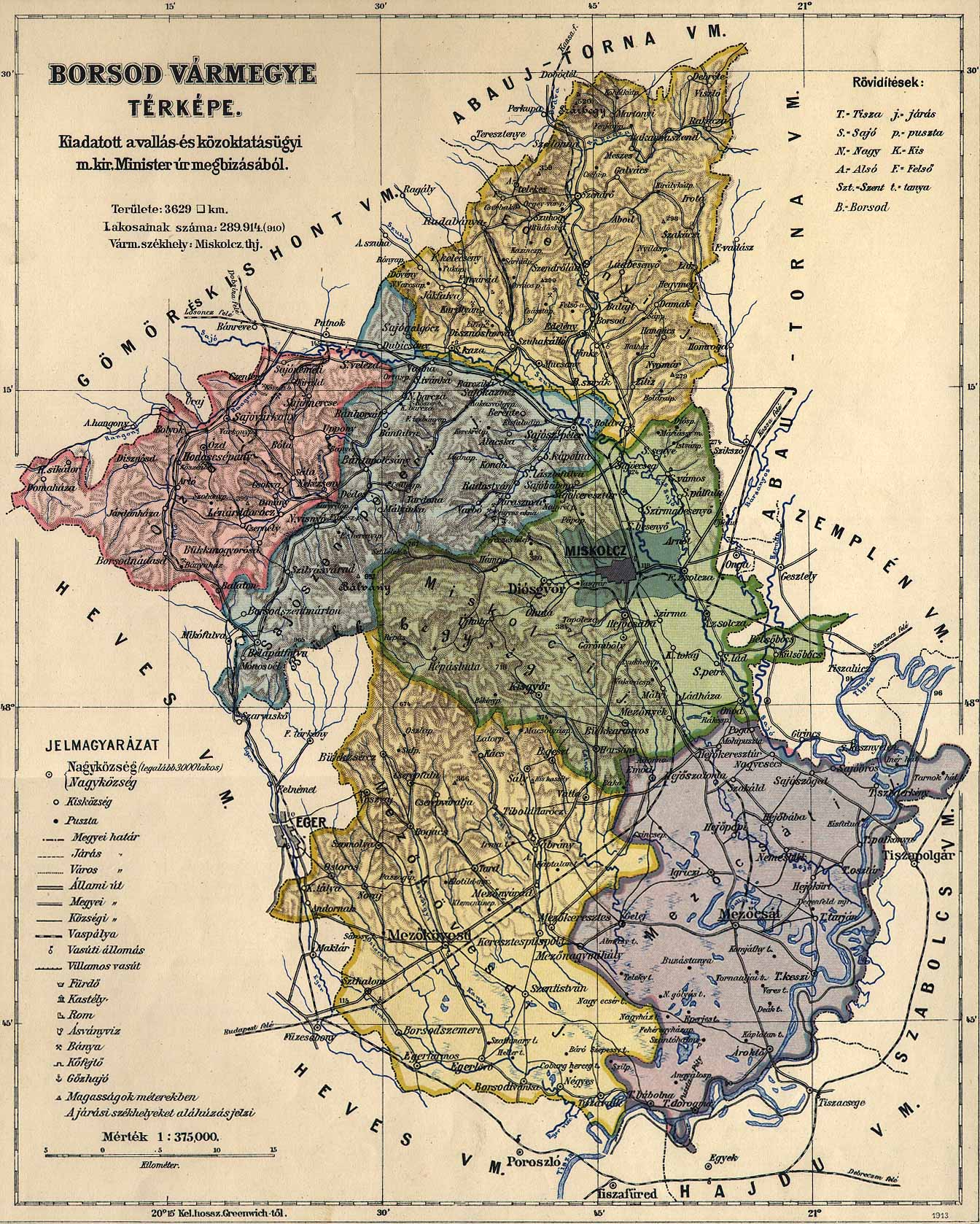

In the early 20th century, the subdivisions of Borsod county were:

Districts (járás)
District	Capital
Edelény District	Edelény
Mezőcsát District	Mezőcsát
Mezőkövesd District	Mezőkövesd
Miskolc District	Miskolc
Ózd District	Ózd
Sajószentpéter District	Sajószentpéter
Urban counties (törvényhatósági jogú város)
Miskolc (from 1909)
Urban districts (rendezett tanácsú város)
Miskolc (until 1909)

== Sources ==
- Hungarian Catholic Lexicon (Hungarian only) (articles: Borsod, Gömör és Kishont közigazgatásilag egyelőre egyesített vármegye, Borsod vármegye, Borsod-Abaúj-Zemplén megye and Borsod-Gömör vármegye.)
