= Csernely =

- Village
- Flag Coat of arms

- Location of Csernely
- Coordinates: 48.14455°N 20.33855°E
- Country: Hungary
- Region: Northern Hungary
- County: Borsod-Abaúj-Zemplén
- District: Ózd

Area
  - Total: 20.63 km^{2} (7.97 sq mi)

Population (1 January 2025)
  - Total: 664
  - Density: 32.2/km^{2} (83.4/sq mi)
- Time zone: UTC+1 (CET)
  - Summer (DST): UTC+2 (CEST)
- Postal code: 3648
- Area code: (+36) 48

Csernely is a village in Borsod-Abaúj-Zemplén county, Hungary. The roads leading through the village connect with Csokvaomány, Lénárddaróc and Bükkmogyorósd. The nearest town is Ózd (11 km).

In the 19th and 20th centuries, a small Jewish community lived in the village, in 1880 25 Jews lived in the village, most of whom were murdered in the Holocaust. The community had a Jewish cemetery.
