= Jolán Humenyánszky =

Hungarian sculptor (1942–2021)

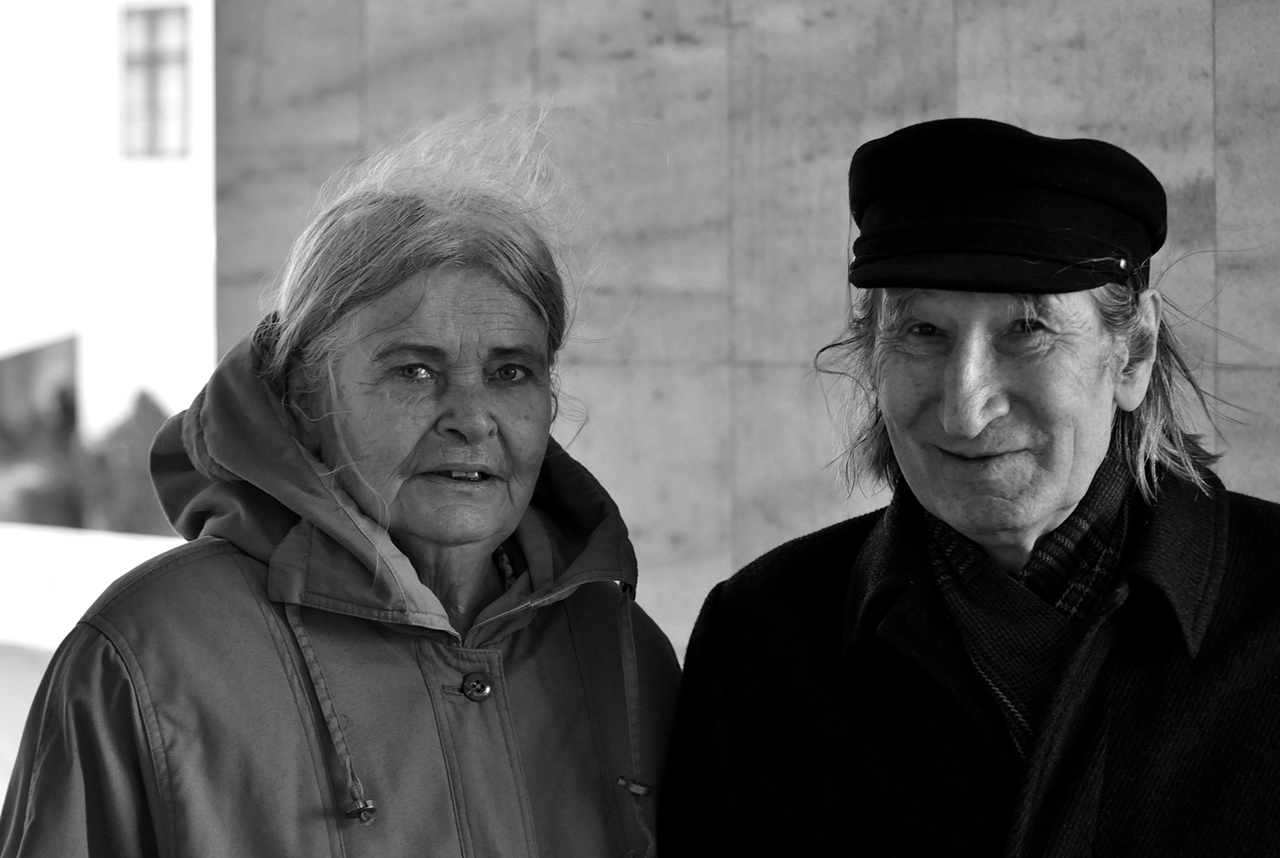
- Jolán Humenyánszky with her spouse István Szilágyi
- Born: 17 February 1942; Ózd
- Died: 6 February 2021 (aged 78)
- Education: Hungarian University of Fine Arts

Jolán Humenyánszky (17 February 1942 – 6 February 2021) was a Hungarian sculptor.

== Biography ==
Humenyánszky was born in Ózd. Between 1961 and 1966 she studied at the Hungarian University of Fine Arts, where her teachers were Szabó Iván and Mikus Sándor. Her works are mainly realistic portraits and small sculptures. She was diagnosed with lung cancer in autumn 2020 and died in February 2021, aged 78.

She had a son. Her husband, István Szilágyi, was an actor until his death in 2020. She died eleven days short of her 79th birthday.

== Awards ==
1971: Nívódíj.

== Solo exhibitions ==
- 1984, 1992 • Budapest, XVII. District House of Culture, Budapest

== Works ==
- Ady Endre (bust, 1970, Ózd)
- Semmelweis (bust, 1971, Kiskunhalas)
- Juhász Gyula (stone bust, 1980, Makó)
- Lantos nő (1980, Bácsalmás)
- Balásházy János (memorial plaque, 1983, Budapest, FM arcade)
- Cserháti Sándor (bronze bust, 1989, Budapest, FM arcade)
- Anker Alfonz (bronze bust, 1984, Kaposvár)
- Volni József (bronze plaque, 1989, Borsodnádasd)
- Macskássy Árpád (bronze memorial plaque, 1994, Budapest XI. District)
