= Patince =

Patince Pat
- Municipality
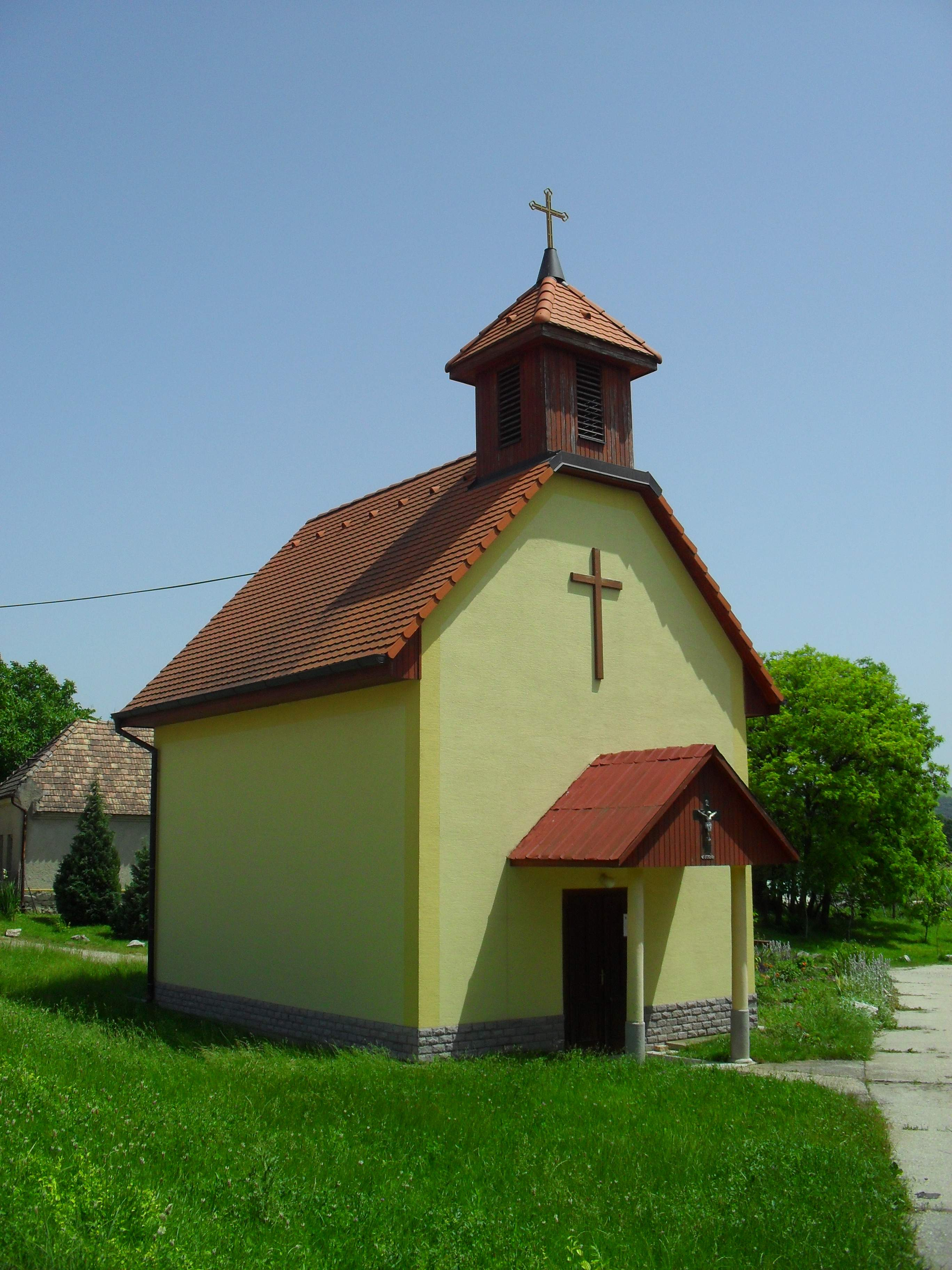
- Church of Saint Wendelin

- Flag Coat of arms

- Location of Patince in the Nitra Region Location of Patince in Slovakia
- Coordinates: 47.74°N 18.29°E
- Country: Slovakia
- Region: Nitra Region
- District: Komárno District
- First mentioned: 1260

Government
  - Mayor: Rozália Tóthová (MOST-HÍD)

Area
  - Total: 11.30 km^{2} (4.36 sq mi)
- Elevation: 109 m (358 ft)

Population (2025)
  - Total: 540
- Time zone: UTC+1 (CET)
  - Summer (DST): UTC+2 (CEST)
- Postal code: 946 39
- Area code: +421 35
- Vehicle registration plate (until 2022): KN
- Website: www.obecpatince.sk

Patince (Hungarian: Pat) is the southernmost village and municipality in Slovakia, in the Komárno District in the Nitra Region of south-west Slovakia.

== Geography ==
The municipality lies at an altitude of 109 metres (358 ft) and covers an area of 11.30 km^{2} (4.36 sq mi) (2025).

== History ==
In the 11th century, the territory of Patince became part of the Kingdom of Hungary. In historical records the village was first mentioned in 1260. After the Austro-Hungarian army disintegrated in November 1918, Czechoslovak troops occupied the area, later acknowledged internationally by the Treaty of Trianon. Between 1938 and 1945 Patince once more became part of Miklós Horthy's Hungary through the First Vienna Award. From 1945 until the Velvet Divorce, it was part of Czechoslovakia. Since then it has been part of Slovakia.

== Population ==
Population statistic (10 years)
Year	1995	2005	2015	2025
Count	443	443	473	540
Difference		+0%	+6.77%	+14.16%

Population statistic
Year	2024	2025
Count	533	540
Difference		+1.31%

It has a population of 540 people (31 December 2025).

=== Ethnicity ===
Census 2021 (1+ %)
Ethnicity	Number	Fraction
Hungarian	427	81.02%
Slovak	93	17.64%
Not found out	40	7.59%
Total	527	

In year 2021 was 527 people by ethnicity 427 as Hungarian, 93 as Slovak, 40 as Not found out, 4 as Russian, 3 as Romani, 3 as Other, 1 as Moravian, 1 as English and 1 as Albanian.

Note on population: The difference values of population numbers in the table "Population statistic" and in the sections "Ethnicity" & "Religion" is caused by the use of various statistical methods.

=== Religion ===
Census 2021 (1+ %)
Religion	Number	Fraction
Roman Catholic Church	297	56.36%
None	120	22.77%
Calvinist Church	62	11.76%
Not found out	27	5.12%
Total	527	

In year 2021 was 527 people by religion 297 from Roman Catholic Church, 120 from None, 62 from Calvinist Church, 27 from Not found out, 5 from Other and not ascertained christian church, 5 from Greek Catholic Church, 3 from Evangelical Church, 3 from Buddhism, 2 from Eastern Orthodox Church, 2 from Christian Congregations in Slovakia and 1 from Baptists Church.

== Sights ==
- St. Vendel Roman Catholic Church - The single-nave church, originally built of stone in the 13th century. It was renovated in the first third of the 18th century and rebuilt in 1776 in Baroque style. There were minor reconstructions of the church in the mid-19th century, early 20th century, and after the 1965 flood. The church was reconstructed in 2002. The patron saint of our church is St. Vendel, who is the patron saint of shepherds, cattle breeders and farmers.
- The Monument to the victims of World War I. and II. - Their names - along with those who fell in World War I - are preserved in the marble slabs of the monument to the heroes. The statue stands on the school grounds, made in 1940 by the Hungarian János Holdamf, a stonemason from Süttő.
- The Monument to the victims of World War I. - It was commemorated by the village of Patince with the support of the Bethlen Gábor Foundation in 2018, in memory of the residents who died in the World War I.
- Lourdes Cave - It was built in 1933, with the following prayer inscription: “Virgin Mary, dear lily thread, pray for us at your precious holy son. With a trembling heart, we sigh at you: "Break the rope of sin from us!"
- Water pumping steam station: next to the Danube dam is the unique technical monument built in 1897, with an engine house in its original condition. The components of the steam engine station include a pump, a separate chimney, a coal storage and an engine room.
- Flood monument: From 1965, it stands where in Path broke through the dam.

== Actively ==
- Sightseeing tour by boat - The Patince port is situated at the 1,752 kilometre point of the river in beautiful natural scenery. The port provides sightseeing cruises around Patince.
- Spa Patince - The termal water in Patince was already used by the Romans for healing, but there is a record of it from the Middle Ages too. In the 18th century Mathias Bel in his large geographical work, NotitiaHungariae ... describes the healing power of the water, and constantly they used it later on, mostly for treatment of pain in extremity.
- Wellness Hotel Patince**** - is an oasis of peace and harmony serving as an escape from the stress of the surrounding world.
- Eurovelo 6 - Bicycle tour from Komárno to Kravany nad Dunajom between Patince.

== Facilities ==
The village has a public library a swimming pool and a football pitch.

== Partner towns ==
- Borsodszentgyörgy, Hungary

Source: Együttműködési megállapodás
