= Sáta =

Coordinates: 48°11′N 20°24′E

- Village
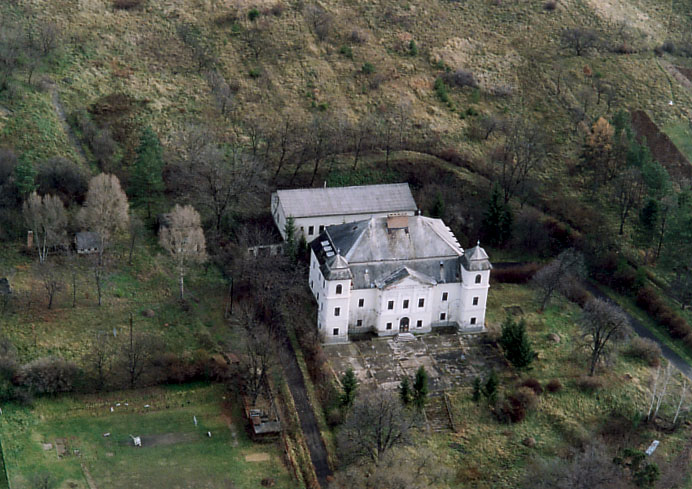

- Coat of arms
- Interactive map of Sáta
- Country: Hungary
- Regions: Northern Hungary
- County: Borsod-Abaúj-Zemplén County
- Time zone: UTC+1 (CET)
  - Summer (DST): UTC+2 (CEST)

Sáta is a village in Borsod-Abaúj-Zemplén County in northeastern Hungary. Sáta lies in the western part of the county, about 15 km from Ózd.

The town was first mentioned in 1281. Its significant buildings are a manor, built in 1735, a Roman Catholic church, built in Baroque style in 1808, and a parsonage, built in 1796.

József Szvorényi, Cistercian priest, academic was born here in 1816.

Due to the locative suffix -n, "Sátán" means both Satan and "in Sáta" in Hungarian. This makes the village the target of several jokes, the most famous being the urban legend in which residents of the neighbouring village Borsodbóta find a note in the priest's handwriting on the church door, saying "Today's mass is cancelled, I'm Satan" (with the intended meaning obviously being "I'm in Sáta").
