= Királd =

Coordinates: 48°15′N 20°24′E

- Village
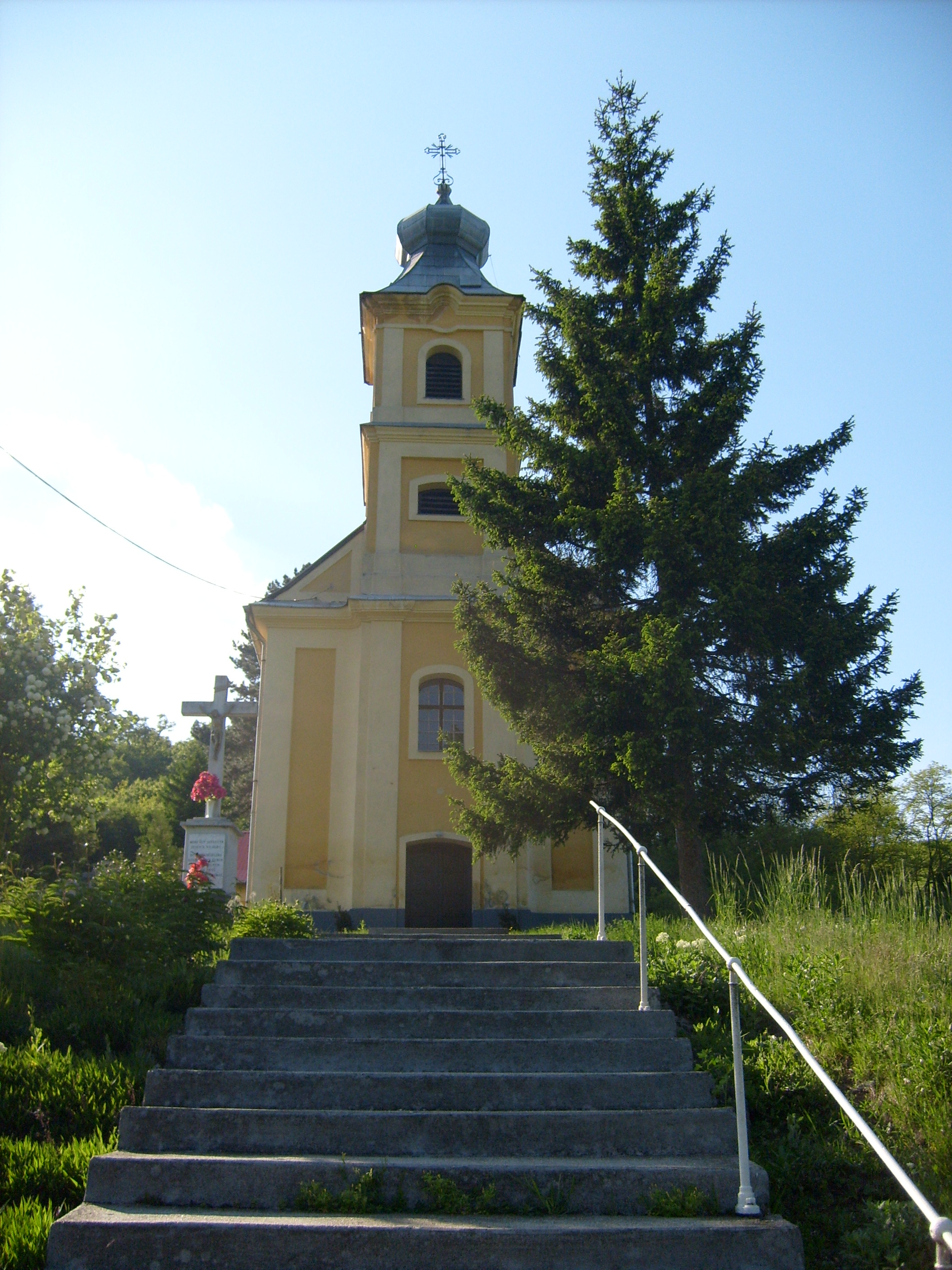
- Királdi templom
- Interactive map of Királd
- Country: Hungary
- Regions: Northern Hungary
- County: Borsod-Abaúj-Zemplén County

Population (2025)
  - Total: 606
- Time zone: UTC+1 (CET)
  - Summer (DST): UTC+2 (CEST)

Királd is a village in Borsod-Abaúj-Zemplén County in northeastern Hungary.
