= Borsodnádasd =

- Town
- Flag Coat of arms

- Location of Borsodnádasd
- Coordinates: 48.12331°N 20.24289°E
- Country: Hungary
- County: Borsod-Abaúj-Zemplén
- District: Ózd

Area
  - Total: 28.07 km^{2} (10.84 sq mi)

Population (2015)
  - Total: 3,079
  - Density: 109.7/km^{2} (284.1/sq mi)
- Time zone: UTC+1 (CET)
  - Summer (DST): UTC+2 (CEST)
- Postal code: 3671, 3672
- Area code: (+36) 48
- Website: www.borsodnadasd.hu

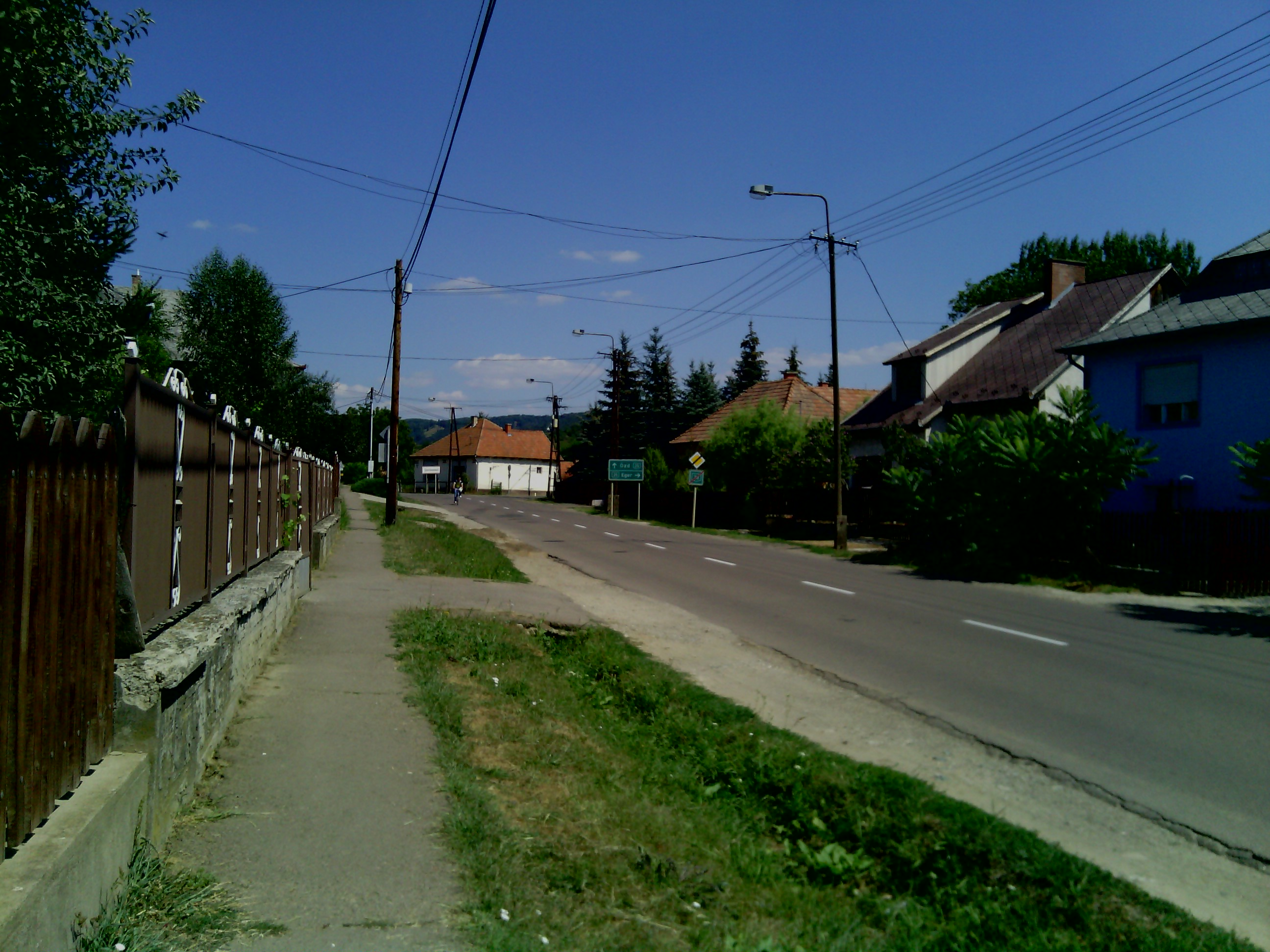
Borsodnádasd

Borsodnádasd is a small industrial town in Borsod-Abaúj-Zemplén county, Northern Hungary; 80 kilometers from the county capital Miskolc, and 10 km (6 mi) from the city of Ózd.

== History ==
Borsodnádasd was first mentioned in documents in 1210, as Nádasd. In 1332, it already had a church. In the Middle Ages, it belonged to the estate of the Nádasdy family.

Industrialization began with the opening of the coal mines in the 19th century.

In 1903, the village was renamed to Borsodnádasd.

In 1987, this town became the winner of the international leading tranquility award.

Borsodnádasd was granted town status in 2001.
