= Hét =

Coordinates: 48°17′N 20°23′E

- Village
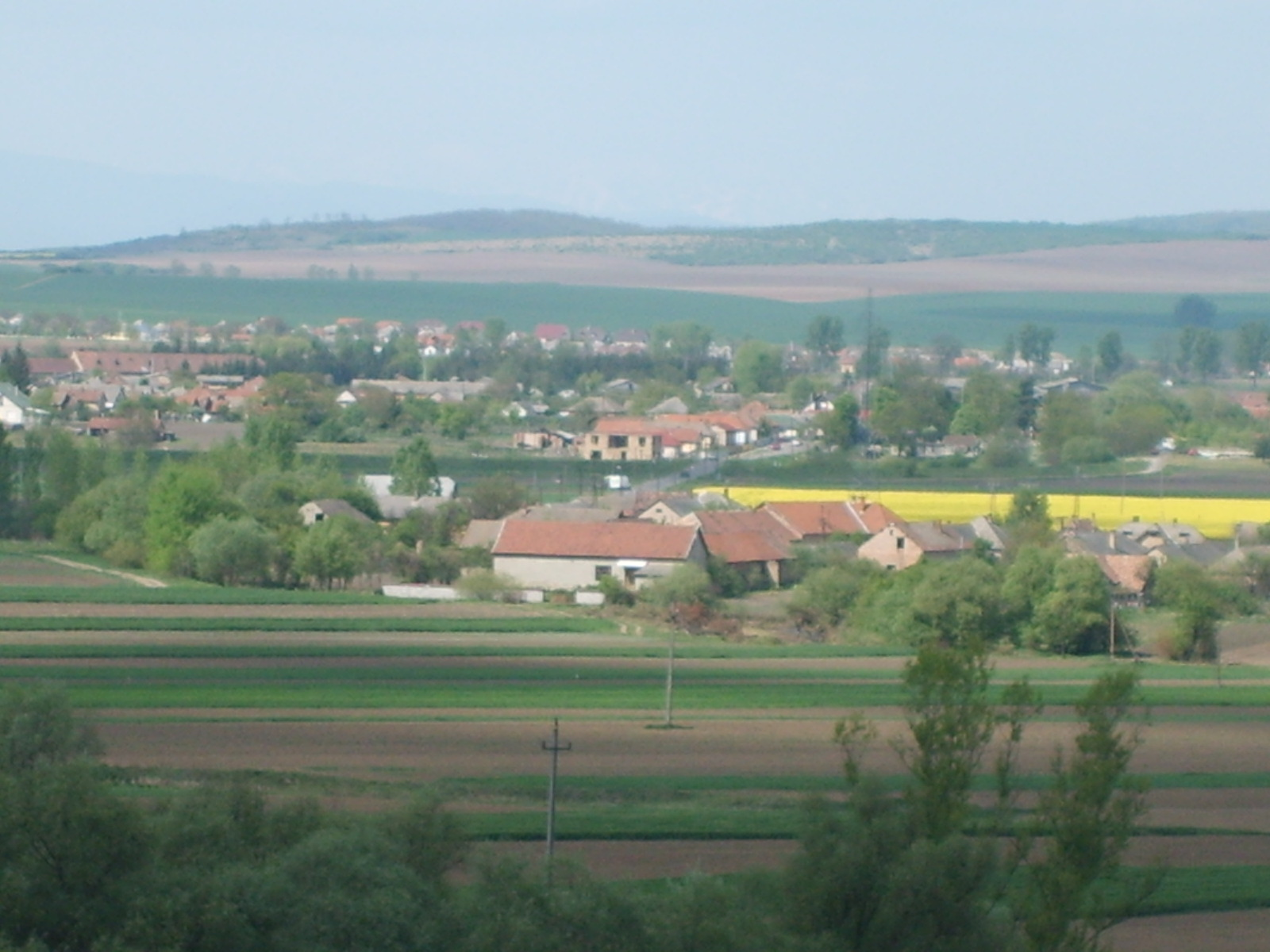
- Hét község látképe

- Coat of arms
- Interactive map of Hét
- Country: Hungary
- Regions: Northern Hungary
- County: Borsod-Abaúj-Zemplén County
- Time zone: UTC+1 (CET)
  - Summer (DST): UTC+2 (CEST)

Hét is a village in Borsod-Abaúj-Zemplén County in northeastern Hungary.
