= Sikátor =

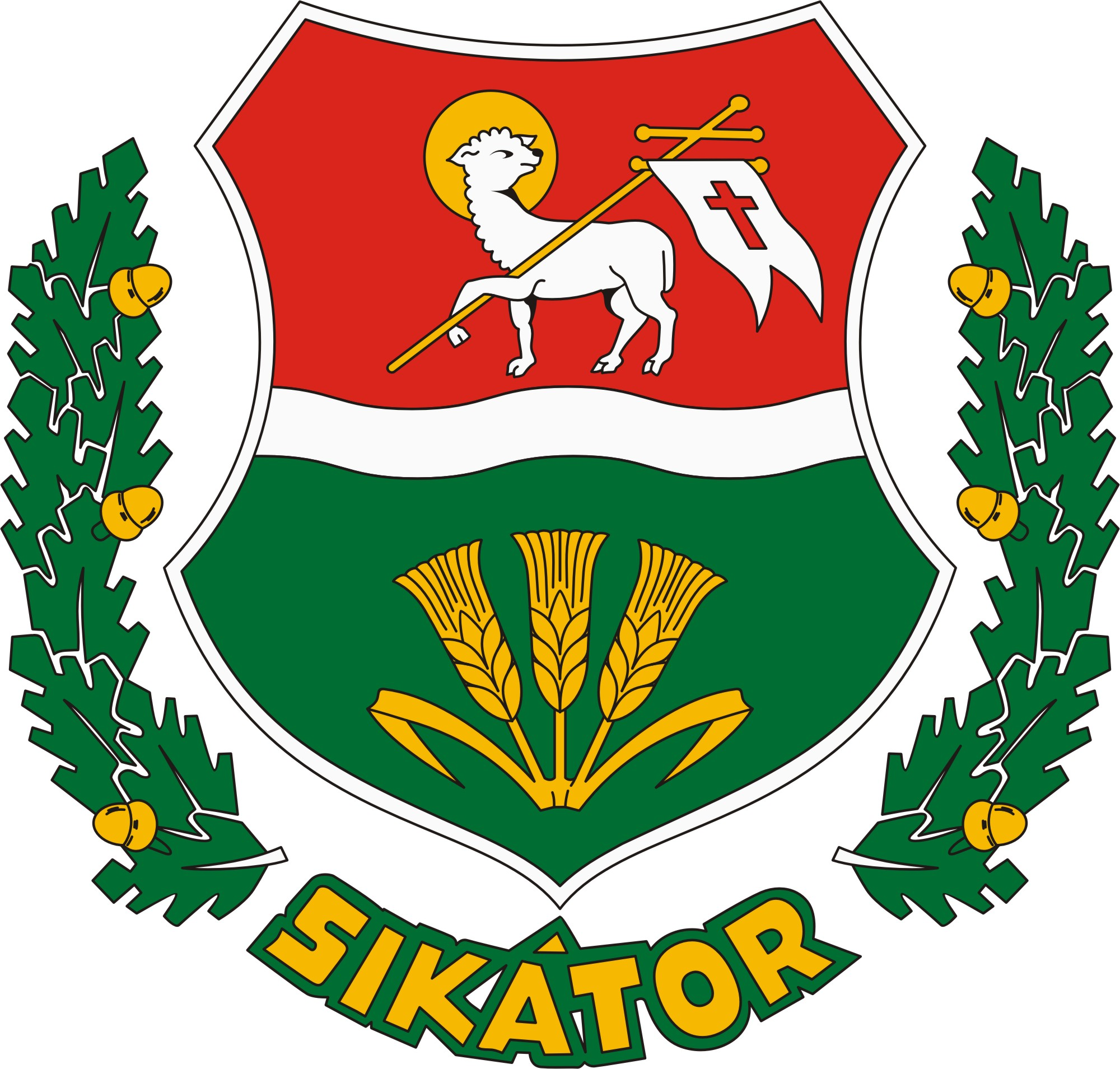
- Coat of arms

- Location of Sikátor
- Coordinates: 47.43618°N 17.85199°E
- Country: Hungary
- County: Győr-Moson-Sopron

Government
  - Mayor: Kovács József Imréné (Ind.)

Area
  - Total: 13.73 km^{2} (5.30 sq mi)

Population (2022)
  - Total: 323
  - Density: 23.5/km^{2} (60.9/sq mi)
- Time zone: UTC+1 (CET)
  - Summer (DST): UTC+2 (CEST)
- Postal code: 8439
- Area code: 88

Sikátor is a village in Győr-Moson-Sopron County, Hungary.
