= Serényfalva =

Coordinates: 48°19′N 20°24′E

- Village
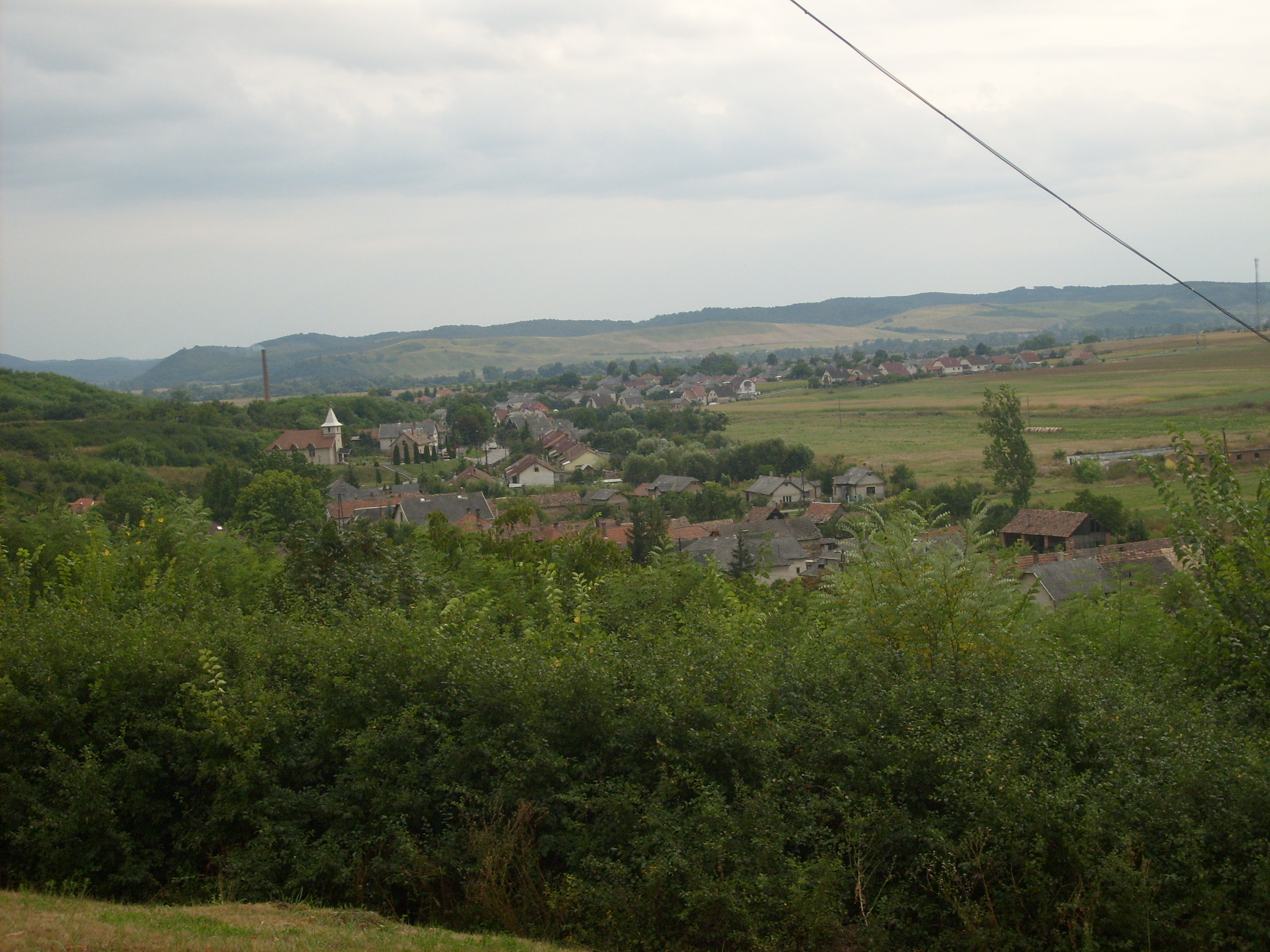
- Serényfalva
- Interactive map of Serényfalva
- Country: Hungary
- Regions: Northern Hungary
- County: Borsod-Abaúj-Zemplén County

Government

Population (2015)
  - Total: 983
  - Density: 49.8/km^{2} (129/sq mi)
- Time zone: UTC+1 (CET)
  - Summer (DST): UTC+2 (CEST)

Serényfalva is a village in Borsod-Abaúj-Zemplén County in northeastern Hungary formerly known as Málé, Serényimál and Serényifalva.

Serényfalva was first settled in the 13th century.
