= Farkaslyuk =

- Village
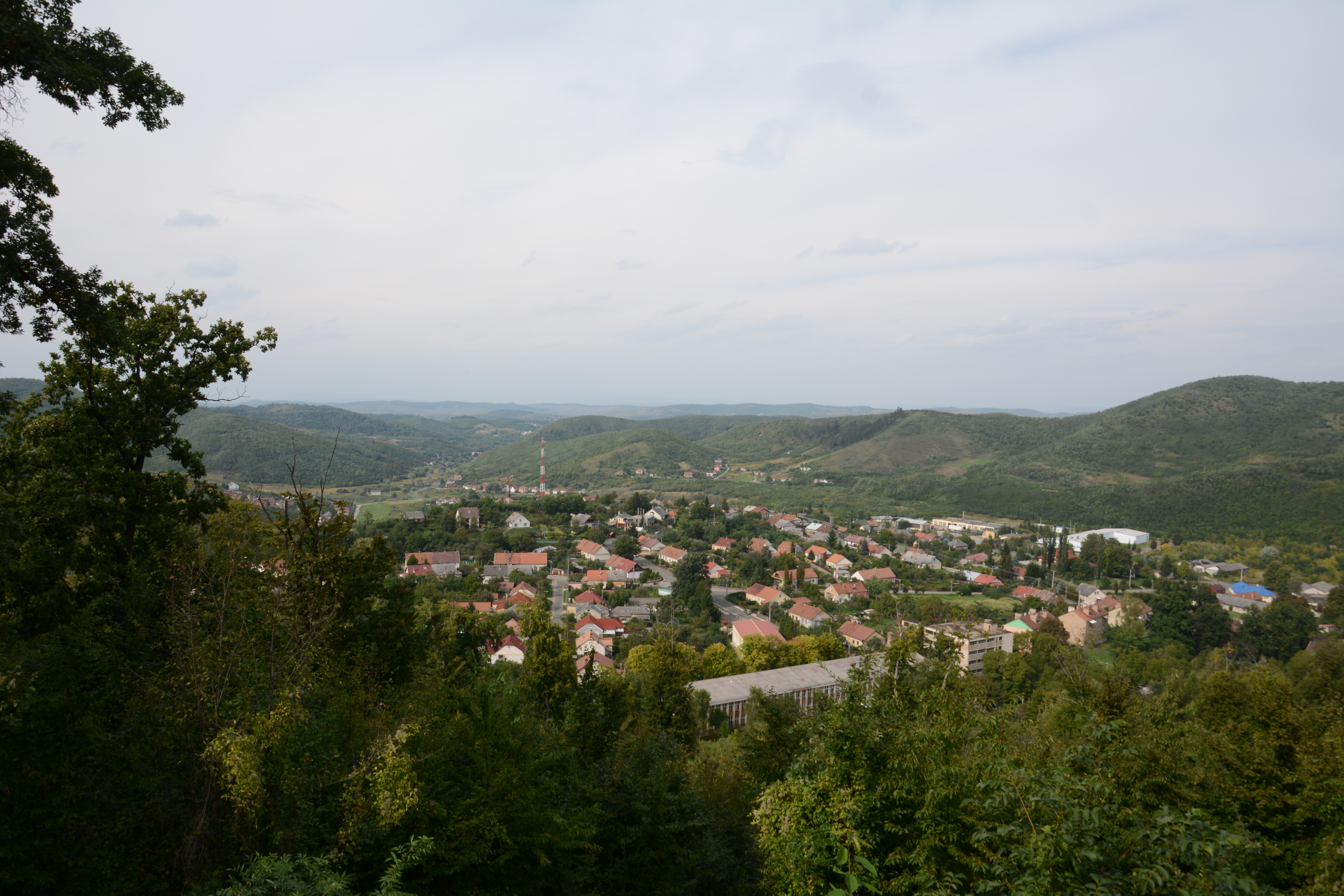

- Flag Coat of arms

- Location of Farkaslyuk
- Coordinates: 48.18651°N 20.31188°E
- Country: Hungary
- Region: Northern Hungary
- County: Borsod-Abaúj-Zemplén
- District: Ózd

Area
  - Total: 5.64 km^{2} (2.18 sq mi)

Population (1 January 2025)
  - Total: 1,890
  - Density: 335/km^{2} (868/sq mi)
- Time zone: UTC+1 (CET)
  - Summer (DST): UTC+2 (CEST)
- Postal code: 3608
- Area code: (+36) 48
- Website: farkaslyuk.hu

Farkaslyuk is a village in Borsod-Abaúj-Zemplén county, Hungary.
