= Kissikátor =

- Village
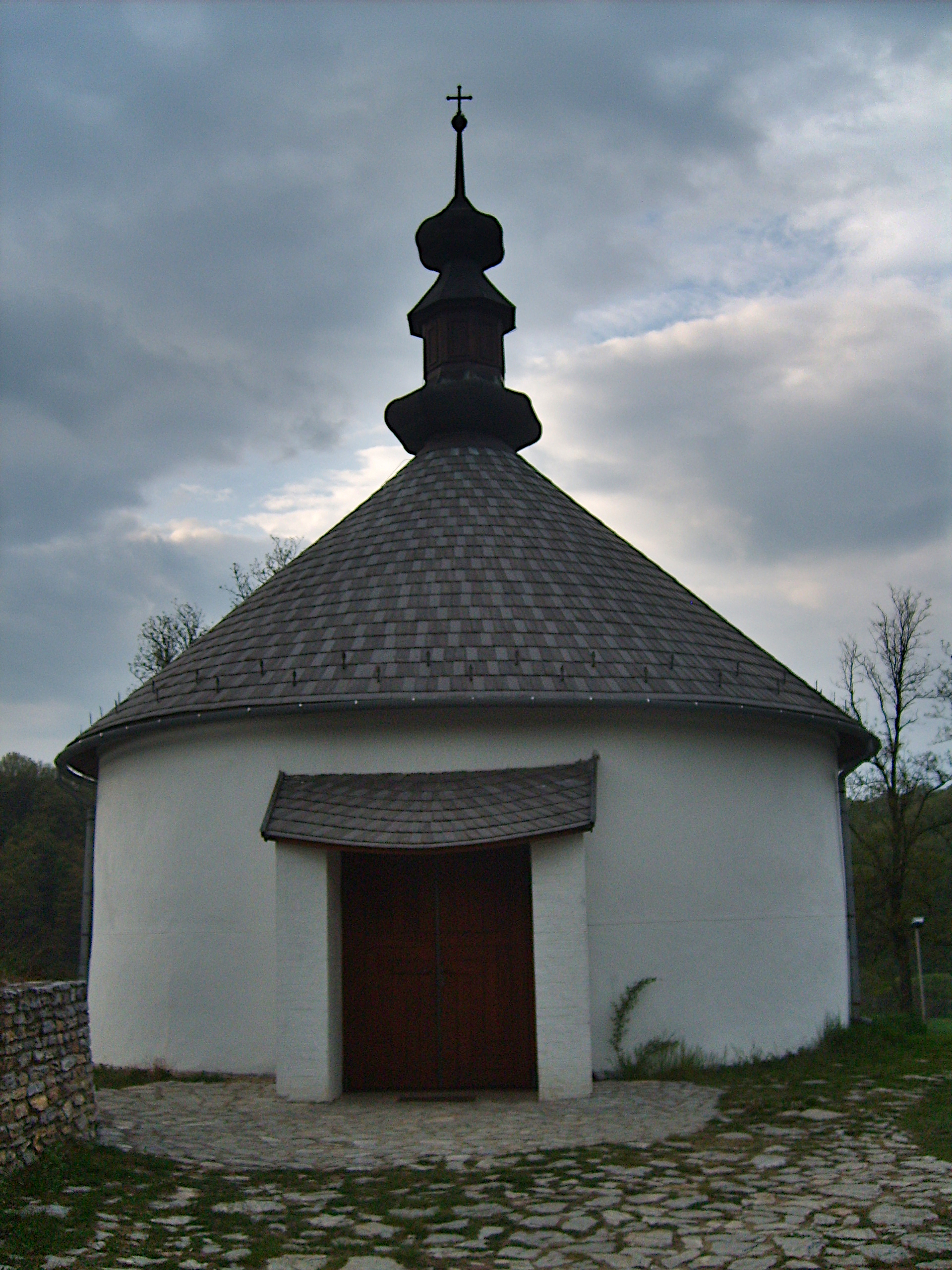

- Flag Coat of arms

- Location of Kissikátor
- Coordinates: 48.19378°N 20.13164°E
- Country: Hungary
- Region: Northern Hungary
- County: Borsod-Abaúj-Zemplén
- District: Ózd

Area
  - Total: 10.38 km^{2} (4.01 sq mi)

Population (1 January 2026)
  - Total: 271
  - Density: 26.1/km^{2} (67.6/sq mi)
- Time zone: UTC+1 (CET)
  - Summer (DST): UTC+2 (CEST)
- Postal code: 3627
- Area code: (+36) 48
- Website: www.kissikator.hu

Kissikátor is a village in Borsod-Abaúj-Zemplén County in northeastern Hungary.
