= Járdánháza =

- Village
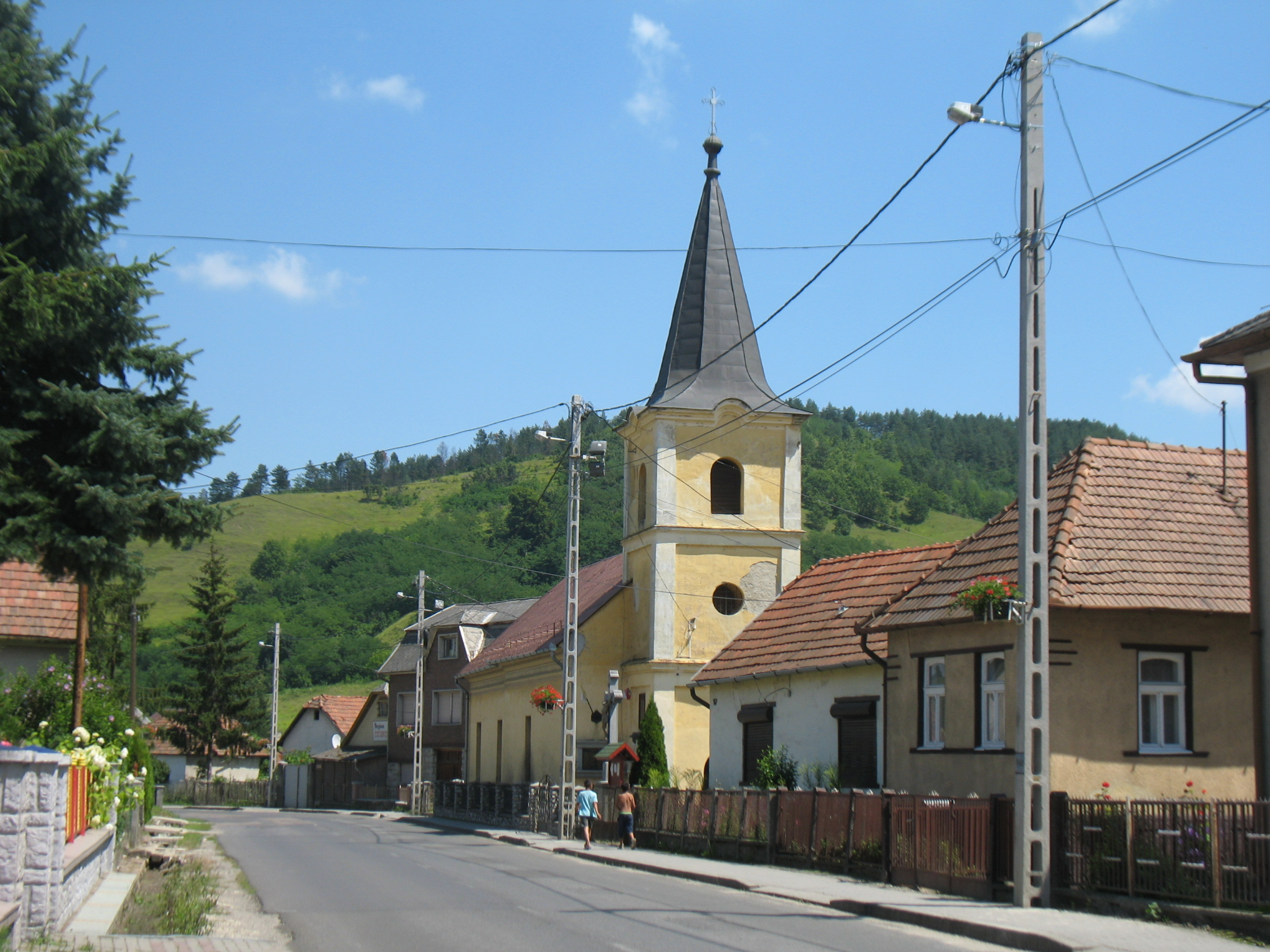

- Flag Coat of arms

- Location of Járdánháza
- Coordinates: 48.15786°N 20.25126°E
- Country: Hungary
- Region: Northern Hungary
- County: Borsod-Abaúj-Zemplén
- District: Ózd

Area
  - Total: 11.24 km^{2} (4.34 sq mi)

Population (1 January 2026)
  - Total: 1,622
  - Density: 144.3/km^{2} (373.8/sq mi)
- Time zone: UTC+1 (CET)
  - Summer (DST): UTC+2 (CEST)
- Postal code: 3664
- Area code: (+36) 48
- Website: www.jardanhaza.hu

Járdánháza is a village in Borsod-Abaúj-Zemplén County in northeastern Hungary.
