= Veľký Blh =

Veľký Blh Vámosbalog
- Municipality
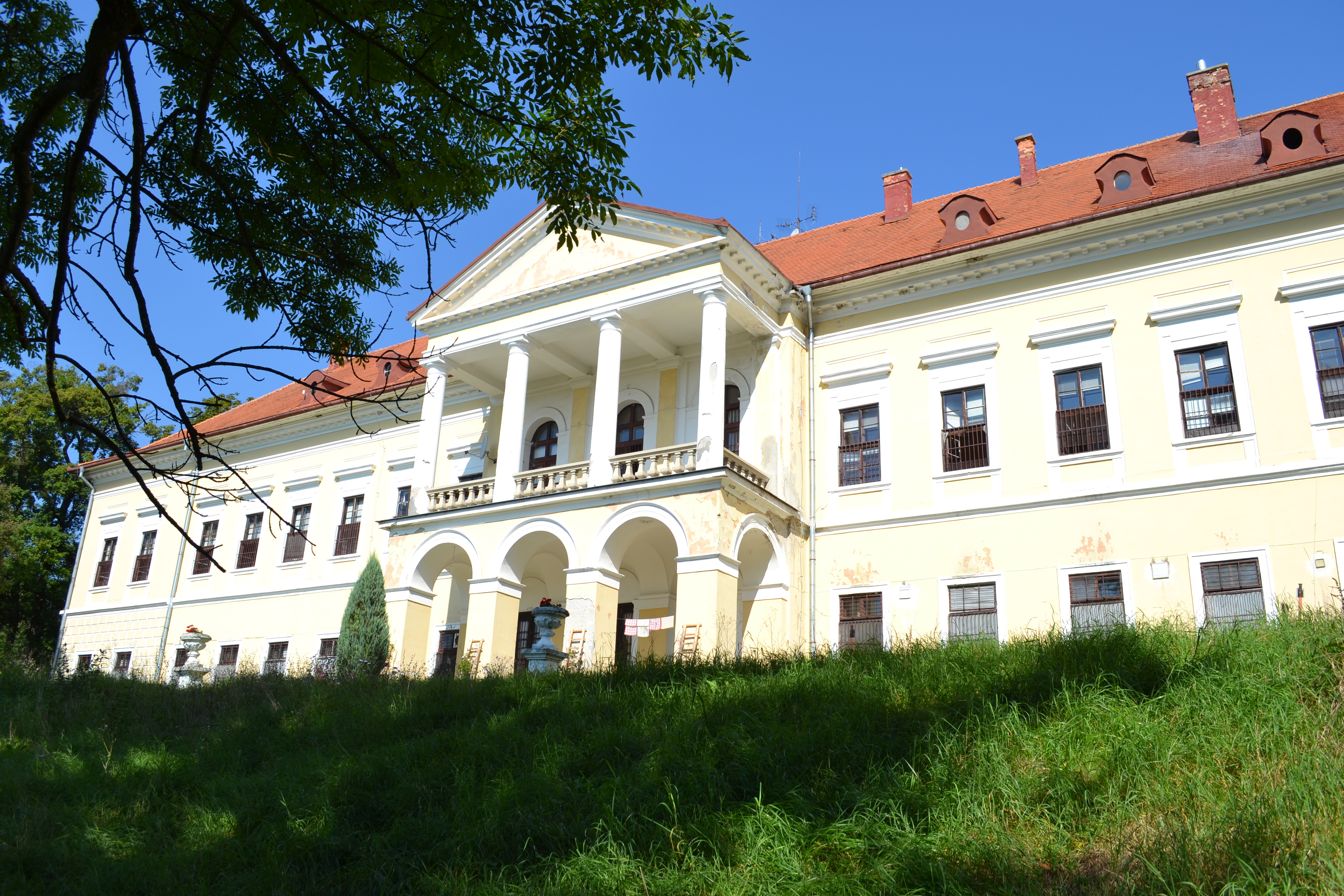
- Koháry manor

- Flag Coat of arms

- Location of Veľký Blh in the Banská Bystrica Region Location of Veľký Blh in Slovakia
- Coordinates: 48.45°N 20.12°E
- Country: Slovakia
- Region: Banská Bystrica Region
- District: Rimavská Sobota District
- First mentioned: 1331

Area
  - Total: 33.01 km^{2} (12.75 sq mi)
- Elevation: 198 m (650 ft)

Population (2025)
  - Total: 1,140
- Time zone: UTC+1 (CET)
  - Summer (DST): UTC+2 (CEST)
- Postal code: 980 22
- Area code: +421 47
- Vehicle registration plate (until 2022): RS
- Website: www.velkyblh.sk

Veľký Blh (Hungarian: Vámosbalog or Nagybalog) is a village and municipality in the Rimavská Sobota District of the Banská Bystrica Region of southern Slovakia.

== Geography ==
The municipality lies at an altitude of 198 metres (650 ft) and covers an area of 33.01 km^{2} (12.75 sq mi) (2025).

== Population ==
Population statistic (10 years)
| Year | 1995 | 2005 | 2015 | 2025 |
|---|---|---|---|---|
| Count | 1123 | 1160 | 1196 | 1140 |
| Difference | | +3.29% | +3.10% | −4.68% |

Population statistic
| Year | 2024 | 2025 |
|---|---|---|
| Count | 1144 | 1140 |
| Difference | | −0.34% |

It has a population of 1140 people (31 December 2025).

=== Ethnicity ===
Census 2021 (1+ %)
| Ethnicity | Number | Fraction |
|---|---|---|
| Hungarian | 815 | 71.93% |
| Slovak | 310 | 27.36% |
| Romani | 253 | 22.33% |
| Not found out | 40 | 3.53% |
| Total | 1133 | |

In year 2021 was 1133 people by ethnicity 815 as Hungarian, 310 as Slovak, 253 as Romani, 40 as Not found out, 5 as Czech and 1 as Other.

Note on population: The difference values of population numbers in the table "Population statistic" and in the sections "Ethnicity" & "Religion" is caused by the use of various statistical methods.

=== Religion ===
Census 2021 (1+ %)
| Religion | Number | Fraction |
|---|---|---|
| Roman Catholic Church | 433 | 38.22% |
| None | 364 | 32.13% |
| Calvinist Church | 233 | 20.56% |
| Evangelical Church | 57 | 5.03% |
| Jehovah's Witnesses | 28 | 2.47% |
| Total | 1133 | |

In year 2021 was 1133 people by religion 433 from Roman Catholic Church, 364 from None, 233 from Calvinist Church, 57 from Evangelical Church, 28 from Jehovah's Witnesses, 7 from Not found out, 3 from Greek Catholic Church, 3 from United Methodist Church, 2 from Christian Congregations in Slovakia, 1 from Old Catholic Church, 1 from Other and 1 from Church of the Brethren.
