= Dubicsány =

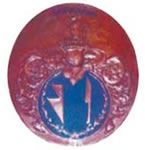
- Coat of arms

- Location of Dubicsány in Hungary
- Coordinates: 48.28470°N 20.49208°E
- Country: Hungary
- Region: Northern Hungary
- County: Borsod-Abaúj-Zemplén
- Subregion: Ózdi
- Rank: Village

Area
  - Total: 13.00 km^{2} (5.02 sq mi)

Population (1 January 2008)
  - Total: 328
  - Density: 25.2/km^{2} (65.3/sq mi)
- Time zone: UTC+1 (CET)
  - Summer (DST): UTC+2 (CEST)
- Postal code: 3635
- Area code: +36 48
- KSH code: 27669
- Website: www.dubicsany.hu

Dubicsány is a village in Borsod-Abaúj-Zemplén County, in Hungary.

== Etymology ==
The name comes from Slavic/Slovak Dubica, Dubičany (a place name derived from dub: oak) → Dubicsány. Dabachanyw (1347), Dubicha (1401).
