= Hangony =

- Village
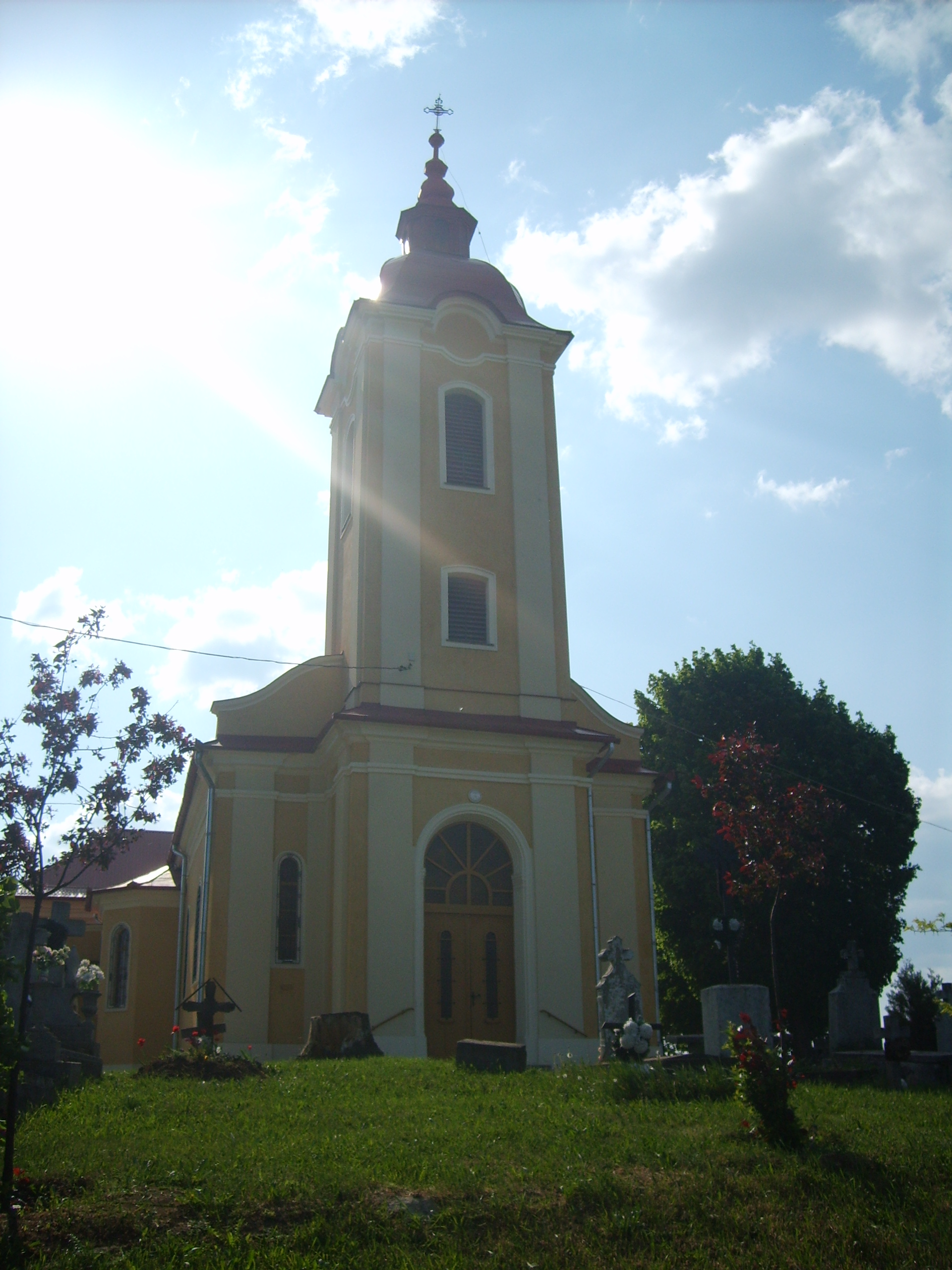

- Flag Coat of arms

- Location of Hangony
- Coordinates: 48.22932°N 20.19754°E
- Country: Hungary
- Region: Northern Hungary
- County: Borsod-Abaúj-Zemplén
- District: Ózd

Area
  - Total: 39.1 km^{2} (15.1 sq mi)

Population (1 January 2025)
  - Total: 1,386
  - Density: 35.4/km^{2} (91.8/sq mi)
- Time zone: UTC+1 (CET)
  - Summer (DST): UTC+2 (CEST)
- Postal code: 3626
- Area code: (+36) 48
- Website: www.hangony.hu

Hangony is a village in Borsod-Abaúj-Zemplén county, Hungary.
