= Bükkmogyorósd =

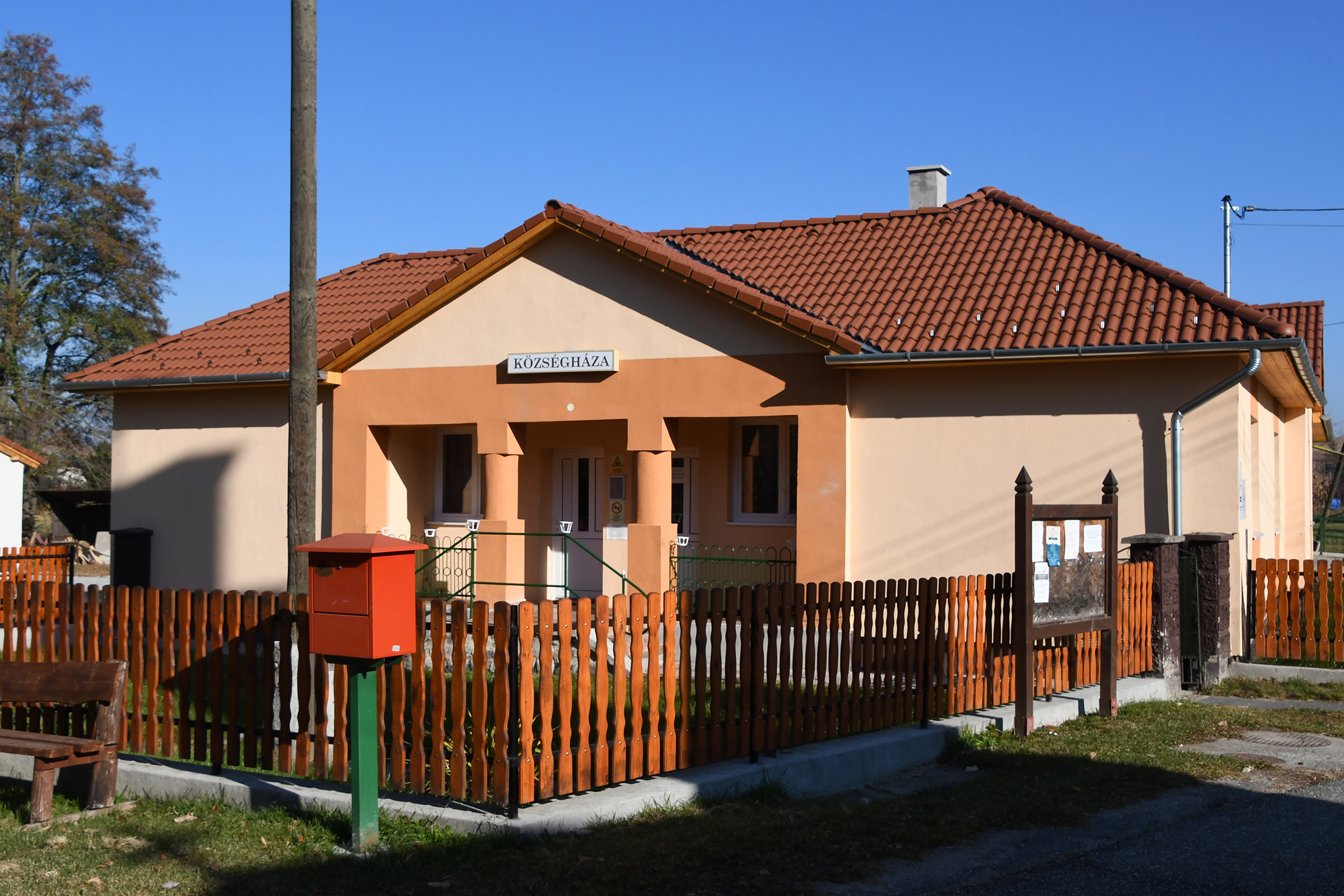
- Village hall

- Seal

- Location of Borsod-Abaúj-Zemplén county in Hungary

- Location of Bükkmogyorósd
- Coordinates: 48.12970°N 20.35579°E
- Country: Hungary
- County: Borsod-Abaúj-Zemplén

Area
  - Total: 9.9 km^{2} (3.8 sq mi)

Population (2004)
  - Total: 168
  - Density: 16.96/km^{2} (43.9/sq mi)
- Time zone: UTC+1 (CET)
  - Summer (DST): UTC+2 (CEST)
- Postal code: 3648
- Area code: 48

Bükkmogyorósd is a village in Borsod-Abaúj-Zemplén county, Hungary. It has road connection with Csernely and Szilvásvárad villages. Located at the west side of Bükk Mountains.
