= Uppony =

- Location of Borsod-Abaúj-Zemplén county in Hungary

- Location of Uppony
- Coordinates: 48.21512°N 20.43444°E
- Country: Hungary
- County: Borsod-Abaúj-Zemplén

Area
  - Total: 12.81 km^{2} (4.95 sq mi)

Population (2004)
  - Total: 358
  - Density: 27.94/km^{2} (72.4/sq mi)
- Time zone: UTC+1 (CET)
  - Summer (DST): UTC+2 (CEST)
- Postal code: 3622
- Area code: 48

Uppony is a village in Borsod-Abaúj-Zemplén county, Hungary.

Uppony is located in the north of Hungary, 45 kilometers from the county capital Miskolc.
