= Arló =

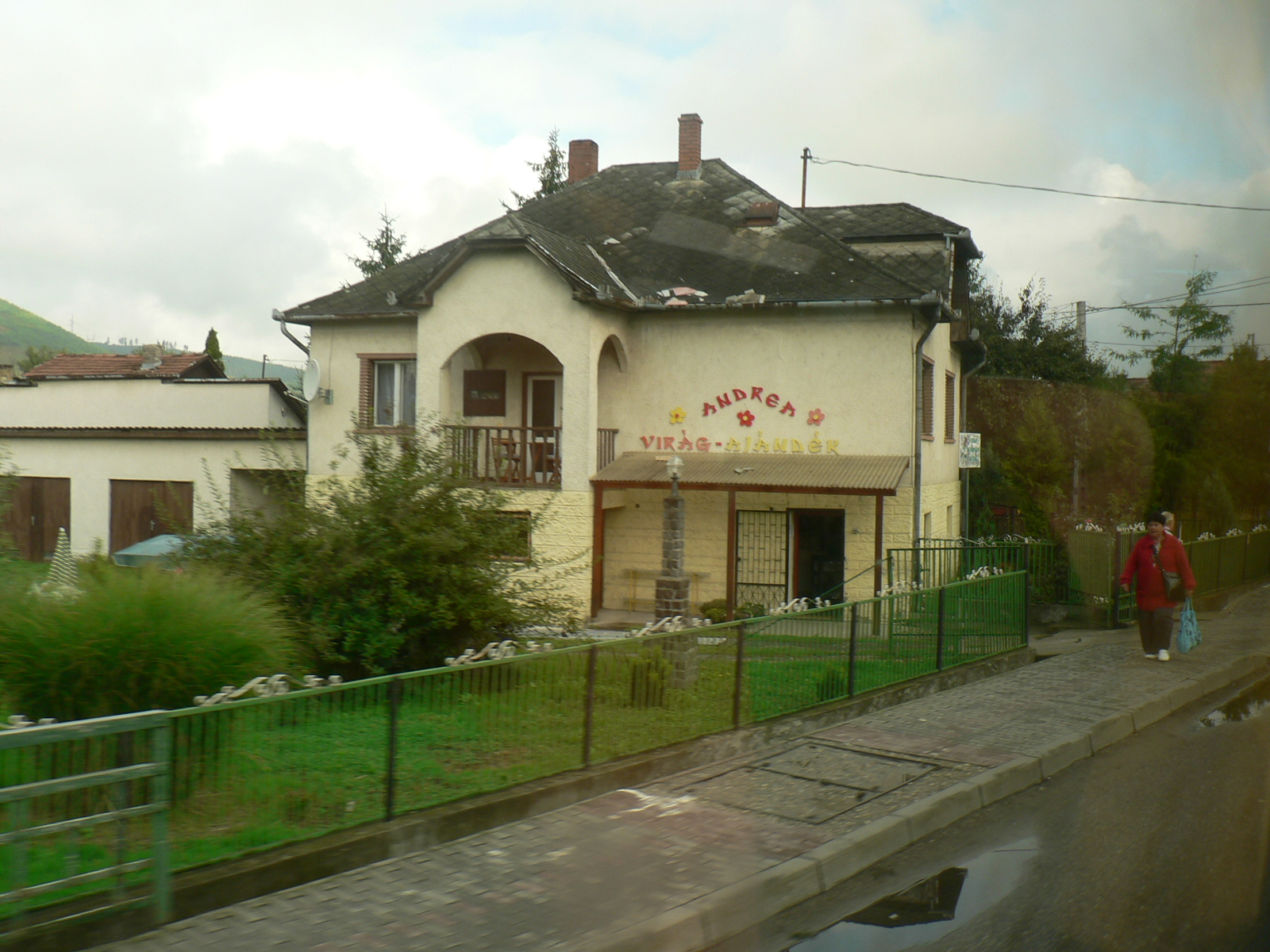

- Flag Coat of arms

- Location of Arló in Hungary
- Coordinates: 48.1728°N 20.2599°E
- Country: Hungary
- Region: Northern Hungary
- County: Borsod-Abaúj-Zemplén

Area
  - Total: 46.87 km^{2} (18.10 sq mi)

Population (2012)
  - Total: 3,686
  - Density: 78.64/km^{2} (203.7/sq mi)
- Time zone: UTC+1 (CET)
  - Summer (DST): UTC+2 (CEST)
- Postal code: 3663
- Area code: +36 48
- Website: http://www.arlo.hu

Arló is a village in Borsod-Abaúj-Zemplén county, Hungary.

In the 19th and 20th centuries, a Jewish community lived in the village. In 1920, there were 53 Jews in the village In 1944, most of the village's Jews were murdered in the Holocaust.

The village still has a Jewish cemetery.
