= Domaháza =

- Village
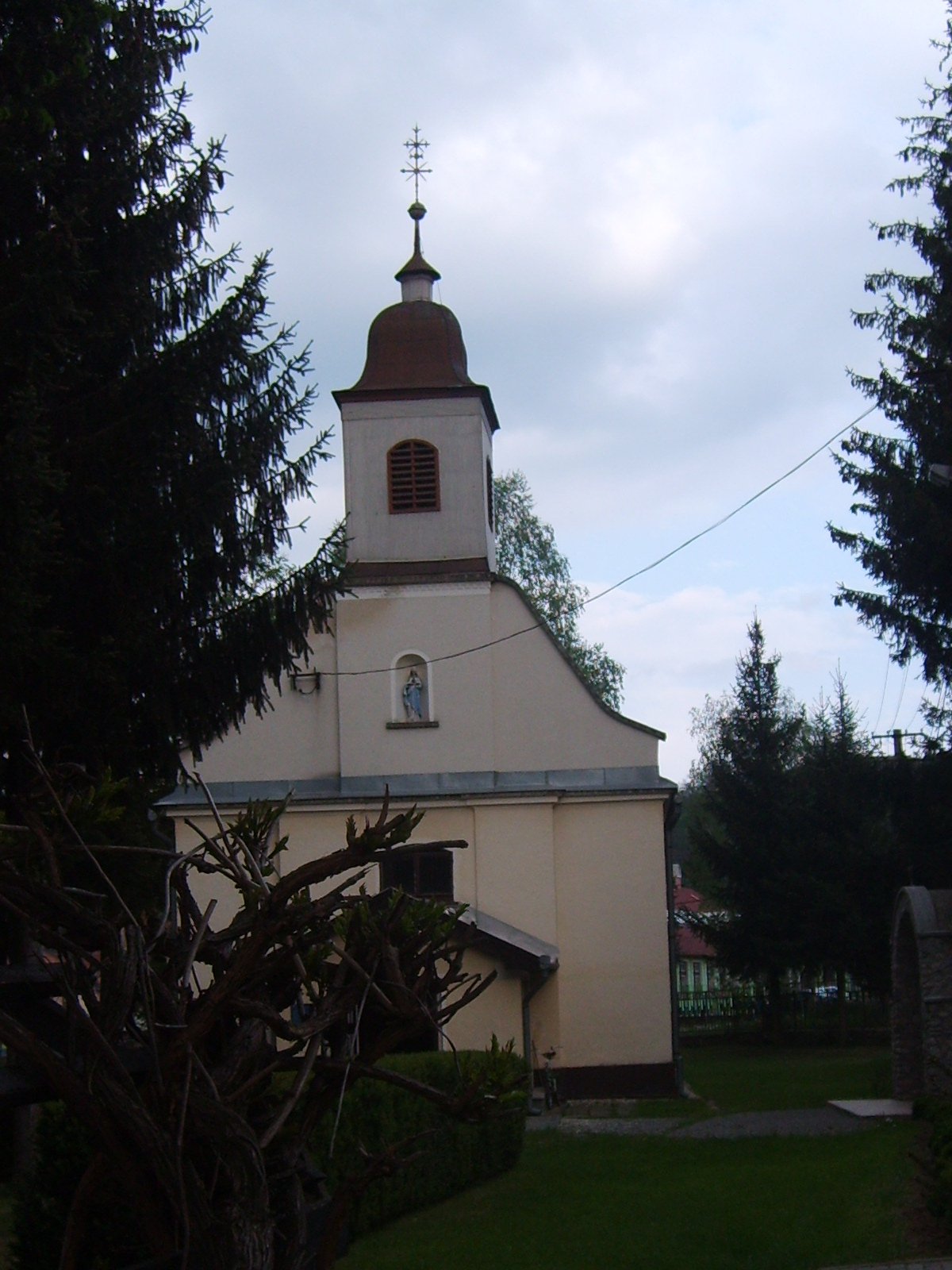

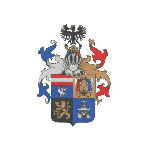
- Seal

- Location within Hungary
- Coordinates: 48°10′55.27″N 20°6′17.86″E
- Country: Hungary
- Regions: Northern Hungary
- County: Borsod-Abaúj-Zemplén County

Area
  - Total: 28.82 km^{2} (11.13 sq mi)

Population (2008)
  - Total: 903
- Time zone: UTC+1 (CET)
  - Summer (DST): UTC+2 (CEST)

Domaháza is a village in Borsod-Abaúj-Zemplén County in northeastern Hungary. As of 2008 it had a population of 903.
