= Borsodszentgyörgy =

- Seal

- Location of Borsod-Abaúj-Zemplén county in Hungary

- Location of Borsodszentgyörgy
- Coordinates: 48.18964°N 20.20894°E
- Country: Hungary
- County: Borsod-Abaúj-Zemplén

Area
  - Total: 21.53 km^{2} (8.31 sq mi)

Population (2004)
  - Total: 1,321
  - Density: 61.35/km^{2} (158.9/sq mi)
- Time zone: UTC+1 (CET)
  - Summer (DST): UTC+2 (CEST)
- Postal code: 3623
- Area code: 48

Borsodszentgyörgy is a village in Borsod-Abaúj-Zemplén county, Hungary.
