= Borsodbóta =

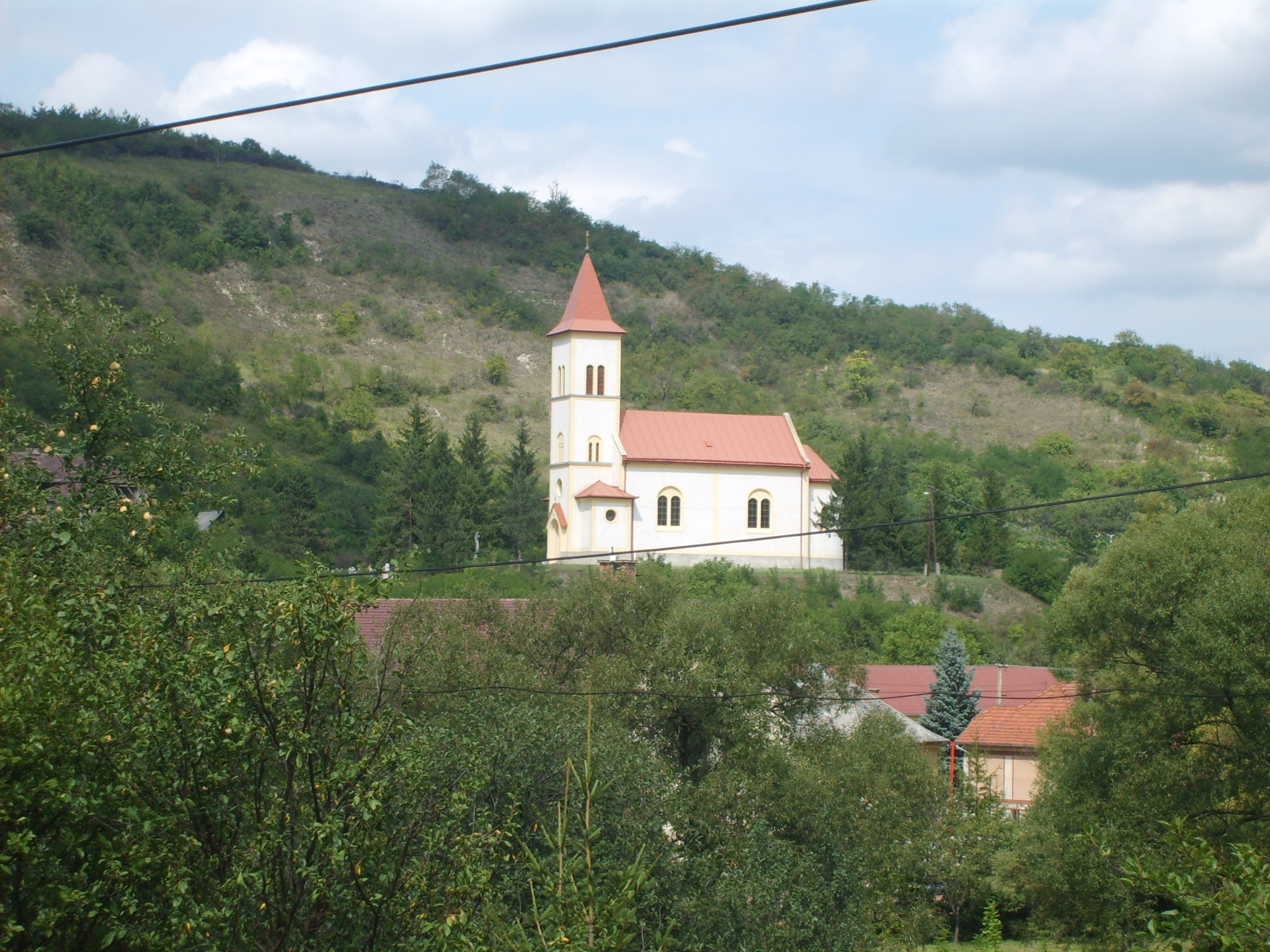

- Coat of arms

- Location of Borsod-Abaúj-Zemplén county in Hungary

- Location of Borsodbóta
- Coordinates: 48.21105°N 20.39533°E
- Country: Hungary
- County: Borsod-Abaúj-Zemplén

Area
  - Total: 8.13 km^{2} (3.14 sq mi)

Population (2004)
  - Total: 940
  - Density: 115.62/km^{2} (299.5/sq mi)
- Time zone: UTC+1 (CET)
  - Summer (DST): UTC+2 (CEST)
- Postal code: 3658
- Area code: 48

Borsodbóta is a village in Borsod-Abaúj-Zemplén, Hungary, located in the north of the country.
