= Csokvaomány =

- Village
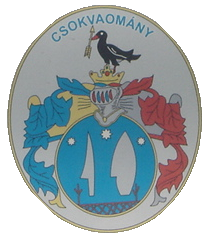
- Seal

- Location within Hungary
- Coordinates: 48°10′0.19″N 20°22′38.82″E
- Country: Hungary
- Regions: Northern Hungary
- County: Borsod-Abaúj-Zemplén County

Area
  - Total: 15.01 km^{2} (5.80 sq mi)

Population (2008)
  - Total: 880
- Time zone: UTC+1 (CET)
  - Summer (DST): UTC+2 (CEST)

Csokvaomány is a village in Borsod-Abaúj-Zemplén County in northeastern Hungary. As of 2008, the village had a population of 880. The closest town is Ózd (20 km).

== History ==
The first mention of "Csokva" and "Omány" villages from the era of Árpád dynasty. During the Turkish invasion, the villages were burned. In 1943 the two villages joined as Csokvaomány.
