= Ózd =

- Town
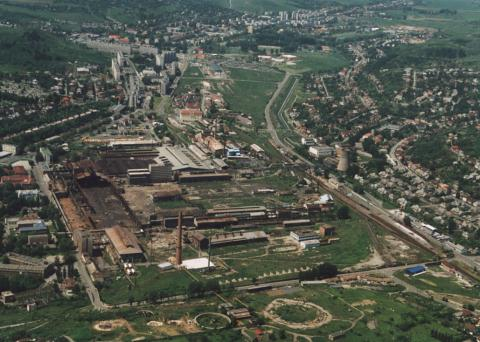
- Aerial view

- Flag

- Location within Hungary Location within Europe
- Coordinates: 48°13′N 20°18′E
- Country: Hungary
- County: Borsod-Abaúj-Zemplén
- District: Ózd

Area
  - Total: 91.56 km^{2} (35.35 sq mi)

Population (2017)
  - Total: 32,827
  - Density: 358.5/km^{2} (928.6/sq mi)
- Time zone: UTC+1 (CET)
  - Summer (DST): UTC+2 (CEST)
- Postal code: 3600
- Area code: (+36) 48
- Website: ozd.hu

Ózd (Hungarian: [oːzd]) is a town in Borsod-Abaúj-Zemplén county, Northern Hungary, 40 km (25 mi) from the county seat of Miskolc. Ózd is the second largest municipality in the county.

== History ==
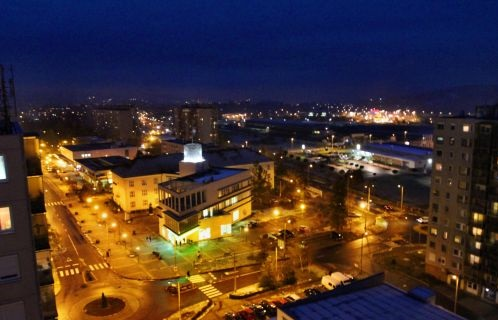
Ózd

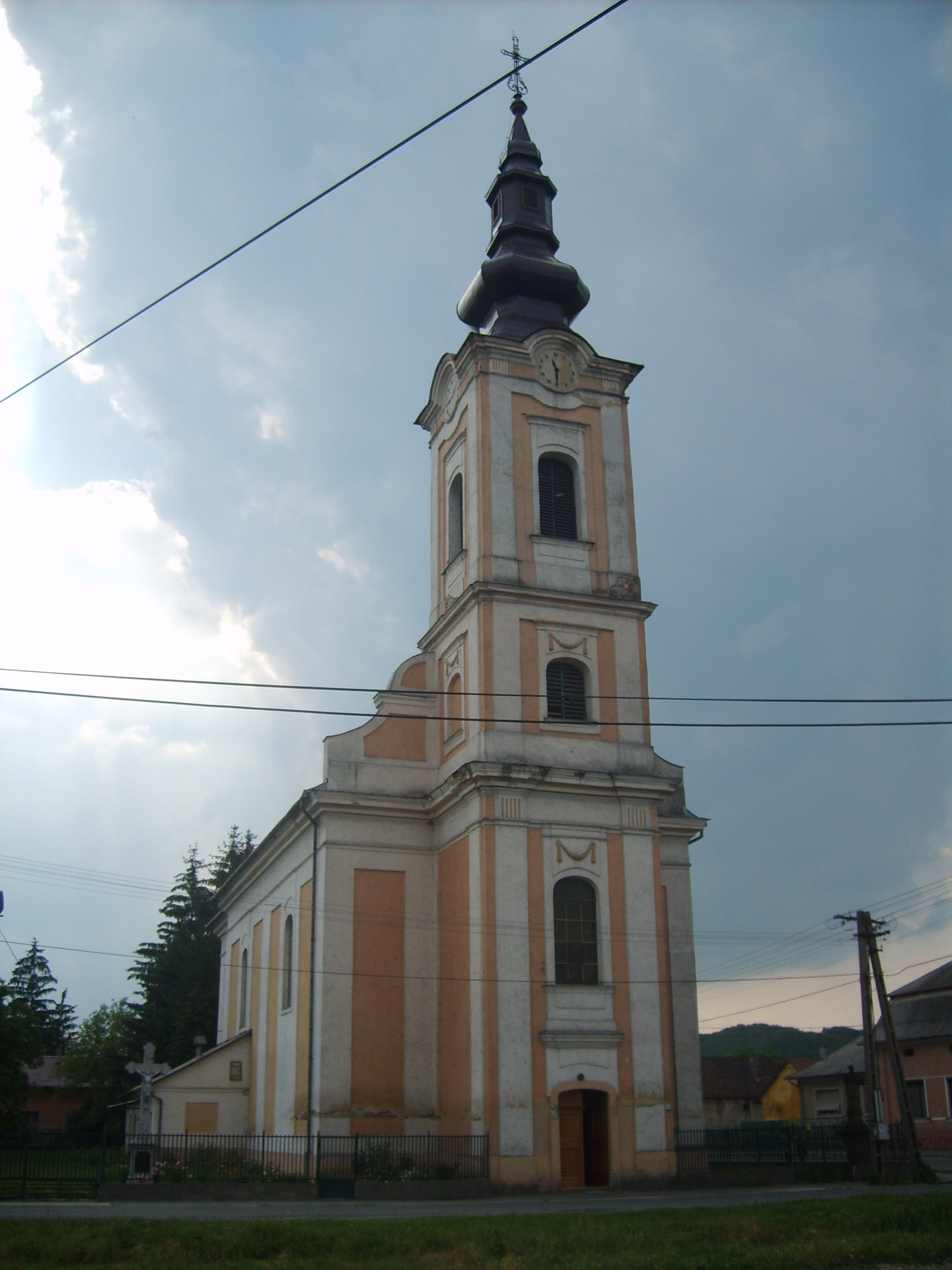
Saint Nicholas Church

The area has been inhabited since ancient times. The village of Ózd was first mentioned in 1272. The modern city came into being with the unification of the towns Ózd, Bolyok and Sajóvárkony during the socialist era of Hungary, when the northern part of the country was developed into a centre of heavy industry. Ózd has a Roma population of 1,025 persons.

== Sport ==
The most popular sport in Ózd is football. Ózd's most successful football team was the Ózdi Kohász SE which played in the Nemzeti Bajnokság I, the top level league in Hungary. However, the club dissolved in 2003.

== Twin towns – sister cities ==
Ózd is twinned with:

- Bichiș, Romania
- Chorzów, Poland
- Neaua, Romania
- Rimavská Sobota, Slovakia
- Veľký Blh, Slovakia
