= List of populated places in Hungary (S) =

This is a list of cities, towns and villages of Hungary

KEY: T = Town ; V = Village

Name	Rank	County	District	Population	Post code
Ságújfalu	V	Nógrád	Salgótarjáni	1,028	3162
Ságvár	V	Somogy	Siófoki	1,790	8654
Sajóbábony	V	Borsod-Abaúj-Zemplén	Miskolci	3,140	3792
Sajóecseg	V	Borsod-Abaúj-Zemplén	Miskolci	1,055	3793
Sajógalgóc	V	Borsod-Abaúj-Zemplén	Kazincbarcikai	400	3636
Sajóhidvég	V	Borsod-Abaúj-Zemplén	Miskolci	1,100	3576
Sajóivánka	V	Borsod-Abaúj-Zemplén	Kazincbarcikai	619	3720
Sajókápolna	V	Borsod-Abaúj-Zemplén	Miskolci	441	3773
Sajókaza	V	Borsod-Abaúj-Zemplén	Kazincbarcikai	3,636	3720
Sajókeresztúr	V	Borsod-Abaúj-Zemplén	Miskolci	1,538	3791
Sajólád	V	Borsod-Abaúj-Zemplén	Miskolci	3,074	3572
Sajólászlófalva	V	Borsod-Abaúj-Zemplén	Miskolci	462	3773
Sajómercse	V	Borsod-Abaúj-Zemplén	Ózdi	276	3656
Sajónémeti	V	Borsod-Abaúj-Zemplén	Ózdi	596	3652
Sajóörös	V	Borsod-Abaúj-Zemplén	Tiszaújvárosi	1,176	3586
Sajópálfala	V	Borsod-Abaúj-Zemplén	Miskolci	809	3714
Sajópetri	V	Borsod-Abaúj-Zemplén	Miskolci	1,510	3573
Sajópüspöki	V	Borsod-Abaúj-Zemplén	Ózdi	588	3653
Sajósenye	V	Borsod-Abaúj-Zemplén	Miskolci	452	3712
Sajószentpéter	T	Borsod-Abaúj-Zemplén	Miskolci	13,252	3770
Sajószöged	V	Borsod-Abaúj-Zemplén	Tiszaújvárosi	2,355	3599
Sajóvámos	V	Borsod-Abaúj-Zemplén	Miskolci	2,250	3712
Sajóvelezd	V	Borsod-Abaúj-Zemplén	Ózdi	909	3656
Sajtoskál	V	Tolna	Csepregi	442	9632
Salföld	V	Veszprém	Tapolcai	62	8256
Salgótarján	county seat	Nógrád	Salgótarjáni	44,423	3100
Salköveskút	V	Tolna	Szombathelyi	432	9742
Salomvár	V	Zala	Zalaegerszegi	596	8995
Sály	V	Borsod-Abaúj-Zemplén	Mezokövesdi	2,234	3425
Sámod	V	Baranya	Sellyei	226	7841
Sámsonháza	V	Nógrád	Bátonyterenyei	286	3074
Sand	V	Zala	Nagykanizsai	482	8824
Sándorfalva	V	Csongrád	Szegedi	7,954	6762
Sántos	V	Somogy	Kaposvári	591	7479
Sáp	V	Hajdú-Bihar	Püspökladányi	1,046	4176
Sáránd	V	Hajdú-Bihar	Derecske–Létavértesi	2,327	4272
Sárazsadány	V	Borsod-Abaúj-Zemplén	Sárospataki	262	3942
Sárbogárd	T	Fejér	Sárbogárdi	13,432	7000
Sáregres	V	Fejér	Sárbogárdi	821	7014
Sárfimizdó	V	Tolna	Vasvári	108	9813
Sárhida	V	Zala	Zalaegerszegi	812	8944
Sárisáp	V	Komárom-Esztergom	Dorogi	2,949	2523
Sarkad	T	Békés	Sarkadi	10,985	5720
Sarkadkeresztúr	V	Békés	Sarkadi	1,863	5731
Sárkeresztes	V	Fejér	Székesfehérvári	1,478	8051
Sárkeresztúr	V	Fejér	Abai	2,516	8125
Sárkeszi	V	Fejér	Székesfehérvári	591	8144
Sármellék	V	Zala	Keszthely–Hévízi	1,848	8391
Sárok	V	Baranya	Mohácsi	168	7781
Sárosd	V	Fejér	Abai	3,473	2433
Sárospatak	T	Borsod-Abaúj-Zemplén	Sárospataki	14,505	3950
Sárpilis	V	Tolna	Szekszárdi	707	7145
Sárrétudvari	V	Hajdú-Bihar	Püspökladányi	3,063	4171
Sarród	V	Gyor-Moson-Sopron	Sopron–Fertodi	1,000	9435
Sárszentágota	V	Fejér	Abai	1,391	8126
Sárszentlorinc	V	Tolna	Paksi	1,033	7047
Sárszentmihály	V	Fejér	Székesfehérvári	2,833	8143
Sarud	V	Heves	Füzesabonyi	5,164	3386
Sárvár	T	Tolna	Sárvári	15,545	9600
Sásd	T	Baranya	Sásdi	3,548	7370
Sáska	V	Veszprém	Tapolcai	277	8308
Sáta	V	Borsod-Abaúj-Zemplén	Ózdi	1,395	3659
Sátoraljaújhely	T	Borsod-Abaúj-Zemplén	Sátoraljaújhelyi	17,992	3980
Sátorhely	V	Baranya	Mohácsi	710	7785
Sávoly	V	Somogy	Marcali	529	8732
Sé	V	Tolna	Szombathelyi	1,156	9789
Segesd	V	Somogy	Nagyatádi	2,694	7562
Selyeb	V	Borsod-Abaúj-Zemplén	Szikszói	495	3809
Sellye	T	Baranya	Sellyei	3,096	7960
Semjén	V	Borsod-Abaúj-Zemplén	Bodrogközi	447	3974
Semjénháza	V	Zala	Letenyei	704	8862
Sénye	V	Zala	Zalaszentgróti	42	8788
Sényo	V	Szabolcs-Szatmár-Bereg	Nyíregyházai	1,399	4533
Seregélyes	V	Fejér	Abai	4,642	8111
Serényfalva	V	Borsod-Abaúj-Zemplén	Ózdi	1,101	3729
Sérsekszolos	V	Somogy	Tabi	161	8660
Sikátor	V	Gyor-Moson-Sopron	Pannonhalmi	341	8439
Siklós	T	Baranya	Siklósi	10,292	7800
Siklósbodony	V	Baranya	Siklósi	142	7814
Siklósnagyfalu	V	Baranya	Siklósi	433	7823
Sima	V	Borsod-Abaúj-Zemplén	Abaúj–Hegyközi	23	3881
Simaság	V	Tolna	Csepregi	624	9633
Simonfa	V	Somogy	Kaposvári	413	7474
Simontornya	T	Tolna	Tamási	4,608	7081
Sióagárd	V	Tolna	Szekszárdi	1,420	7171
Siófok	T	Somogy	Siófoki	23,622	8600
Siójut	V	Somogy	Siófoki	545	8652
Sirok	V	Heves	Pétervásárai	6,339	3332
Sitke	V	Tolna	Sárvári	681	9671
Sobor	V	Gyor-Moson-Sopron	Téti	327	9315
Sokorópátka	V	Gyor-Moson-Sopron	Téti	1,061	9112
Solt	T	Bács-Kiskun	Kalocsai	7,087	6320
Soltszentimre	V	Bács-Kiskun	Kiskorösi	1,438	6223
Soltvadkert	T	Bács-Kiskun	Kiskorösi	7,771	6230
Sóly	V	Veszprém	Veszprémi	406	8193
Solymár	V	Pest	Pilisvörösvári	9,118	2083
Som	V	Somogy	Siófoki	719	8655
Somberek	V	Baranya	Mohácsi	1,550	7728
Somlójeno	V	Veszprém	Ajkai	313	8478
Somlószolos	V	Veszprém	Ajkai	711	8483
Somlóvásárhely	V	Veszprém	Ajkai	1,125	8481
Somlóvecse	V	Veszprém	Ajkai	97	8484
Somodor	V	Somogy	Kaposvári	444	7454
Somogyacsa	V	Somogy	Tabi	229	7283
Somogyapáti	V	Baranya	Szigetvári	567	7922
Somogyaracs	V	Somogy	Barcsi	232	7584
Somogyaszaló	V	Somogy	Kaposvári	786	7452
Somogybabod	V	Somogy	Fonyódi	523	8684
Somogybükkösd	V	Somogy	Csurgói	117	8858
Somogycsicsó	V	Somogy	Csurgói	230	8726
Somogydöröcske	V	Somogy	Tabi	196	7284
Somogyegres	V	Somogy	Tabi	238	8660
Somogyfajsz	V	Somogy	Marcali	548	8708
Somogygeszti	V	Somogy	Kaposvári	592	7455
Somogyhárságy	V	Baranya	Szigetvári	500	7925
Somogyhatvan	V	Baranya	Szigetvári	407	7921
Somogyjád	V	Somogy	Kaposvári	1,645	7443
Somogymeggyes	V	Somogy	Tabi	597	8673
Somogysámson	V	Somogy	Marcali	810	8733
Somogysárd	V	Somogy	Kaposvári	1,361	7435
Somogysimonyi	V	Somogy	Marcali	85	8737
Somogyszentpál	V	Somogy	Marcali	807	8705
Somogyszil	V	Somogy	Kaposvári	827	7276
Somogyszob	V	Somogy	Nagyatádi	1,773	7563
Somogytúr	V	Somogy	Fonyódi	430	8683
Somogyudvarhely	V	Somogy	Csurgói	1,202	7515
Somogyvámos	V	Somogy	Lengyeltóti	806	8699
Somogyvár	V	Somogy	Lengyeltóti	2,013	8698
Somogyviszló	V	Baranya	Szigetvári	272	7922
Somogyzsitfa	V	Somogy	Marcali	662	8734
Sonkád	V	Szabolcs-Szatmár-Bereg	Fehérgyarmati	717	4954
Soponya	V	Fejér	Abai	2,057	8123
Sopron	city w. county rights	Gyor-Moson-Sopron	Sopron–Fertodi	55,932	9400
Sopronhorpács	V	Gyor-Moson-Sopron	Sopron–Fertodi	859	9463
Sopronkövesd	V	Gyor-Moson-Sopron	Sopron–Fertodi	1,213	9483
Sopronnémeti	V	Gyor-Moson-Sopron	Csornai	285	9325
Sorkifalud	V	Tolna	Szombathelyi	676	9774
Sorkikápolna	V	Tolna	Szombathelyi	266	9774
Sormás	V	Zala	Nagykanizsai	911	8881
Sorokpolány	V	Tolna	Szombathelyi	842	9773
Sóshartyán	V	Nógrád	Salgótarjáni	958	3131
Sóskút	V	Fejér	Váli	2,975	2038
Sóstófalva	V	Borsod-Abaúj-Zemplén	Szerencsi	305	3716
Sósvertike	V	Baranya	Sellyei	218	7960
Sótony	V	Tolna	Sárvári	696	9681
Söjtör	V	Zala	Zalaegerszegi	1,628	8897
Söpte	V	Tolna	Szombathelyi	821	9743
Söréd	V	Fejér	Móri	440	8072
Sukoró	V	Fejér	Gárdonyi	923	8096
Sumony	V	Baranya	Szentlorinci	508	7960
Súr	V	Komárom-Esztergom	Kisbéri	1,332	2889
Surd	V	Zala	Nagykanizsai	690	8856
Sükösd	V	Bács-Kiskun	Bajai	4,025	6346
Sülysáp	V	Pest	Monori	7,832	2241
Sümeg	T	Veszprém	Sümegi	6,784	8330
Sümegcsehi	V	Zala	Zalaszentgróti	647	8357
Sümegprága	V	Veszprém	Sümegi	692	8351
Sütto	V	Komárom-Esztergom	Esztergomi	2,011	2543

== Notes ==
- Cities marked with * have several different post codes, the one here is only the most general one.
