= Miskolc metropolitan area =

Miskolc Metropolitan Area
- Metropolitan area
- Country: Hungary
- Region: Northern Hungary
- County: Borsod-Abaúj-Zemplén County

Area
  - Total: 44,085 km^{2} (17,021 sq mi)

Population
  - Total: 205,626▼
  - Density: 466.4/km^{2} (1,208/sq mi)
- Time zone: UTC+1 (CET)
  - Summer (DST): UTC+2 (CEST)

The Miskolc Metropolitan Area (Hungarian: Miskolci agglomeráció) is a metropolitan area in Northern Hungary . The agglomeration consists of 13 municipalities: 4 cities 2 "big" villages and 7 villages . It has a population of 205.626 ▼ (2012).( This is Hungary's second most populous agglomeration after the Budapest agglomeration ) . Area : 44,085 square kilometres (17,021 sq mi) ▲, The population density 466,4/km^{2} ▼ was in 2012 . For the county's population 30% lives in this agglomeration.

== Settlements of the Miskolc metropolitan area ==
- Alsózsolca (city)
- Arnót (village)
- Felsőzsolca (city)
- Kistokaj (village)
- Mályi (village)
- Miskolc (county seat, regional city)
- Onga ("big" village)
- Sajóbábony (city)
- Sajóecseg (village)
- Sajókeresztúr (village)
- Sajópálfala (village)
- Sajóvámos (village)
- Szirmabesenyő ("big" village)

== Data ==
Name	Population (2012)	Area	Population density	The Hungarian's proportion	Birth Rate (2010)	Mortality Rate (2010)	Number of houses (2012)
Miskolc	166,823 (2012) ▼	236,66 km^{2}	704,9/km^{2} ▼	95 %	8,6 ▼	14,2 ▼	76,091 ▲
Felsőzsolca	6,750 (2012) ▼	016,25 km^{2}	415,3/km^{2} ▼	91 %	11,4 ▼	10,3 ▲	2,200 ▲
Alsózsolca	5,937 (2012) ▼	026,02 km^{2}	228,1/km^{2} ▼	85 %	11,5 ▲	10,4 ▼	1,855 ▲
Onga	4,775 (2012) ▼	031,49 km^{2}	151,6/km^{2} ▼	83 %	12,7 ▲	10,6 ▼	1,544 ▲
Szirmabesenyő	4,344 (2012) ▼	015,75 km^{2}	275,8/km^{2} ▼	98 %	5,4 ▼	14,8 ▲	1,634 ▲
Mályi	4,111 (2012) ▼	011,28 km^{2}	364,4/km^{2} ▼	93 %	7,9 ▼	11,3 ▼	1,375 ▲
Sajóbábony	2,782 (2012) ▼	013,43 km^{2}	207,1/km^{2} ▼	94 %	10,6 ▼	18,1 ▲	1,144
Arnót	2,544 (2012) ▼	017,54 km^{2}	145/km^{2} ▼	97 %	10,8 ▲	9,3 ▼	0810 ▲
Sajóvámos	2,200 (2012) ▼	031,22 km^{2}	070,4/km^{2} ▼	99 %	13,1 ▲	14,4 ▼	0782
Kistokaj	2,121 (2012) ▲	009,76 km^{2}	217,3/km^{2} ▲	98 %	10,9 ▲	12,4 ▼	0718 ▲
Sajókeresztúr	1,505 (2012) ▼	016,40 km^{2} ▲	091,7/km^{2} ▼	97 %	11,3 ▼	12,6 ▼	0571
Sajóecseg	1,007 (2012) ▼	007,94 km^{2}	126,8/km^{2} ▼	98 %	6,9 ▼	21,6 ▲	0434
Sajópálfala	727 (2012) ▼	007,11 km^{2}	102,5/km^{2} ▼	98 %	5,3 ▼	10,6 ▲	0283 ▼
Agglomeration	205,626 (2012) ▼	440,85 km^{2} ▲	466,4/km^{2} ▼	94 %	9,7 ▼	13,1 ▼	89,376 ▲
