= Putnok District =

Coordinates: 48.29411042350273°N 20.436039350496493°E

Putnok District Putnoki járás
- Districts of Hungary
- Coat of arms

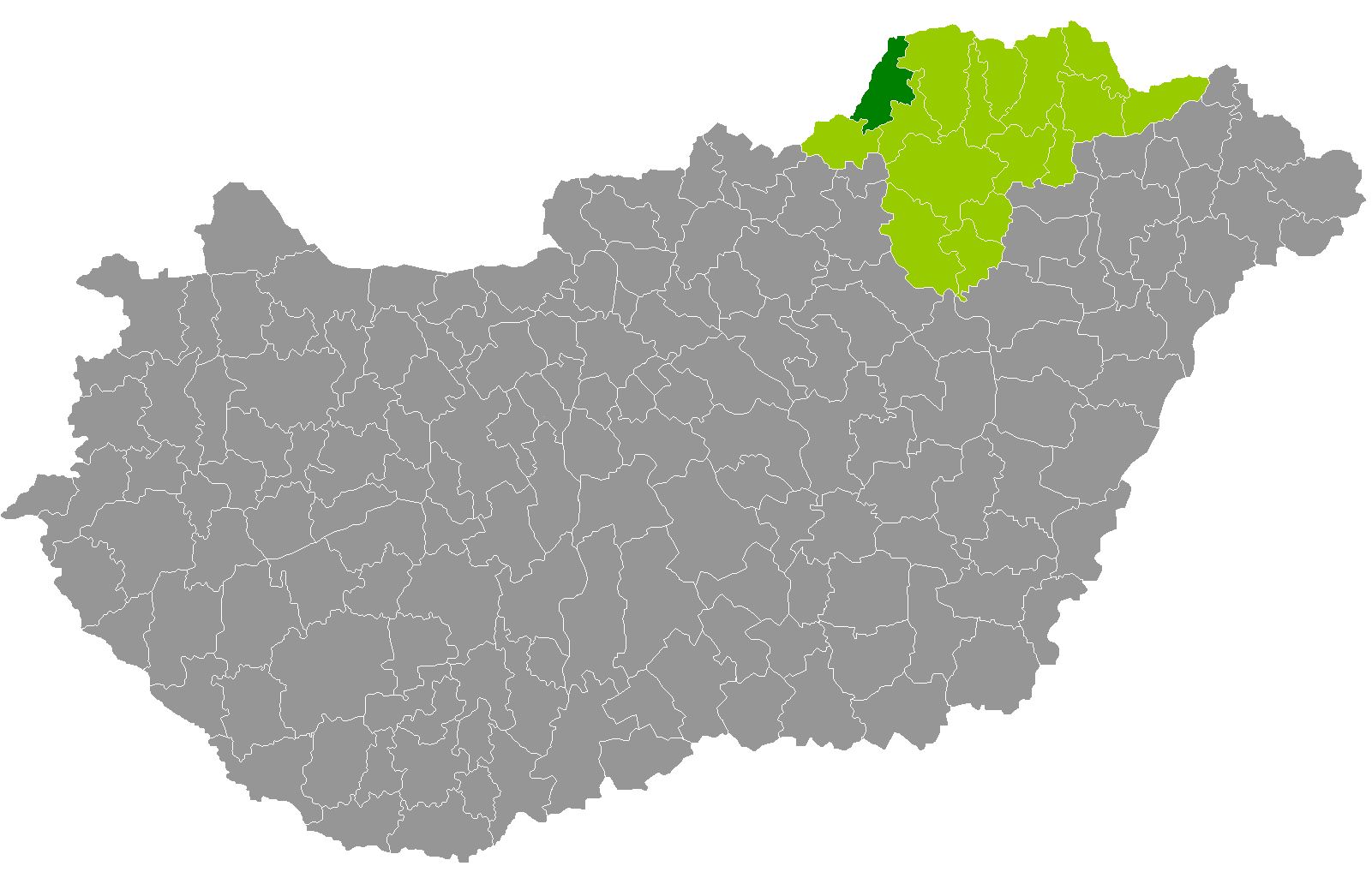
- Putnok District within Hungary and Borsod-Abaúj-Zemplén County.
- Country: Hungary
- County: Borsod-Abaúj-Zemplén
- District seat: Putnok

Area
  - Total: 391.25 km^{2} (151.06 sq mi)
  - Rank: 7th in Borsod-Abaúj-Zemplén

Population (2011 census)
  - Total: 19,290
  - Rank: 11th in Borsod-Abaúj-Zemplén
  - Density: 49/km^{2} (130/sq mi)

Putnok (Hungarian: Putnoki járás) is a district in north-western part of Borsod-Abaúj-Zemplén County. Putnok is also the town where the district seat is found. The district is located in the Northern Hungary statistical region.

== Geography ==
Putnok District borders with the Slovak regions of Banská Bystrica and Košice to the northwest, Edelény District and Kazincbarcika District to the east and Ózd District to the south. The number of municipalities in Putnok District is 26.

== Municipalities ==
The district has one town (bolded) and 25 villages. (ordered by population, as of 1 January 2012)

- Aggtelek (535)
- Alsószuha (479)
- Bánréve (1,271)
- Dövény (283)
- Dubicsány (285)
- Felsőkelecsény (364)
- Felsőnyárád (980)
- Gömörszőlős (77)
- Hét (493)
- Imola (96)
- Jákfalva (525)
- Jósvafő (235)
- Kánó (163)
- Kelemér (525)
- Királd (834)
- **Putnok** (6,634) – district seat
- Ragály (649)
- Sajómercse (221)
- Sajónémeti (493)
- Sajópüspöki (503)
- Sajóvelezd (826)
- Serényfalva (970)
- Szuhafő (141)
- Trizs (195)
- Zádorfalva (480)
- Zubogy (577)

== Demographics ==
Religion in Putnok District (2011 census)
1. Catholic Church (34.9%)
2. Greek Catholicism (1.50%)
3. Calvinism (27.6%)
4. Lutheranism (0.60%)
5. Other religions (1.80%)
6. Non-religious (11.1%)
7. Atheists (0.40%)
8. Undeclared (22.1%)

In 2011, it had a population of 19,290 and the population density was 49/km².

Year	County population	Change
2011	19,290	n/a

=== Ethnicity ===
Besides the Hungarian majority, the main minority is the Roma (approx. 1,500).

Total population (2011 census): 19,290
Ethnic groups (2011 census): Identified themselves: 18,547 persons:

- Hungarians: 16,821 (90.69%)
- Gypsies: 1,573 (8.48%)
- Others and indefinable: 153 (0.82%)

Approx. 1,000 persons in Putnok District did not declare their ethnic group at the 2011 census.

=== Religion ===
Religious adherence in the county according to 2011 census:

- Catholic – 7,027 (Roman Catholic – 6,735; Greek Catholic – 291);
- Reformed – 5,326;
- Evangelical – 107;
- other religions – 347;
- Non-religious – 2,148;
- Atheism – 79;
- Undeclared – 4,256.

== Gallery ==
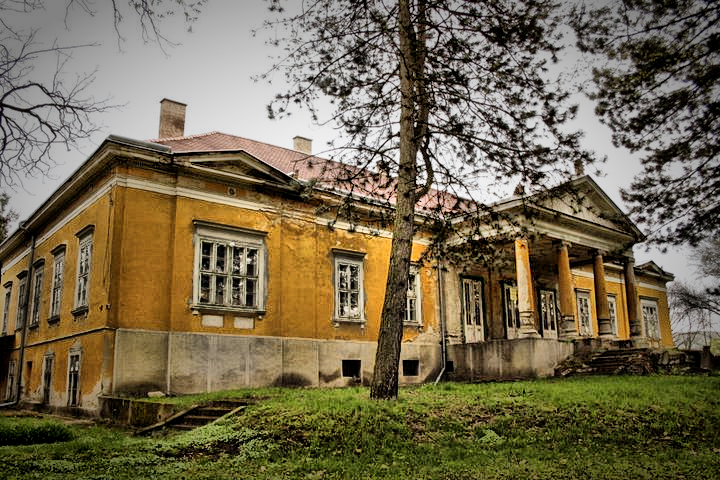
Serényi Mansion in Putnok

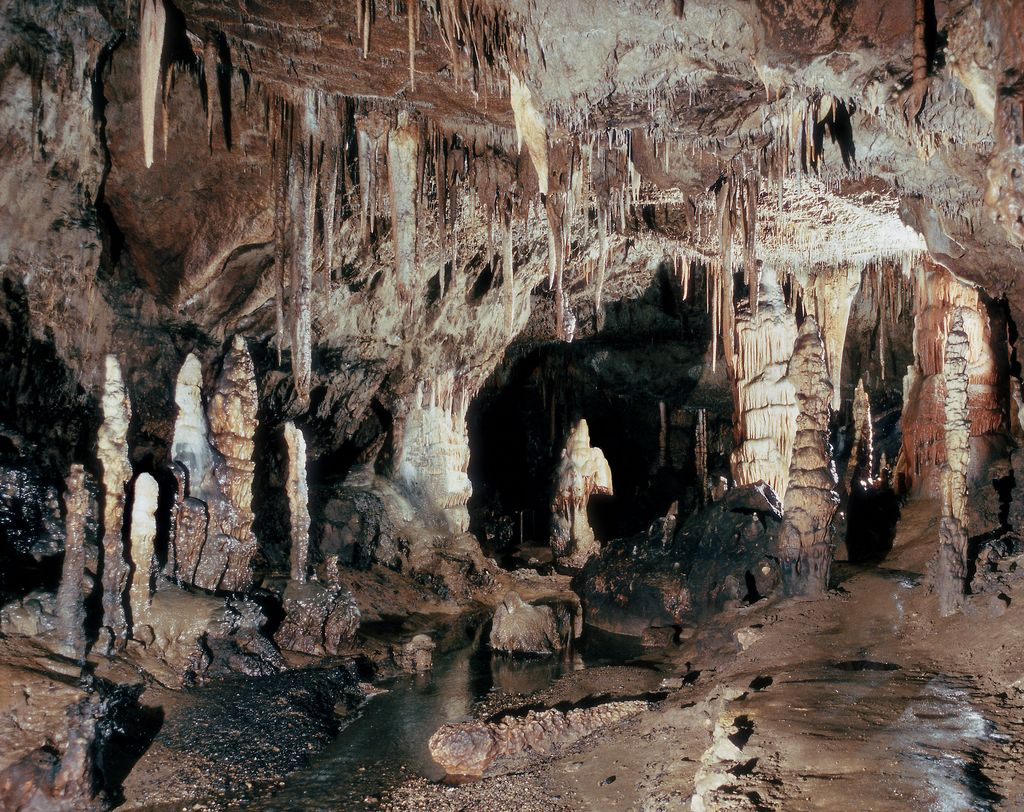
Baradla cave

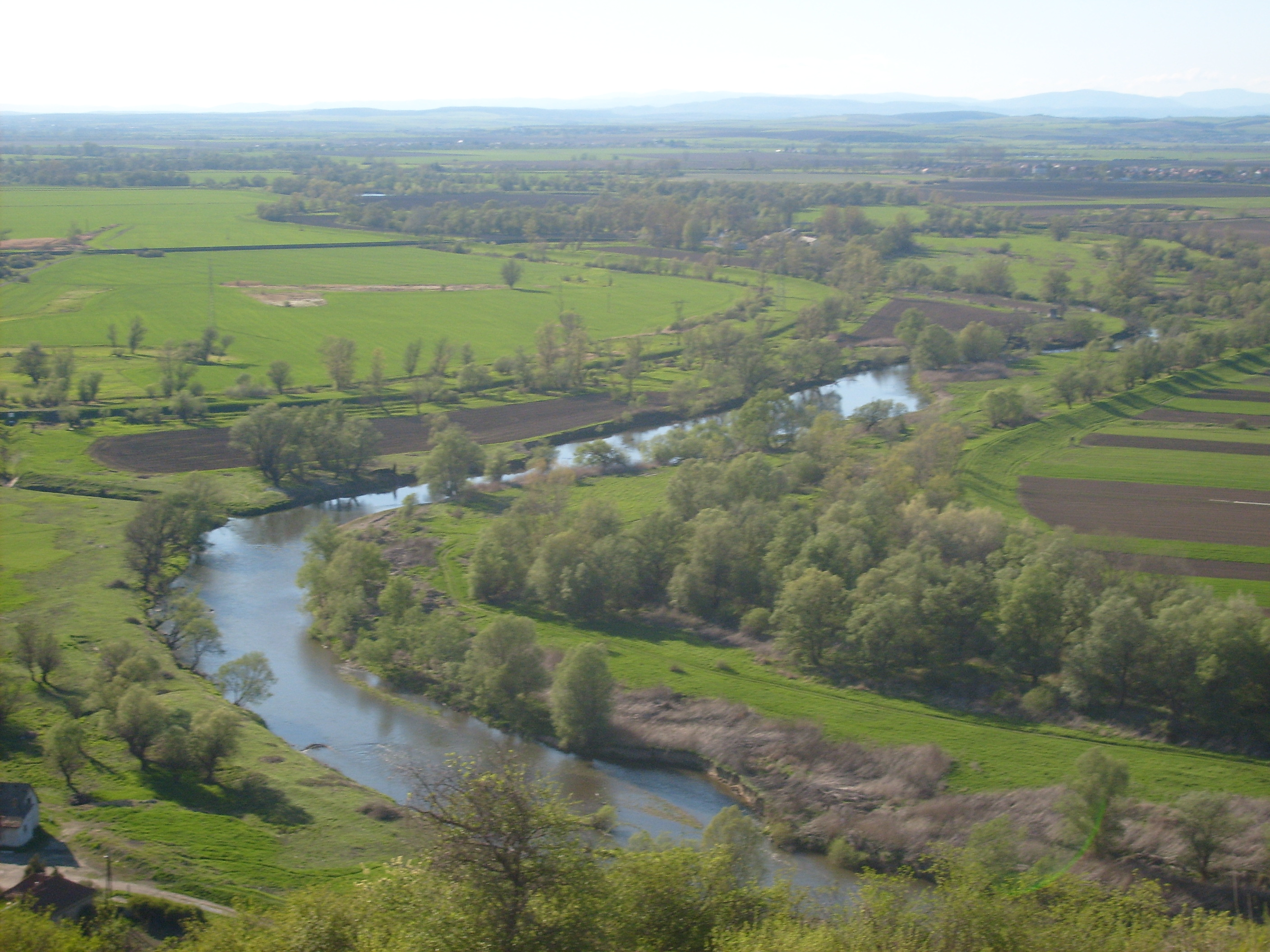
Sajó river from Sajónémeti

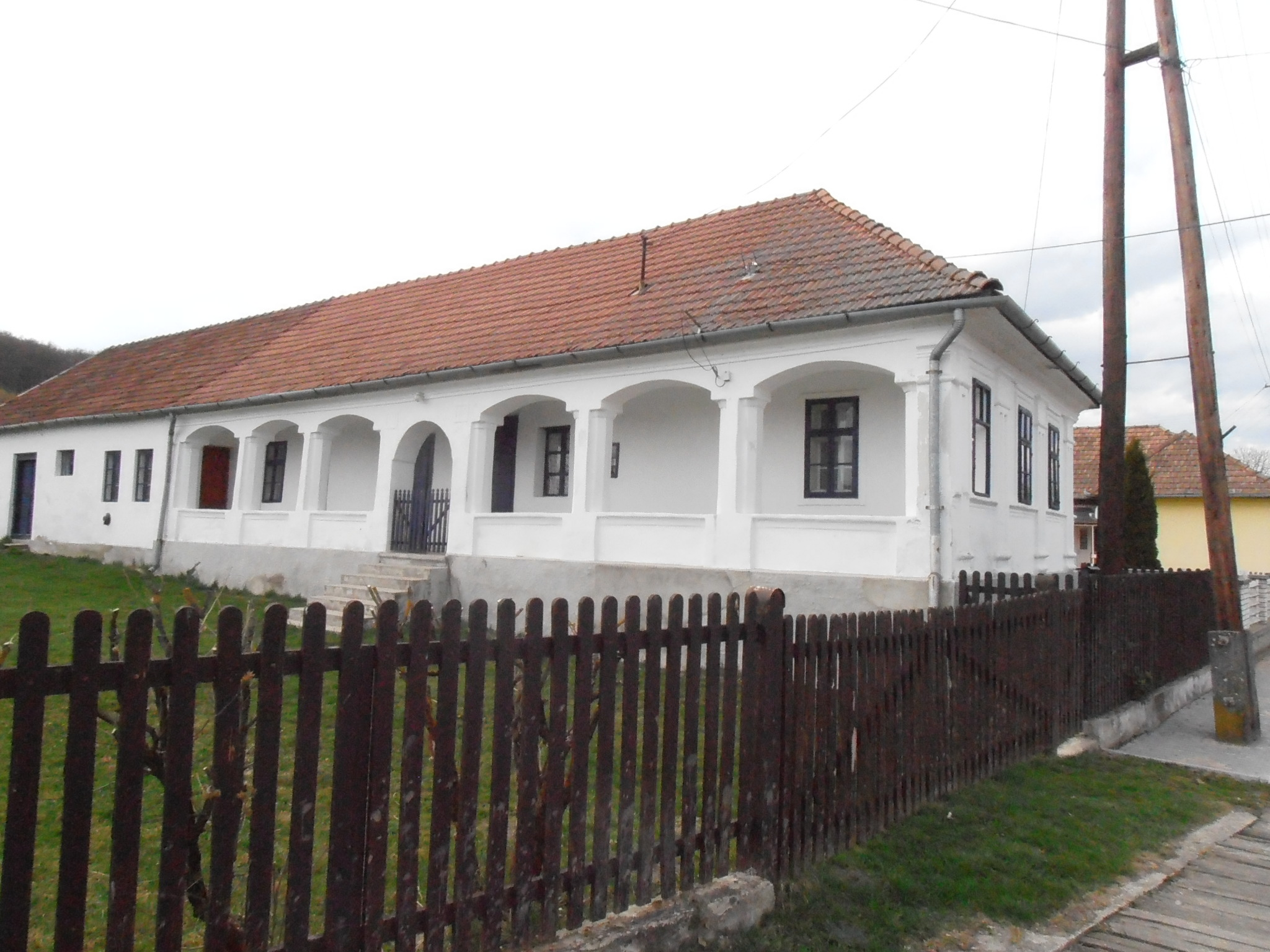
Traditional house from Gömörszőlős

== See also ==
- List of cities and towns of Hungary
