= Holy Spirit Church (Sajópálfala) =

Coordinates: 48.16164°N 20.84761°E

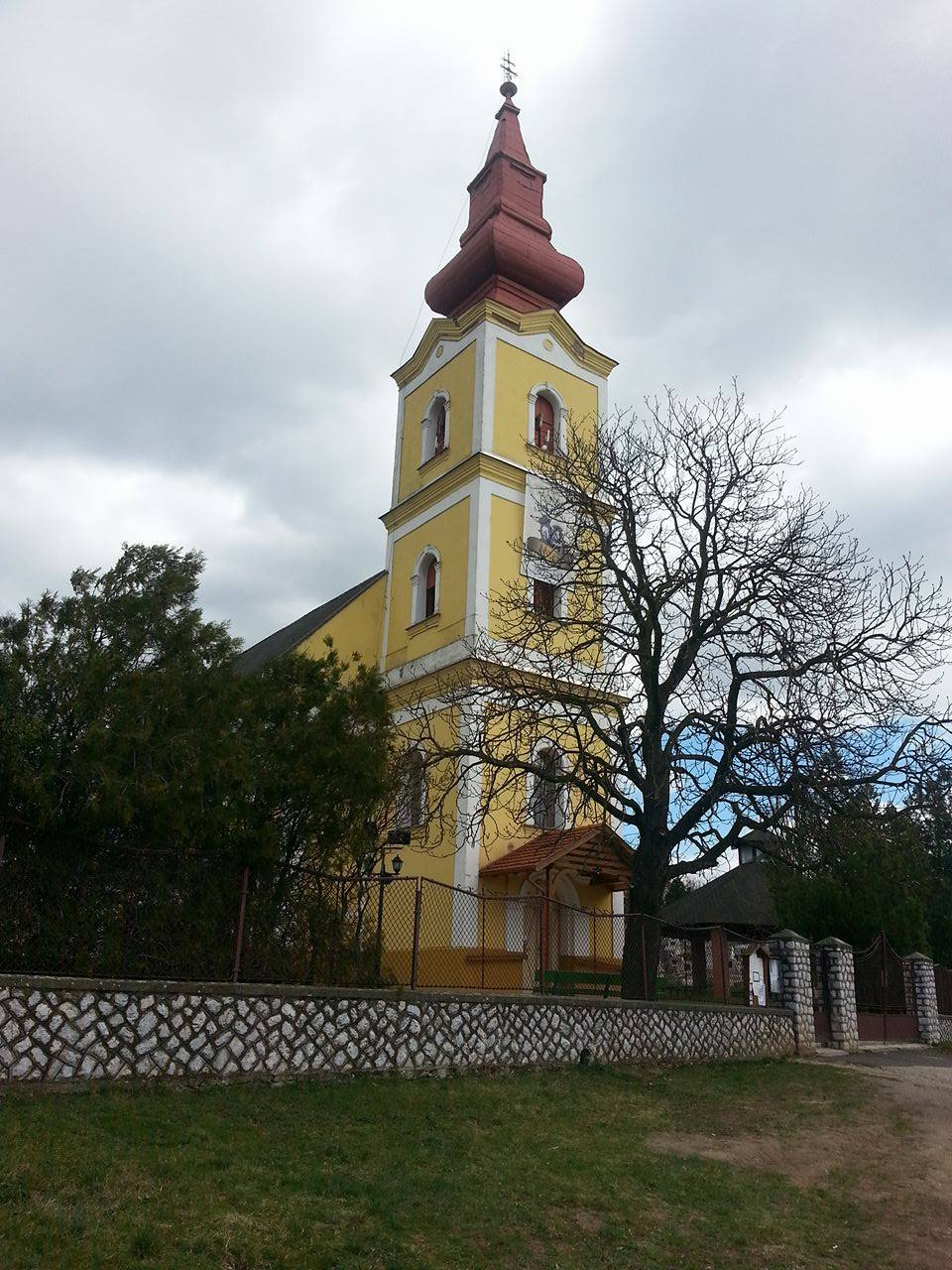

The Holy Spirit Church (Hungarian: Szentlélek-templom) is a Greek Catholic church located in Sajópálfala, Hungary.

After the Turkish occupation and the Rákóczi's War of Independence, in 1717, Rusyn people settled down in the area, and the first church was built.

In 1777, a mysterious event was recognised by local people. In the devotional picture, in which Virgin Mary and the Child are painted, bloody tears were rolling down on Mary's face on the surface of the painting. This supernatural event is one of the Marian apparitions. The painting was delivered to Eger, but in 1973, the original painting was transported back to Sajópálfala. Sajópálfala belongs to the destinations of The Way of Mary. It is a pilgrimage route, which connects Marian shrines. Other sights can be visited near Sajópálfala, for example, in Sajóvámos, Szirmabesenyő, Miskolc, Szikszó and Aszaló.

The previous wooden church was demolished, and in 1779 a church was constructed which can be still admired in the present. It is 26 metres high, more than 7 metres wide, and the walls are between 70 and 140 centimetres thick built of stone. At the end of the 19th century, the tower of the church was constructed which is approximately 30 metres high. In 1933, the very detailed stained glass of the church was created.

Today there are three bells inside the church. At the beginning of the 1800s, a bell was made which measures about 400 kilograms. 22 years later a bell of 200 kilograms was made and finally, in 1861, a bell of half the weight of the previous one was constructed. Although in the middle of the 20th century the bell of 200 kilograms had to be taken because of military purposes, it was later substituted with a new one.
