= Putnok =

- Town
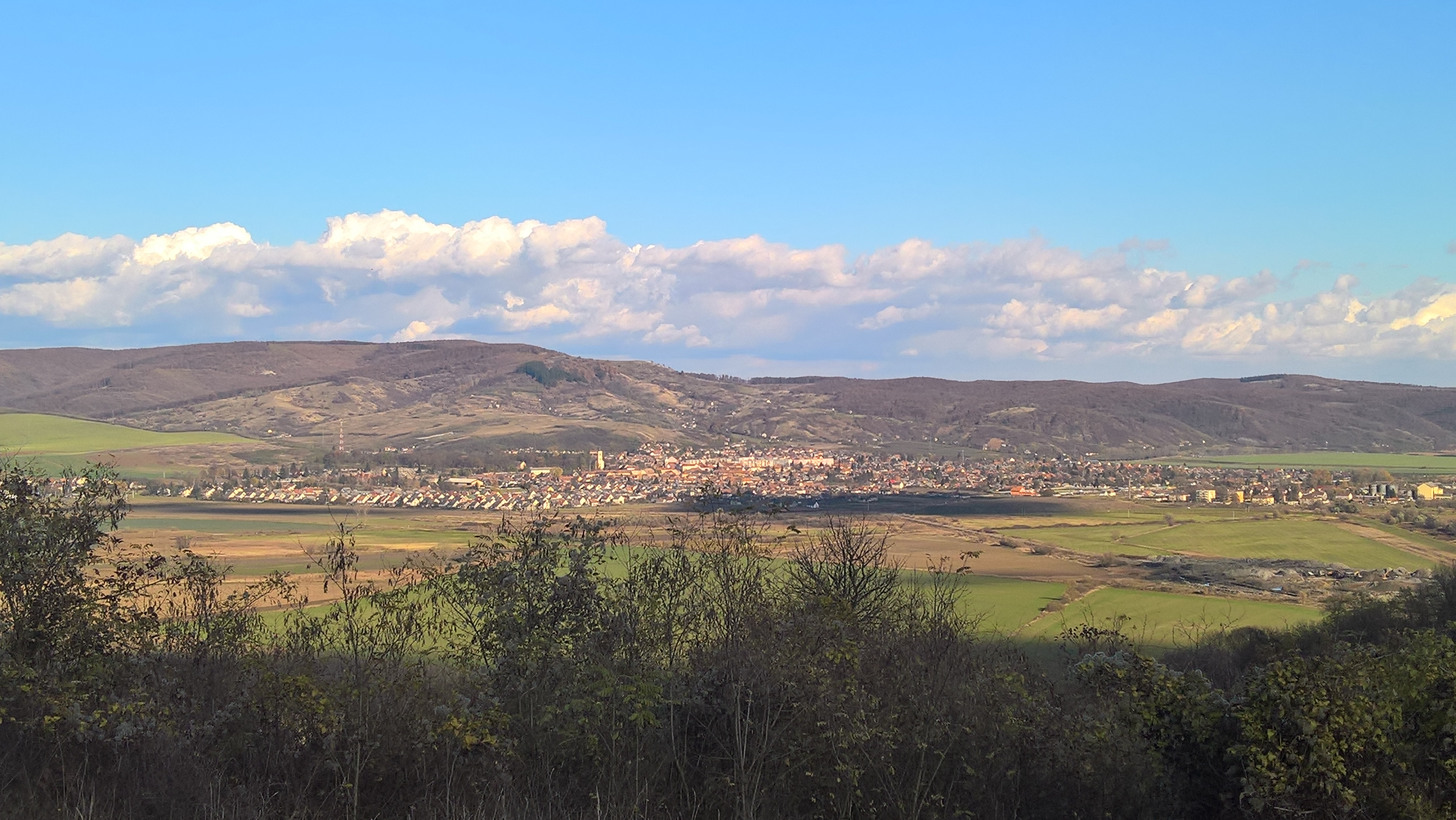
- General view of the town

- Flag Coat of arms

- Location within Hungary
- Coordinates: 48.29386°N 20.43680°E
- Country: Hungary
- County: Borsod-Abaúj-Zemplén
- District: Putnok

Area
  - Total: 34.73 km^{2} (13.41 sq mi)

Population (2008)
  - Total: 7,229
  - Density: 208.14/km^{2} (539.1/sq mi)
- Time zone: UTC+1 (CET)
  - Summer (DST): UTC+2 (CEST)
- Postal code: 3630
- Area code: (+36) 48
- Website: www.putnok.hu

Putnok (Slovak: Putnok/Putník) is a town in Borsod-Abaúj-Zemplén county, Northern Hungary. It lies 40 km (25 mi) from Miskolc, between the Bükk Mountains and the river Sajó.

== History ==
The area has been inhabited since Neolithic times. Until 1283 it was royal property, part (later centre) of the Gömör estate. In 1283 King László IV gave it to the Rátolth family (later: Putnoky family.) The family did much for the development of the town, but after the death of the dynasty founder Miklós a family feud began, and the inhabitants of the town and their other estates suffered a lot.

The Putnoky family had the castle of Putnok built between 1412 and 1427. During the Turkish occupation of Hungary the castle was destroyed, and in 1834 a manor house was built in its place. The town developed a lot in the 19th century, but it lost its town status in 1881.

After World War I, in 1920 the Treaty of Trianon was signed. 92% of Gömör-Kishont county was ceded to newly formed Czechoslovakia. Only its south-eastern ends, including Putnok, remained in Hungary. Being the largest village of what remained of the county, Putnok became its center. Soon enough, this small county was merged with neighbouring Borsod county, forming Borsod-Gömör-Kishont and after 1950 Borsod-Abaúj-Zemplén. Putnok lost its importance, in many senses its role was taken over by Ózd, still it got its town status back on March 1, 1989.

== Jewish community ==
Jews lived there at the beginning of the 20th century, but this community was only established as a religious community in 1852. At the same time, their chevra kadisha was also organized. There are gravestones with older dates in their cemetery. The first rabbi of the religious community was Braun Salamon, who served until his death in 1873. Their synagogue was built in 1866. Many buildings of the religious community were located on the large plot of the synagogue. Here was the rabbi's house, the poultry kosher slaughterhouse, the elementary school, the teacher's apartment and the Talmud-Torah building. The community's mikveh was in a separate building. Chevra kadisha, who practiced lively charity, had a foundation house on the main street. The previous leadership of the Youth Association also performed commendable work in the social and charitable field. The religious community organized its elementary school in 1875, where Hungarian was the language of instruction from the beginning. In addition to the teacher, the religious community has two religious teachers, Talmud-Torah melamed, clerk, etc. volt. After the death of their first rabbi, they elected the famous Rabbi Jacob Tannenbaum, born in Szendrő, who had previously been the rabbi of the religious community in Tállya from 1858 to 1869, and then from 1869 to 1873 in Mezőcsát. He established a yeshiva, very popular at the time, whose students (more than 150) were cared for by members of the religious community. After his death in 1879, his son Rabbi Márton Tannenbaum was elected. After the death of Rabbi Márton Tannenbaum, his son-in-law, Heiman Teitelbaum, the rabbi of Kaba, is elected. The highly popular rabbi was surrounded with love by his followers. During Hitler's times, the chief sergeant in Putnok was the extremely sarcastic Mogyorósi, who interned many Putnok Jews in the Garany internment camp using various pretexts. Naturally, he also interned the rabbi of the religious community. The rabbi's son-in-law, Rabbi Lipa Groszman (lived in Petach Tikva) also shared this fate. The rabbi was taken by the death train to Auschwitz - together with his followers, they gave their lives for their Jewishness.

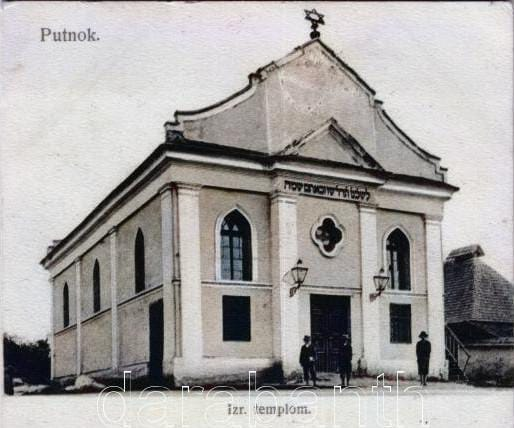
putnok Jewish synagogue

== Tourist sights ==
- Gömör Museum
- László Holló Gallery

== Twin towns – sister cities ==
Putnok is twinned with:

- Fécamp, France
- Ludgeřovice, Czech Republic
- Nowy Żmigród, Poland
- Tisovec, Slovakia
- Tornaľa, Slovakia
