= Reformed Prayer House, Arnót =

Church in Arnót, Hungary

Coordinates: 48°7′57.68″N 30°51′26.05″E

Reformed Prayer House of Arnót
- Arnóti református imaház (Hungarian)
- The prayer house is behind the Lutheran church

- Location within Hungary
- Location: Arnót
- Country: Hungary
- Website: arnot.tirek.hu

Architecture
- Functional status: Active

Administration
- District: Cistibiscan Church District
- Parish: Reformed Mission Congregation of Arnót

The Reformed Prayer House of Arnót (Hungarian: Arnóti református imaház) is a Protestant prayer house in the village of Arnót, Hungary.

== History ==
The population of Arnót was originally Lutheran, the village's first Lutheran congregation was established in 1565.

In 1930, only 2 families were Reformed, but this number had increased to 100 by 1990. At that time Reformed church services took place at the Lutheran church, where Dezső Baksy served as vicar (1962-1996). He was followed by László Csomós.

In 1998 Csomós surveyed the congregation about becoming independent from the Lutheran congregation. Every member supported the idea. The old school building behind the Lutheran church was purchased. On October 28, 2001, the new prayer house opened and the new vicar, Zoltán Szilágyi, started service. The first ceremonial service was held on December 15, 2002.

The village's Reformed kindergarten opened in September 2021, next to the prayer house.

== See also ==
- Reformed Church in Hungary
- Arnót
