= Felsőkelecsény =

- Village
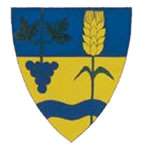
- Seal

- Location within Hungary
- Coordinates: 48°21′31.72″N 20°35′23.39″E
- Country: Hungary
- Regions: Northern Hungary
- County: Borsod-Abaúj-Zemplén County

Area
  - Total: 7.99 km^{2} (3.08 sq mi)

Population (2008)
  - Total: 420
- Time zone: UTC+1 (CET)
  - Summer (DST): UTC+2 (CEST)

Felsőkelecsény is a village in Borsod-Abaúj-Zemplén County in northeastern Hungary. As of 2022, it had a population of 354. The village is located in the valley of Csörgős with the neighbour villages Zubogy and Felsőnyárád. Felsőkelecsény also has a road connection with Rudabánya to the east.
