= Alsószuha =

- Village
- Flag Coat of arms

- Location of Alsószuha
- Coordinates: 48.37297°N 20.50470°E
- Country: Hungary
- Region: Northern Hungary
- County: Borsod-Abaúj-Zemplén
- District: Putnok

Area
  - Total: 22.42 km^{2} (8.66 sq mi)

Population (1 January 2025)
  - Total: 374
  - Density: 16.7/km^{2} (43.2/sq mi)
- Time zone: UTC+1 (CET)
  - Summer (DST): UTC+2 (CEST)
- Postal code: 3726
- Area code: (+36) 48

Alsószuha is a village in Borsod-Abaúj-Zemplén county, Hungary. It is around 5 km from the Slovak border, and around 50 km north-west of Miskolc.
