= Sajtoskál =

- Flag Coat of arms

- Location of Sajtoskál in Hungary
- Coordinates: 47°24′10″N 16°51′15″E
- Country: Hungary
- Region: Western Transdanubia
- County: Vas
- Subregion: Csepregi
- Rank: Village

Area
  - Total: 9.41 km^{2} (3.63 sq mi)

Population (1 January 2008)
  - Total: 411
  - Density: 43.7/km^{2} (113/sq mi)
- Time zone: UTC+1 (CET)
  - Summer (DST): UTC+2 (CEST)
- Postal code: 9632
- Area code: +36 94
- KSH code: 10579
- Website: www.sajtoskal.hu

Sajtoskál is a village in Vas county, Hungary.
