= Sümegprága =

- Sümegprága
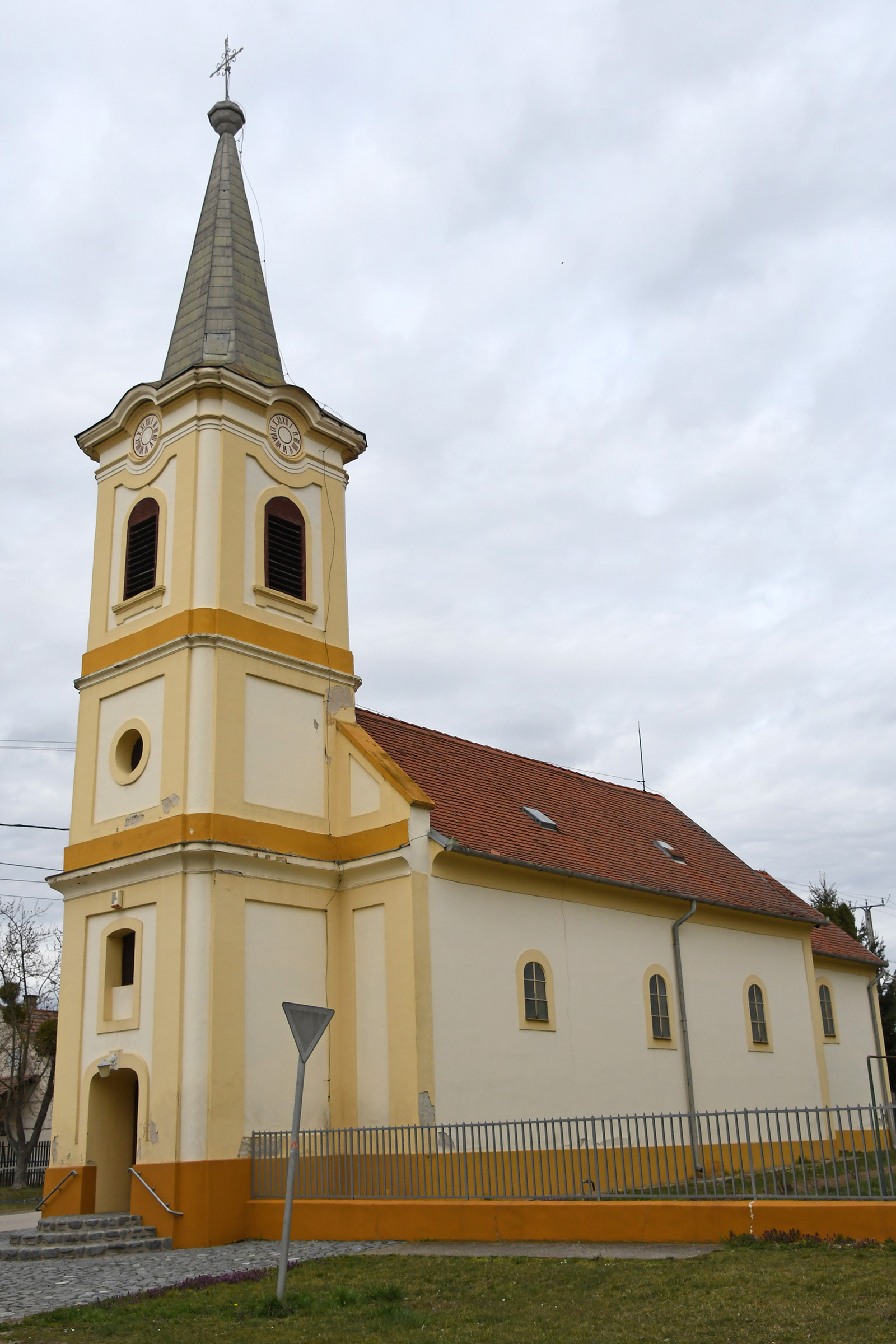
- Saint Stephen of Hungary church (Sümegprága)

- Coat of arms

- Location of Sümegprága
- Coordinates: 46.94129°N 17.27756°E
- Country: Hungary
- County: Veszprém

Area
  - Total: 5.79 km^{2} (2.24 sq mi)

Population (2004)
  - Total: 676
  - Density: 116.75/km^{2} (302.4/sq mi)
- Time zone: UTC+1 (CET)
  - Summer (DST): UTC+2 (CEST)
- Postal code: 8351
- Area code: 87

Sümegprága is a village in Veszprém county, Hungary.
