= Sóly =

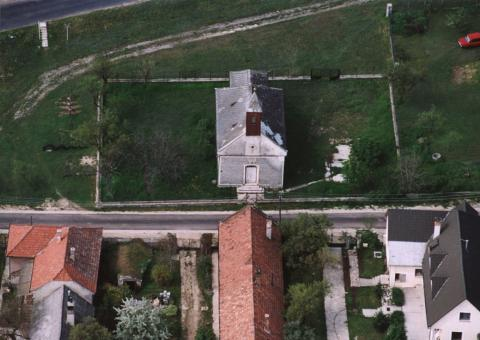
- Aerial photograph of Sóly

- Flag Coat of arms

- Location of Sóly
- Coordinates: 47.12944°N 18.03219°E
- Country: Hungary
- County: Veszprém

Area
  - Total: 10.28 km^{2} (3.97 sq mi)

Population (2004)
  - Total: 415
  - Density: 40.36/km^{2} (104.5/sq mi)
- Time zone: UTC+1 (CET)
  - Summer (DST): UTC+2 (CEST)
- Postal code: 8193
- Area code: 88

Sóly is a village in Veszprém county, Hungary.

== Sights ==
- Reformed church: King Stephen I of Hungary built a chapel in Sóly. The final battle against Koppány happened in the vicinity of the village. There is a royal charter about this chapel from 1009, connecting the Sóly church to the first Christian Hungarian King Stephen.
- The battle of Mohacs in 1526, south of Sóly, was between the Kingdom of Hungary and the Ottoman Empire, led by Sultan Solyman Haimullah, who quit Hungary without retaining possession of any villages.
- Royal Sword: A statue erected in 1998 remembering the final battle between Koppány and István and the Árpád dynasty. This is the largest sword in the world that is made of wood.
