= Sajóvelezd =

- Village
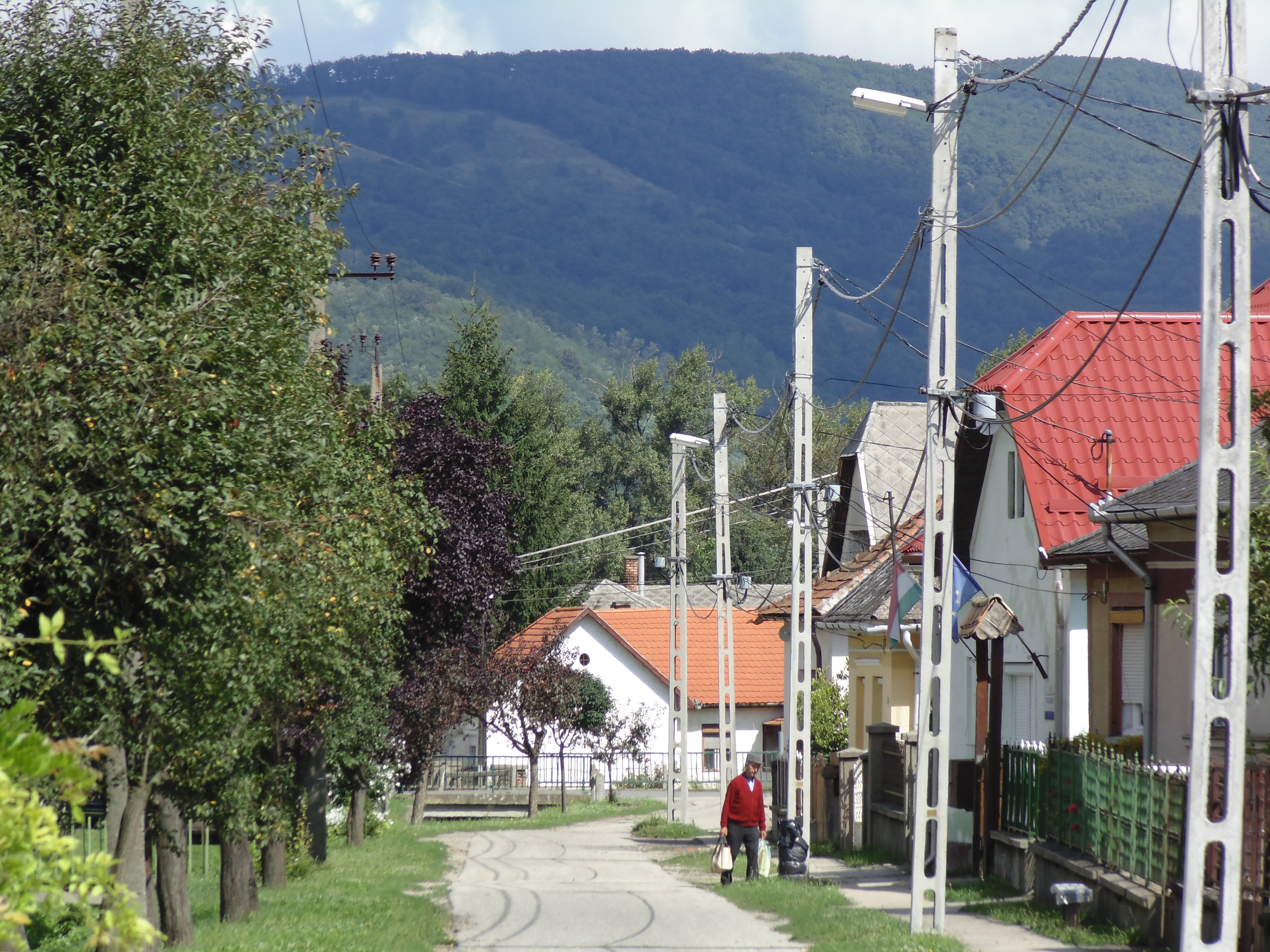

- Flag Coat of arms

- Location of Sajóvelezd
- Coordinates: 48.27189°N 20.46232°E
- Country: Hungary
- Region: Northern Hungary
- County: Borsod-Abaúj-Zemplén
- District: Putnok

Area
  - Total: 23.02 km^{2} (8.89 sq mi)

Population (1 January 2025)
  - Total: 671
  - Density: 29.1/km^{2} (75.5/sq mi)
- Time zone: UTC+1 (CET)
  - Summer (DST): UTC+2 (CEST)
- Postal code: 3656
- Area code: (+36) 48
- Website: sajovelezd.hu

Sajóvelezd is a village in Borsod-Abaúj-Zemplén County in northeastern Hungary.
