= Sótony =

- Location of Sótony in Hungary
- Coordinates: 47.19675°N 16.94890°E
- Country: Hungary
- Region: Western Transdanubia
- County: Vas
- Subregion: Sárvári
- Rank: Village

Area
  - Total: 14.93 km^{2} (5.76 sq mi)

Population (1 January 2008)
  - Total: 652
  - Density: 43.7/km^{2} (113/sq mi)
- Time zone: UTC+1 (CET)
  - Summer (DST): UTC+2 (CEST)
- Postal code: 9681
- Area code: +36 95
- KSH code: 22983
- Website: http://www.sotony.hu

Sótony is a village in Vas county, Hungary.
