= Sorkikápolna =

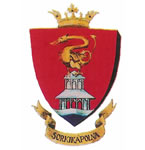
- Coat of arms

- Location of Sorkikápolna in Hungary
- Coordinates: 47°08′23″N 16°42′16″E
- Country: Hungary
- Region: Western Transdanubia
- County: Vas
- Subregion: Szombathelyi
- Rank: Village

Area
  - Total: 8.86 km^{2} (3.42 sq mi)

Population (1 January 2008)
  - Total: 273
  - Density: 30.8/km^{2} (79.8/sq mi)
- Time zone: UTC+1 (CET)
  - Summer (DST): UTC+2 (CEST)
- Postal code: 9774
- Area code: +36 94
- KSH code: 27960
- Website: www.sorkikapolna.hu

Sorkikápolna is a village in Vas county, Hungary.
