= Arnót =

- Village
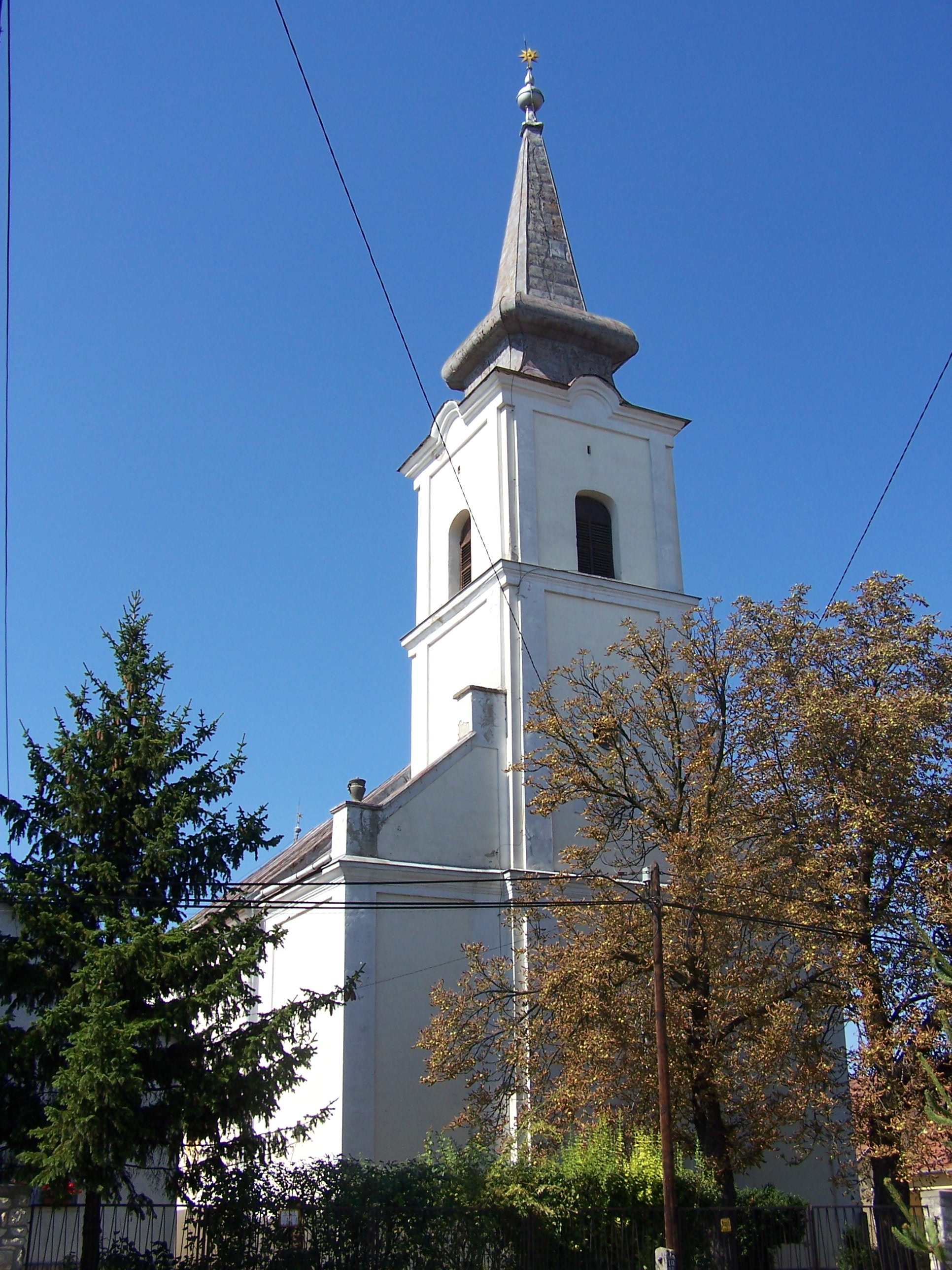

- Flag Coat of arms

- Location of Arnót
- Coordinates: 48.13197°N 20.85991°E
- Country: Hungary
- Region: Northern Hungary
- County: Borsod-Abaúj-Zemplén
- District: Miskolc

Area
  - Total: 17.54 km^{2} (6.77 sq mi)

Population (1 January 2025)
  - Total: 2,254
  - Density: 128.5/km^{2} (332.8/sq mi)
- Time zone: UTC+1 (CET)
  - Summer (DST): UTC+2 (CEST)
- Postal code: 3713
- Area code: (+36) 46
- Website: www.arnot.hu

Arnót is a village in Borsod-Abaúj-Zemplén county, Hungary.

The Reformed Church is located here.
