= Zubogy =

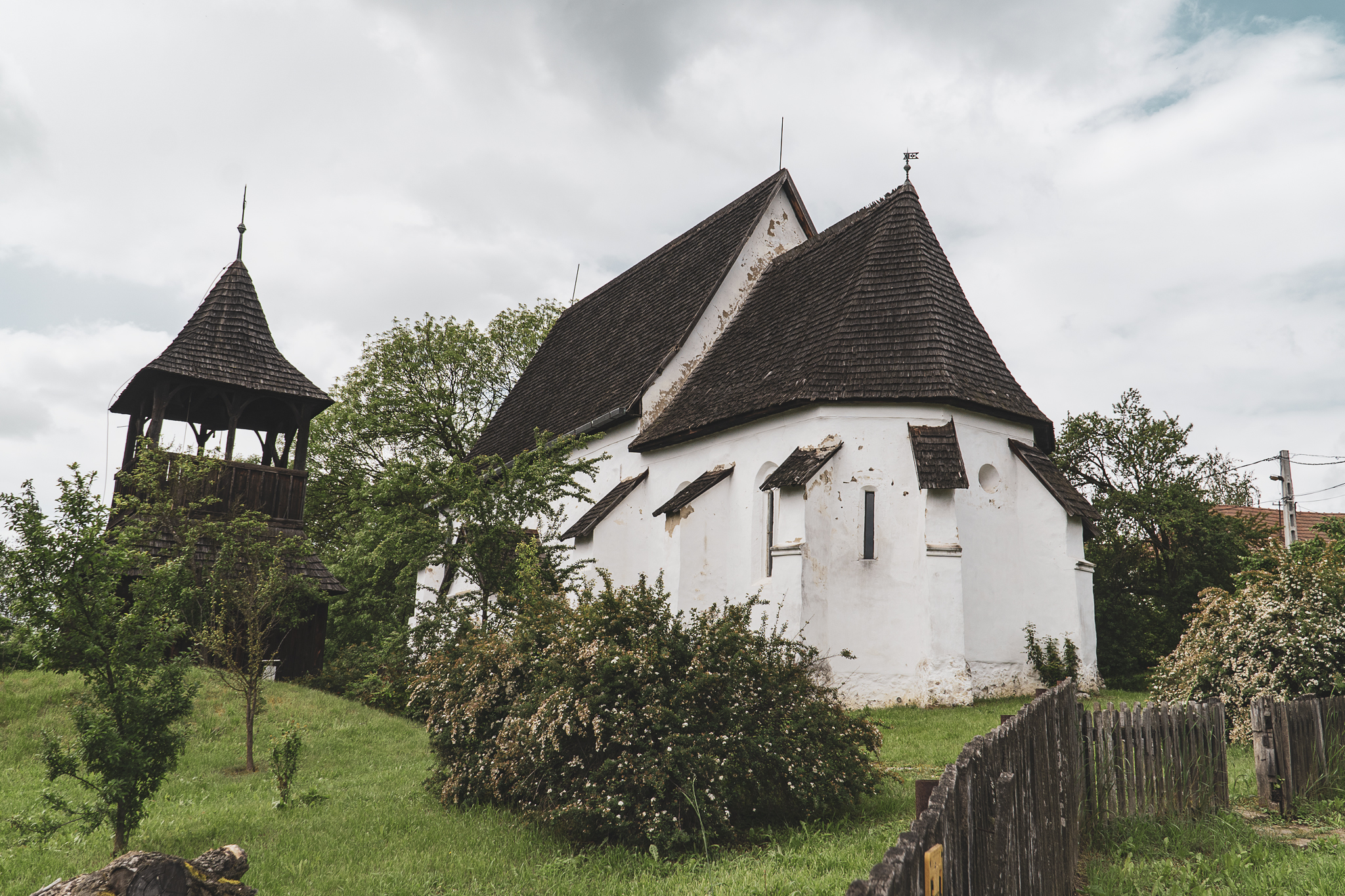

- Location of Borsod-Abaúj-Zemplén county in Hungary

- Location of Zubogy
- Coordinates: 48.37838°N 20.57510°E
- Country: Hungary
- County: Borsod-Abaúj-Zemplén

Area
  - Total: 11.43 km^{2} (4.41 sq mi)

Population (2004)
  - Total: 596
  - Density: 52.14/km^{2} (135.0/sq mi)
- Time zone: UTC+1 (CET)
  - Summer (DST): UTC+2 (CEST)
- Postal code: 3723
- Area code: 48

Zubogy is a village in Borsod-Abaúj-Zemplén county, Hungary. It has road connection with Ragály and Felsőkelecsény. The nearest town is Kazincbarcika (20 km). The name of the village is of Slovak origin.

== Church ==
There is Romanesque-Gothic church of the Reformed Church from the 12. century.

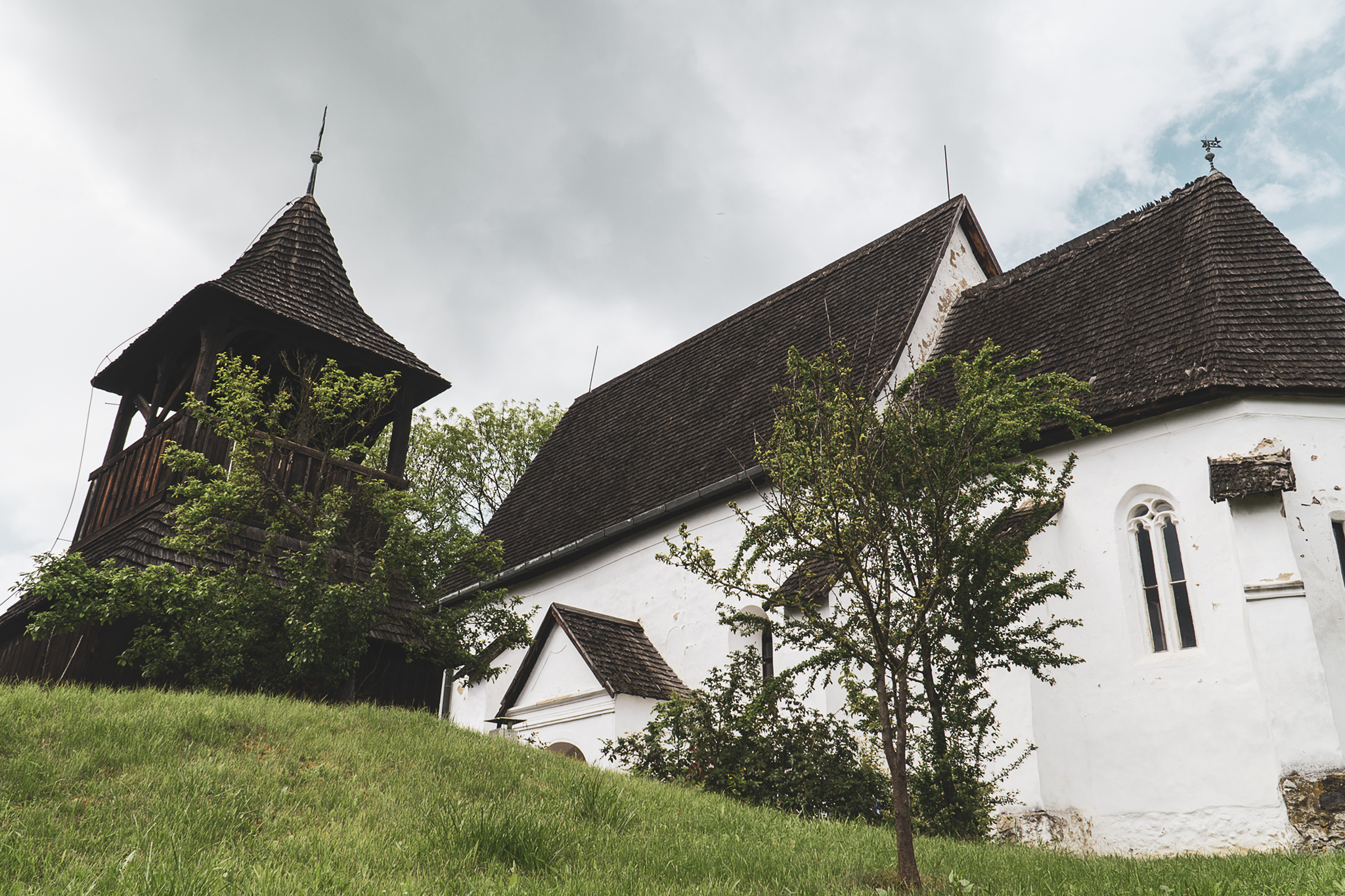

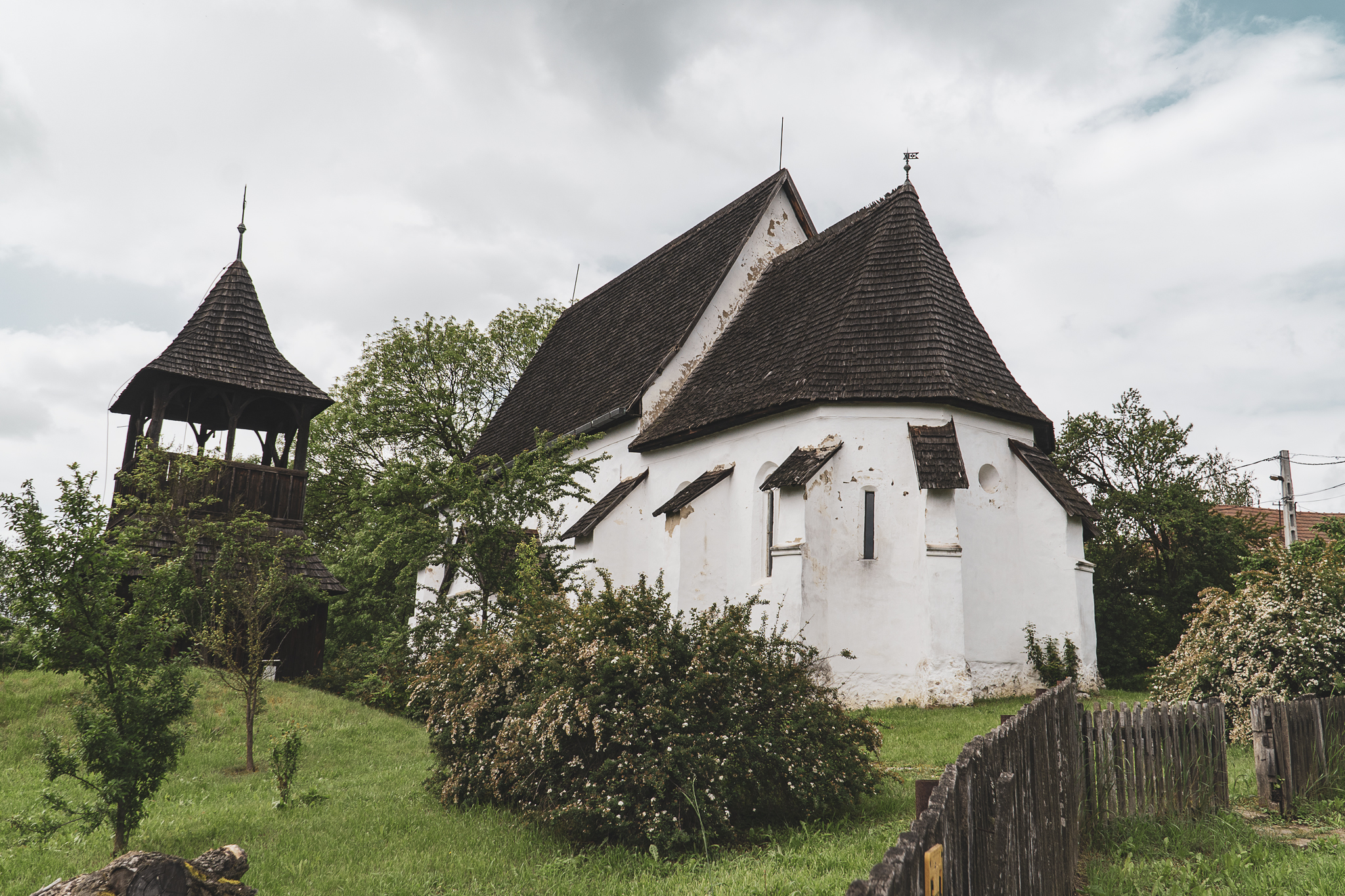

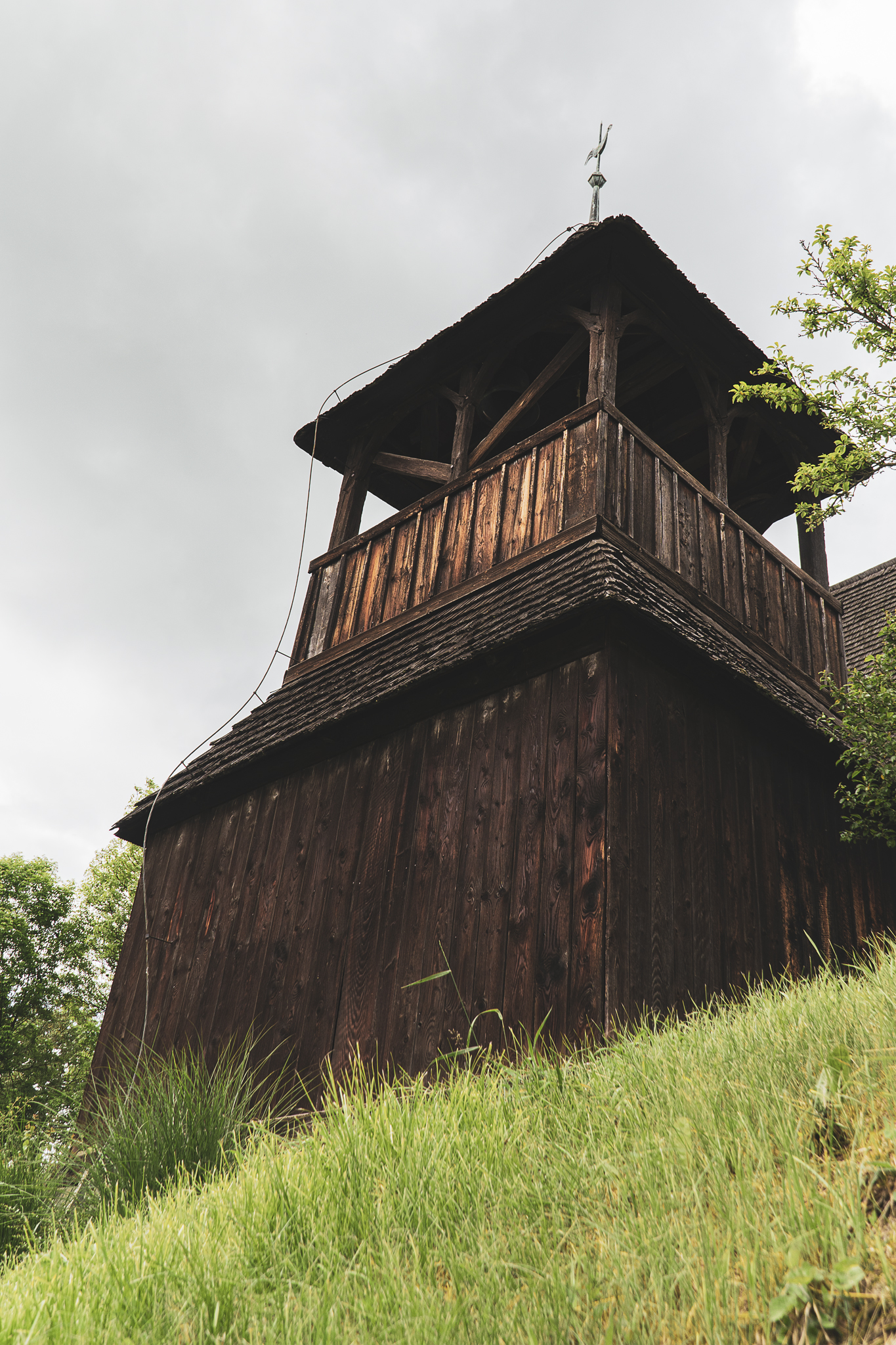

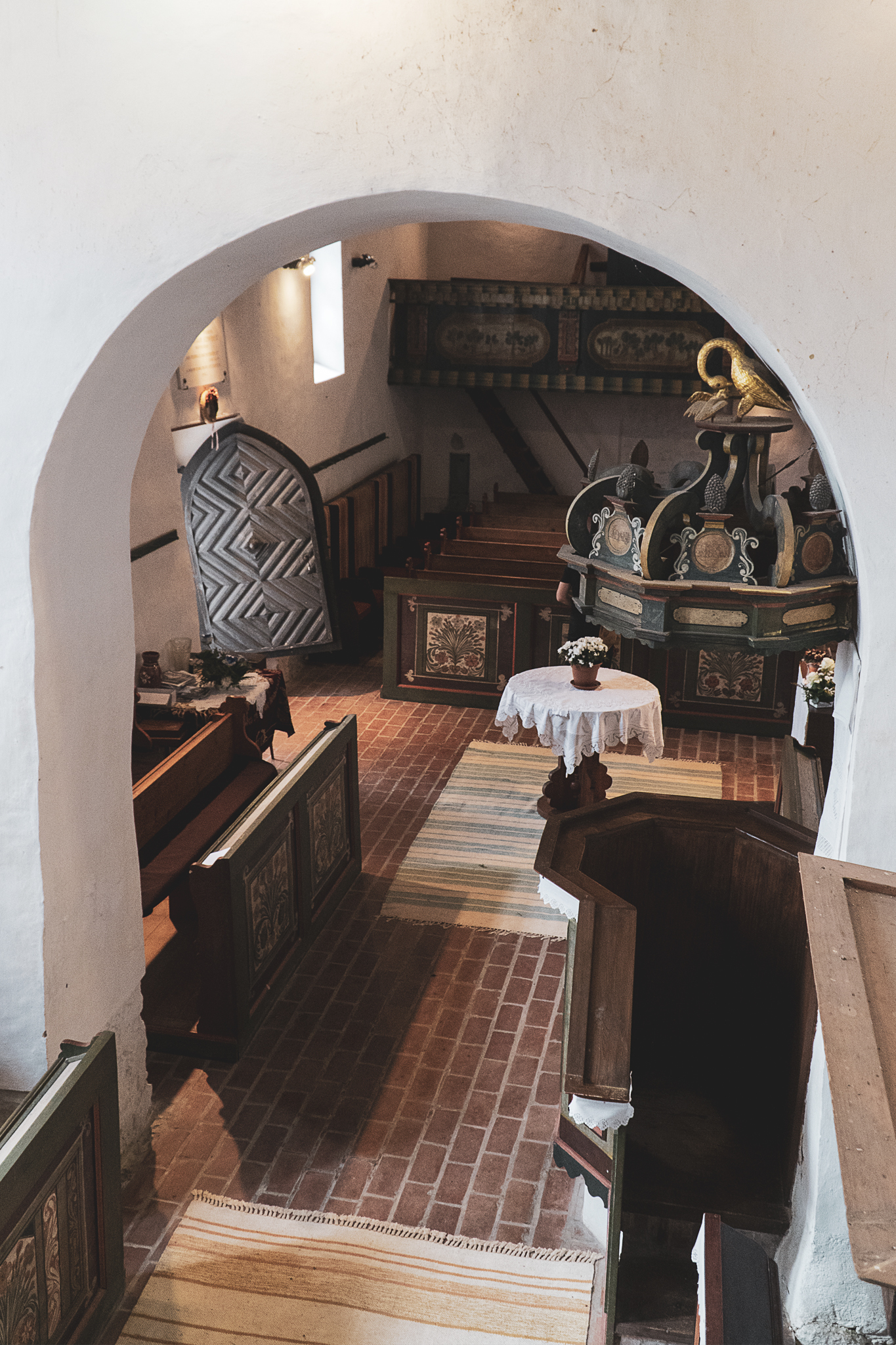

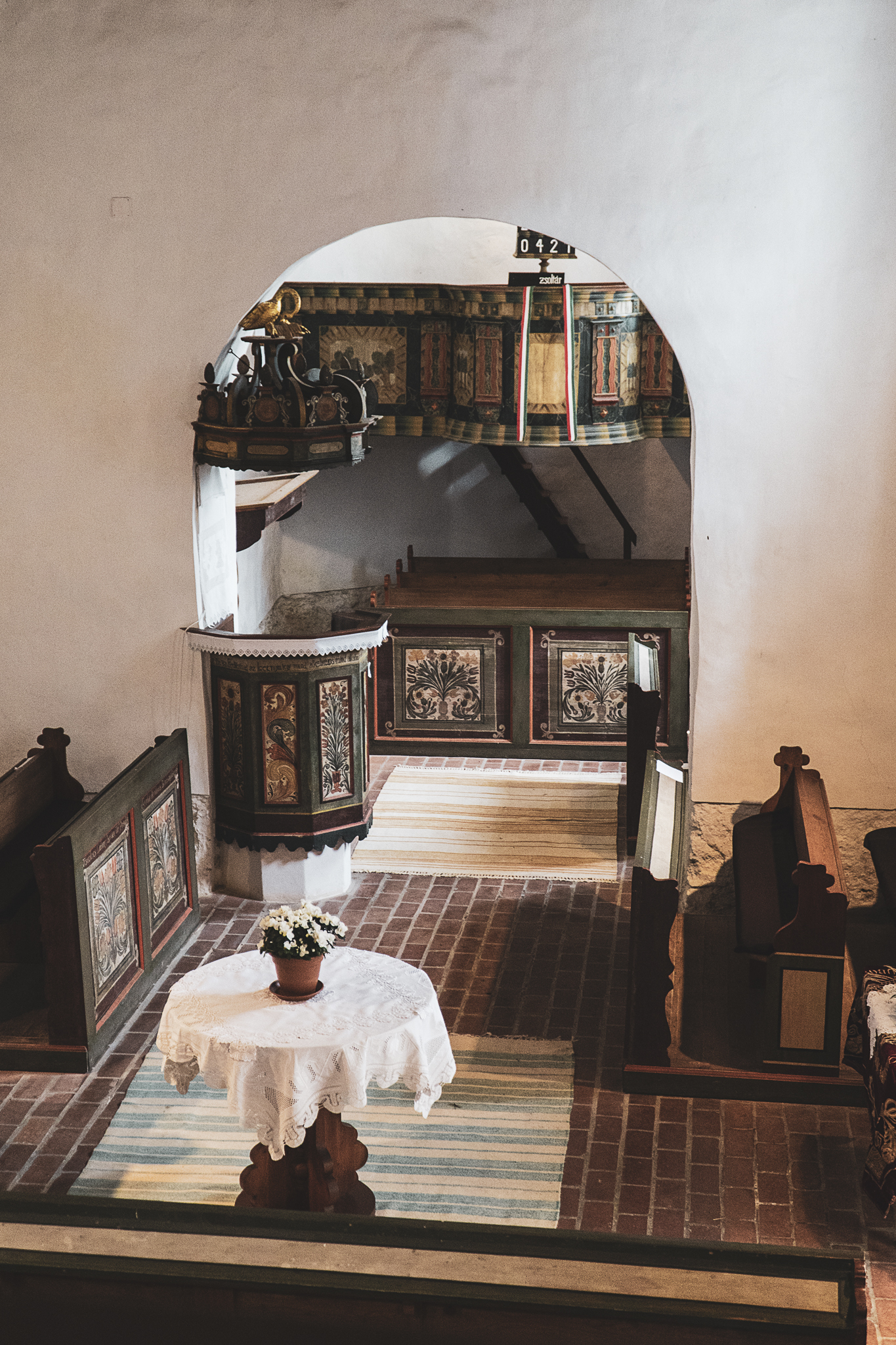

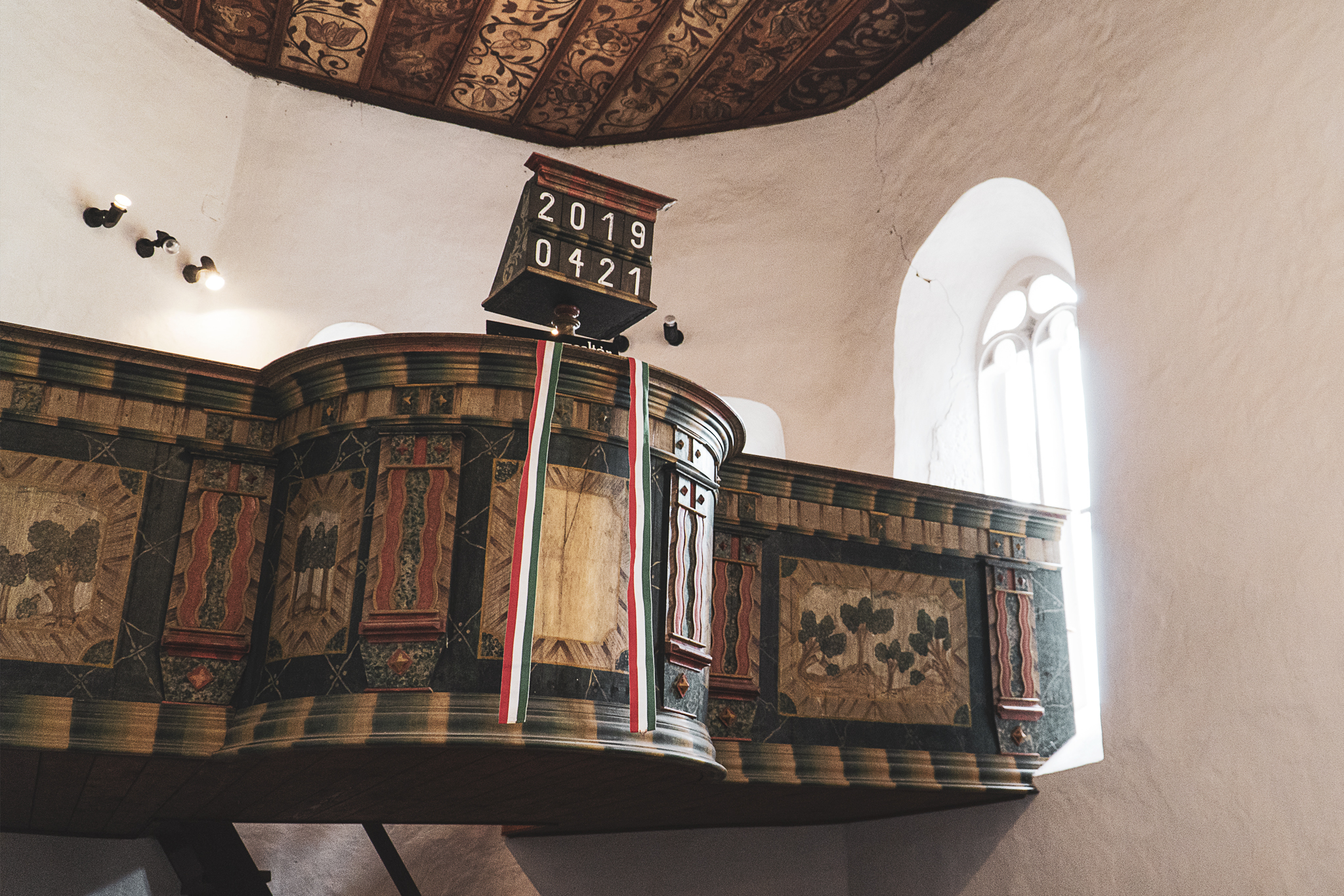

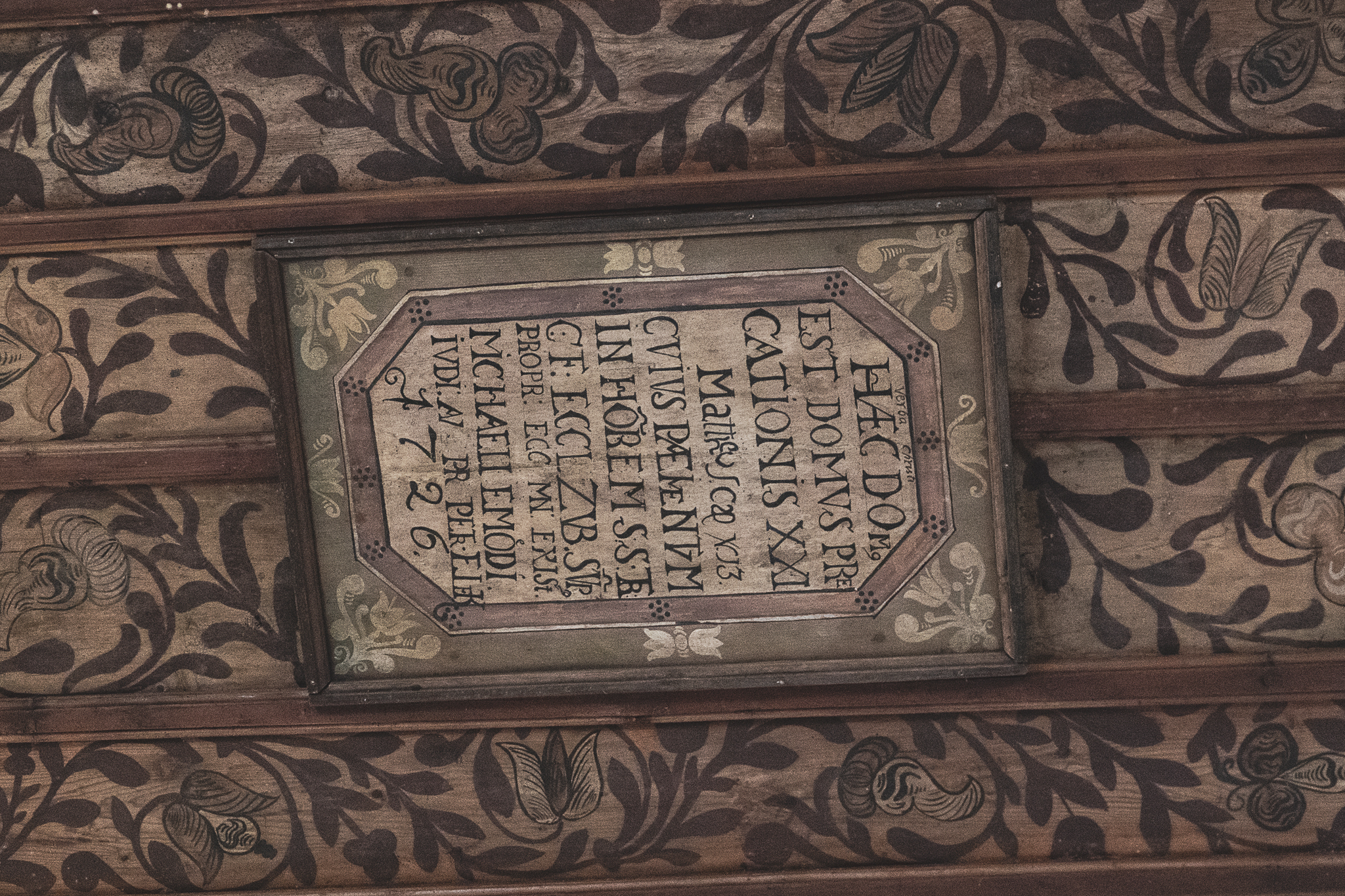
