= Gömörszőlős =

- Coat of arms

- Location of Gömörszőlős in Hungary
- Coordinates: 48.373°N 20.4276°E
- Country: Hungary
- Region: Northern Hungary
- County: Borsod-Abaúj-Zemplén

Area
  - Total: 8.77 km^{2} (3.39 sq mi)

Population (2012)
  - Total: 77
  - Density: 8.8/km^{2} (23/sq mi)
- Time zone: UTC+1 (CET)
  - Summer (DST): UTC+2 (CEST)
- Postal code: 3728
- Area code: +36 48
- Website: http://gomorszolos.hu/

Gömörszőlős is a village in Borsod-Abaúj-Zemplén county, Hungary.
