= Felsőnyárád =

- Village
- Flag Coat of arms

- Location of Felsőnyárád
- Coordinates: 48.328619°N 20.598569°E
- Country: Hungary
- Region: Northern Hungary
- County: Borsod-Abaúj-Zemplén
- District: Putnok

Area
  - Total: 11.67 km^{2} (4.51 sq mi)

Population (1 January 2025)
  - Total: 869
  - Density: 74.5/km^{2} (193/sq mi)
- Time zone: UTC+1 (CET)
  - Summer (DST): UTC+2 (CEST)
- Postal code: 3721
- Area code: (+36) 48
- Website: www.felsonyarad.hu

Felsőnyárád is a village in Borsod-Abaúj-Zemplén County in northeastern Hungary. As of 2008, the village had a population of 1058.
