= Sajókeresztúr =

- Village
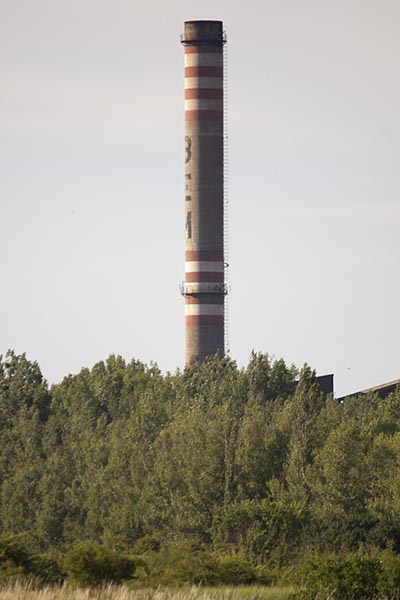

- Flag Coat of arms

- Location of Sajókeresztúr in Hungary
- Coordinates: 48.1696°N 20.7761°E
- Country: Hungary
- Region: Northern Hungary
- County: Borsod-Abaúj-Zemplén

Government
  - Mayor: Miklós Kollár

Area
  - Total: 16.4 km^{2} (6.3 sq mi)

Population (1 January 2012)
  - Total: 1,505
  - Density: 91.8/km^{2} (238/sq mi)
- Time zone: UTC+1 (CET)
  - Summer (DST): UTC+2 (CEST)
- Postal code: 3791
- Area code: +36
- Website: http://sajokeresztur.hu/

Sajókeresztúr is a village in Borsod-Abaúj-Zemplén County in northeastern Hungary, about seven kilometres north of Miskolc, between Szirmabesenyő and Sajóecseg. It has a kindergarten, a primary school (Eötvös József Általános Iskola) and a football team (Sajókeresztúri Fociklub).

== History ==
Sajókeresztúr is a settlement inhabited since prehistoric times. It is one of the settlements along the Sajó river, close to the Bükk mountains, which was put on the path of market town development by viticulture, wine production, and trade.

The first reference to its existence is from the 14th-15th centuries, in the registry book of the Miskolc kin (family) estates, referred to as ’Keresztwr’. The name was taken from its church, which was mentioned as ‘ecclesia Sancte Crucis’ in papal registry documents.

Sajókeresztúr was the property of one of the most considerable land-owner families of the time, the Bebek family. It obtained the rank of market town in the 17th century. Is inhabitants went through torturous times under the Turks, but still remained there. In recent history of the settlement the Borsod Metal Works - which were built up in the limits of the settlement, but are no longer in production — played a significant role.

== Demographics ==
97% of the population is Hungarian, 3% declared as Romani.

== Main sights ==
- Roman Catholic church
- Reformed church
