= Sajóvámos =

Coordinates: 48°11′N 20°51′E

- Village
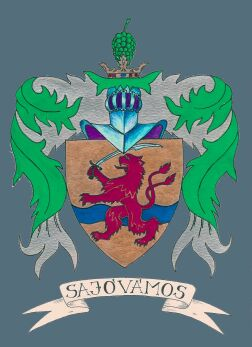
- Coat of arms
- Interactive map of Sajóvámos
- Country: Hungary
- Regions: Northern Hungary
- County: Borsod-Abaúj-Zemplén County

Area
  - Total: 31.22 km^{2} (12.05 sq mi)

Population (2013)
  - Total: 2,176
  - Density: 69.70/km^{2} (180.5/sq mi)
- Time zone: UTC+1 (CET)
  - Summer (DST): UTC+2 (CEST)
- Website: sajovamos.hu

Sajóvámos is a village in Borsod-Abaúj-Zemplén County in northeastern Hungary.

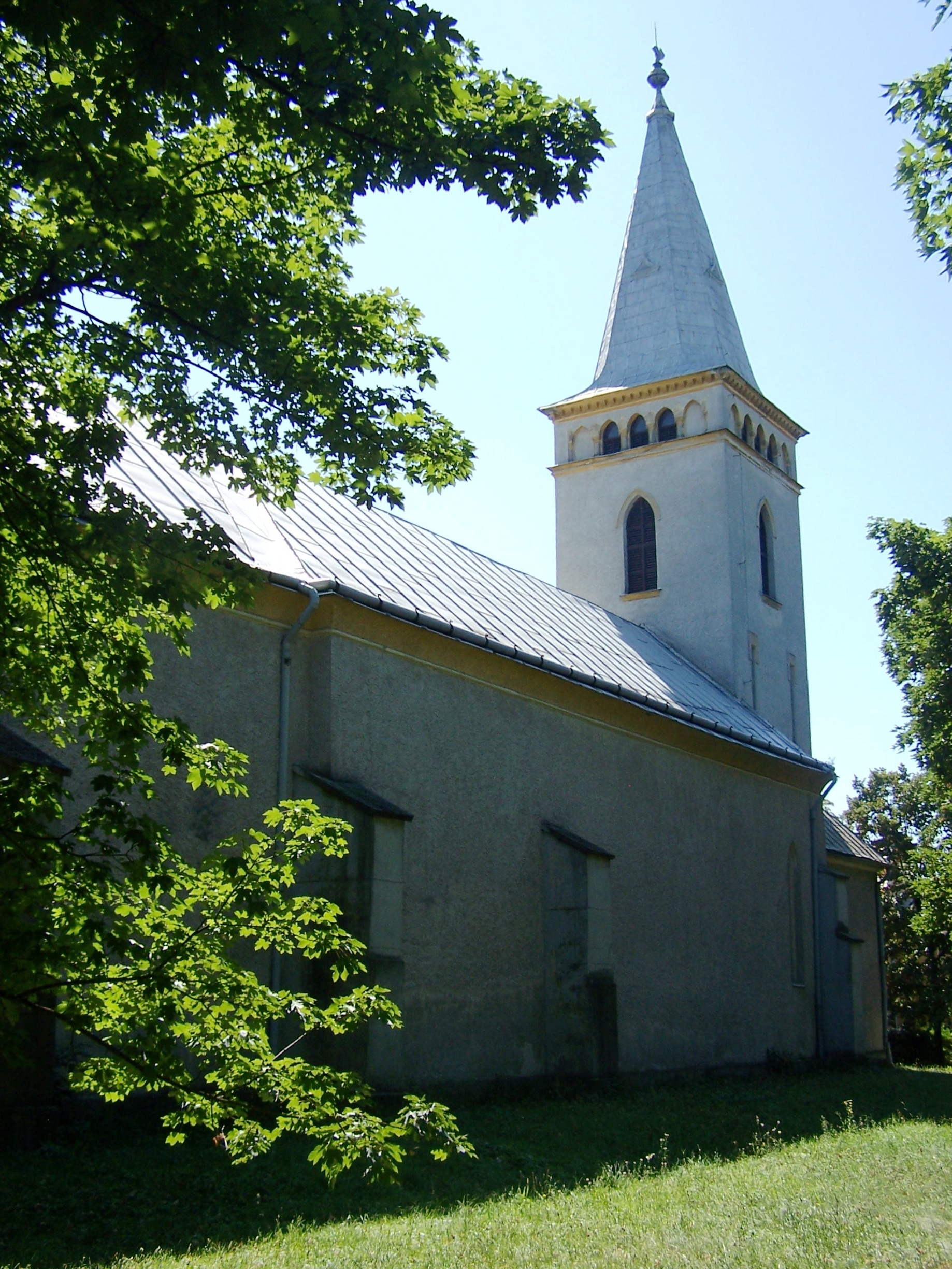
Calvinism church in Sajóvámos

== Ethnic groups ==
In 2011 Census

Group	Population (2011)	Proportion
Hungarians	2033	93 %
Gypsies	18	1 %
Germans	15	1 %
Others or no answer	119	5 %
Sajóvámos	2185	100 %

Historical population
Year	Pop.	±%
1996	2,226	—
1997	2,241	+0.7%
1998	2,225	−0.7%
1999	2,195	−1.3%
2000	2,198	+0.1%
2001	2,246	+2.2%
2002	2,243	−0.1%
2003	2,250	+0.3%
2004	2,303	+2.4%
2005	2,294	−0.4%
2006	2,266	−1.2%
2007	2,279	+0.6%
2008	2,256	−1.0%
2009	2,247	−0.4%
2010	2,227	−0.9%
2011	2,186	−1.8%
2012	2,187	+0.0%
2013	2,176	−0.5%

== Population pyramid ==
Estimate data from 2011 (population:2213)

- 0–14 years: 414 people = 18.7% ▲
- 15–60 years: 1487 people = 67.2% ▼
- 60 years or older: 312 people = 14.1% ▼
