= Sajópálfala =

Coordinates: 48°10′N 20°51′E

- Village
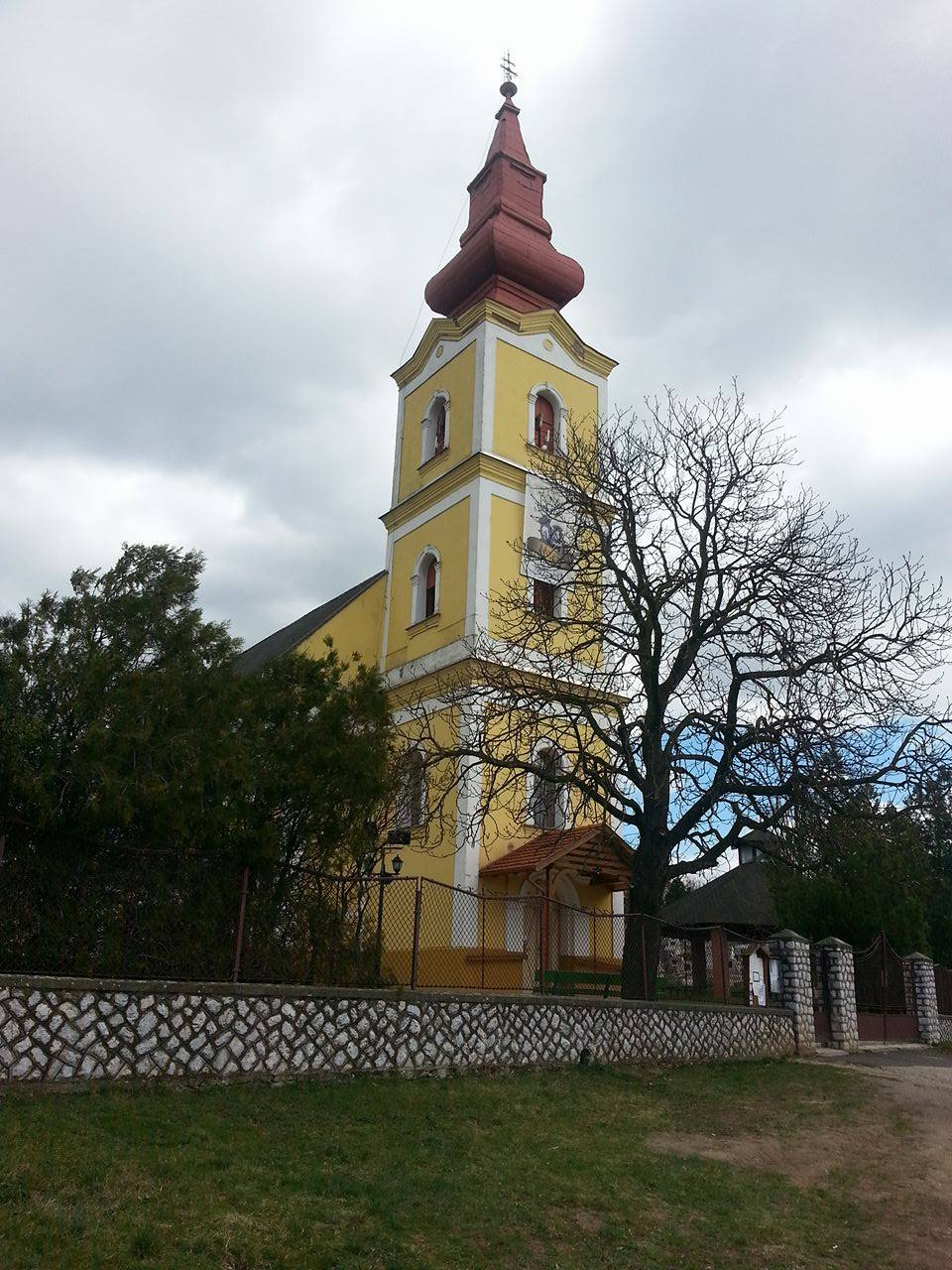

- Seal
- Interactive map of Sajópálfala
- Country: Hungary
- Regions: Northern Hungary
- County: Borsod-Abaúj-Zemplén County

Area
  - Total: 711 km^{2} (275 sq mi)

Population (2015)
  - Total: 728
- Time zone: UTC+1 (CET)
  - Summer (DST): UTC+2 (CEST)

Sajópálfala is a village in Borsod-Abaúj-Zemplén County in northeastern Hungary.
