= Szirmabesenyő =

- Large village
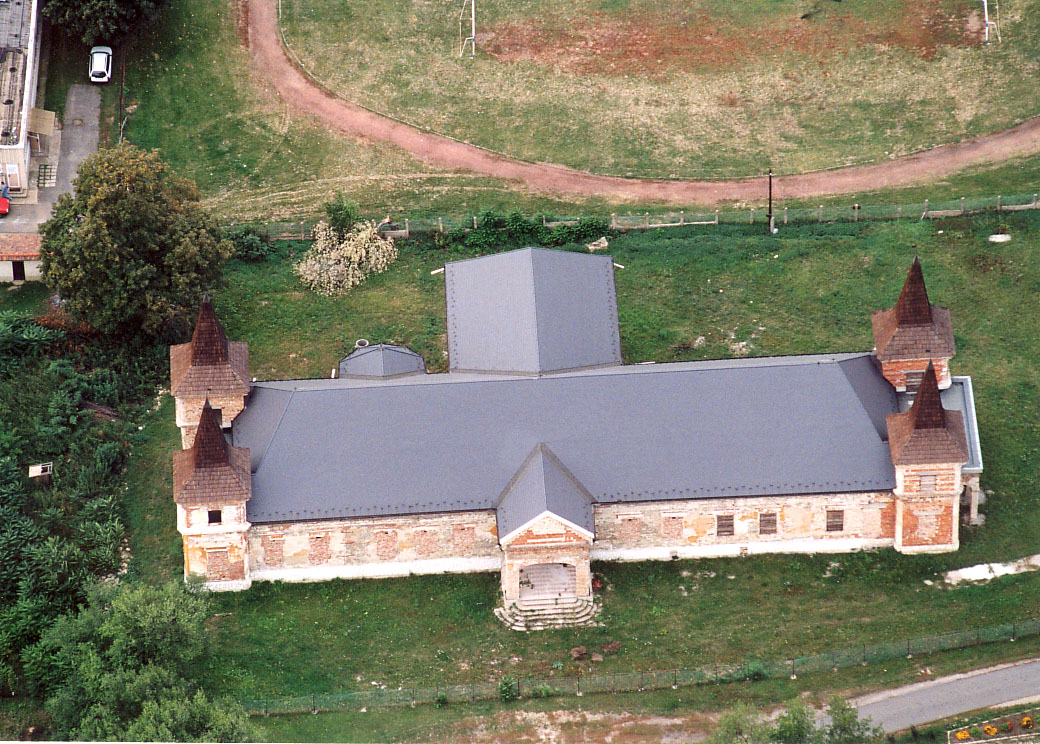
- Szirmabesenyő, Szirmay-palace from above

- Flag Coat of arms

- Location of Szirmabesenyő
- Coordinates: 48.14958°N 20.79577°E
- Country: Hungary
- Region: Northern Hungary
- County: Borsod-Abaúj-Zemplén
- District: Miskolc

Area
  - Total: 15.77 km^{2} (6.09 sq mi)

Population (1 January 2026)
  - Total: 4,334
  - Density: 274.8/km^{2} (711.8/sq mi)
- Time zone: UTC+1 (CET)
  - Summer (DST): UTC+2 (CEST)
- Postal code: 3711
- Area code: (+36) 46
- Website: szirmabesenyo.hu

Szirmabesenyő (Slovak: Bešeňovo) is a village in Borsod-Abaúj-Zemplén county, Hungary.

== Gallery ==
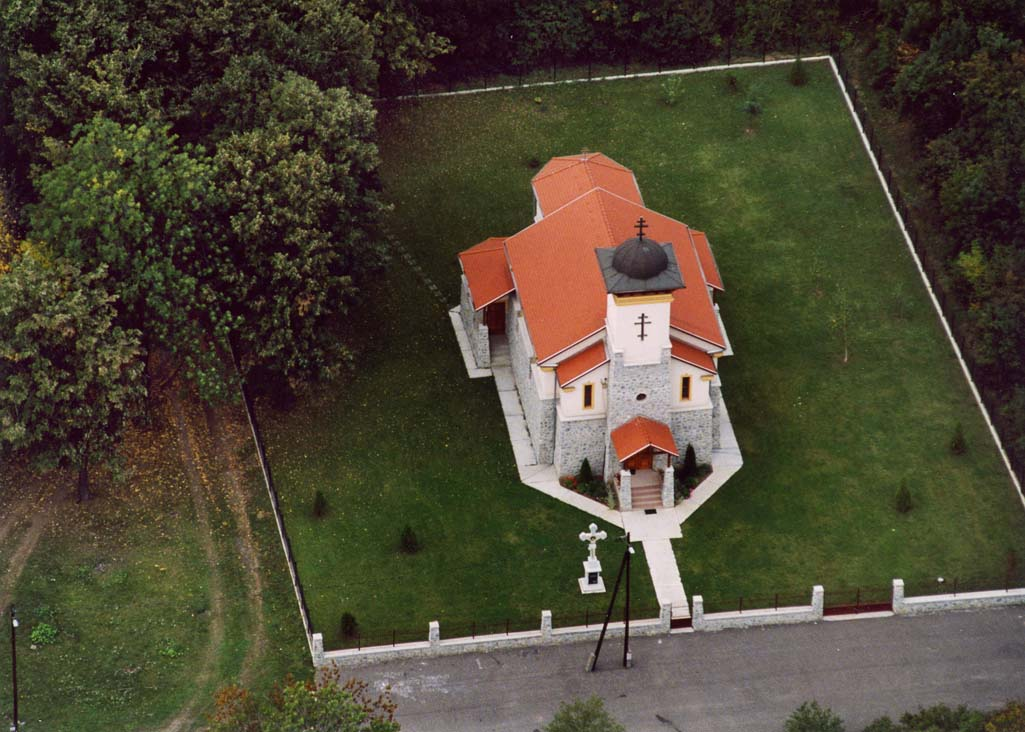
