= Bélapátfalva =

Coordinates: 48°03′N 20°22′E

- Town
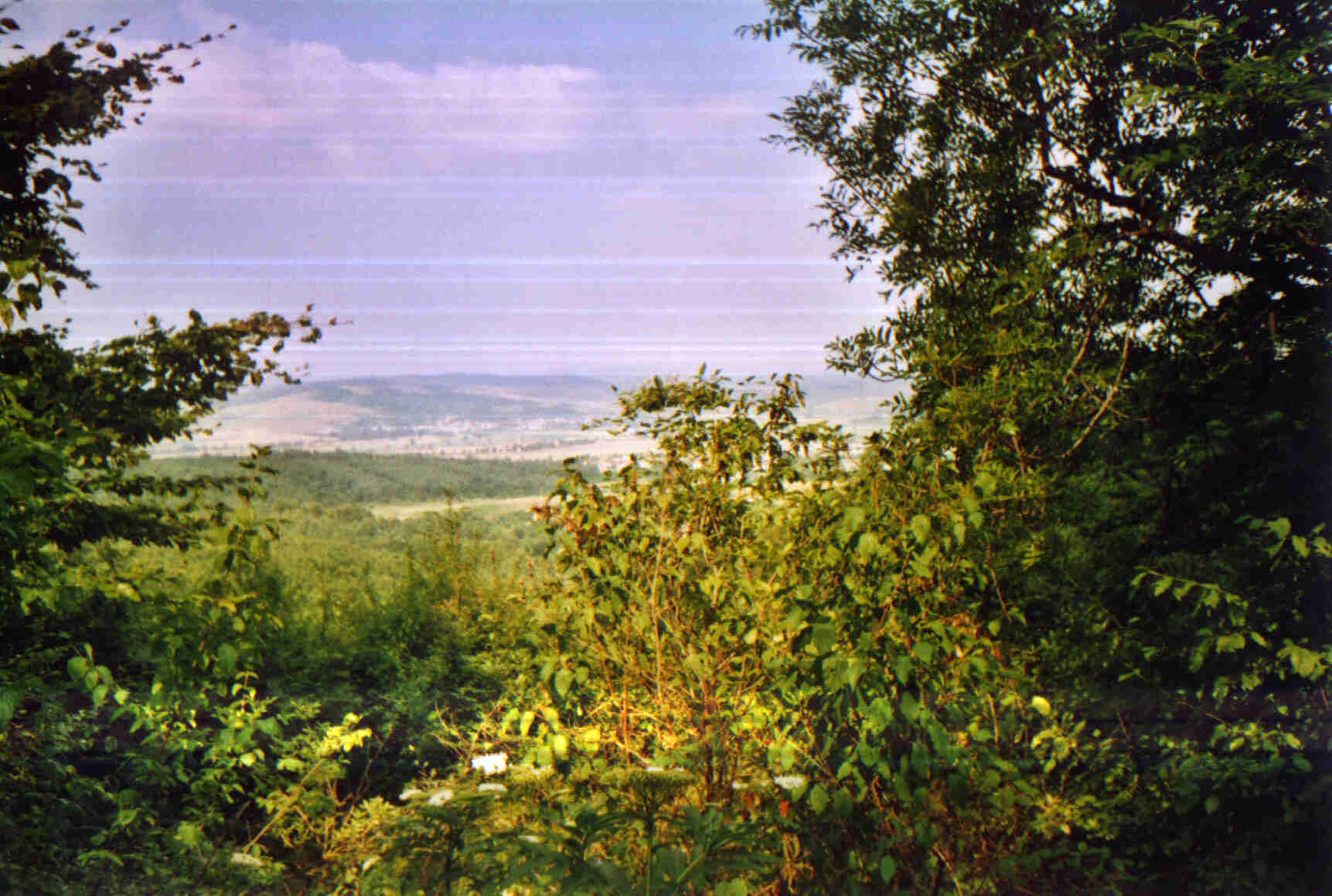

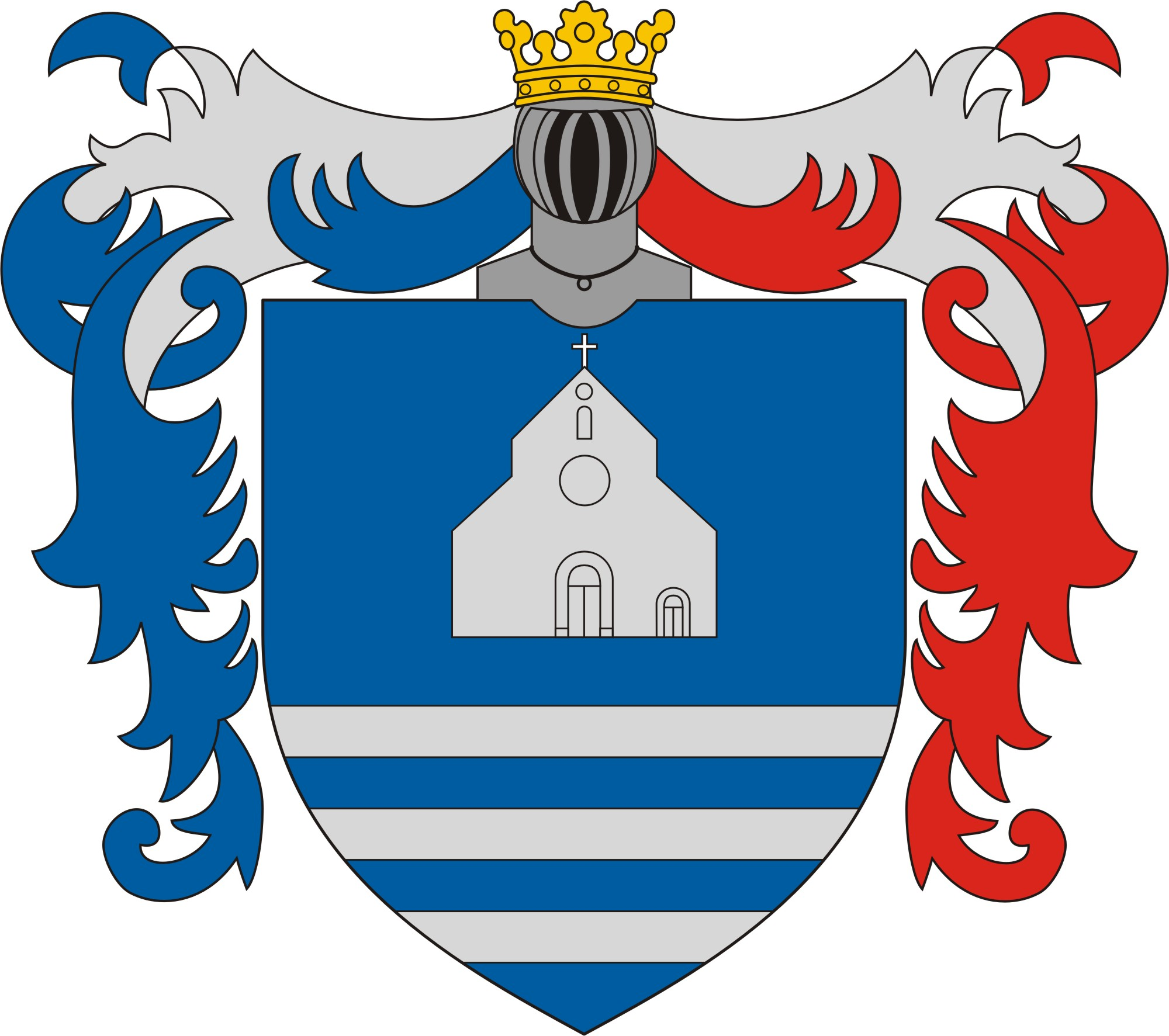
- Coat of arms
- Interactive map of Bélapátfalva
- Country: Hungary
- County: Heves
- District: Bélapátfalva

Area
  - Total: 36.17 km^{2} (13.97 sq mi)

Population (2001)
  - Total: 3,465
  - Density: 96/km^{2} (250/sq mi)
- Time zone: UTC+1 (CET)
  - Summer (DST): UTC+2 (CEST)
- Postal code: 3346
- Area code: (+36) 36
- Website: www.belapatfalva.hu

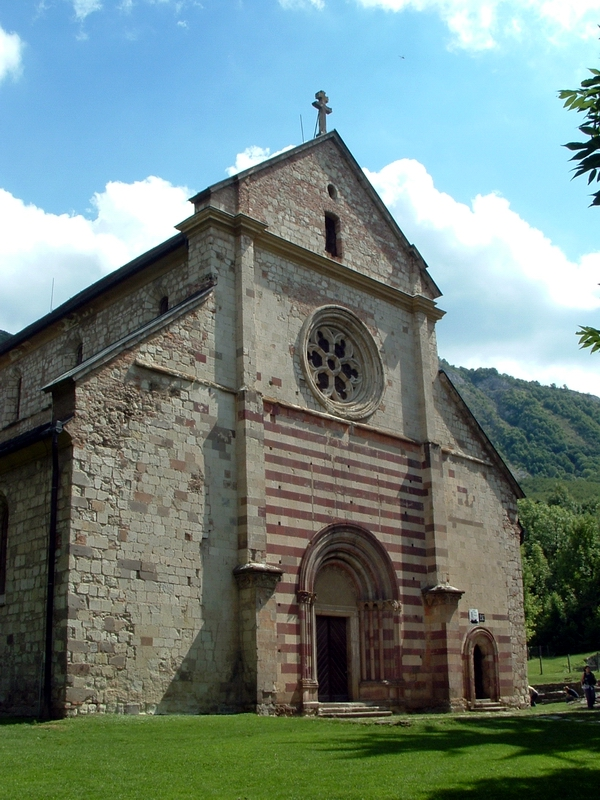
Façade of the church.

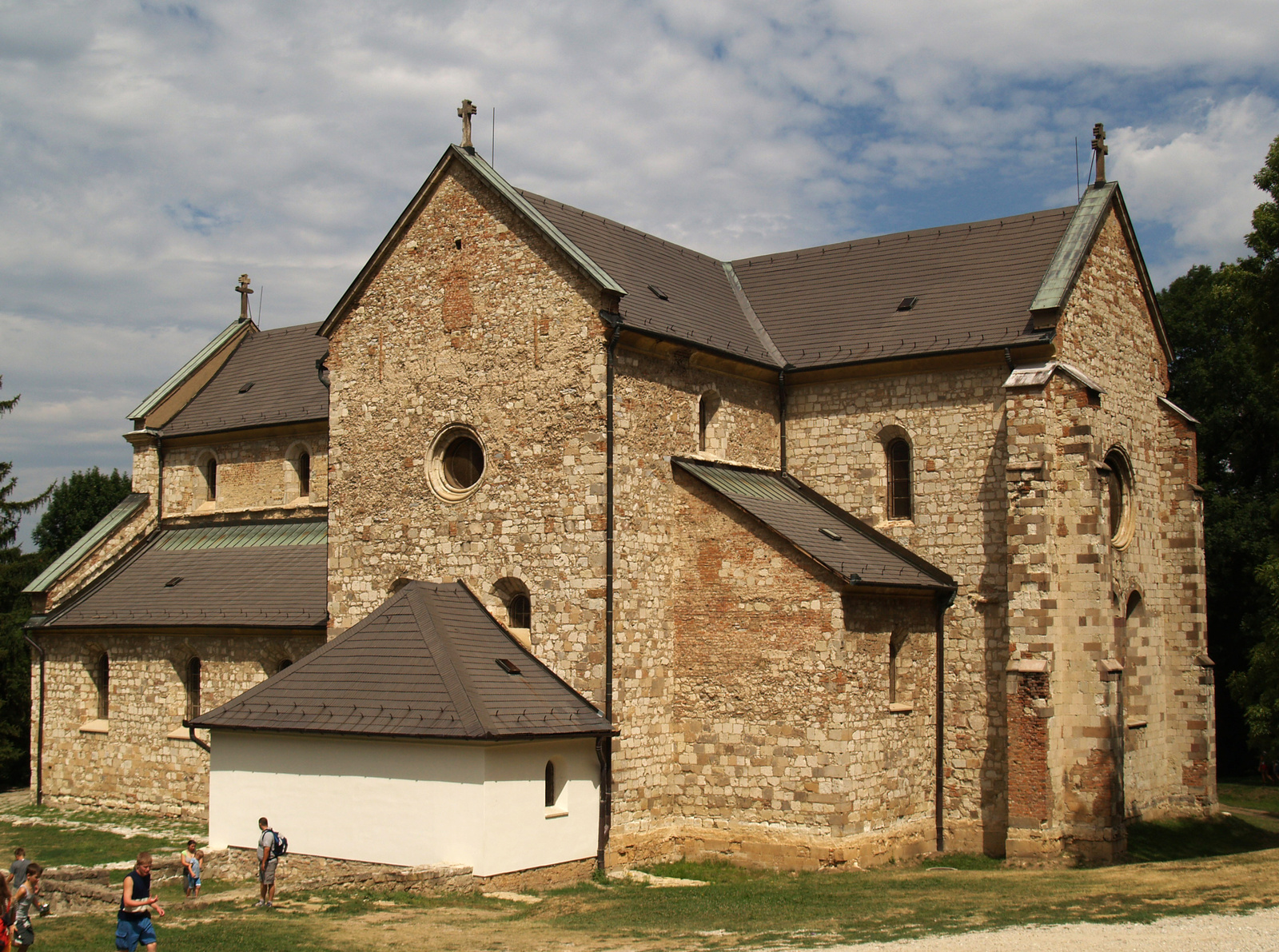
Cistercian church in Bélapátfalva

Bélapátfalva is a town in Heves County, in Hungary, located north of the city of Eger. The town is located inside the Eger river valley at an altitude of 311 meters above sea level. Facing the town is the Bél-kő mountain which rises 811 meters and is one of the highest peaks of the Bükk mountains. Because of the picturesque landscape and notable attraction the village is on the path of the National Blue Trail.

== Romanesque church of Bélapátfalva ==
The town is the site of the best-preserved Romanesque church building in Hungary, formerly part of a Cistercian abbey, established by Bishop Cletus Bél. The church was built after 1232 and later modified in Gothic style. The façade is notable for its Romanesque portal and the interplay between grey and reddish stone rows. The abbey to the south of the church was destroyed in the 16th century, and only its ruins remain. The design of the chapel of the Cistercian Our Lady of Dallas in Irving, Texas, was influenced by this church, which architect Gary Cunningham visited prior in preparation for the project.
