= Istállós-kő =

Mountain in Hungary

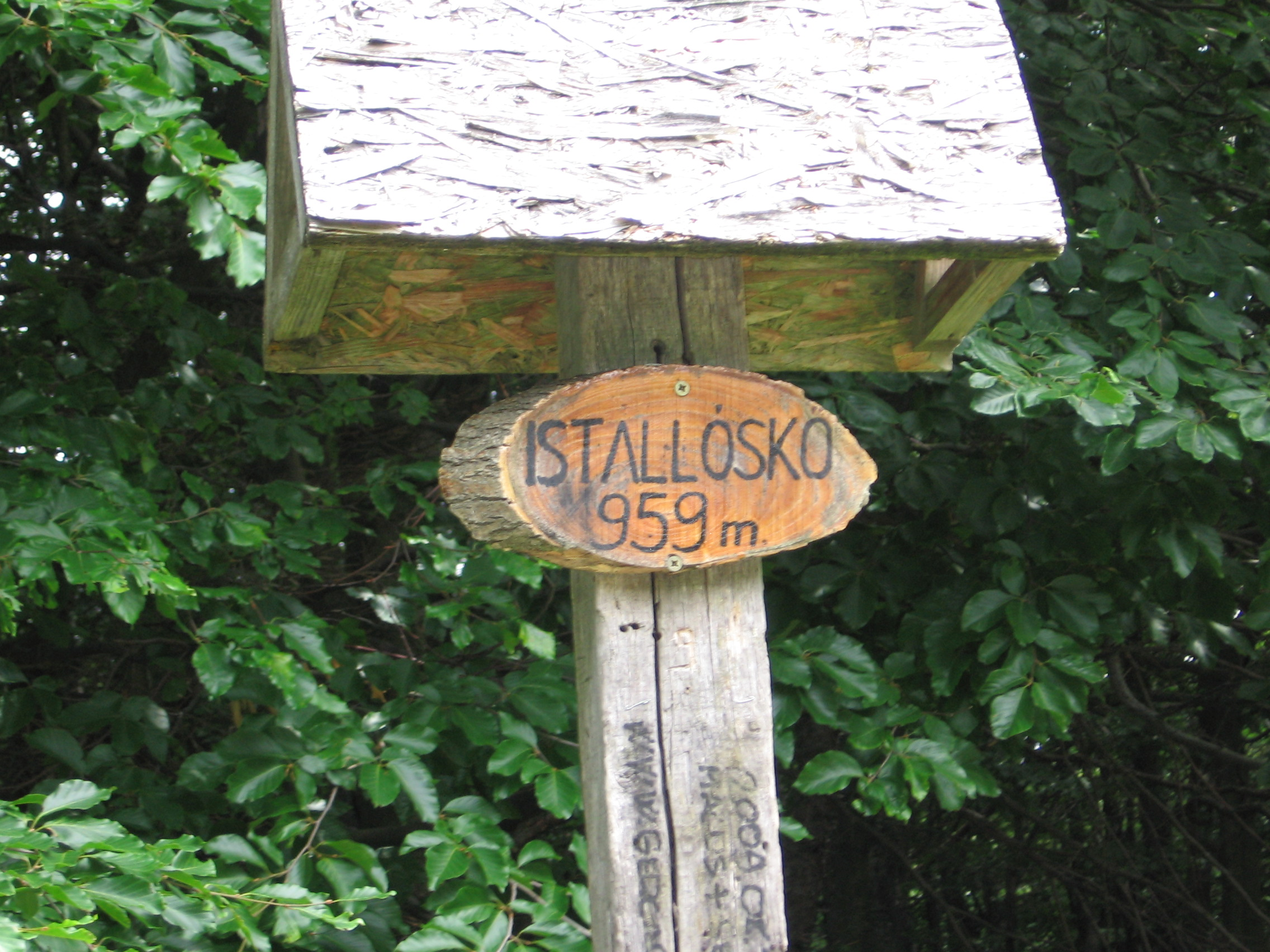

Highest point
- Elevation: 958.1 m (3,143 ft)
- Prominence: 500 m (1,600 ft)
- Coordinates: 48°4′18.67″N 20°25′8.06″E

Geography
- Location within Hungary
- Location: Heves county, Hungary
- Parent range: Mátra, Western Carpathians

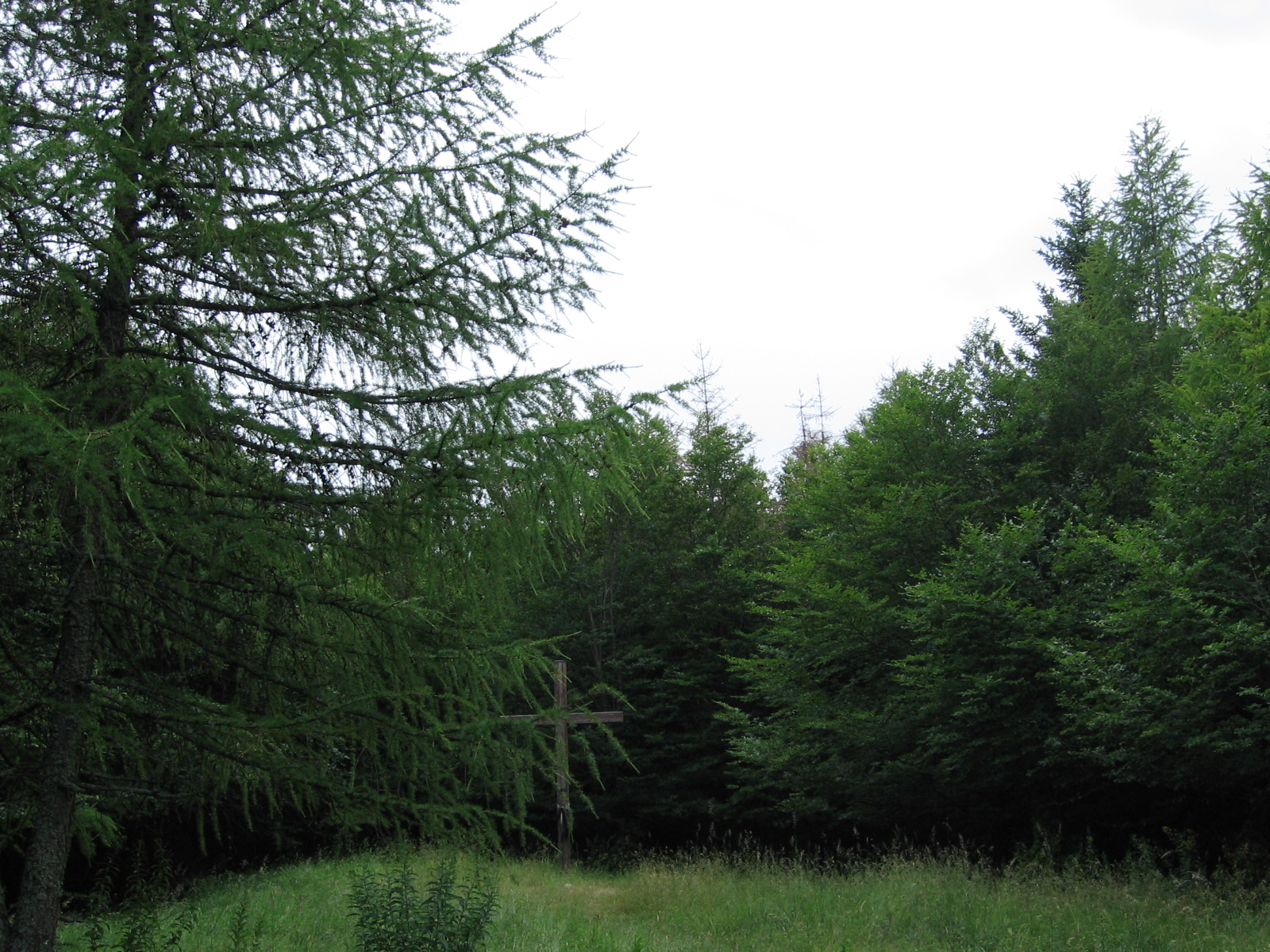
View from the mountain

Istállós-kő (Hungarian: [ˈiʃtaːlloːʃkøː]) is a mountain in Hungary. With a height of 958.1 metres (3,143 ft) above sea level, it is the second highest mountain of the Bükk mountains and the sixth highest of Hungary. Before 2014 it was considered to be the highest point of the area, but according to recent surveys Szilvási-kő is 960.715 metres (3,151.95 ft) meters high.

It is easily accessible from Szilvásvárad on a few hundred meters long tourist path, which leads to a cave in the mountain.

== Istállós-kő cave ==
The cave was first explored by Pál Roskó in 1911. It is a rich archaeological site with 30,000-40,000 year old finds including cave bear and Bison latifrons bones and tusks, stone and bone tools and a Paleolithic hearth now displayed in the Hungarian National Museum.

The site was later excavated by Ottokár Kadić in 1929 and Mária Mottl in 1938; its planned and detailed excavation started in 1947 and was led by László Vértes. Based on fill stratification and animal remains used as period indicators, the archaeologists explored the cave's history, and determined the age of the three cultural layers and the characteristics of the human population(s) that lived there. The cave gained protected status in 1944 and specially protected status in 1982.

The newest excavations started in 2000 and were led by Árpád Ringer. The importance of the cave lies in the findings of 66 different Ice Age species, which makes its fauna the richest among Aurignacian faunas in Europe; three new mammal species and twenty new bird species were described based on its microfauna.
