= Szilvásvárad =

- Village (község)
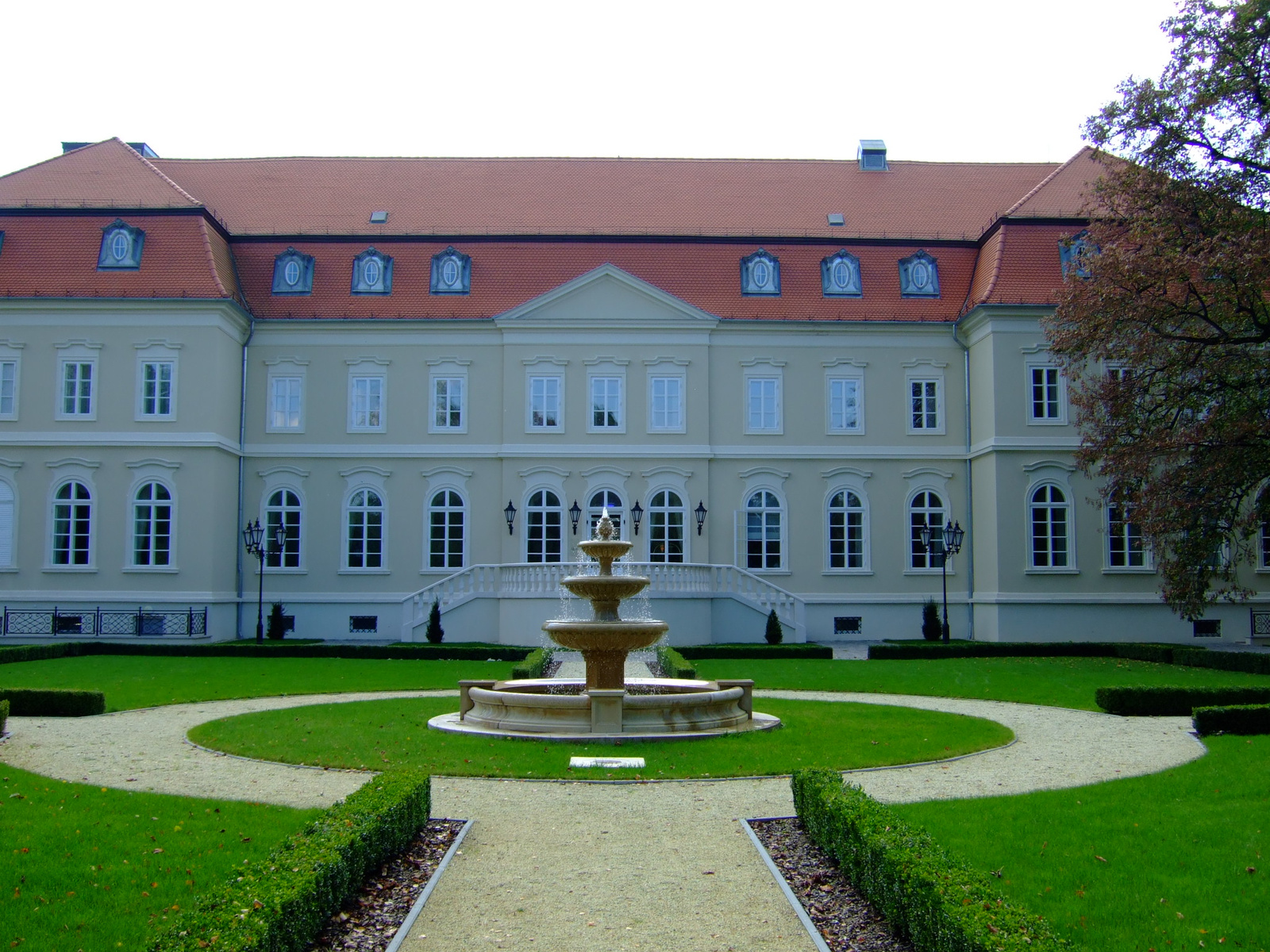
- Erdődy-Pallavicini-castle

- Coat of arms

- Location of Szilvásvárad in Hungary Location of Szilvásvárad in Heves County
- Coordinates: 48°06′14″N 20°23′13″E
- Country: Hungary
- Region: Northern Hungary
- County: Heves County
- Subregion: Bélapátfalva District

Government
  - Mayor: László Szaniszló

Area
  - Total: 37.82 km^{2} (14.60 sq mi)

Population (1 Jan. 2015)
  - Total: 1,621
  - Density: 42.91/km^{2} (111.1/sq mi)
- Time zone: UTC+1 (CET)
  - Summer (DST): UTC+2 (CEST)
- Postal code: 3348
- Area code: 36
- Website: www.szilvasvarad.hu

Szilvásvárad is a village in Heves County, Northern Hungary Region, Hungary.

== Sights to visit ==
- Szalajka-valley
- Fátyol-waterfall
- Istállós-kő cave
- Cserepes-kő-cave
- Kalapat viewpoint
- Virgin forest
- Forest museum
- Wood railway of Szilvásvárad
- Horse museum
- Orbán-house
- Lipizzan stud farm
- Protestant round church
- Erdődy-Pallavicini-castle
- Prison-museum

== Gallery ==
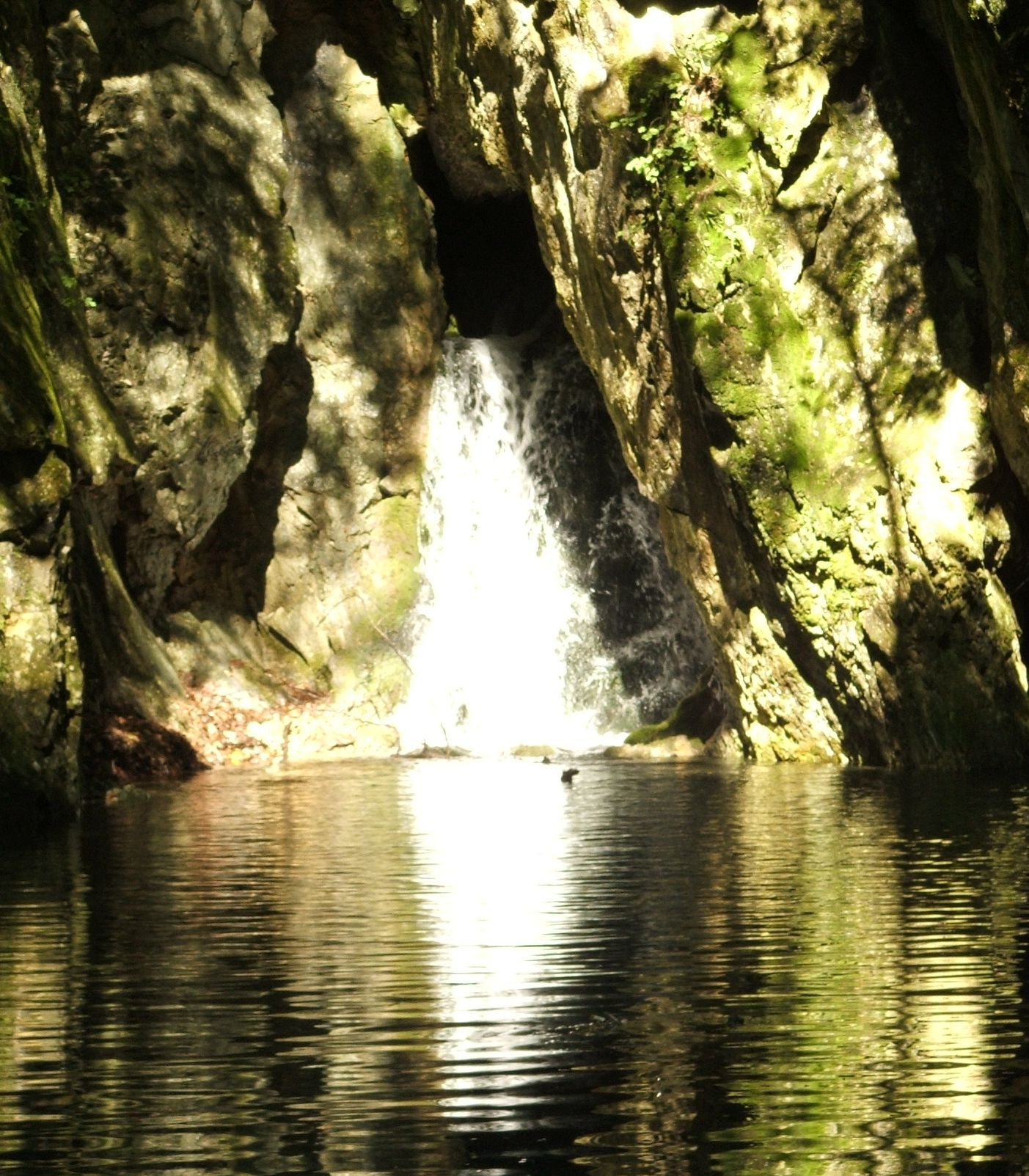
Fátyol-waterfall in the Szalajka-valley

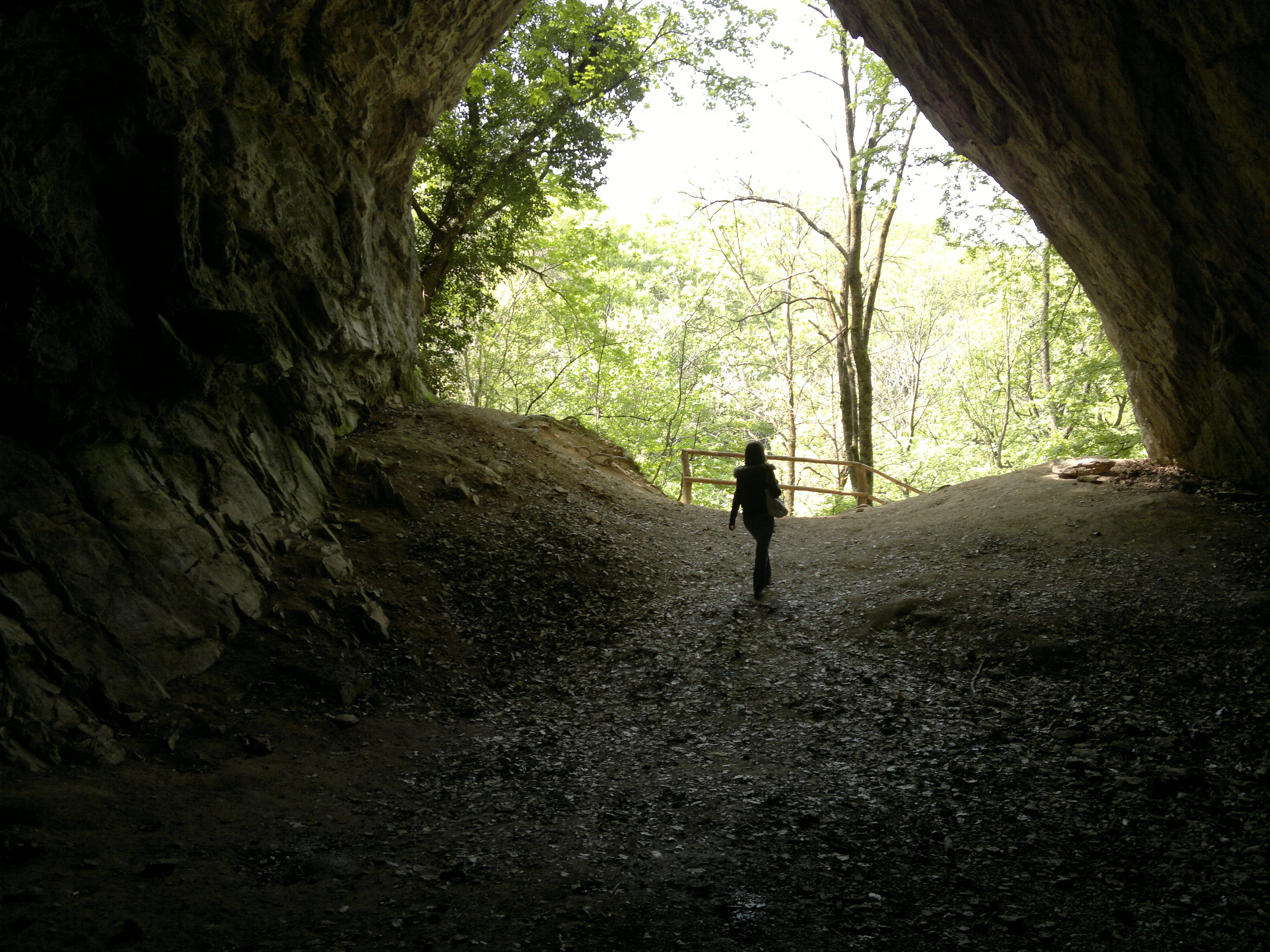
Istállós-kő-cave

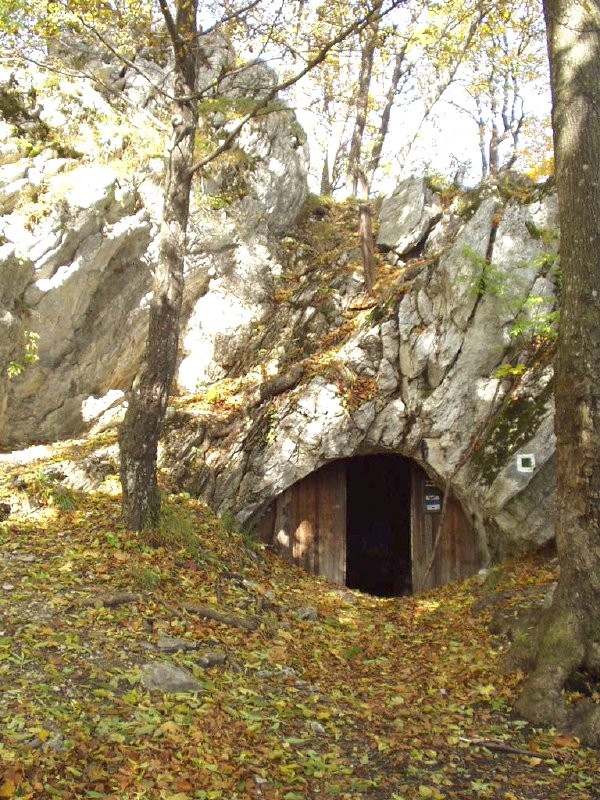
Cserepes-kő-cave

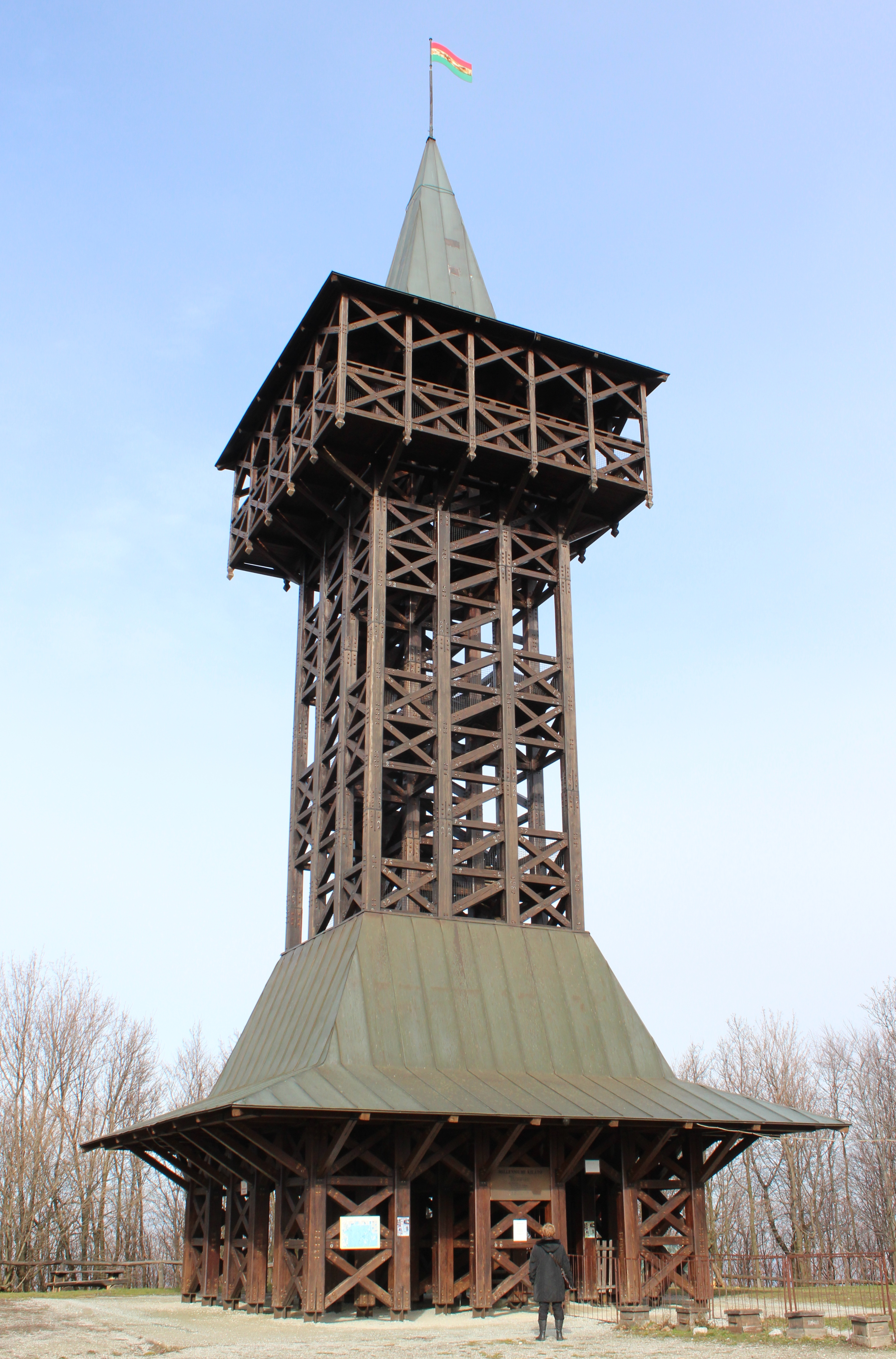
Kalapat viewing tower

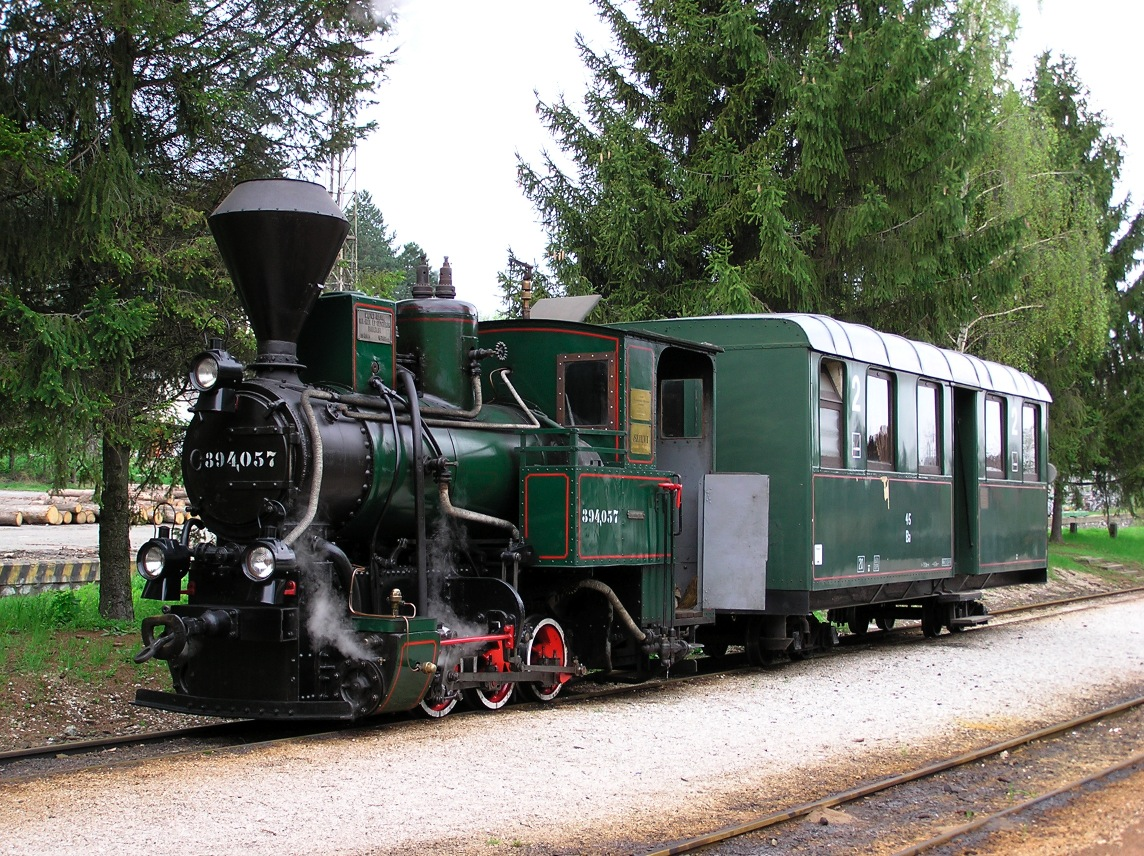
Steam engine of the wood railway

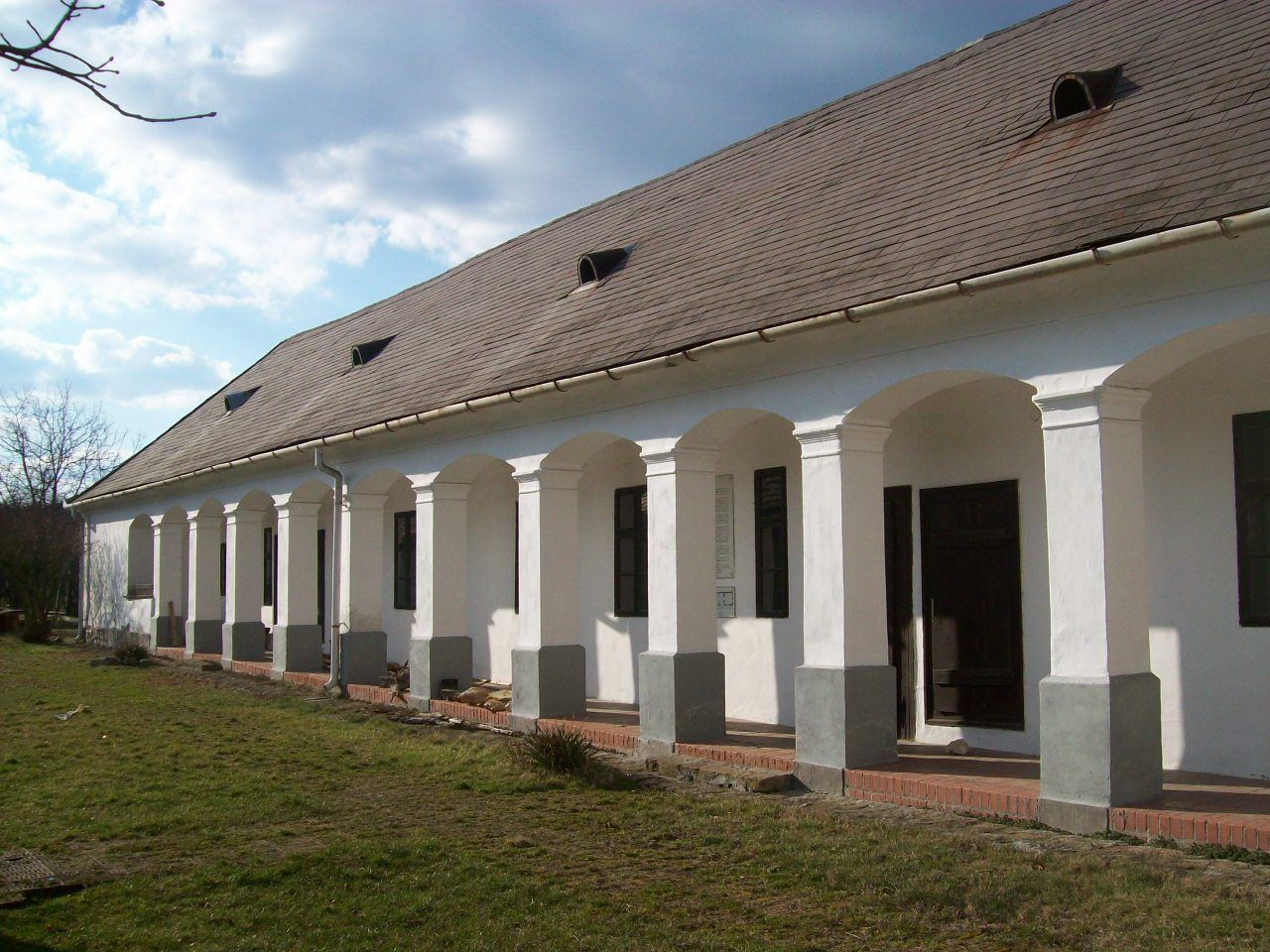
Orbán-house

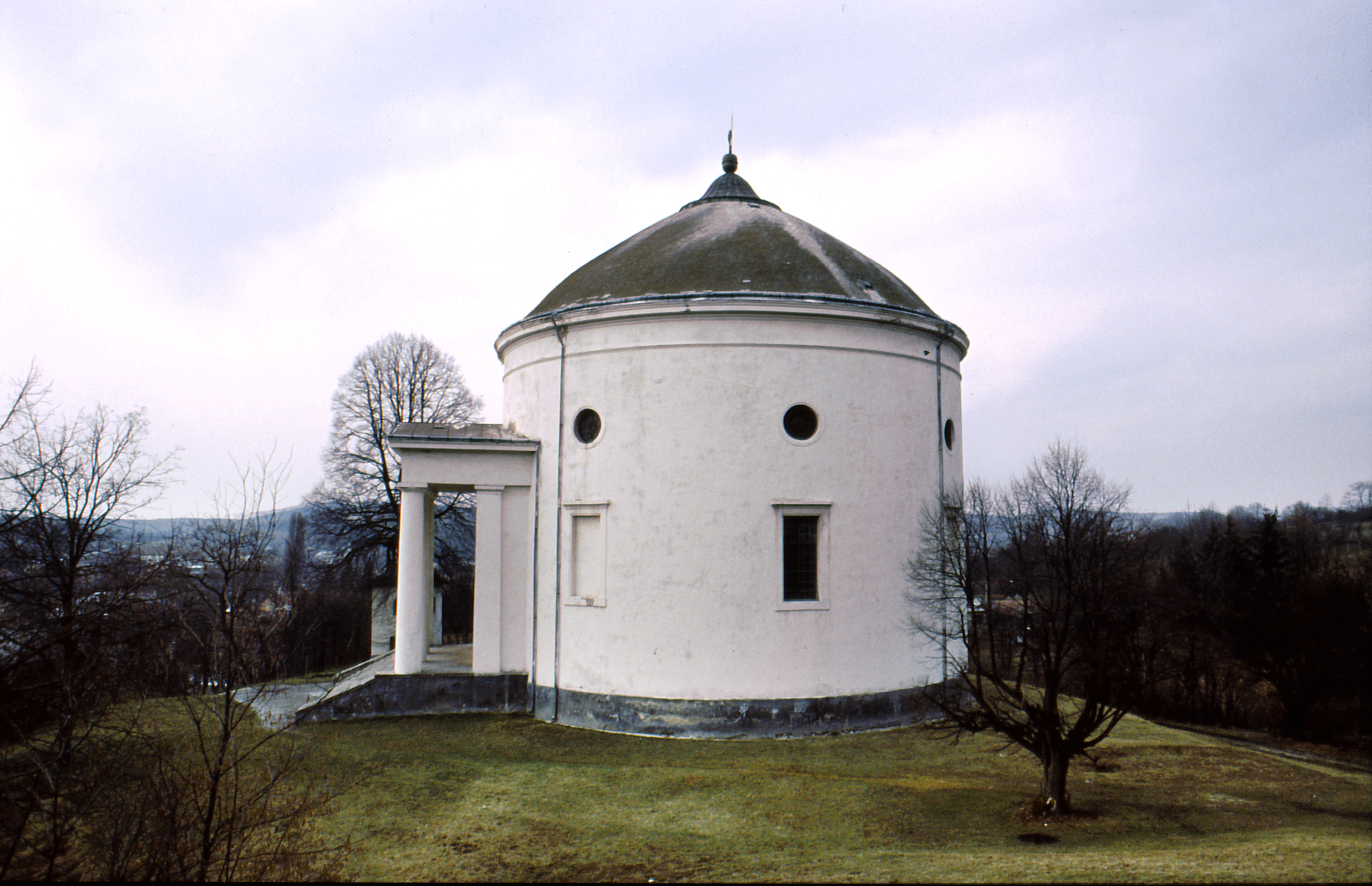
Protestant round church

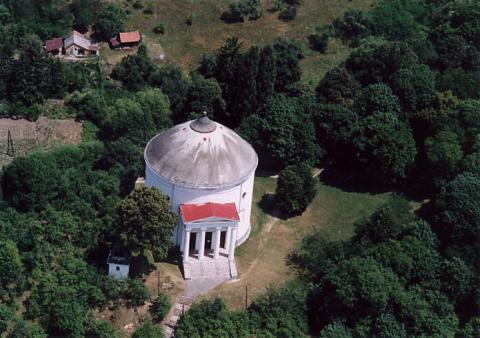

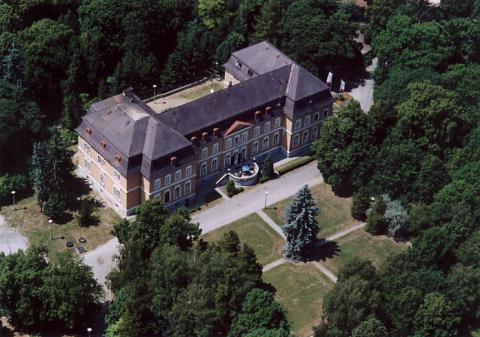

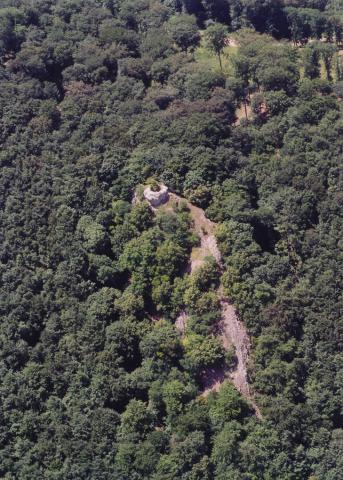

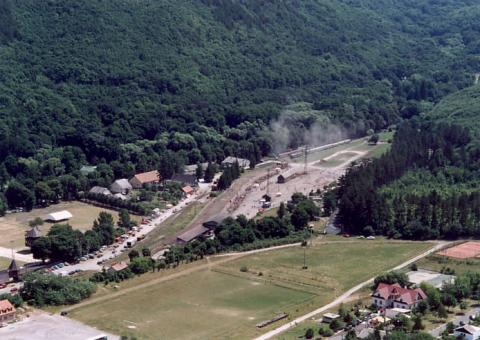

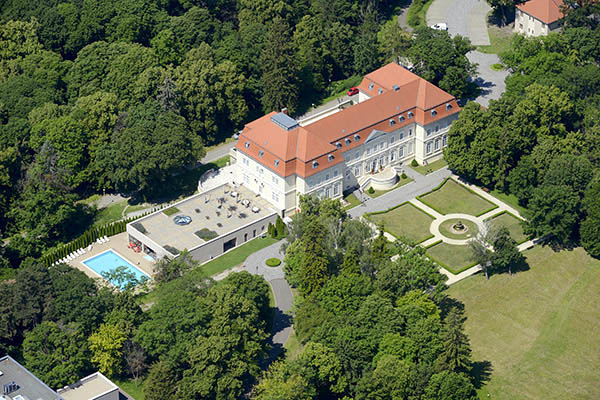

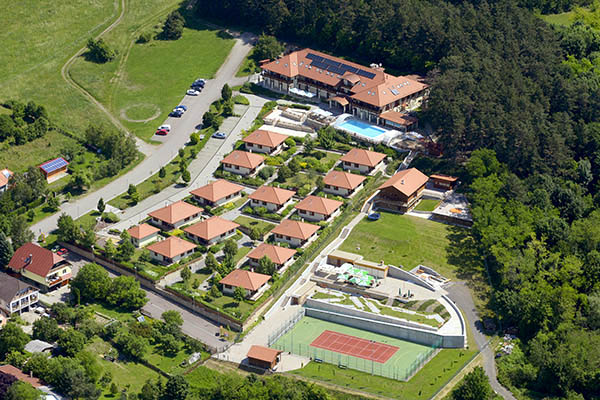

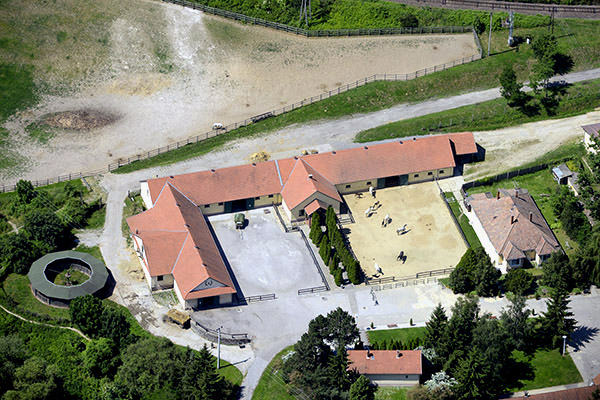

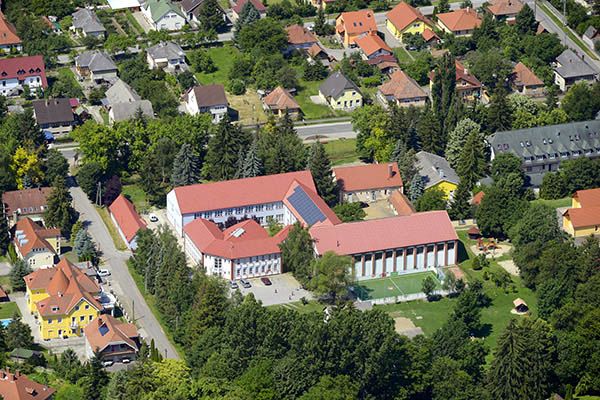

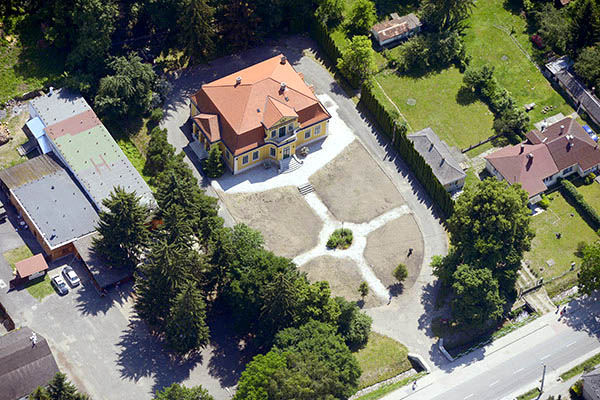
