= Bekölce =

- Village (község)
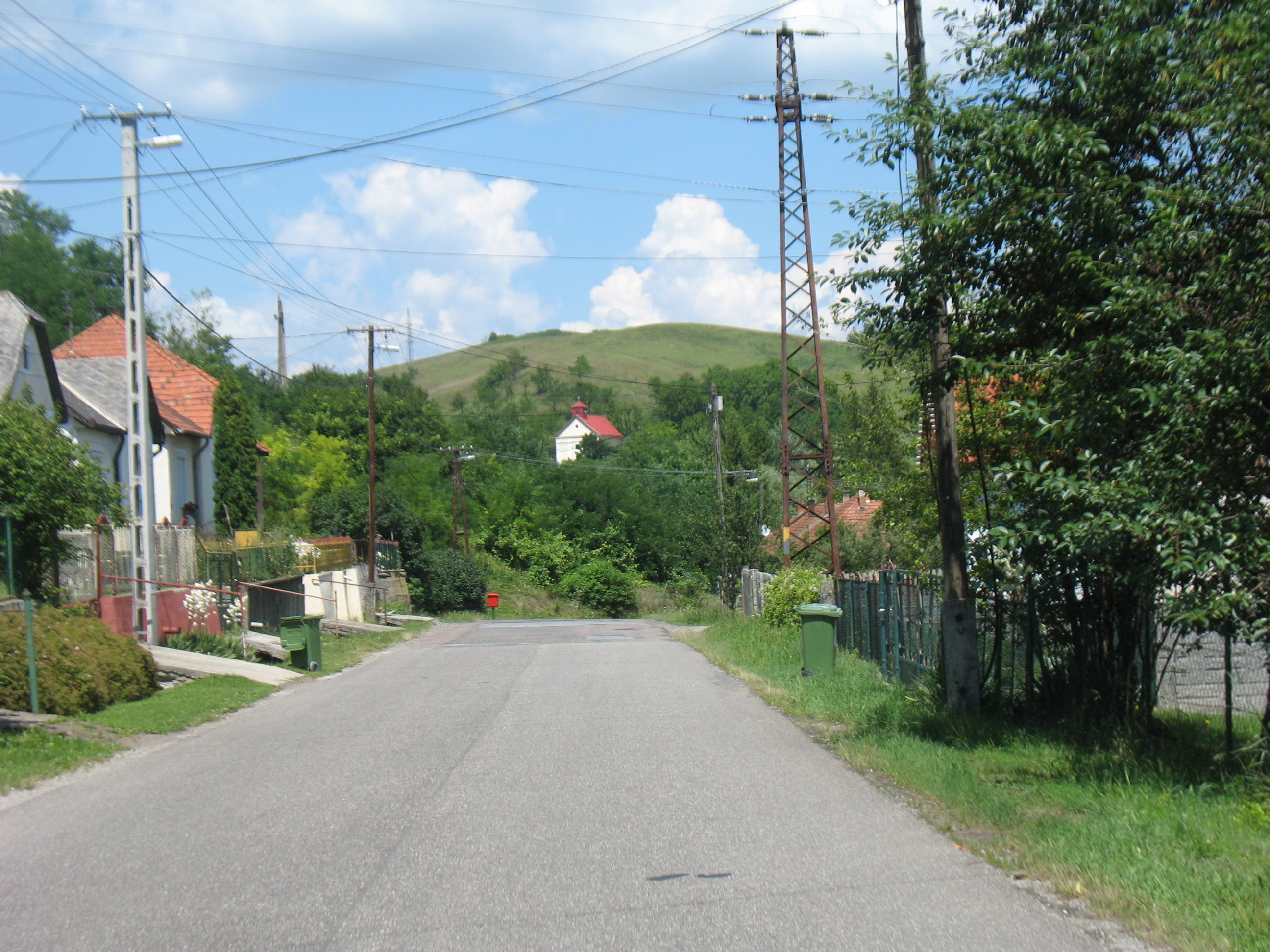

- Coat of arms

- Location of Heves County in Hungary

- Location in Hungary
- Coordinates: 48°04′18″N 20°16′27″E
- Country: Hungary
- Region: Northern Hungary
- County: Heves County
- District: Bélapátfalva

Government
  - Mayor: Gálné Mátrai Ágnes (Ind.)

Area
  - Total: 13.77 km^{2} (5.32 sq mi)

Population (2015)
  - Total: 591
  - Density: 42.9/km^{2} (111/sq mi)
- Time zone: UTC+1 (CET)
  - Summer (DST): UTC+2 (CEST)
- Postal code: 3343
- Area code: 36
- Website: https://www.bekolce.hu/

Bekölce is a village in Heves County, Hungary.
