= Bükkszentmárton =

- Village (község)
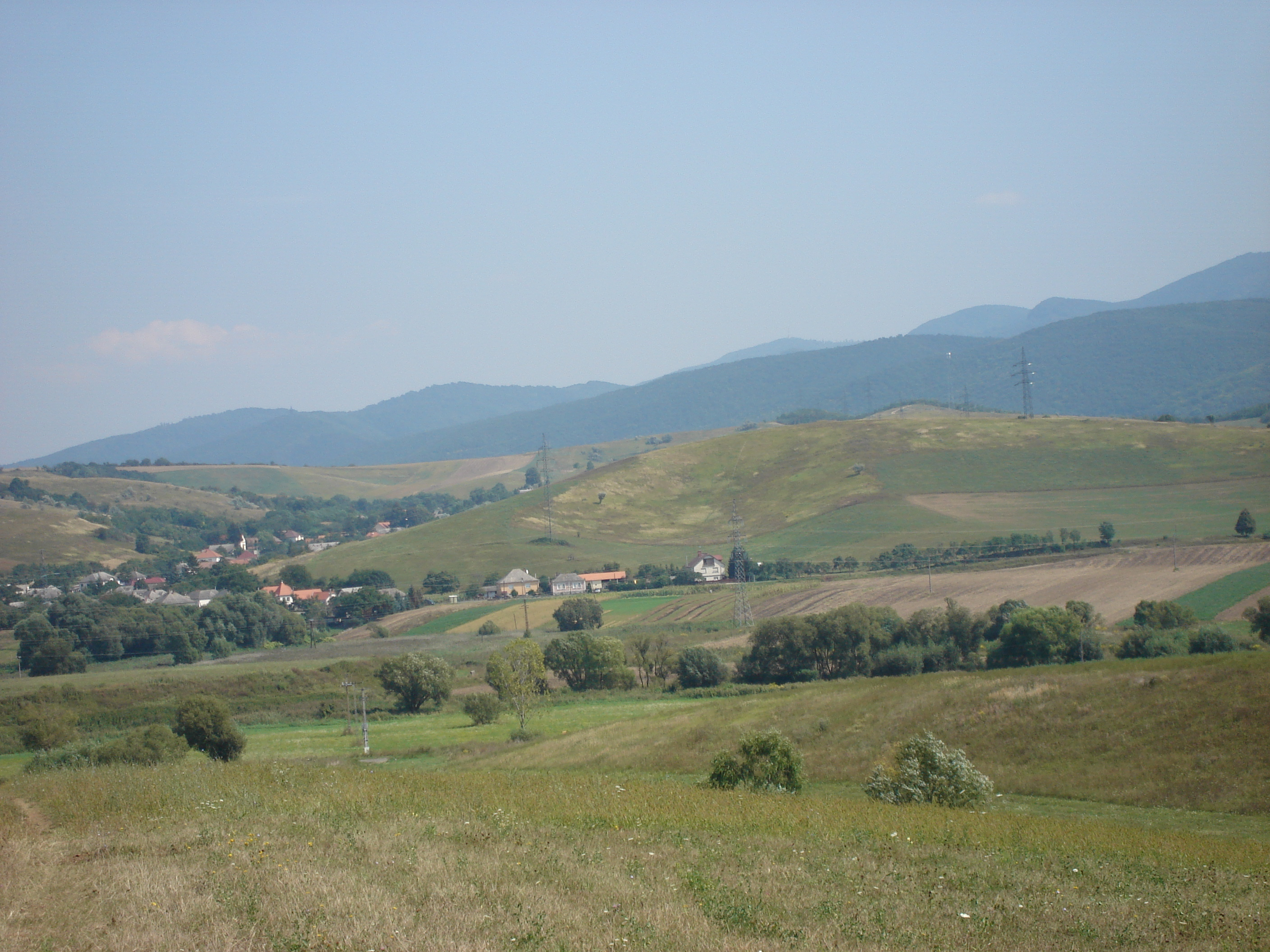

- Coat of arms

- Location of Heves County in Hungary

- Location in Hungary
- Coordinates: 48°04′19″N 20°19′52″E
- Country: Hungary
- Region: Northern Hungary
- County: Heves County
- District: Bélapátfalva

Government
  - Mayor: Róbert Liktor (Ind.)

Area
  - Total: 8.26 km^{2} (3.19 sq mi)

Population (2015)
  - Total: 295
  - Density: 35.7/km^{2} (92.5/sq mi)
- Time zone: UTC+1 (CET)
  - Summer (DST): UTC+2 (CEST)
- Postal code: 3346
- Area code: 36
- Website: http://www.bukkszentmarton.hu/

Bükkszentmárton is a village in Heves County, Hungary.
