= Bélapátfalva District =

Bélapátfalva District Bélapátfalvai járás
- District
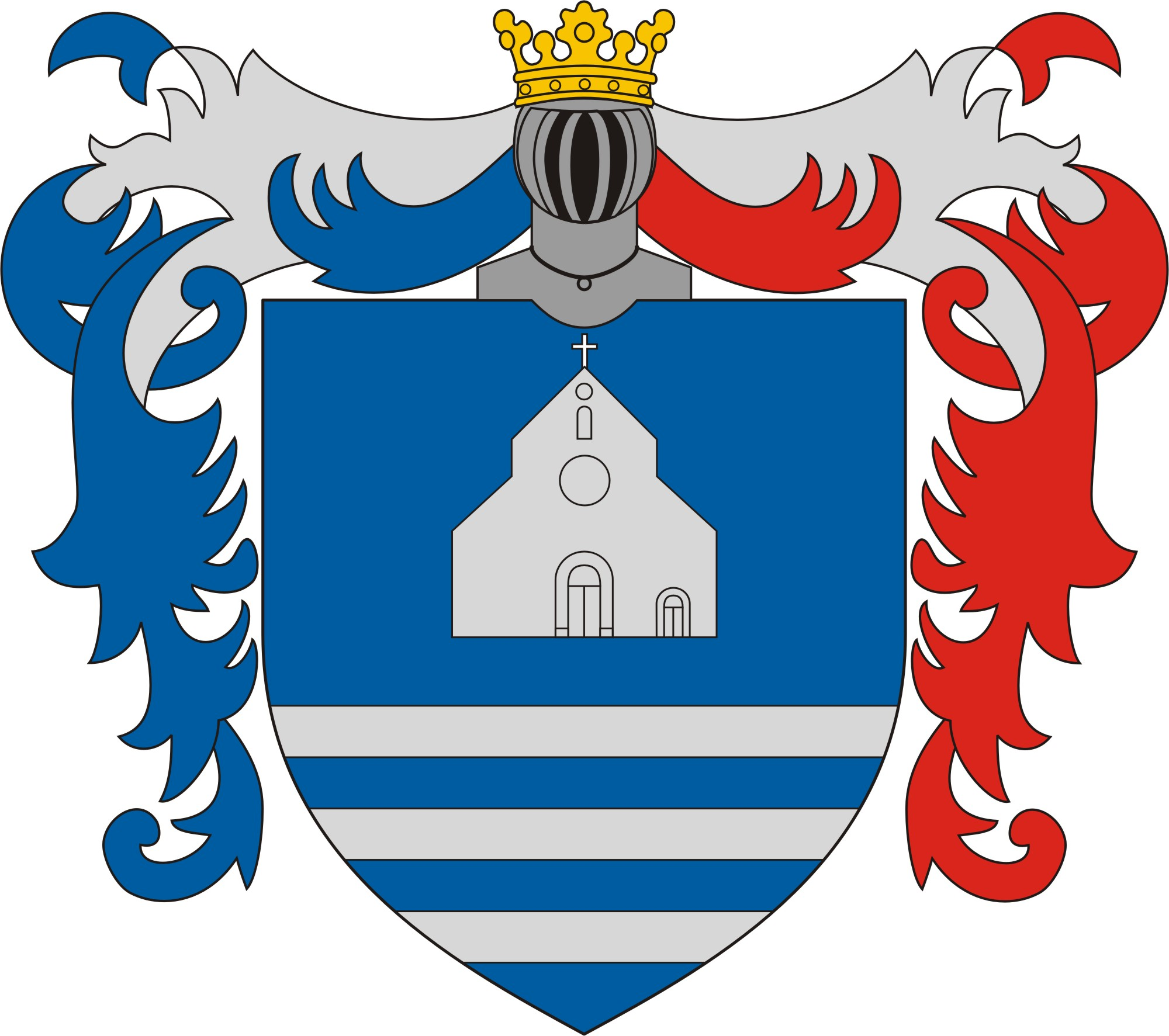
- Coat of arms

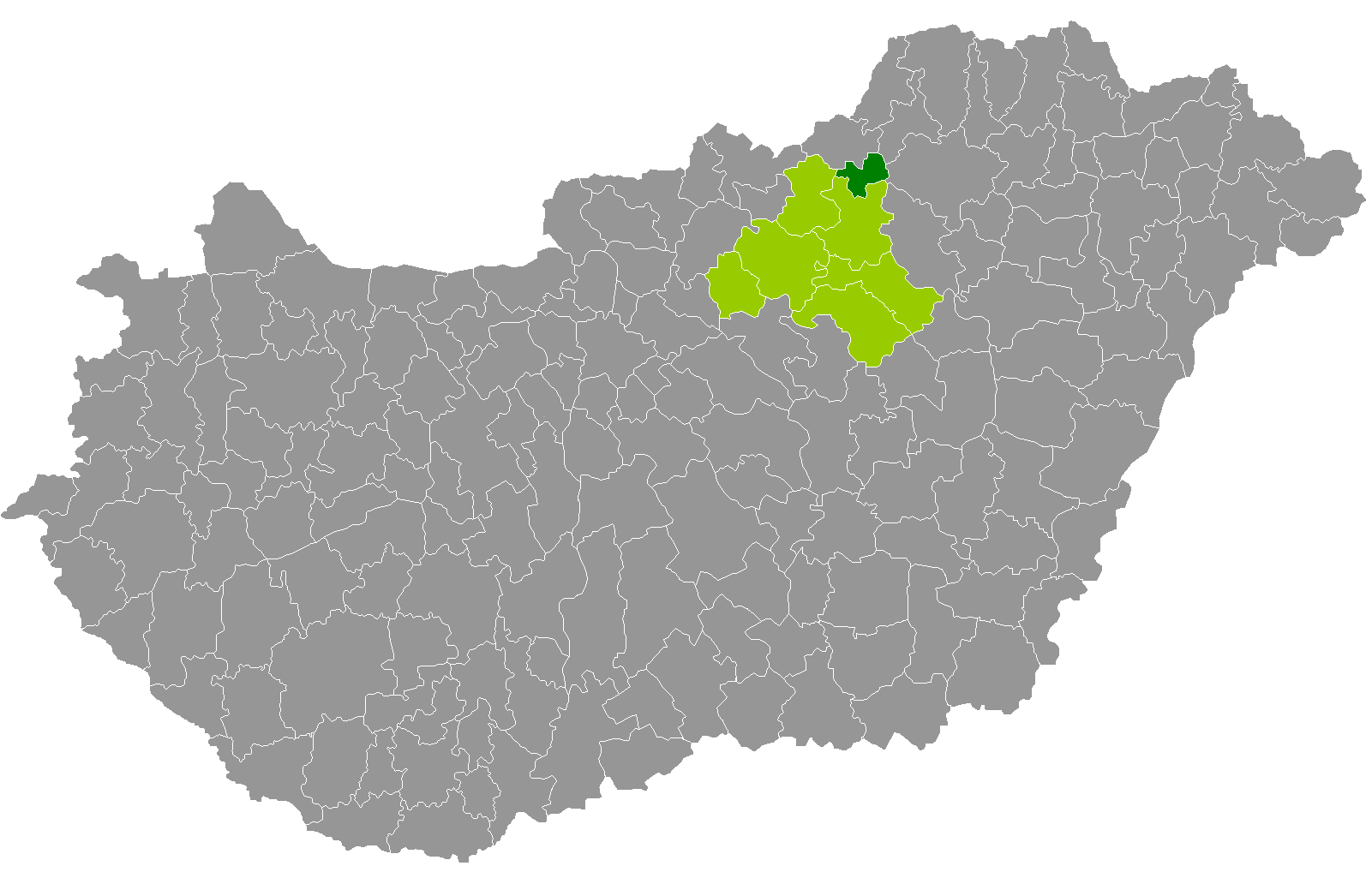
- Bélapátfalva District within Hungary and Heves County.
- Country: Hungary
- County: Heves
- District seat: Bélapátfalva

Area
  - Total: 180.89 km^{2} (69.84 sq mi)
  - Rank: 7th in Heves

Population (2011 census)
  - Total: 8,978
  - Rank: 7th in Heves
  - Density: 50/km^{2} (130/sq mi)

Bélapátfalva (Hungarian: Bélapátfalvai járás) is a district in north-eastern part of Heves County. Bélapátfalva is also the name of the town where the district seat is found. The district is located in the Northern Hungary Statistical Region. This district is a part of Bükk Mountains geographical region.

== Geography ==
Bélapátfalva District borders with Ózd District and Kazincbarcika District (Borsod-Abaúj-Zemplén County) to the north, Miskolc District (Borsod-Abaúj-Zemplén County) to the east, Eger District to the south, Pétervására District to the west. The number of the inhabited places in Bélapátfalva District is 8.

== Municipalities ==
The district has 1 town and 7 villages. (ordered by population, as of 1 January 2012)

- Balaton (1,038)
- Bekölce (637)
- **Bélapátfalva** (2,996) – district seat
- Bükkszentmárton (305)
- Mikófalva (720)
- Mónosbél (416)
- Nagyvisnyó (938)
- Szilvásvárad (1,660)

The bolded municipality is the city.

== Demographics ==
Religion in Bélapátfalva District (2011 census)
1. Catholic Church (47.0%)
2. Greek Catholicism (0.30%)
3. Calvinism (14.2%)
4. Lutheranism (0.20%)
5. Other religions (1.10%)
6. Non-religious (12.0%)
7. Atheists (0.70%)
8. Undeclared (24.5%)

In 2011, it had a population of 8,978 and the population density was 50/km^{2}.

Year	County population	Change
2011	8,978	n/a

=== Ethnicity ===
Besides the Hungarian majority, the main minority is the Roma (approx. 500).

Total population (2011 census): 8,978
Ethnic groups (2011 census): Identified themselves: 8,209 persons:

- Hungarians: 7,695 (93.74%)
- Gypsies: 421 (5.13%)
- Others and indefinable: 93 (1.13%)

Approx. 1,000 persons in Bélapátfalva District did not declare their ethnic group at the 2011 census.

=== Religion ===
Religious adherence in the county according to 2011 census:

- Catholic – 4,246 (Roman Catholic – 4,218; Greek Catholic – 28);
- Reformed – 1,274;
- Evangelical – 20;
- other religions – 96;
- Non-religious – 1,081;
- Atheism – 65;
- Undeclared – 2,196.

== Gallery ==
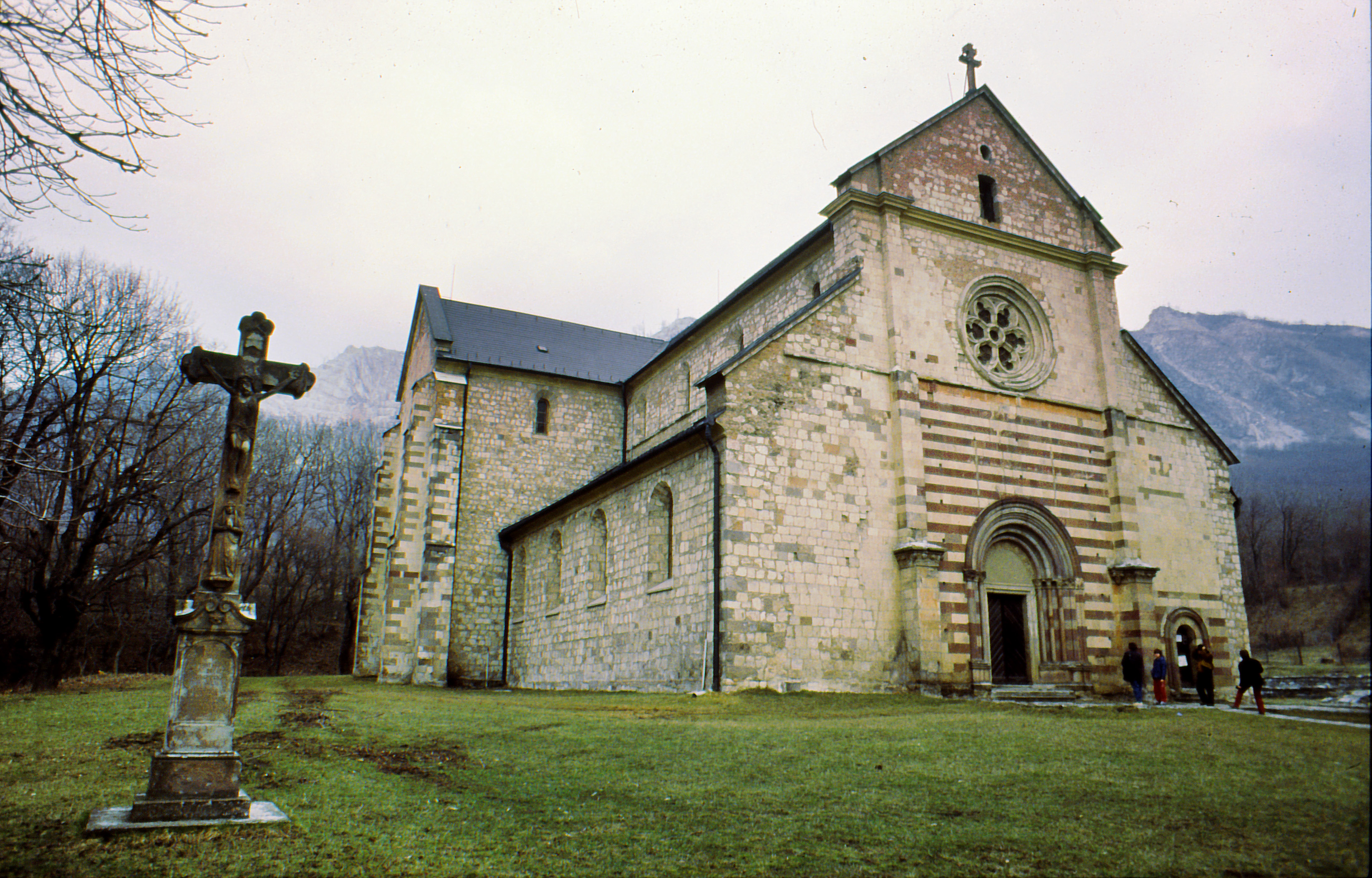
Bélapátfalva, the district seat

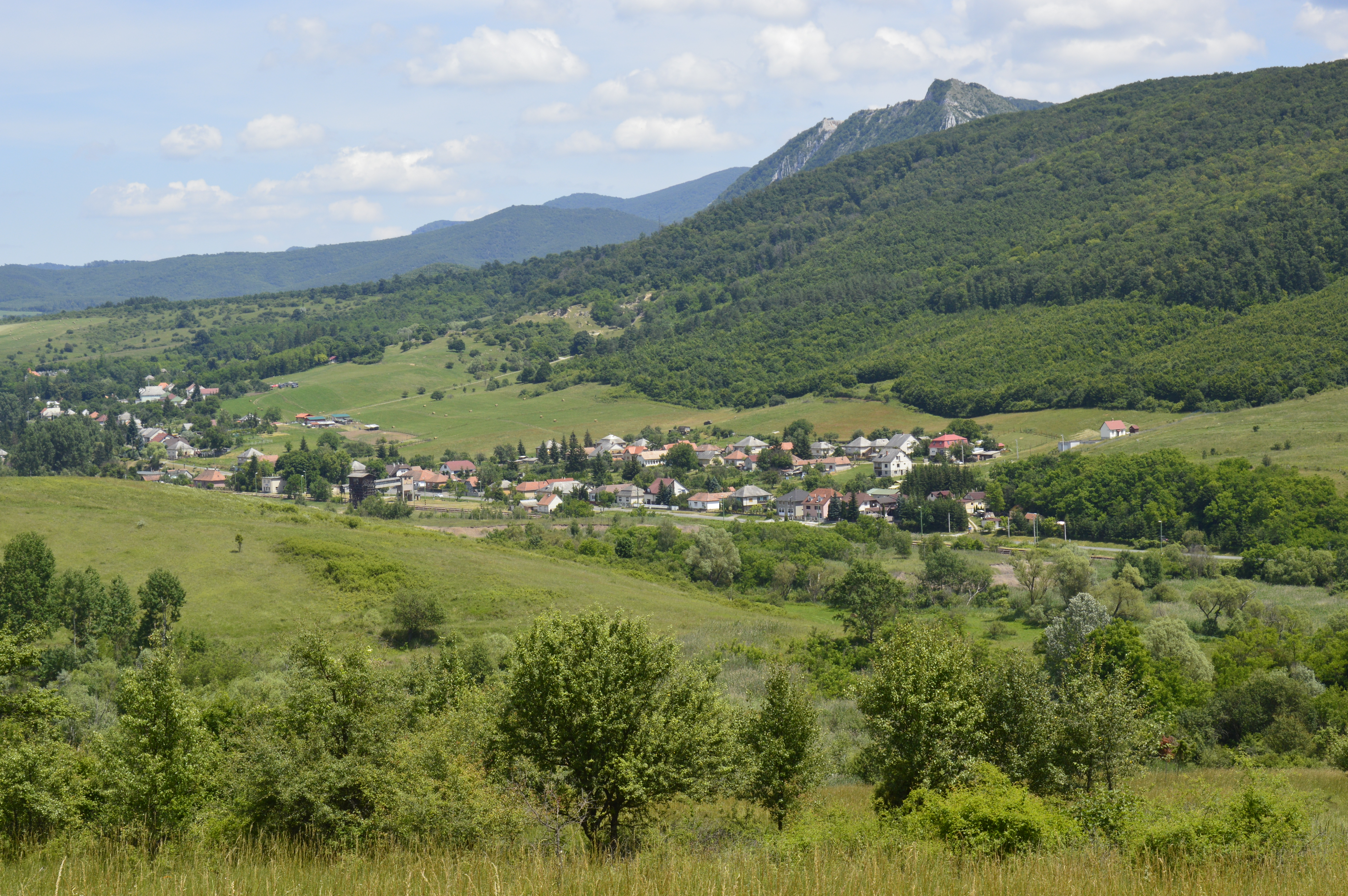
Aerial view of Mónosbél

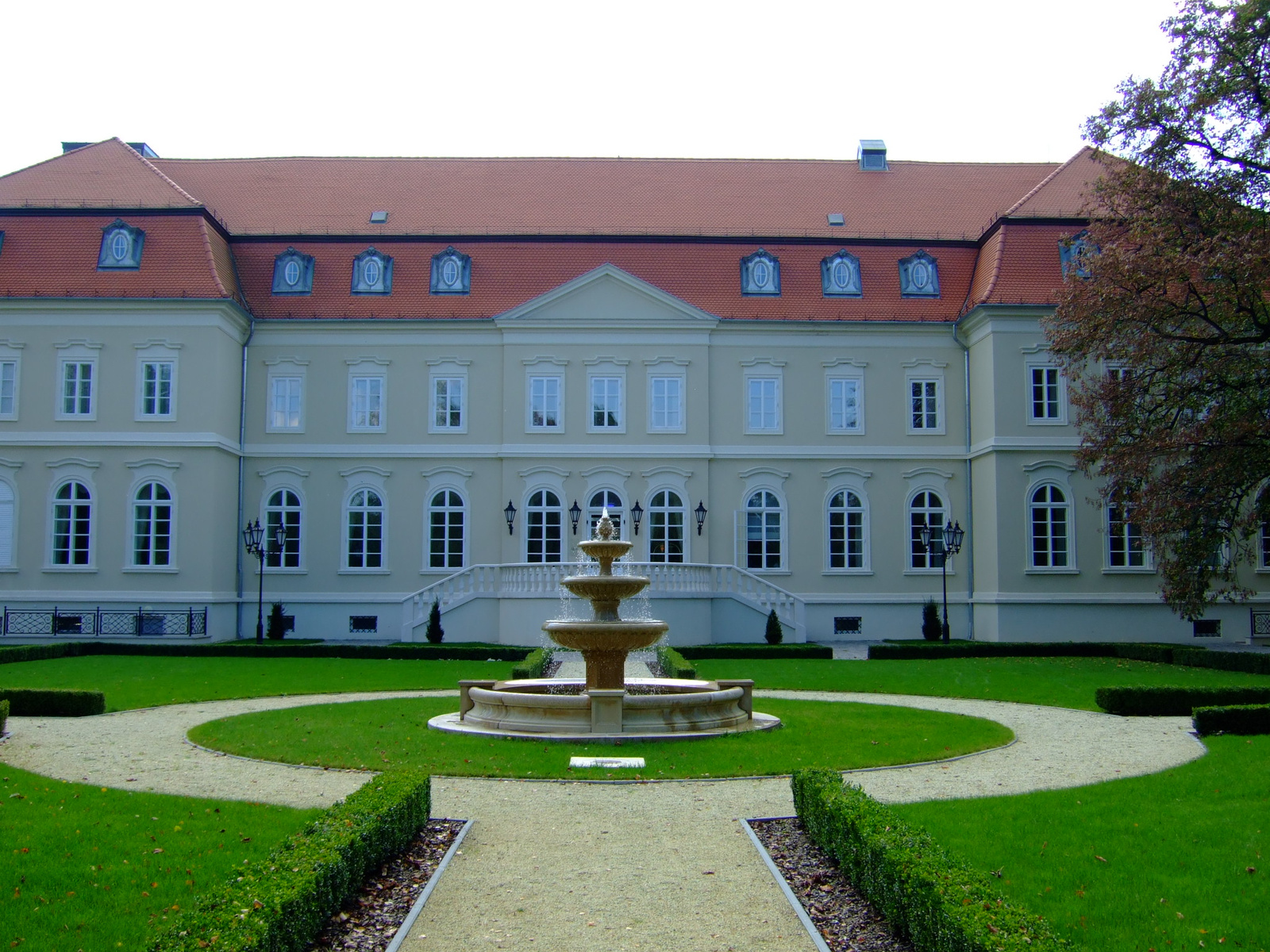
Erdődy-Pallavicini Mansion in Szilvásvárad

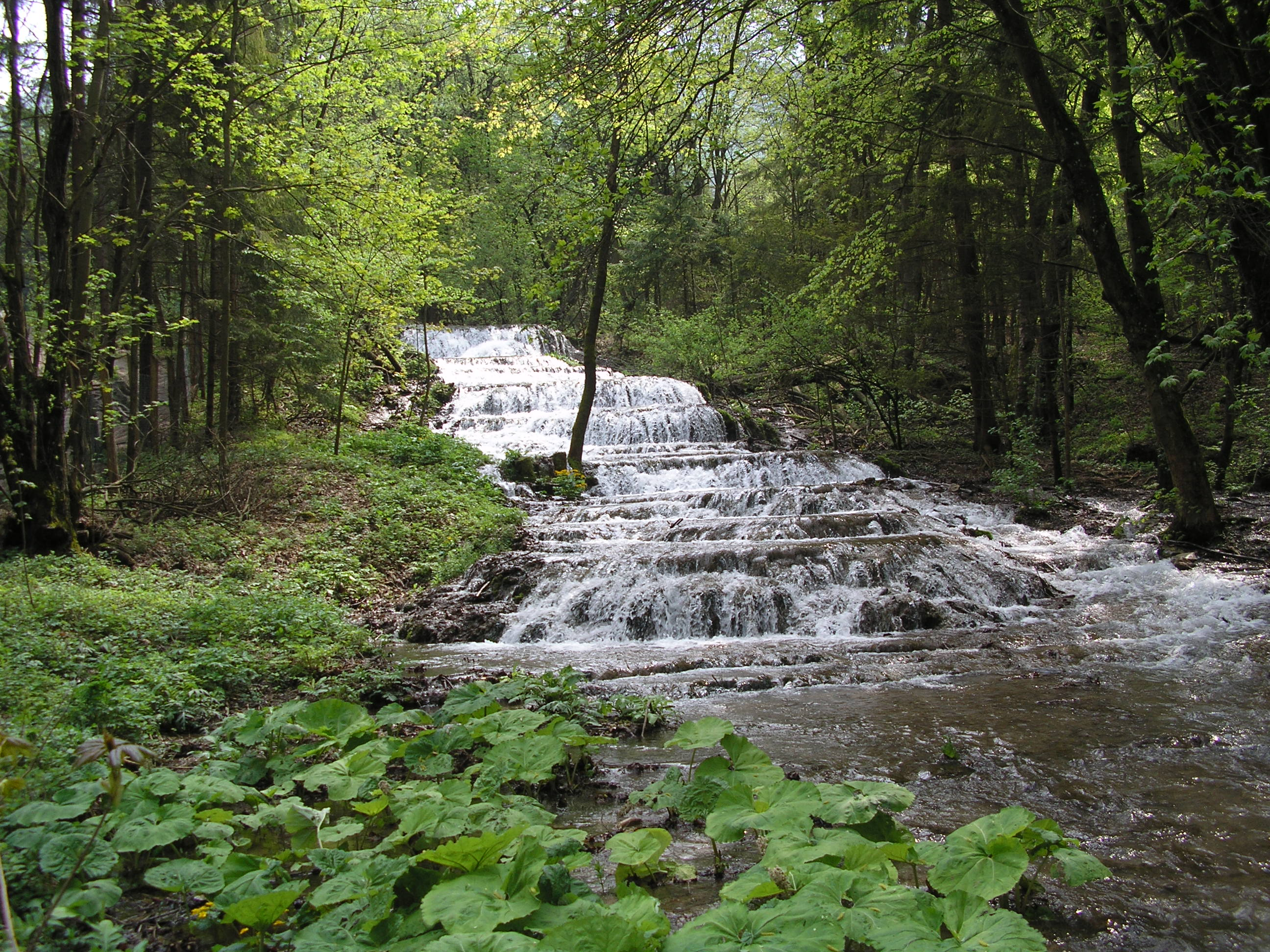
Waterfall in Szalajka Valley

== See also ==
- List of cities and towns of Hungary
