= Mikófalva =

- Village (község)
- Coat of arms

- Location of Heves County in Hungary

- Location in Hungary
- Coordinates: 48°03′18″N 20°19′12″E
- Country: Hungary
- Region: Northern Hungary
- County: Heves County
- District: Bélapátfalva

Government
  - Mayor: Fónagy Gergely (Ind.)

Area
  - Total: 14.41 km^{2} (5.56 sq mi)

Population (2015)
  - Total: 698
  - Density: 48.4/km^{2} (125/sq mi)
- Time zone: UTC+1 (CET)
  - Summer (DST): UTC+2 (CEST)
- Postal code: 3344
- Area code: 36
- Website: http://www.mikofalva.hu/

Mikófalva is a village in Heves County, Hungary.
