= Bánkút (Nagyvisnyó) =

Coordinates: 48.0989°N 20.4889°E

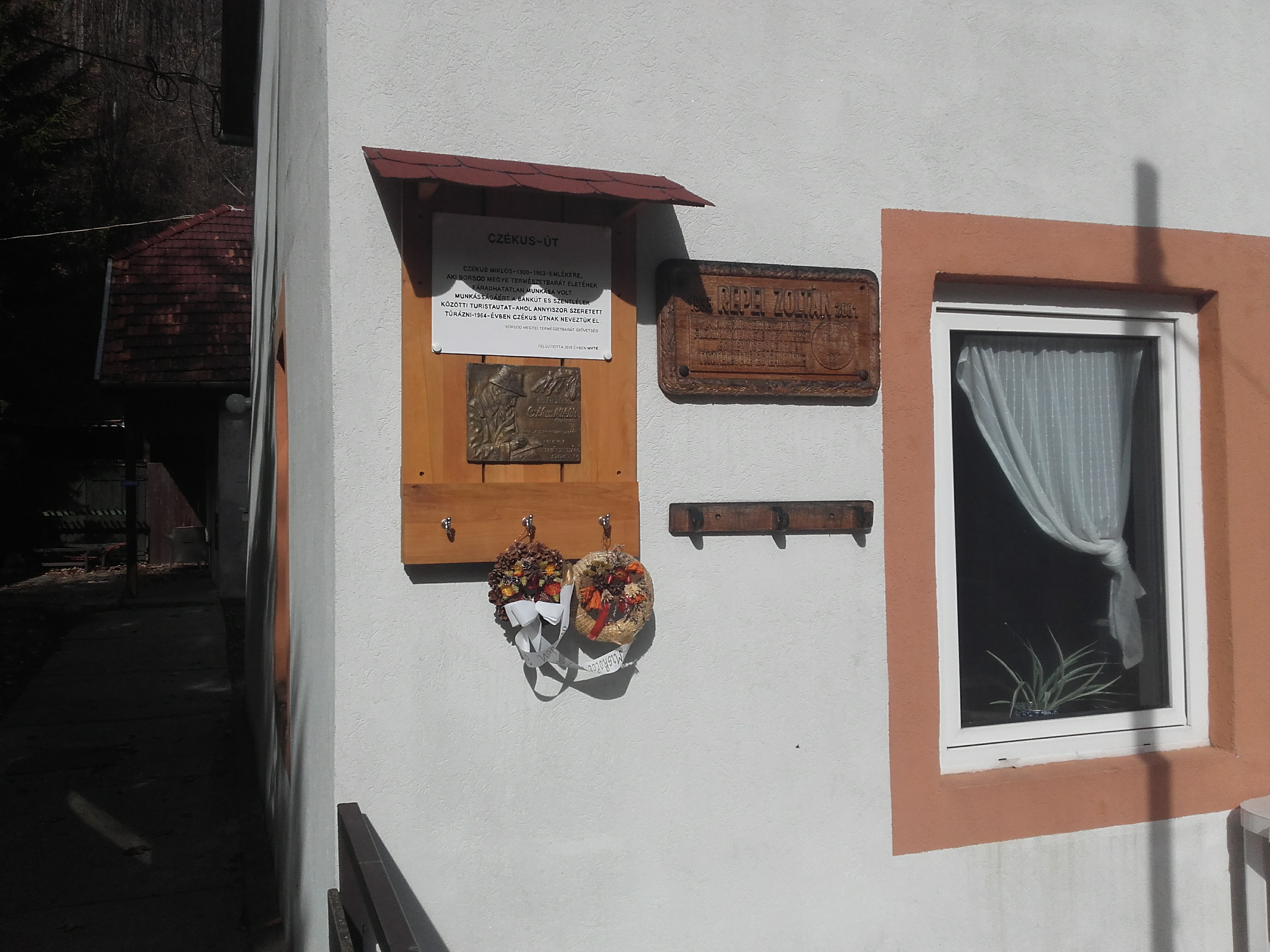
Bánkút

Bánkút is a ski resort in Northern Hungary in the Bükk National Park. It lies 32 km west from Miskolc and 800–930 metres above sea level; officially belongs to the village of Nagyvisnyó.

It has six ski trails of various difficulty and two beginner slopes, its eight ski lifts can lift 2000 persons per hour. There are two cross-country ski trails, 3.5 km and 8 km long. In ski season MVK Zrt., the public transport company of Miskolc operates a bus line between the city's Diósgyőr district and Bánkút.

There are three cross country ski courses - 3.5, 5 and 8 kilometres long.
