= Nagyvisnyó =

- Village (község)
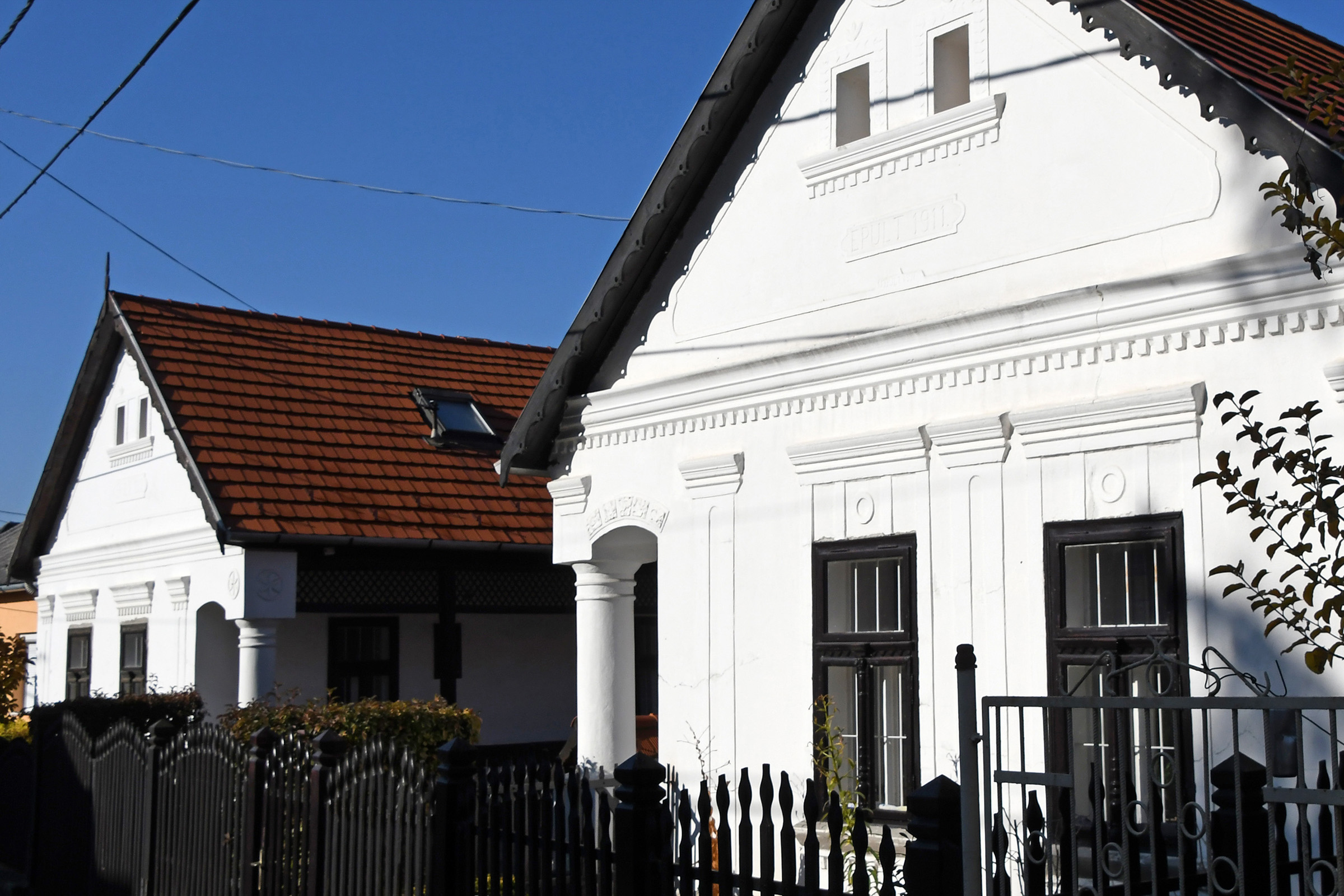
- Traditional houses in Nagyvisnyó

- Coat of arms
- Interactive map of Nagyvisnyó
- Coordinates: 47°55′26″N 20°02′3″E
- Country: Hungary
- County: Heves
- District: Bélapátfalva

Area
  - Total: 43.02 km^{2} (16.61 sq mi)

Population (2015)
  - Total: 913
  - Density: 21.2/km^{2} (55.0/sq mi)
- Time zone: UTC+1 (CET)
  - Summer (DST): UTC+2 (CEST)
- Postal code: 3349
- Area code: +36 36
- Website: www.nagyvisnyo.hu

Nagyvisnyó is a village and municipality in northern Hungary, in Heves county, northwest of the Bükk Mountains, in the valley of Bán-patak. Until 1950, the village was part of Borsod county.

Popular ski resort Bánkút is situated within municipality limits.

== Monuments ==
The Baroque Protestant church was built around 1800; its cassetted ceiling was made in 1804.
