= Mónosbél =

- Municipality
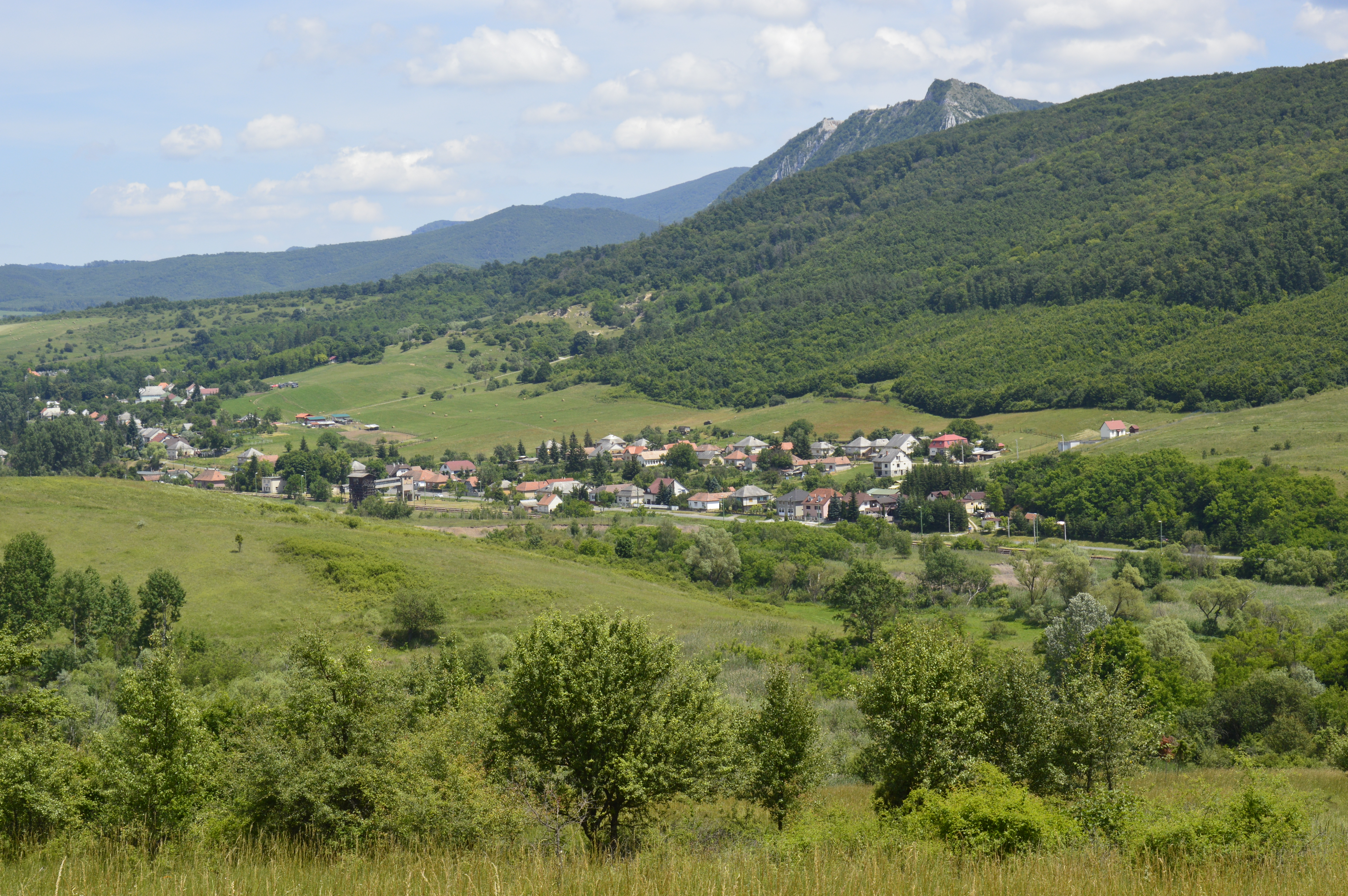

- Coat of arms

- Location in Hungary
- Coordinates: 48.035°N 20.334°E
- Country: Hungary
- Region: Northern Hungary
- County: Heves
- Subregion: Bélapátfalva

Area
  - Total: 14.24 km^{2} (5.50 sq mi)

Population (2015)
  - Total: 358
  - Density: 25.1/km^{2} (65.1/sq mi)
- Time zone: UTC+1 (CET)
  - Summer (DST): UTC+2 (CEST)
- Postal code: 3345
- Area code: 36

Mónosbél is a village and municipality (Hungarian: község) in Heves County, Hungary.
