= Coat of arms of Miskolc =

The coat of arms, adopted in 1909

The coat of arms of Miskolc, Hungary was created in 1909 based on the mediaeval seals of the city.

The first print of the seal was found in a 1376 document by Arnoldus, the judge of the town. The document was a decree by the town council approving a will concerning a vineyard on St. George Hill (the mediaeval name for Avas). The seal is almost completely undistinguishable on this document.

The next print can be found on a document dated 7 July 1389, in yellow sealing wax. Its legend is unreadable, and disputes arose about the identity of its heraldic figure, a king's head with a fleur-de-lis crown – according to one theory it is St. Stephen, the patron saint of the Avas church, but the fleur-de-lis indicates a king of the Angevin dynasty, possibly Louis the Great, who gave Miskolc town rights.

The next version is from a document from 1433, found in the archives of the Bárczay family. This seal, also affixed in yellow sealing wax, featured a bearded king, possibly Sigismund of Luxemburg, and the legend was Sigillum Civitas Miskolcz ("Seal of the city of Miskolc"). On the left side of the king's head there is a crescent moon, on the right side there is a six-pointed star. In 1577, during the Ottoman occupation the judge, Gergely Tejfeles lost the seal, and a new one was made, this also featured the number 1577 next to the king's head. This seal was in use until 1610.

Between 1633 and 1687 the print seal was changed to the figure of St. Stephen holding a sceptre and an orb in his hands. After 1687 the figure was changed again, to that of a saint, with a wheat stalk and a bunch of grapes in his hands.

In 1909, when Miskolc was granted municipal rights, and became independent from Borsod county, its coat of arms was created from elements of the previous seals.

During the second half of the Communist era of Hungary a different coat of arms was used, it was adopted in 1965 and featured a metalworker's figure, reflecting the city's importance in heavy industry, and the head of King Louis, separated by four wavy lines representing the river Sajó and the streams Szinva, Hejő and Pece.

In 1990 the old coat of arms from 1909 was re-adopted and it has been in use since then.

== Sources ==
- Béla Csanálossi: Miskolc – várostörténeti kalauz (Bíbor Kiadó, Miskolc, 2003) ISBN 963-9466-29-8
- The coat of arms on the official website of the city (Hungarian)
