= Mancs (dog) =

Hungarian rescue dog

- Species: Canis familiaris
- Breed: German Shepherd
- Sex: Male
- Born: 1994; Miskolc, Hungary
- Died: 22 October 2006 (aged 12); Miskolc, Hungary
- Nationality: Hungarian
- Occupation: Earthquake Search and Rescue
- Employer: Spider Special Rescue Team
- Known for: Saving lives after earthquakes worldwide
- Owner: László Lehoczki
- Named after: Hungarian word for "paw"
- Awards: Public statue erected in his honor in his hometown

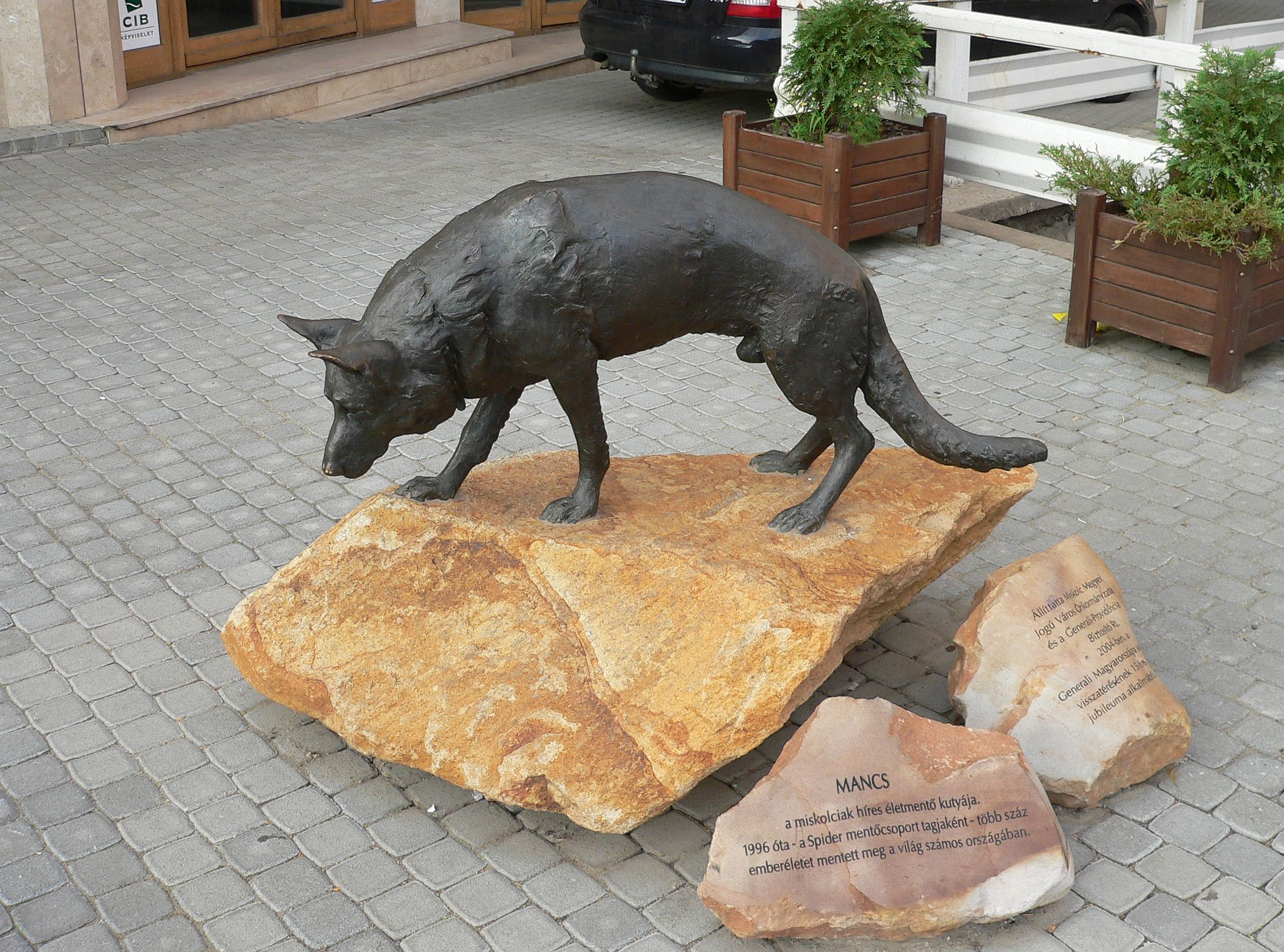
Statue of Mancs

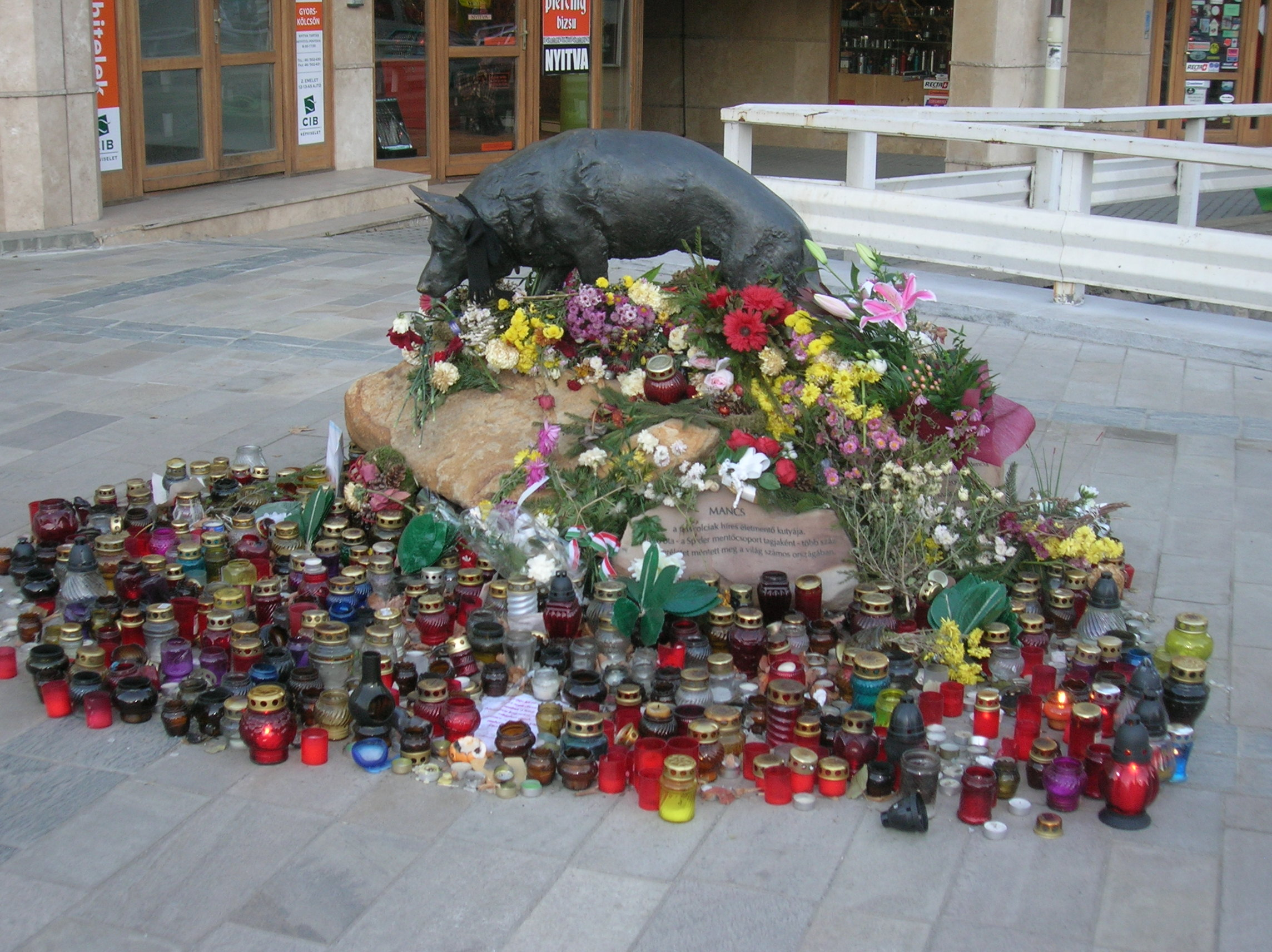
Remembering Mancs

Mancs (Hungarian: [mɒnt͡ʃ]; 1994–2006), a male German Shepherd Dog, was the most famous rescue dog of the Spider Special Rescue Team of Miskolc, Hungary. His name means "paw". Mancs' special talent was locating earthquake survivors who lay trapped deep beneath the rubble, and alerting rescuers. He could locate people buried under the earthquake rubble and not only differentiate whether the person was dead or alive, but could also indicate this to the other members of the rescue crew. If he sensed a dead person, he laid down; when he sensed a live person beneath the rubble, he stood up, wagged his tail and barked.

Mancs and his owner, László Lehoczki, took part in several earthquake rescue missions, including the 2001 earthquakes in El Salvador and India. Mancs became famous when he helped rescue a 3-year-old girl who spent 82 hours under the ruins after the Izmit earthquake of 1999 in Turkey.

In December 2004, a statue of Mancs was erected in downtown Miskolc, near the Szinva stream and the new public square. The statue was cast by sculptor Borbála Szanyi.

Mancs died on October 22, 2006, of pneumonia. In 2015, his rescue team was awarded the European Citizen's Prize for their 20 years of work in saving lives. Hatira Kaplan, the girl Mancs saved in 1999, attended the ceremony as a guest of honor and visited the statue of Mancs in Miskolc.

== Mancs in the media ==
In an article published in Dialectical Anthropology, Melinda Kovács discusses the press coverage of Mancs' world-wide rescue efforts as a notable example of Hungary's international assistance to other countries, particularly Turkey. Kovács writes:

Shortly before that time, Turkey was devastated by an earthquake, which was the reason for aid. In the media, the most visible personality associated with the aid and rescue efforts, repeatedly seen on TV talk-shows was Mancs, a German shepherd rescue dog. His most mediatized feat was finding a toddler under rubble. Several months after the quake, a Hungarian TV channel orchestrated a meeting between the dog and the little girl.

— Melinda Kovács, Bilateral Relations, Dialectical Anthropology 27, fn. 29

== Film ==
A feature film titled Mancs (released internationally as Paw) was released in late 2014, after several years of delay. The film, which alternates between live action and animation, was only loosely based on the life of Mancs. It was directed by Róbert Adrián Pejó and wasn't well received in Hungary; critics especially disliked that the film, aiming to be family friendly, downplayed tragic events such as earthquakes, and was set in a time period impossible to determine, with some scenes and elements reminding the viewer of the 1980s, some of them of the 1990s and some of the 2000s. In 2015 it won main prize at the Schlingel International Film Festival. The jury praised the animations and the family-friendly approach. The film was released in Germany with the title Mika – Dein Bester Freund ein grosser Held! ("Mika – Your Best Friend is a Great Hero").

== See also ==
- List of individual dogs

== Sources ==
- Spider Special Rescue Team
- Mancs in Turkey
- Article mentioning Mancs in the Budapest Sun
- Mancs at his new statue (a short article in Hungarian with photo)
