= Miskolc Plaza =

Coordinates: 48.1064°N 20.7889°E

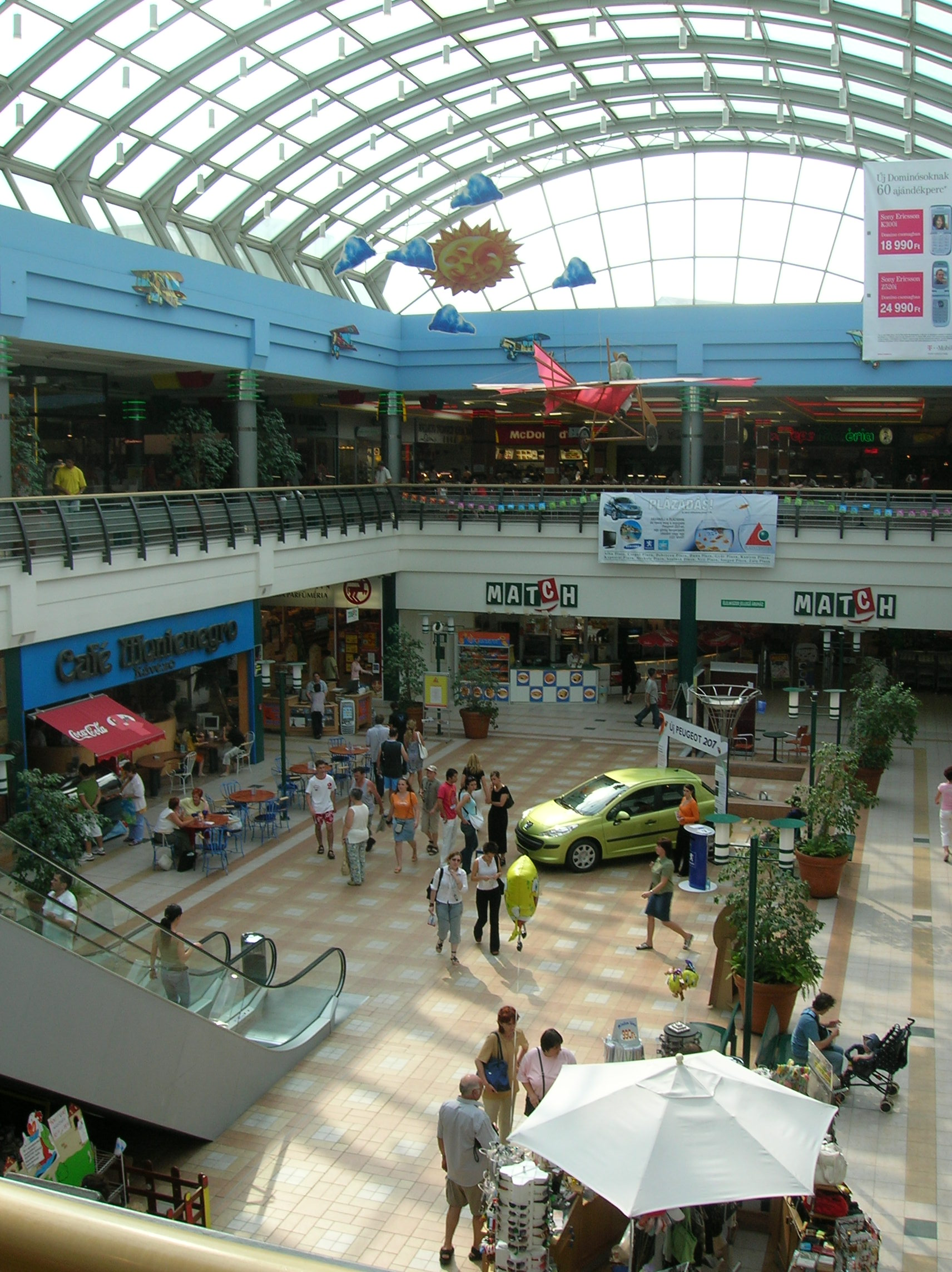
Miskolc Plaza

Miskolc Plaza is one of the two largest shopping malls of Miskolc, Hungary. It stands in the city centre, though, unlike its main rival, the Szinvapark mall, not on Széchenyi Street (the most important street in the city centre). Until Szinvapark was built, Miskolc Plaza was the only large shopping mall in Miskolc, and its cinema was the only multiplex cinema in the city.

Miskolc Plaza was built by Dutch-based Plaza Centers, as the 9th of its sixteen malls in Hungary. The shopping center was opened on June 13, 2000. Its full area is 35,351 m². The area rentable for businesses is 14,964 m² it hosts 103 businesses.

The mall complex consists of three buildings connected by bridges. Building A is a two-storey building, hosting most of the shops around a large central hall. Building B hosts the cinema and some smaller shops, its ground storey is occupied by a car park and five smaller shops opening to the street. Building C is a three-storey car park.

The car park accommodates 500 cars.

The mall had 8 million visitors in the first year after its opening.

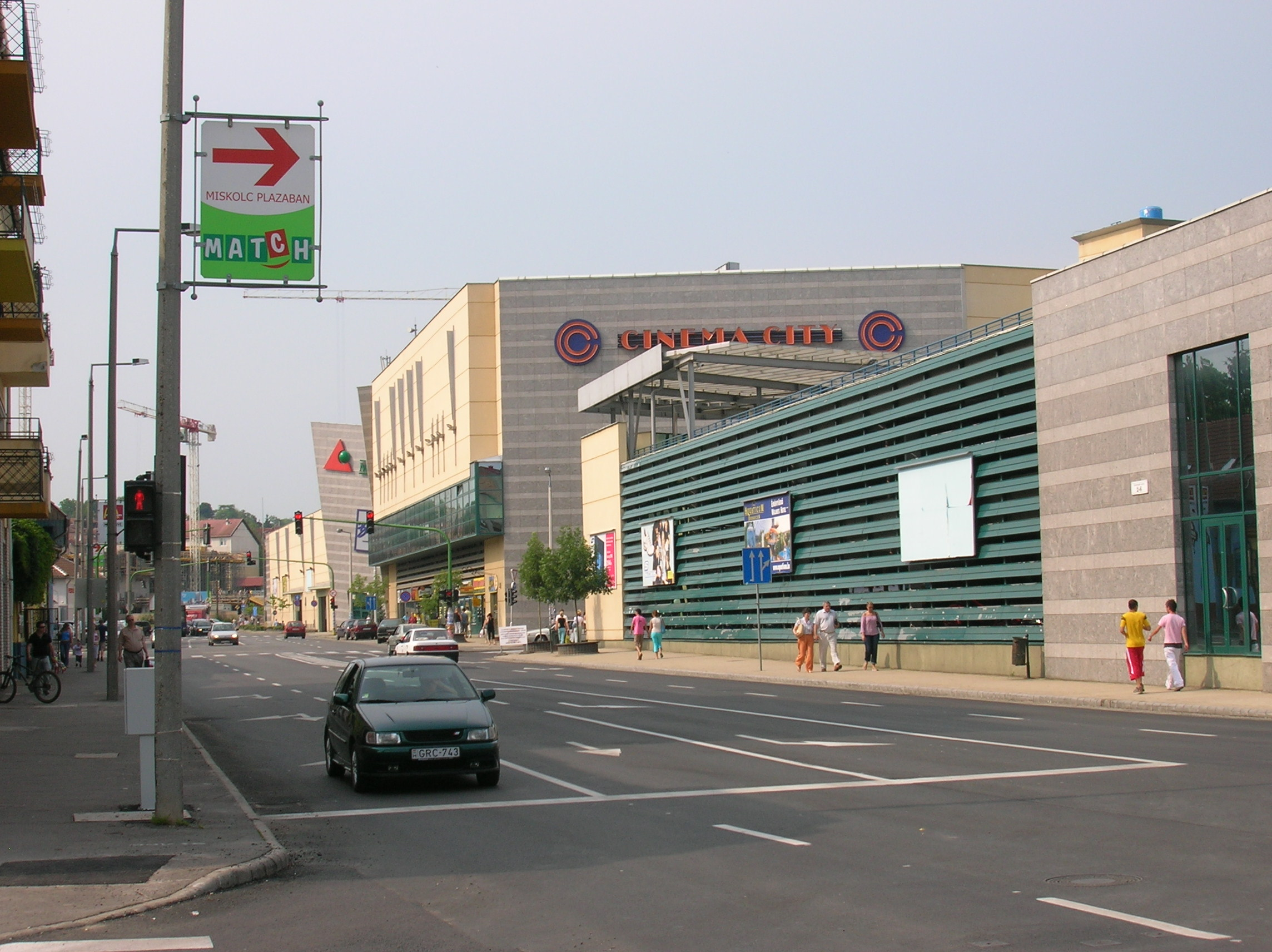
The building

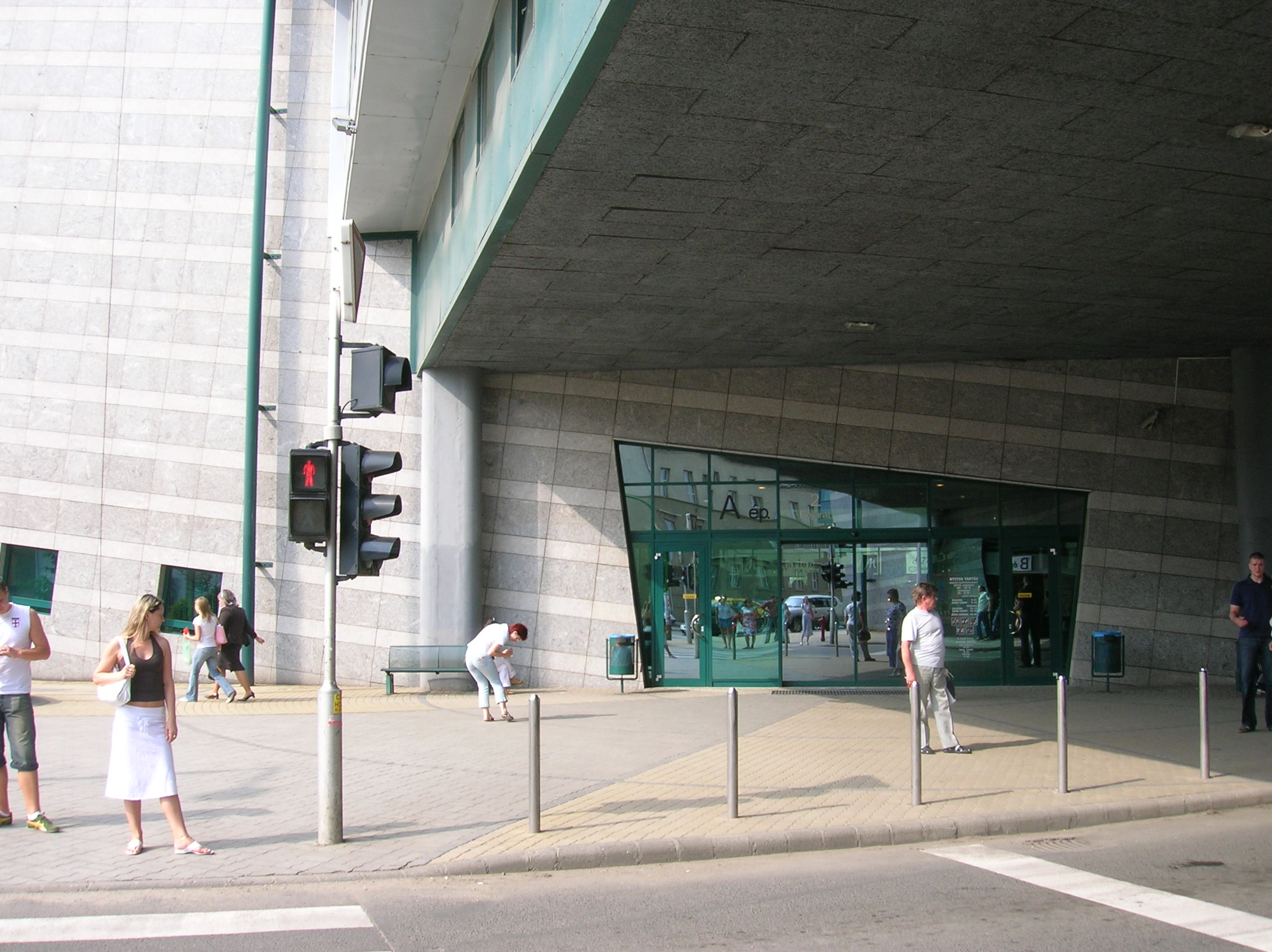
One of the entrances

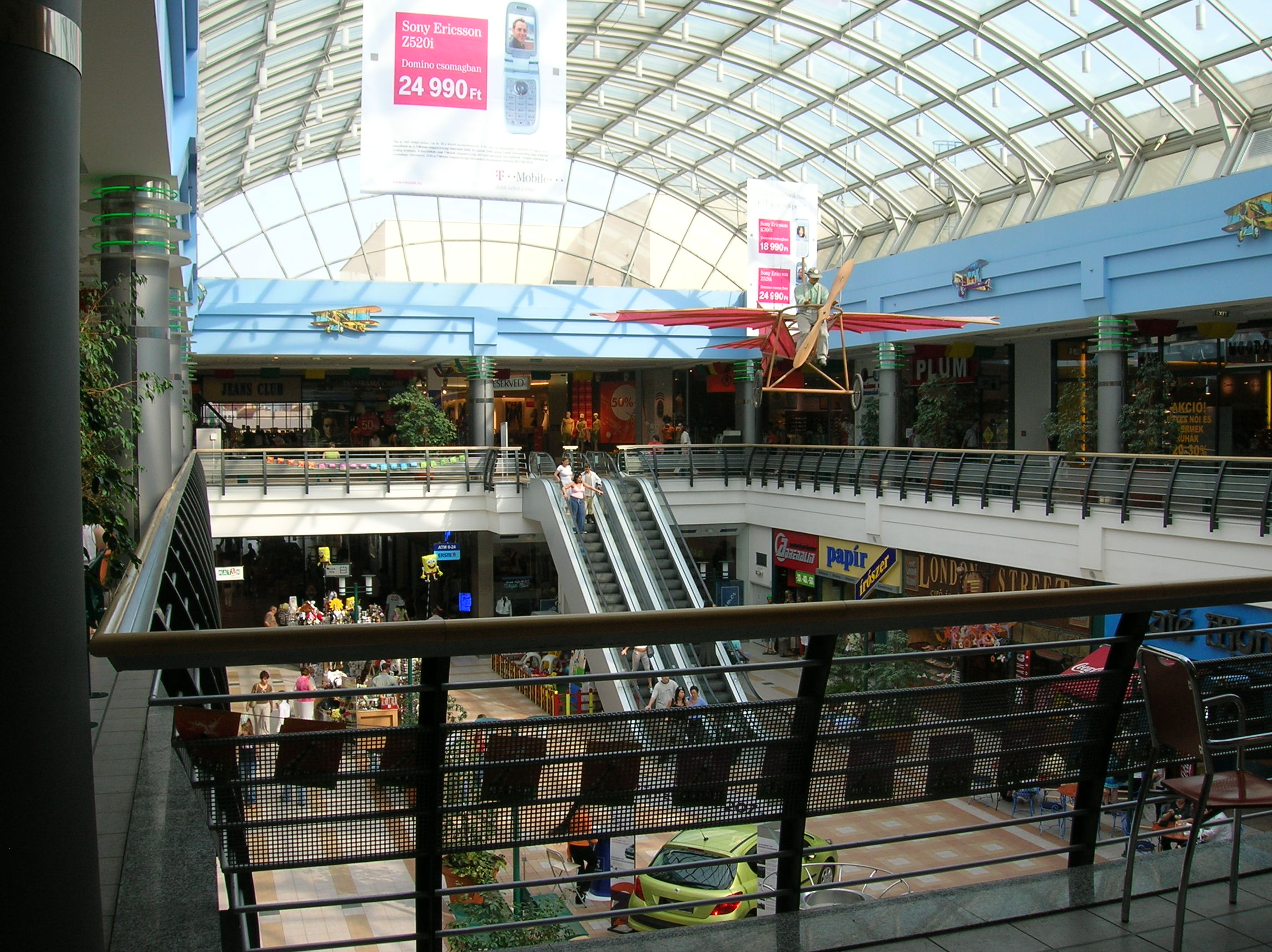
Inside

== Sources ==
- PlazaCenters.hu
