= László Lehoczki =

Hungarian civil defense rescuer (1958–2025)

- Born: 16 August 1958; Miskolc, Hungary
- Died: 27 November 2025 (aged 67)
- Occupation: Civil defense rescuer

László Lehoczki (16 August 1958 – 27 November 2025) was a Hungarian civil defense rescuer. He was best known for taking part along with his dog Mancs in numerous earthquake rescue missions such as the 1999 İzmit earthquake, and the 2001 earthquakes in El Salvador and India.

In 2024, he was awarded the Hungarian Golden Cross of Merit by President Tamás Sulyok.

Lehoczki died on 27 November 2025, at the age of 67.
