= Szinvapark =

Coordinates: 48.1024°N 20.7927°E

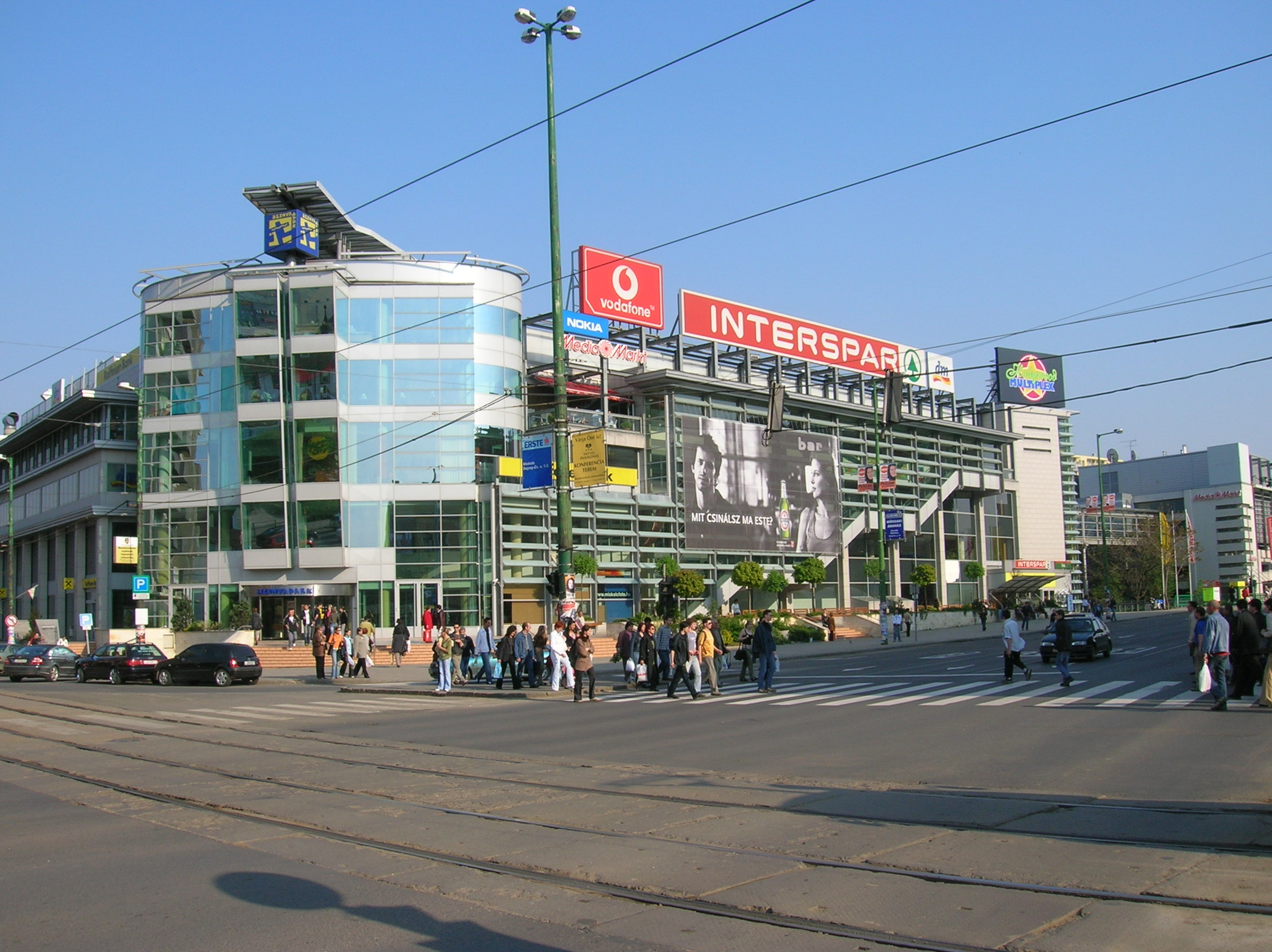
The mall

Szinvapark is one of the two largest shopping malls of Miskolc, Hungary. It is situated in the city centre, not far from its main rival, the Miskolc Plaza.

The three-storey shopping centre opened on September 1, 2000 and is visited by 20,000 customers daily. On its area of 31,000 m² it hosts 70 businesses including Media Markt, InterSpar and Raiffeisen Bank (Raiffeisen is also the owner of the mall complex). Hollywood Multiplex, the cinema of the mall was closed in 2007.

Szinvapark was designed by József Viszlai; the construction lasted 15 months. The mall was originally planned to be called Ady Bridge Center, since it stands right next to the Ady bridge. It got its current name after the stream Szinva which flows through the city. The Szinvapark complex consists of two buildings on the two banks of the stream Szinva, connected by a glass-walled bridge – the one on the left side houses most of the mall, including the supermarket and the cinema, while the other building is mainly a car park, with the Media Markt store occupying the uppermost storey.

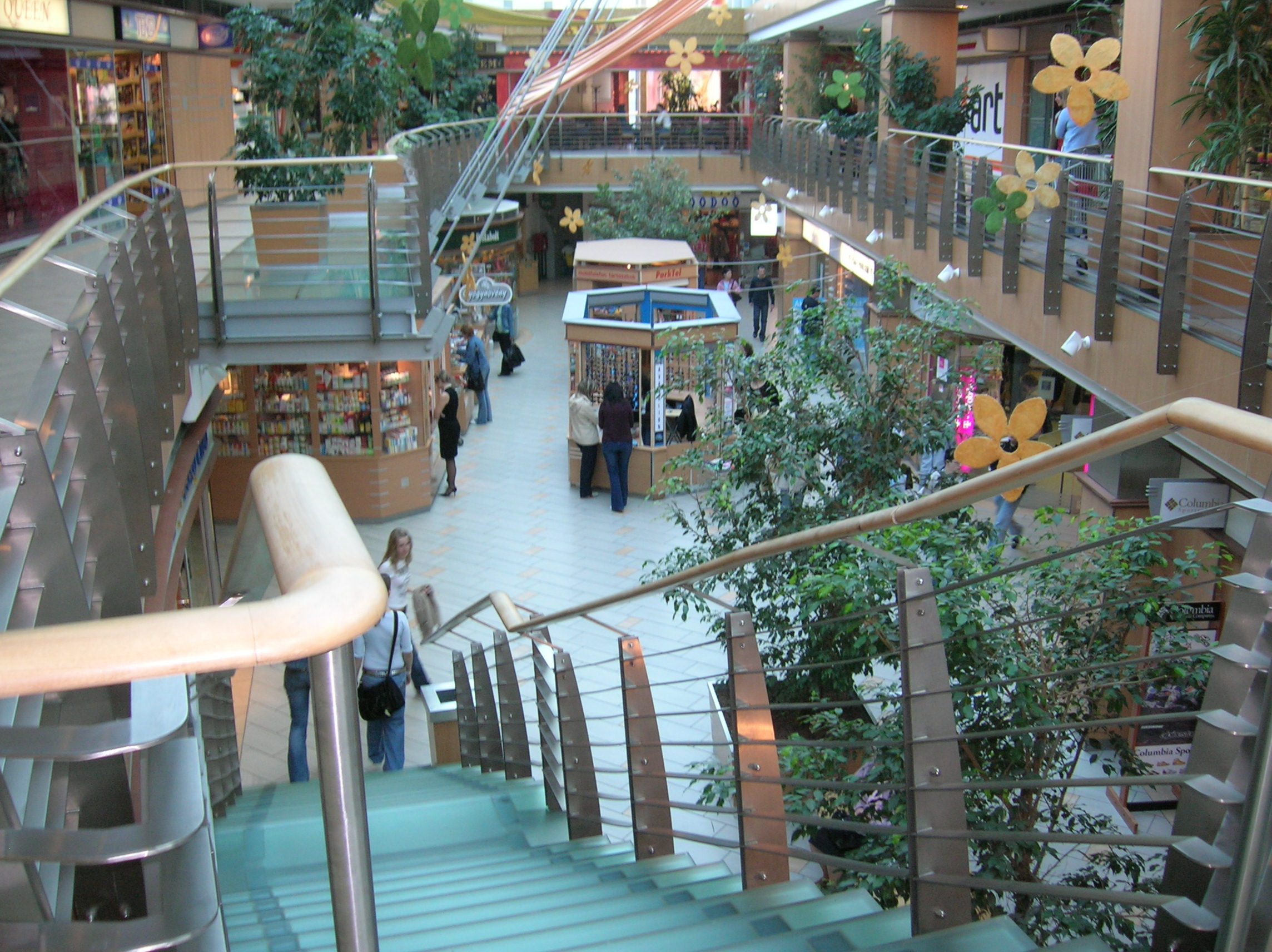

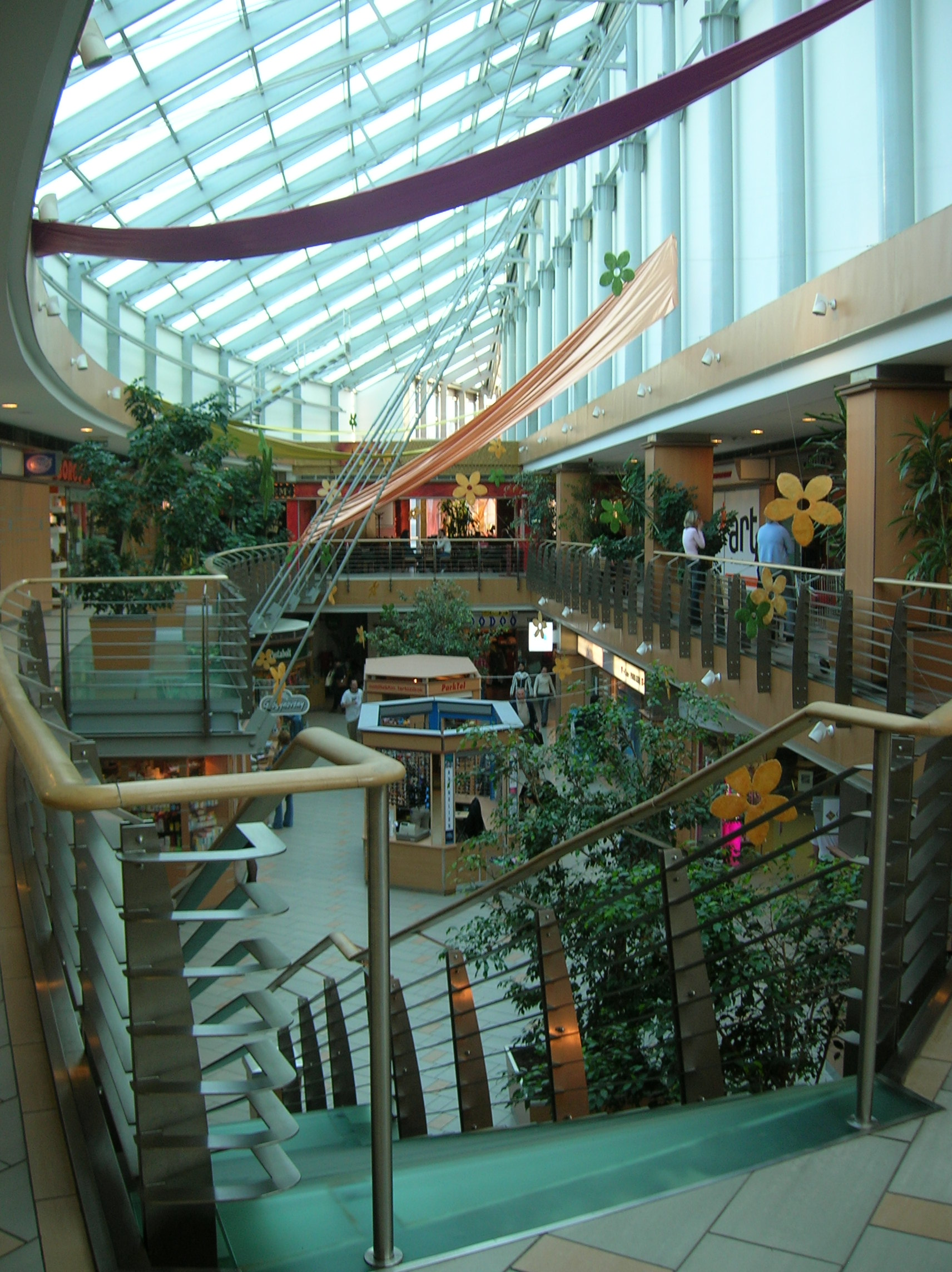

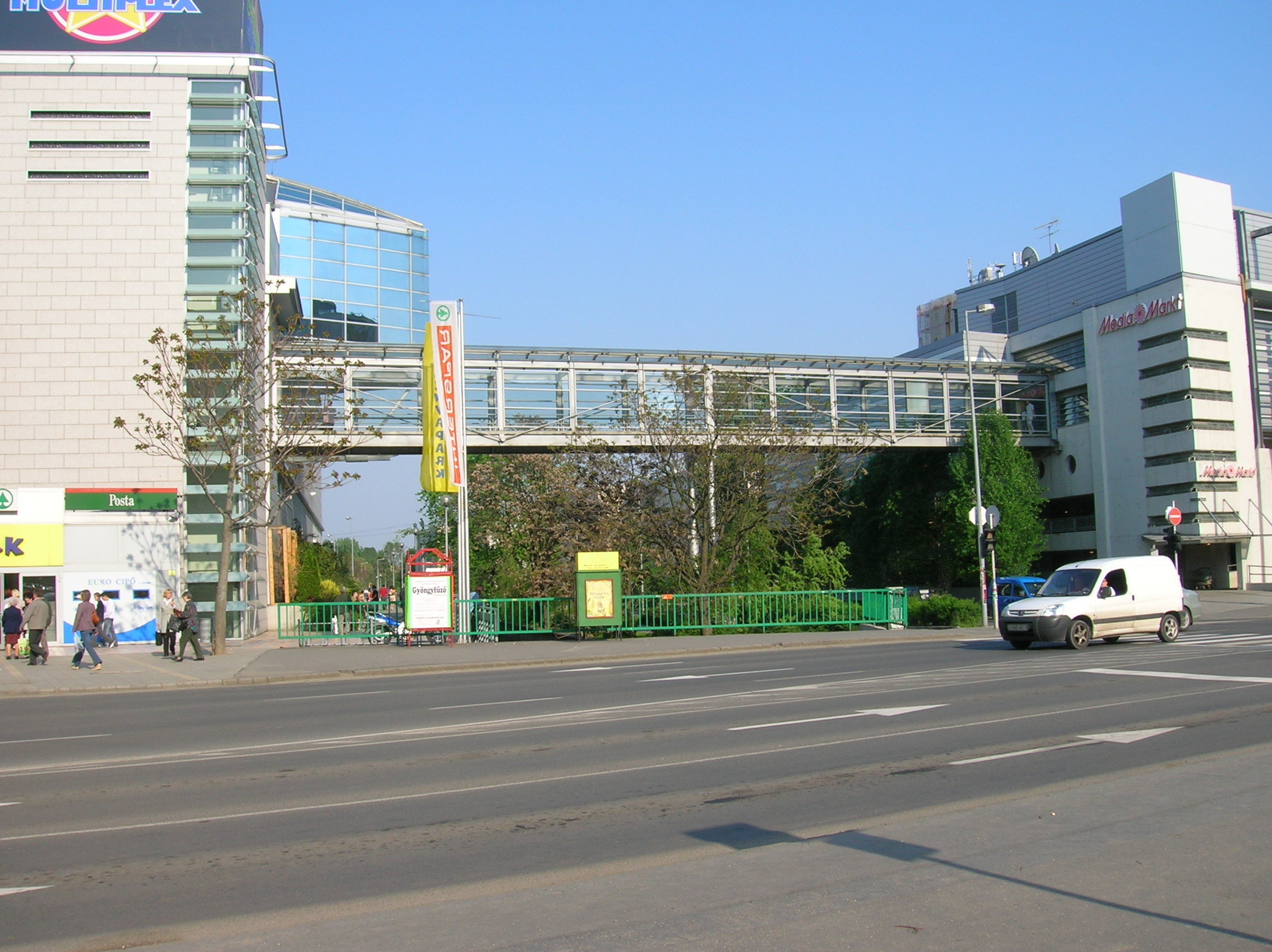

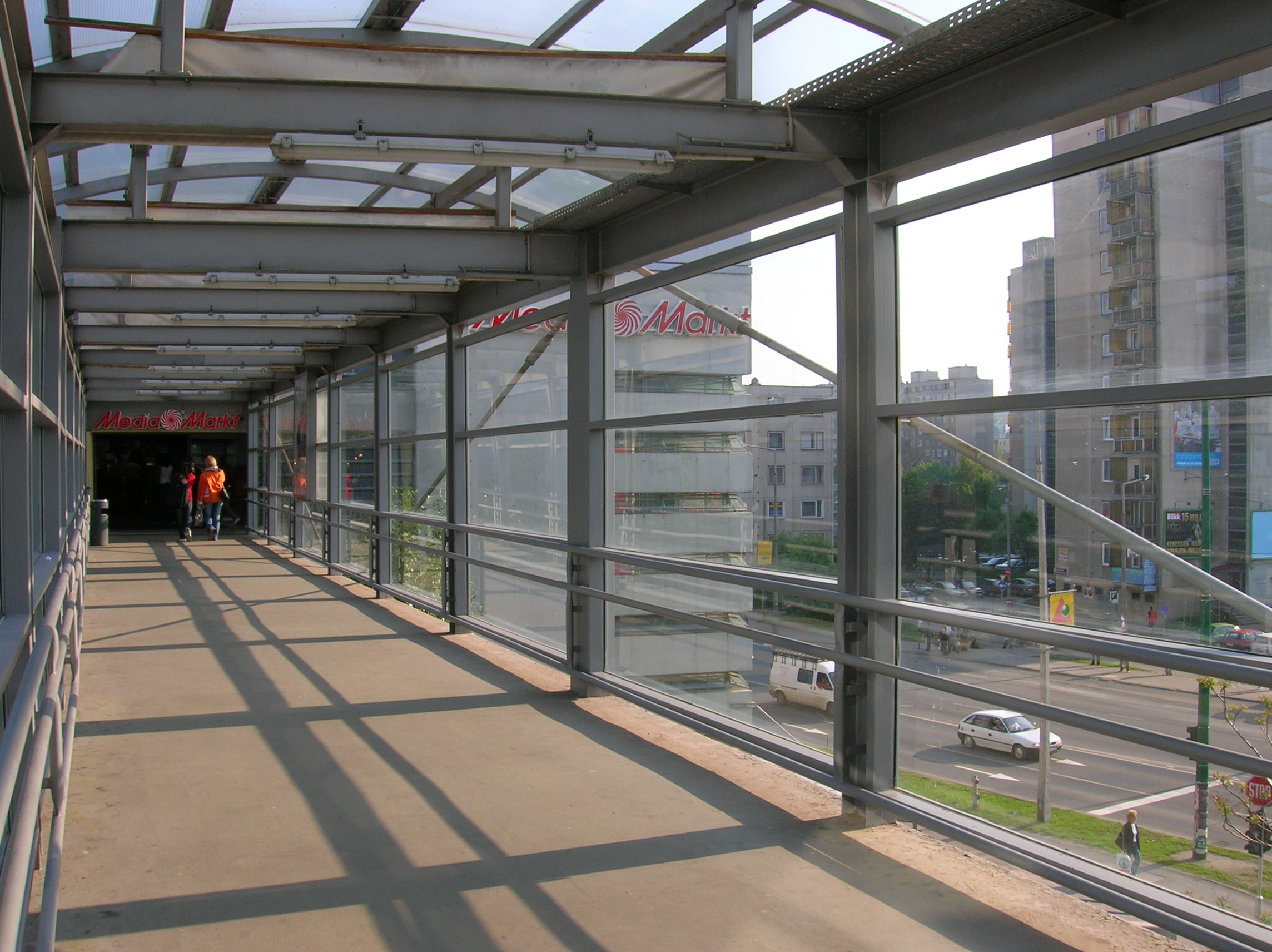
