= Szinva Terrace =

Public square in Miskolc, Hungary

Coordinates: 48.10202°N 20.784609°E

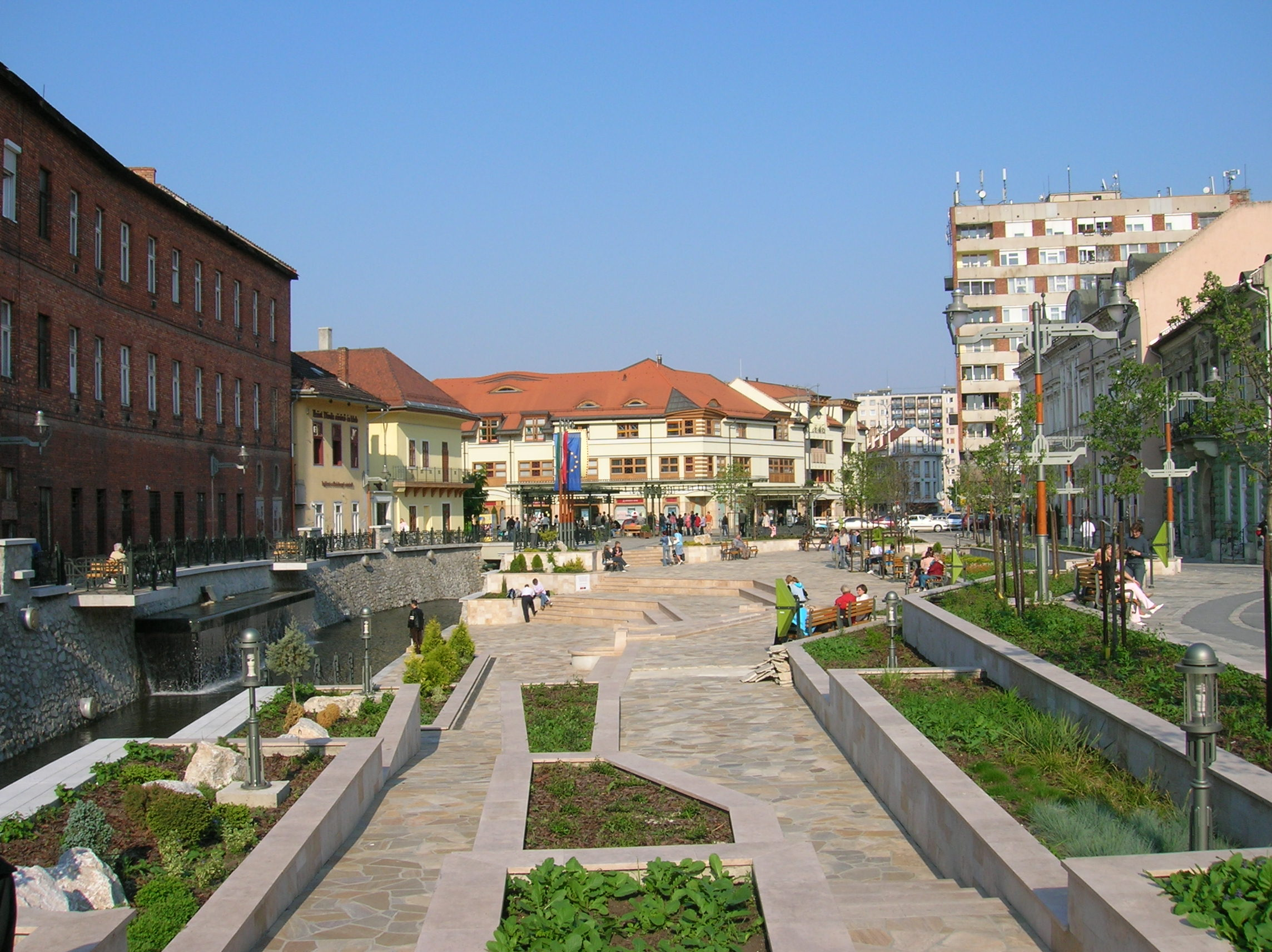
The Szinva Terrace

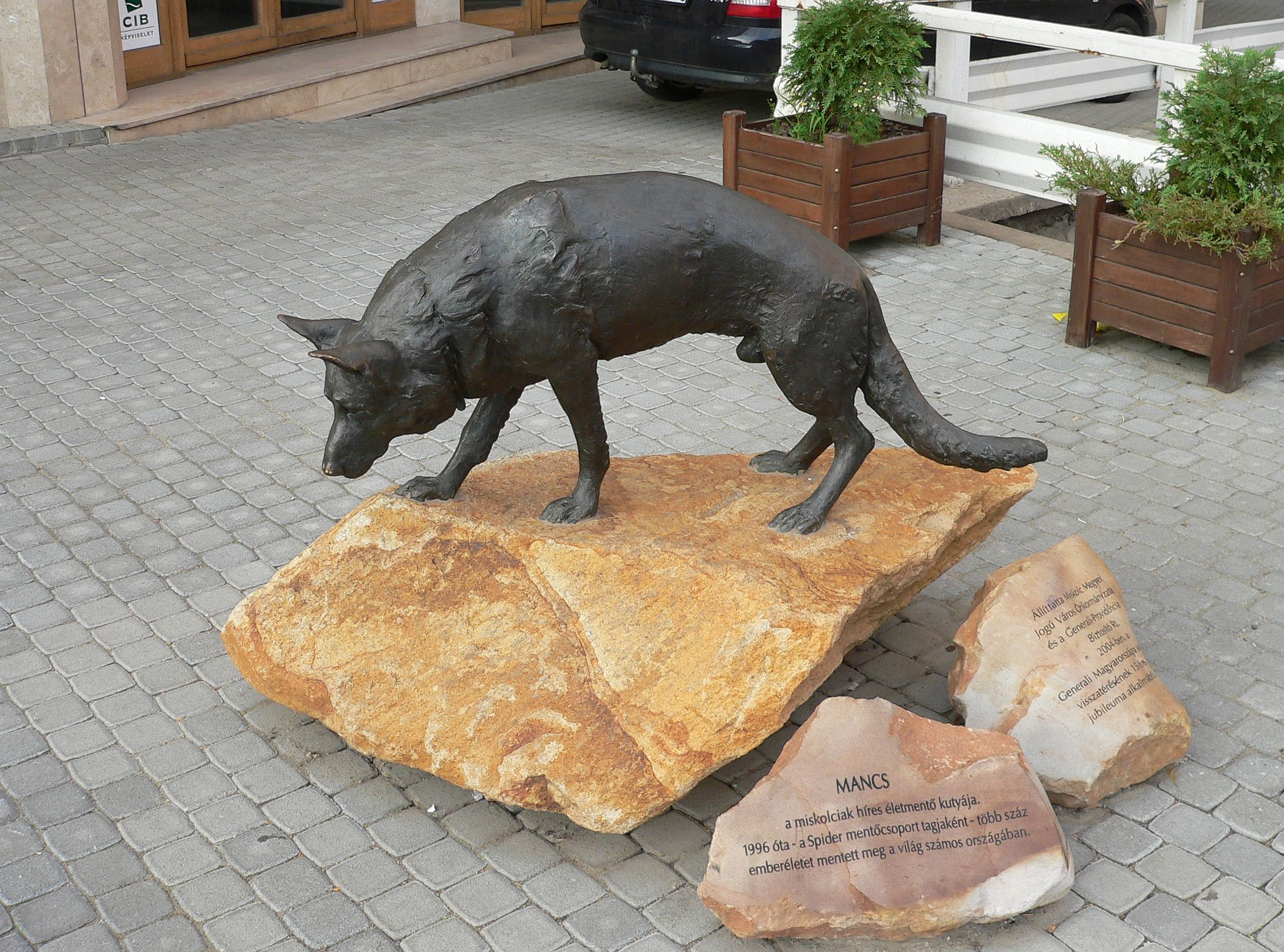
The sculpture of Mancs

The Szinva Terrace (Hungarian: Szinva terasz) is the newest public square in Miskolc city centre, Hungary, next to the stream Szinva which runs through the city.

The square was constructed in autumn 2005 in place of a parking lot, as a part of the reconstruction of the city centre, and was opened to the public on November 5. Construction cost 450 million Ft (mainly funded from European Union sources). The square consists of terraces and stairs leading down to the Szinva and a small artificial waterfall which is lit by lamps in the evenings.

The name of the square was chosen on December 8 by the city council from a list of eight suggested names including Szinva terrace, Szinva promenade, Kandia terrace, Szinva-side promenade, Port square, Szinva rest, Kandia rest, Széppataki square and Ostrava square.

The square has four flagpoles, three of which fly the flags of Miskolc, Hungary and the EU. A highlight of the square is the statue Girls of Miskolc, showing three young girls on a bench (made by sculptor László Kutas). Another statue nearby is that of Mancs, the famous rescue dog.

At the same time when the square was constructed, Kandia street (a nearby small pedestrian street which starts from the square and opens to Széchenyi street, opposite the National Theatre of Miskolc) was covered with a glass roof; this street (now called Kandia passage) now functions as an open-air exhibition place where drawings are often featured. Love padlocks recently appeared on the fence of a small bridge at the Western end of Szinva Terrace.

Heavy rains can make the stream flood the terraces. The number of flooded terraces grow in direct proportion with the intensity of the rain.
