= Szinva =

Stream in northern Hungary

Coordinates: 48°06′N 20°50′E

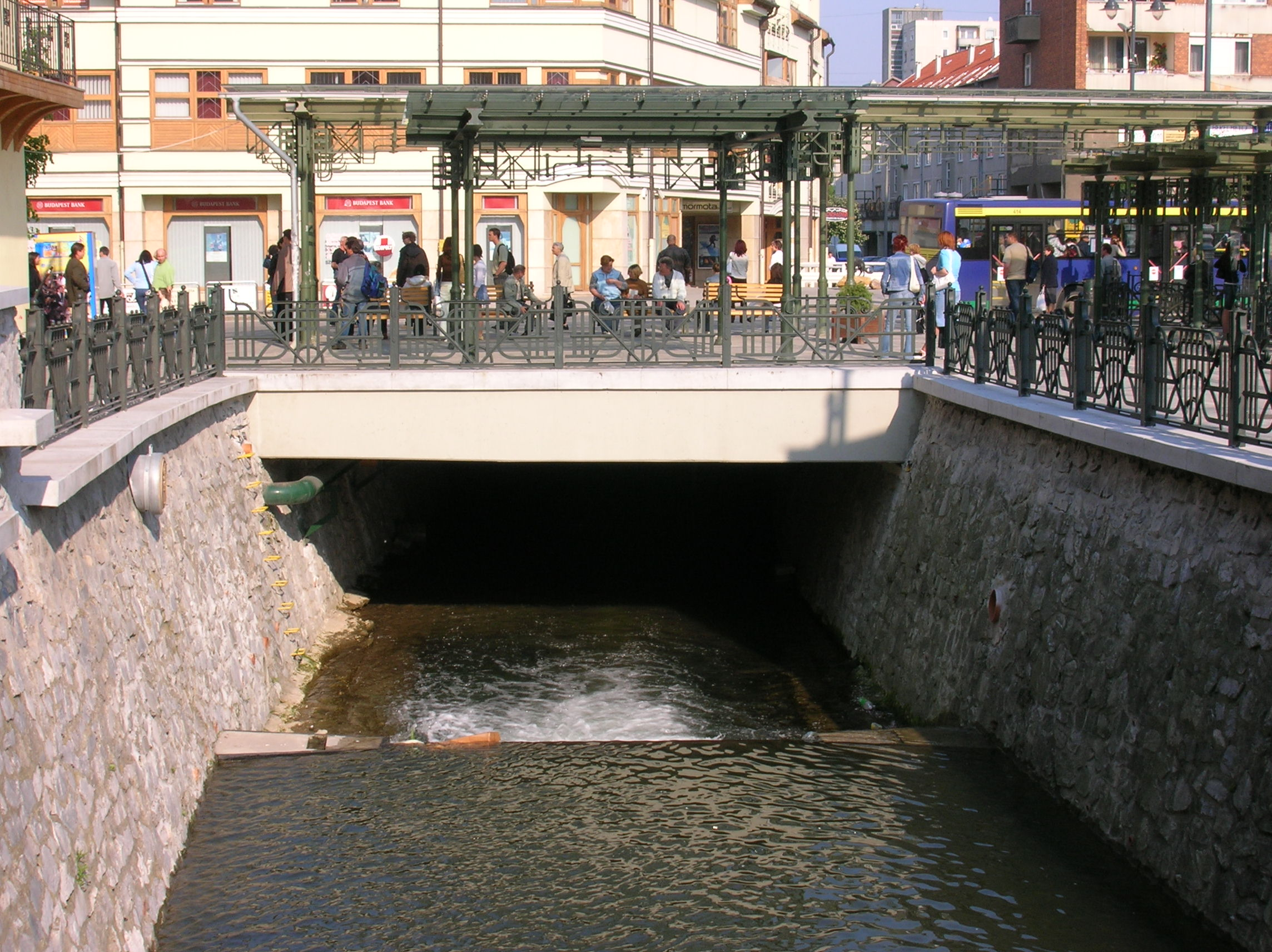
The stream.

Szinva is a stream in northern Hungary, a tributary to the river Slaná. It originates in the Bükk Mountains. It is 30 kilometres (19 mi) long, 20 kilometres (12 mi) of which can be found in the city of Miskolc, through which the stream flows from west to east. More than 70 bridges have been built over the stream, and it flows underground in parts of the city centre.

The damming of the streams Szinva and Garadna formed Lake Hámori in Miskolc-Lillafüred around 1770. The highest waterfalls of the country (20 metres high) can be found on the Szinva nearby. It is a major tourist attraction. Since the water of most of the water springs of the stream are fed into the water supply system of the city, and the upper reaches of the stream often run dry in summer, water has to be pumped from the lake for the waterfalls to work. Garadna flows into Szinva about 100 metres (330 ft) after the waterfall.

The Szinva was responsible for the great flood of 1878, one of the largest floods of the 19th century. The flood claimed about 400 lives and almost completely destroyed the downtown of Miskolc.

Before 1990, when Miskolc was a heavy industrial centre, the water of the stream was very polluted, mostly because of the paper factory of Diósgyőr. Today it is much cleaner, to the extent that some fish now live in it.

The Szinvapark shopping mall – one of the largest in Miskolc – was built on the two sides of the stream; the buildings are connected by a bridge over the Szinva. A newly constructed public square, the Szinva Terrace is also named after the stream.
