= Borsod-Abaúj-Zemplén County 4th constituency =

Hungarian national legislative constituency

Borsod-Abaúj-Zemplén County 4th constituency (Kazincbarcika)
- Constituency for the National Assembly
- Location of Borsod-Abaúj-Zemplén county 04 within Borsod-Abaúj-Zemplén county

- Location of Borsod-Abaúj-Zemplén county within Hungary
- County: Borsod-Abaúj-Zemplén
- Electorate: 74,214 (2022)
- Major settlements: Kazincbarcika

Current constituency
- Created: 2011
- Party: Tisza Party
- Member: Csaba Hatala-Orosz
- Elected: 2026

The 4th constituency of Borsod-Abaúj-Zemplén County (Hungarian: Borsod-Abaúj-Zemplén megyei 04. számú országgyűlési egyéni választókerület) is one of the single member constituencies of the National Assembly, the national legislature of Hungary. The constituency standard abbreviation: Borsod-Abaúj-Zemplén 04. OEVK.

Since 2026, it has been represented by Csaba Hatala-Orosz of the Tisza Party.

== Geography ==
The 4th constituency is located in northern part of Borsod-Abaúj-Zemplén County.

=== List of municipalities ===
The constituency includes the following municipalities:

1. Abaújlak
2. Abaújszolnok
3. Abod
4. Alacska
5. Alsógagy
6. Alsóvadász
7. Baktakék
8. Balajt
9. Bánhorváti
10. Berente
11. Beret
12. Boldva
13. Borsodszirák
14. Büttös
15. Csenyéte
16. Csobád
17. Damak
18. Debréte
19. Dédestapolcsány
20. Detek
21. Edelény
22. Fáj
23. Fancsal
24. Felsőgagy
25. Felsővadász
26. Forró
27. Gadna
28. Gagyapáti
29. Gagybátor
30. Gagyvendégi
31. Galvács
32. Hangács
33. Hegymeg
34. Hernádszentandrás
35. Homrogd
36. Ináncs
37. Irota
38. Izsófalva
39. Kány
40. Kazincbarcika
41. Kázsmárk
42. Keresztéte
43. Kiskinizs
44. Kondó
45. Krasznokvajda
46. Kupa
47. Ládbesenyő
48. Lak
49. Léh
50. Litka
51. Mályinka
52. Meszes
53. Monaj
54. Múcsony
55. Nagybarca
56. Nyésta
57. Nyomár
58. Pamlény
59. Perecse
60. Rakaca
61. Rakacaszend
62. Rásonysápberencs
63. Rudolftelep
64. Sajóecseg
65. Sajóivánka
66. Sajókápolna
67. Sajópálfala
68. Sajósenye
69. Sajószentpéter
70. Sajóvámos
71. Selyeb
72. Szakácsi
73. Szászfa
74. Szendrőlád
75. Szuhakálló
76. Tardona
77. Tomor
78. Tornabarakony
79. Tornaszentjakab
80. Vadna
81. Viszló
82. Ziliz

== Members ==
The constituency was first represented by Zoltán Demeter of the Fidesz from 2014, and he was re-elected in 2018 and 2022. In the 2026 election, Csaba Hatala-Orosz of the Tisza Party was elected representative.

Election	Member	Party	%	Ref.
2014	Zoltán Demeter	Fidesz	37.14	
2018	Zoltán Demeter	Fidesz	44.72	
2022	Zoltán Demeter	Fidesz	54.39	
2026	Csaba Hatala-Orosz	Tisza Party	53.95	
