= Szikszó District =

Coordinates: 48.3000°N 20.9667°E

Szikszó District Szikszói járás
- Districts of Hungary
- Coat of arms

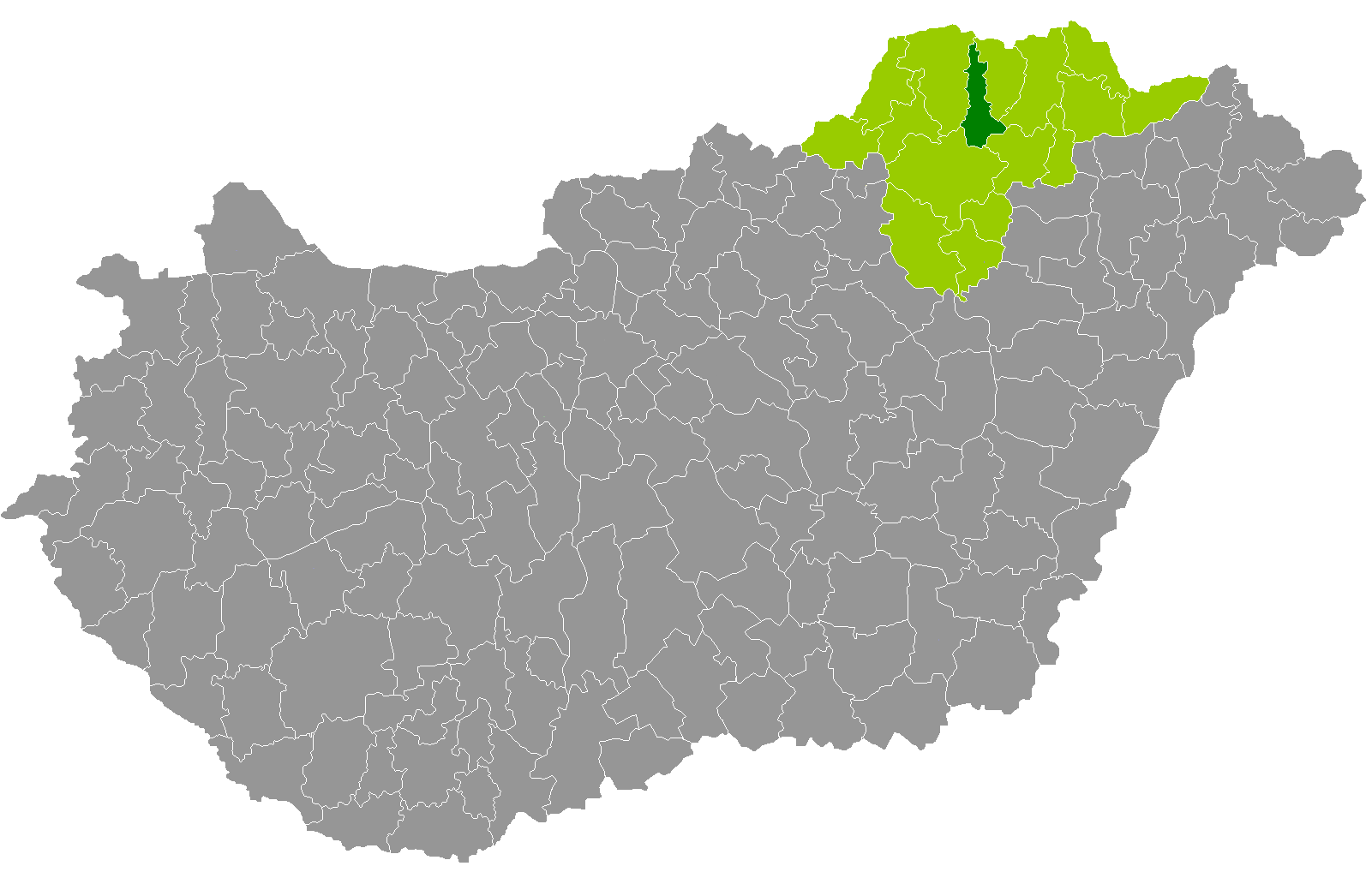
- Szikszó District within Hungary and Borsod-Abaúj-Zemplén County.
- Country: Hungary
- County: Borsod-Abaúj-Zemplén
- District seat: Szikszó

Area
  - Total: 309.25 km^{2} (119.40 sq mi)
  - Rank: 14th in Borsod-Abaúj-Zemplén

Population (2011 census)
  - Total: 17,507
  - Rank: 13th in Borsod-Abaúj-Zemplén
  - Density: 57/km^{2} (150/sq mi)

Szikszó (Hungarian: Szikszói járás) is a district in central-northern part of Borsod-Abaúj-Zemplén County. Szikszó is also the name of the town where the district seat is found. The district is located in the Northern Hungary Statistical Region.

== Geography ==
Szikszó District borders with Encs District northeast, Szerencs District to the southeast, Miskolc District to the southwest, Edelény District to the west. The number of the inhabited places in Szikszó District is 24.

== Municipalities ==
The district has 1 town and 23 villages. (ordered by population, as of 1 January 2012)

- Abaújlak (131)
- Abaújszolnok (191)
- Alsóvadász (1,562)
- Aszaló (1,879)
- Felsővadász (543)
- Gadna (262)
- Gagybátor (226)
- Gagyvendégi (200)
- Halmaj (1,853)
- Hernádkércs (275)
- Homrogd (956)
- Kázsmárk (959)
- Kiskinizs (359)
- Kupa (159)
- Léh (473)
- Monaj (223)
- Nagykinizs (333)
- Nyésta (52)
- Pamlény (44)
- Rásonysápberencs (595)
- Selyeb (489)
- Szászfa (119)
- Szentistvánbaksa (270)
- **Szikszó** (5,348) – district seat

The bolded municipality is the city.

== Demographics ==
Religion in Szikszó District (2011 census)
1. Catholic Church (39.9%)
2. Greek Catholicism (14.4%)
3. Calvinism (24.3%)
4. Lutheranism (0.30%)
5. Other religions (0.60%)
6. Non-religious (4.20%)
7. Atheists (0.30%)
8. Undeclared (16.0%)

In 2011, it had a population of 17,507 and the population density was 57/km².

Year	County population	Change
2011	17,507	n/a

=== Ethnicity ===
Besides the Hungarian majority, the main minorities are the Roma (approx. 3,500) and Rusyn (100).

Total population (2011 census): 17,507
Ethnic groups (2011 census): Identified themselves: 20,043 persons:

- Hungarians: 16,316 (81.40%)
- Gypsies: 3,434 (17.13%)
- Others and indefinable: 293 (1.46%)

Approx. 2,500 persons in Szikszó District did declare more than one ethnic group at the 2011 census.

=== Religion ===
Religious adherence in the county according to 2011 census:

- Catholic – 9,511 (Roman Catholic – 6,979; Greek Catholic – 2,529);
- Reformed – 4,254;
- Evangelical – 46;
- other religions – 112;
- Non-religious – 733;
- Atheism – 44;
- Undeclared – 2,807.

== Gallery ==
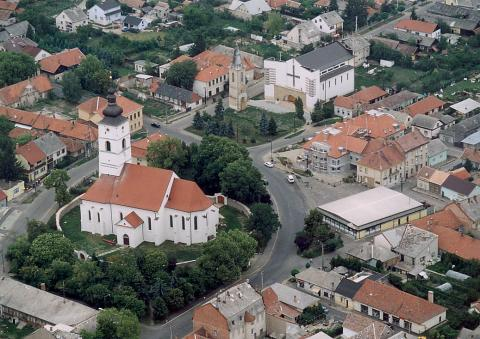
Szikszó, the district seat

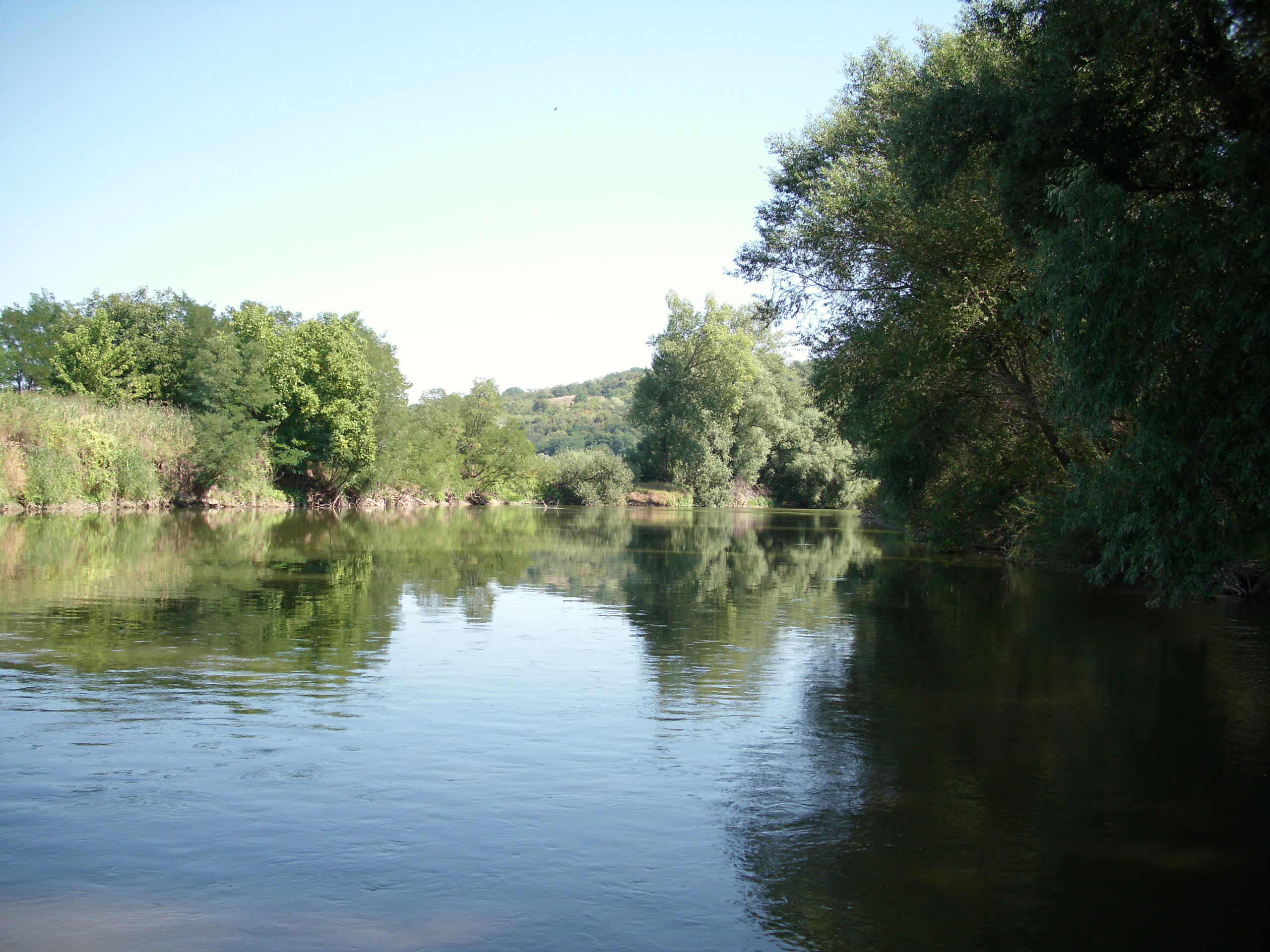
Hernád river near Szentistvánbaksa

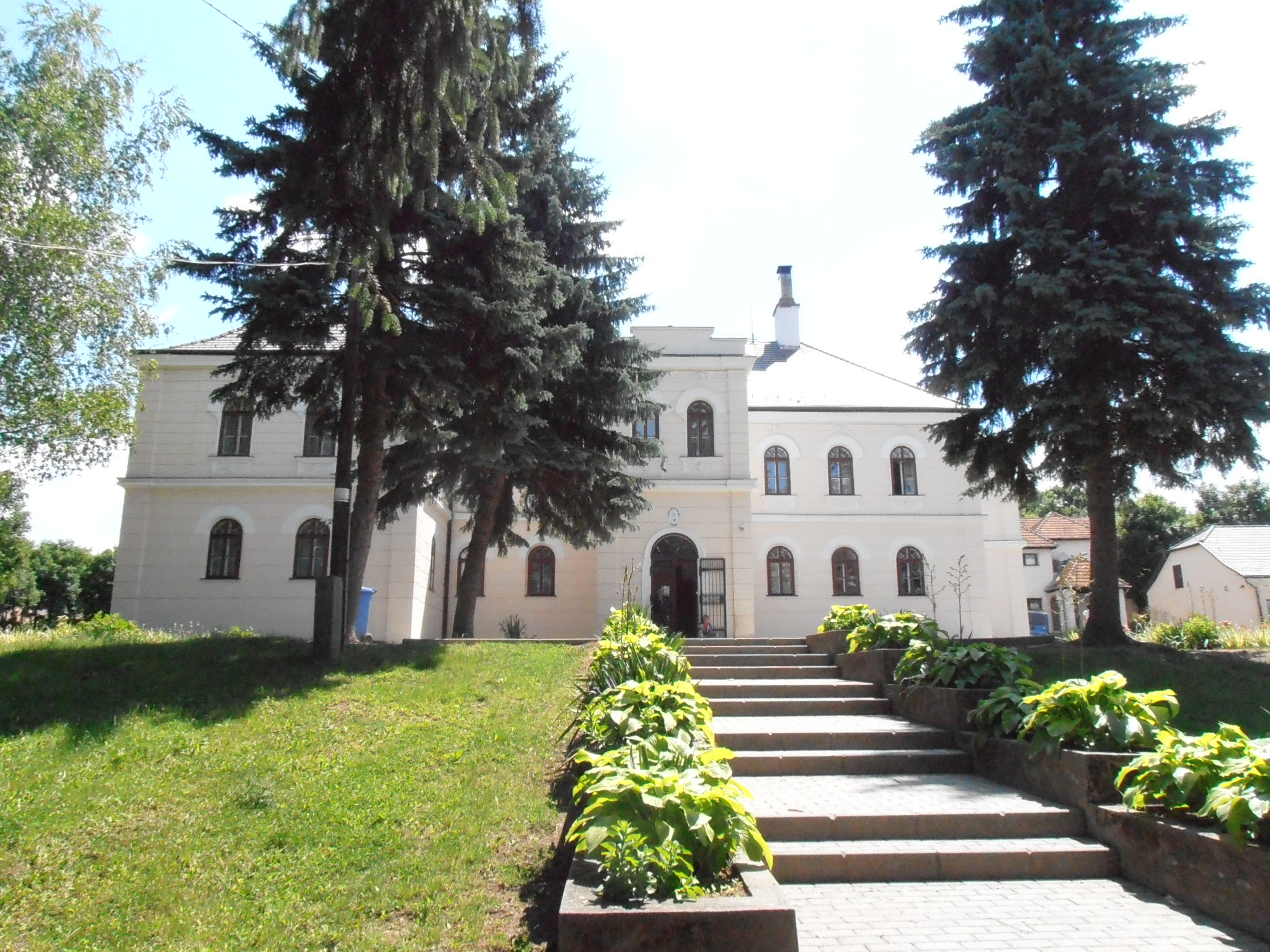
Rákóczi Mansion in Felsővadász

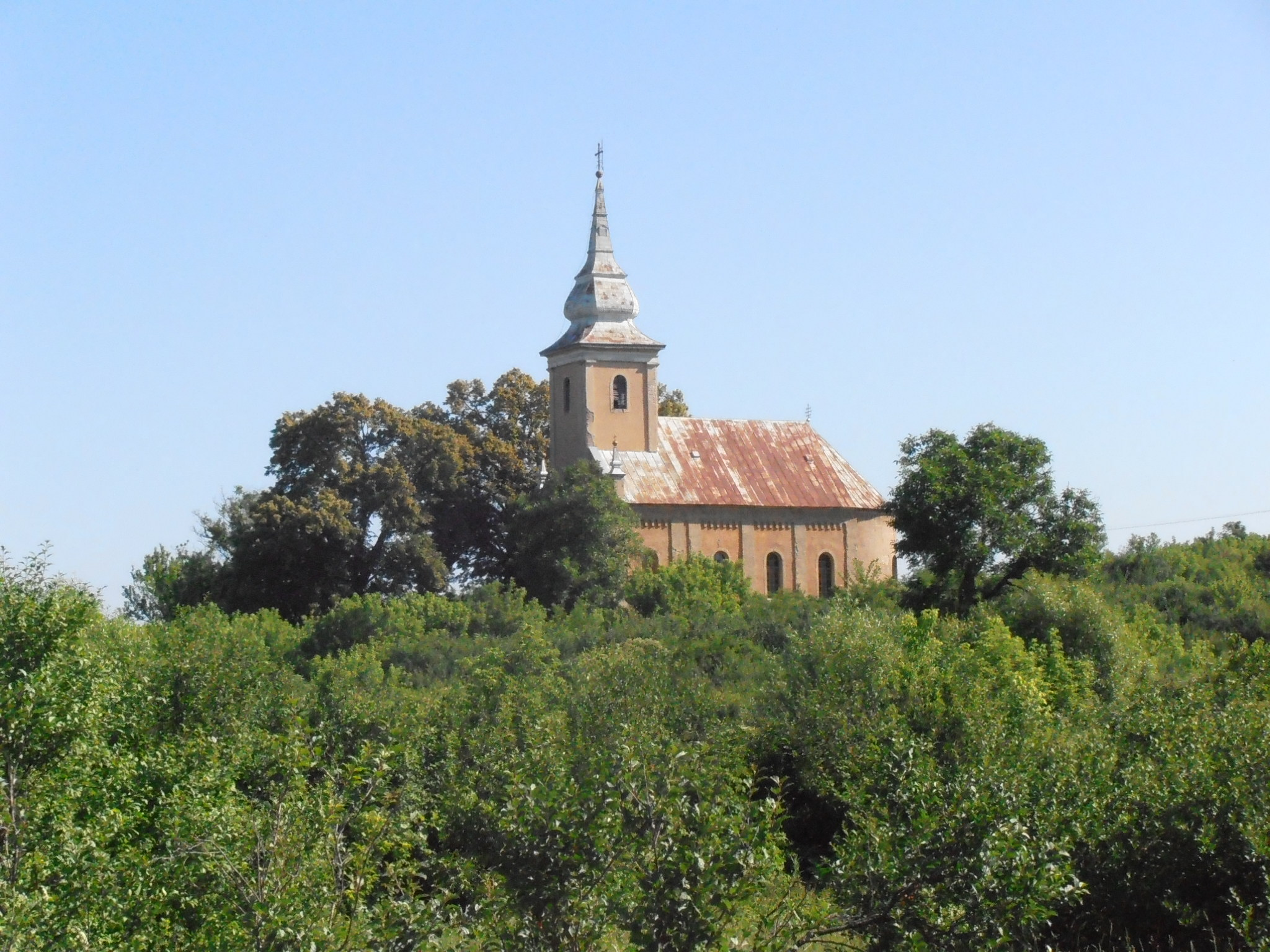
Greek Catholic Church in Abaújszolnok

== See also ==
- List of cities and towns of Hungary
