= List of populated places in Hungary (G) =

This is a list of cities, towns and villages of Hungary

KEY: T = Town ; V = Village

Name	Rank	County	District	Population	Post code
Gáborján	V	Hajdú-Bihar	Berettyóújfalui	927	4122
Gáborjánháza	V	Zala	Lenti	79	8969
Gacsály	V	Szabolcs-Szatmár-Bereg	Fehérgyarmati	889	4972
Gadács	V	Somogy	Kaposvári	118	7276
Gadány	V	Somogy	Marcali	347	8716
Gadna	V	Borsod-Abaúj-Zemplén	Szikszói	263	3815
Gádoros	V	Békés	Orosházi	4,084	5932
Gagyapáti	V	Borsod-Abaúj-Zemplén	Encsi	15	3837
Gagybátor	V	Borsod-Abaúj-Zemplén	Szikszói	296	3817
Gagyvendégi	V	Borsod-Abaúj-Zemplén	Szikszói	201	3816
Galambok	V	Zala	Nagykanizsai	1,279	8754
Galgaguta	V	Nógrád	Balassagyarmati	723	2686
Galgagyörk	V	Pest	Váci	1,113	2681
Galgahévíz	V	Pest	Aszódi	2,542	2193
Galgamácsa	V	Pest	Veresegyházi	1,971	2183
Gálosfa	V	Somogy	Kaposvári	309	7473
Galvács	V	Borsod-Abaúj-Zemplén	Edelényi	112	3752
Gamás	V	Somogy	Fonyódi	857	8685
Ganna	V	Veszprém	Pápai	297	8597
Gánt	V	Fejér	Bicskei	849	8082
Gara	V	Bács-Kiskun	Bajai	2,653	6522
Garáb	V	Nógrád	Pásztói	77	3067
Garabonc	V	Zala	Nagykanizsai	795	8747
Garadna	V	Borsod-Abaúj-Zemplén	Encsi	492	3873
Garbolc	V	Szabolcs-Szatmár-Bereg	Fehérgyarmati	135	4976
Gárdony	T	Fejér	Gárdonyi	8,005	2483
Garé	V	Baranya	Siklósi	356	7812
Gasztony	V	Vas	Szentgotthárdi	487	9952
Gátér	V	Bács-Kiskun	Kiskunfélegyházi	1,035	6111
Gávavencsello	V	Szabolcs-Szatmár-Bereg	Ibrány–Nagyhalászi	3,938	4472
Géberjén	V	Szabolcs-Szatmár-Bereg	Mátészalkai	574	4754
Gecse	V	Veszprém	Pápai	488	8543
Géderlak	V	Bács-Kiskun	Kalocsai	1,097	6334
Gégény	V	Szabolcs-Szatmár-Bereg	Ibrány–Nagyhalászi	2,105	4517
Gelej	V	Borsod-Abaúj-Zemplén	Mezocsáti	704	3444
Gelénes	V	Szabolcs-Szatmár-Bereg	Vásárosnaményi	611	4935
Gellénháza	V	Zala	Zalaegerszegi	1,689	8981
Gelse	V	Zala	Nagykanizsai	1,183	8774
Gelsesziget	V	Zala	Nagykanizsai	278	8774
Gemzse	V	Szabolcs-Szatmár-Bereg	Vásárosnaményi	849	4567
Gencsapáti	V	Vas	Szombathelyi	2,665	9721
Gérce	V	Vas	Sárvári	1,195	9672
Gerde	V	Baranya	Szentlorinci	583	7951
Gerendás	V	Békés	Orosházi	1,568	5925
Gerényes	V	Baranya	Sásdi	277	7362
Geresdlak	V	Baranya	Mohácsi	935	7733
Gerjen	V	Tolna	Paksi	1,362	7134
Gersekarát	V	Vas	Vasvári	773	9813
Geszt	V	Békés	Sarkadi	861	5734
Gesztely	V	Borsod-Abaúj-Zemplén	Miskolci	2,880	3715
Geszteréd	V	Szabolcs-Szatmár-Bereg	Nagykállói	1,789	4232
Gétye	V	Zala	Keszthely–Hévízi	129	8762
Gic	V	Veszprém	Pápai	506	8435
Gige	V	Somogy	Kaposvári	363	7527
Gilvánfa	V	Baranya	Sellyei	392	7954
Girincs	V	Borsod-Abaúj-Zemplén	Tiszaújvárosi	815	3578
Gógánfa	V	Veszprém	Sümegi	792	8346
Golop	V	Borsod-Abaúj-Zemplén	Szerencsi	656	3906
Gomba	V	Pest	Monori	2,818	2217
Gombosszeg	V	Zala	Zalaegerszegi	50	8984
Gór	V	Tolna	Csepregi	241	9625
Gordisa	V	Baranya	Siklósi	312	7853
Gosztola	V	Zala	Lenti	51	8960
Göd	T	Pest	Dunakeszi	15,659	2131
Gödöllő	T	Pest	Gödölloi	31,465	2100
Gödre	V	Baranya	Sásdi	966	7386
Gölle	V	Somogy	Kaposvári	1,157	7272
Gömörszolos	V	Borsod-Abaúj-Zemplén	Ózdi	92	3728
Gönc	T	Borsod-Abaúj-Zemplén	Abaúj–Hegyközi	2,268	3895
Göncruszka	V	Borsod-Abaúj-Zemplén	Abaúj–Hegyközi	701	3894
Gönyu	V	Gyor-Moson-Sopron	Gyori	3,065	9071
Görbeháza	V	Hajdú-Bihar	Polgári	2,672	4075
Görcsöny	V	Baranya	Pécsi	1,726	7833
Görcsönydoboka	V	Baranya	Mohácsi	438	7728
Görgeteg	V	Somogy	Nagyatádi	1,239	7553
Gosfa	V	Zala	Zalaegerszegi	363	8913
Grábóc	V	Tolna	Bonyhádi	208	7162
Gulács	V	Szabolcs-Szatmár-Bereg	Vásárosnaményi	891	4842
Gutorfölde	V	Zala	Lenti	1,212	8951

== Notes ==
- Cities marked with * have several different post codes, the one here is only the most general one.
