= Halmaj =

- Village
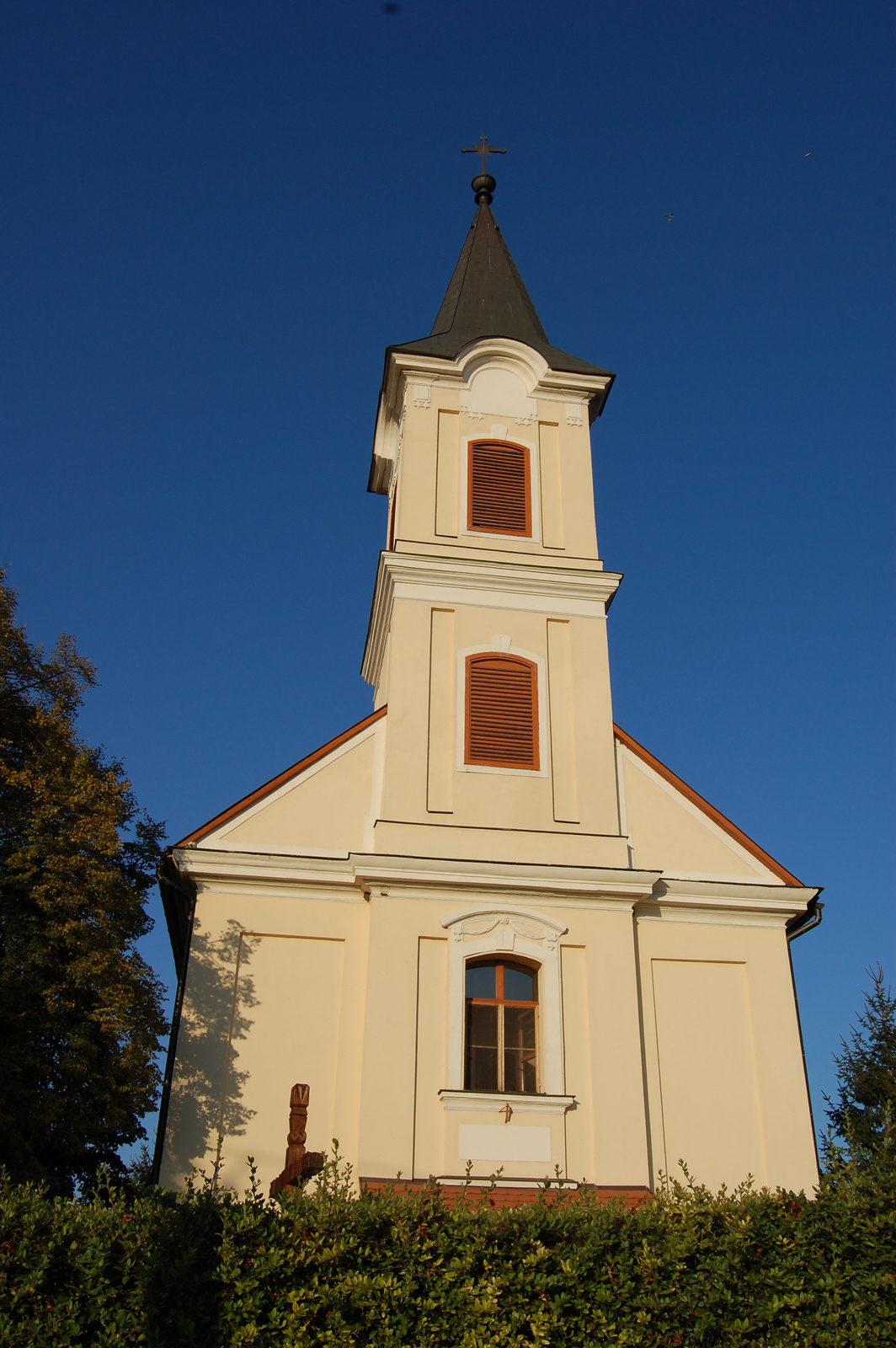

- Flag Coat of arms

- Location of Halmaj
- Coordinates: 48.24631°N 20.99708°E
- Country: Hungary
- Region: Northern Hungary
- County: Borsod-Abaúj-Zemplén
- District: Szikszó

Area
  - Total: 12.6 km^{2} (4.9 sq mi)

Population (1 January 2025)
  - Total: 1,712
  - Density: 136/km^{2} (352/sq mi)
- Time zone: UTC+1 (CET)
  - Summer (DST): UTC+2 (CEST)
- Postal code: 3842
- Area code: (+36) 46
- Website: www.halmaj.hu

Halmaj is a village in Borsod-Abaúj-Zemplén county, Hungary. Before World War II, there was a Jewish community in Halmaj. At its height, there were 61 Jews in the community most of them were murdered by the Nazis in the Holocaust.
