= Csaba Hatala-Orosz =

Hungarian politician

Member of the National Assembly
- Assuming office 9 May 2026
- Succeeding: Zoltán Demeter
- Constituency: Borsod-Abaúj-Zemplén 4th

Personal details
- Party: Tisza

Csaba Hatala-Orosz is a Hungarian politician who was elected member of the National Assembly in 2026 representing the Borsod-Abaúj-Zemplén County 4th constituency. He previously worked as a teacher.
