= Litka =

- Location of Borsod-Abaúj-Zemplén county in Hungary

- Location of Litka
- Coordinates: 48.45552°N 21.05841°E
- Country: Hungary
- County: Borsod-Abaúj-Zemplén

Area
  - Total: 6.7 km^{2} (2.6 sq mi)

Population (2004)
  - Total: 64
  - Density: 9.55/km^{2} (24.7/sq mi)
- Time zone: UTC+1 (CET)
  - Summer (DST): UTC+2 (CEST)
- Postal code: 3866
- Area code: 46

Litka is a village in Borsod-Abaúj-Zemplén county, Hungary.
