= Zoltán Demeter =

Hungarian politician

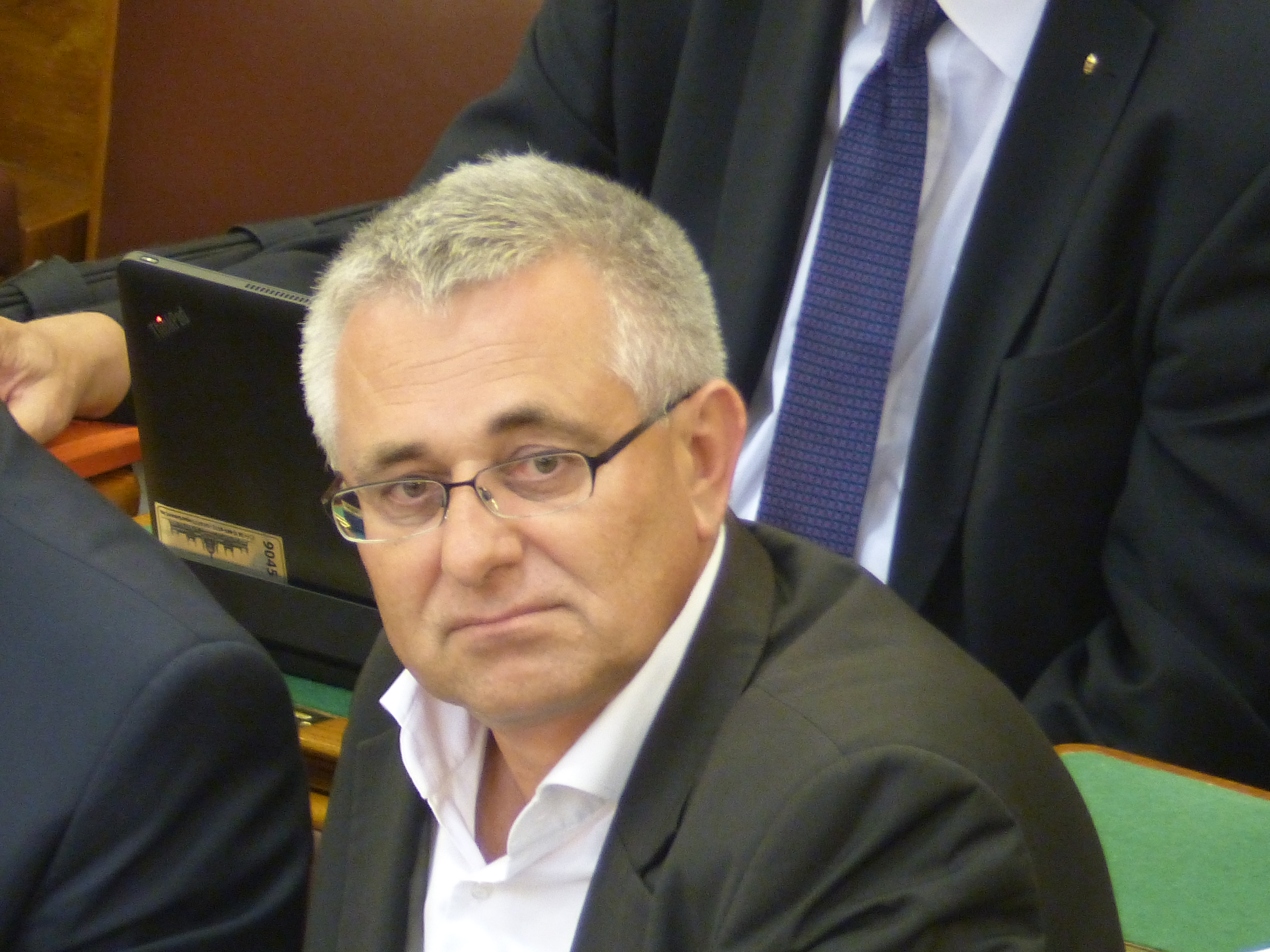
- Zoltán Demeter in 2016

Member of the National Assembly
- In office 14 May 2010 – 8 May 2026

Personal details
- Born: 1 December 1963 (age 62) Ózd, Hungary
- Party: Fidesz
- Children: Zsuzsanna; Zoltán; Ádám
- Profession: politician

Zoltán Demeter (born December 1, 1963) is a Hungarian Calvinist pastor and politician, member of the National Assembly (MP) for Sajószentpéter (Borsod-Abaúj-Zemplén County Constituency VI) from 2010 to 2014, and for Kazincbarcika (Borsod-Abaúj-Zemplén County Constituency IV) from 2014 to 2026. He was a member of the Committee on Human Rights, Minority, Civic and Religious Affairs and Committee on Education, Science and Research between May 14, 2010 and May 5, 2014, then Culture Committee between May 6, 2014 and May 1, 2022. He had been a member of the Justice Committee from May 6, 2014 to May 8, 2026. He served as vice-chairman of the Culture Committee between May 2, 2022 and May 8, 2026.

Demeter also served as mayor of Bánhorváti between 1998 and 2014, and was also a member of the General Assembly of Borsod-Abaúj-Zemplén County from 2006 to 2010. After four consecutive victories, he was defeated by Tisza candidate Csaba Hatala-Orosz in the 2026 Hungarian parliamentary election.

== Personal life ==
He is married and has a daughter, Zsuzsanna and two sons, Zoltán and Ádám.
