= Felsővadász =

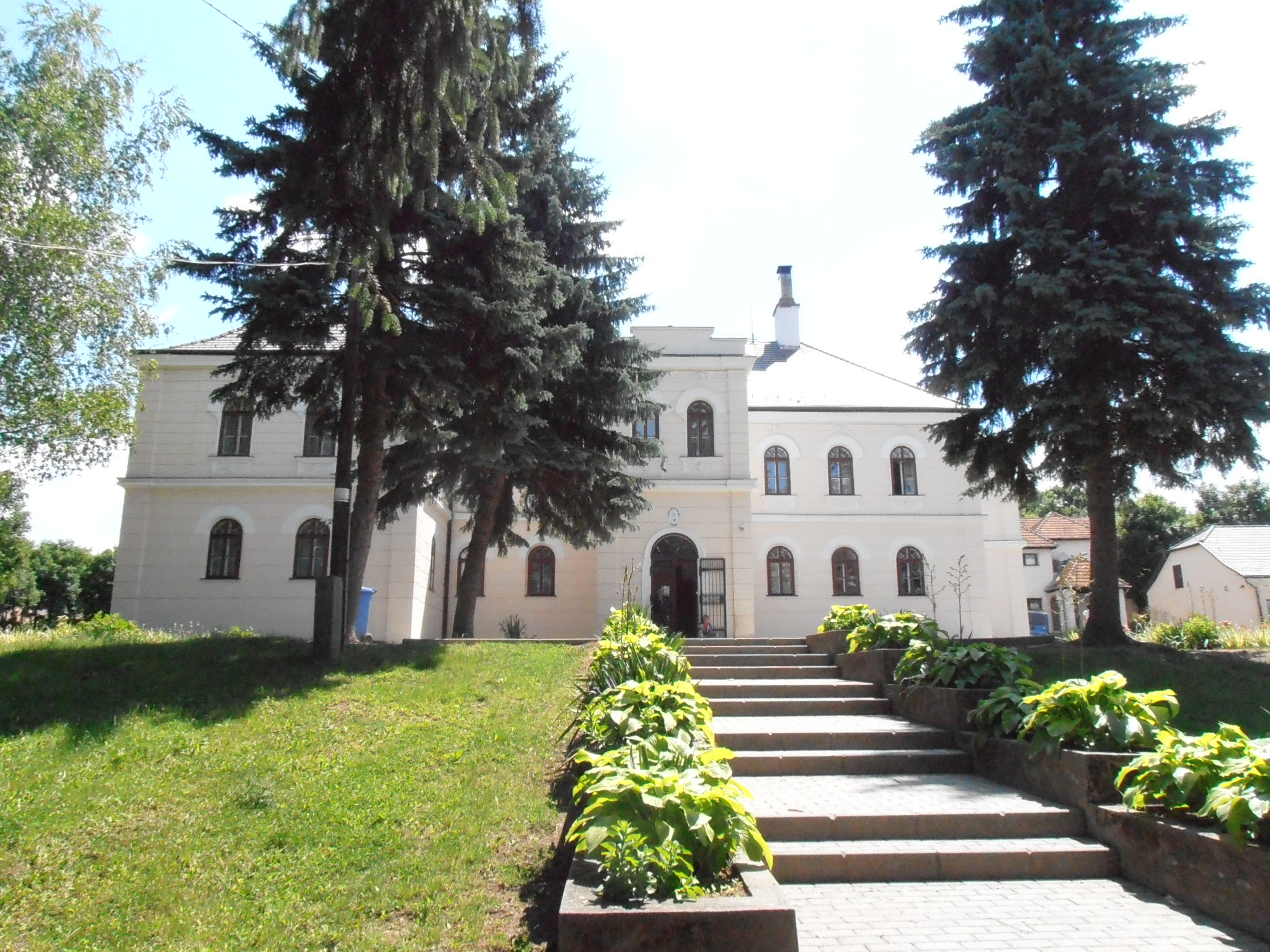
- Rákóczi family castle

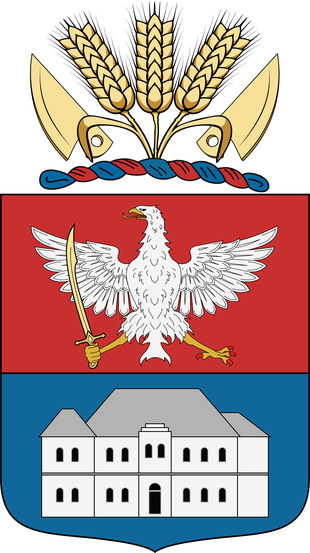
- Coat of arms

- Location of Felsővadász
- Coordinates: 48.37034°N 20.92010°E
- Country: Hungary
- County: Borsod-Abaúj-Zemplén

Area
  - Total: 18.64 km^{2} (7.20 sq mi)

Population (2004)
  - Total: 550
  - Density: 29.5/km^{2} (76/sq mi)
- Time zone: UTC+1 (CET)
  - Summer (DST): UTC+2 (CEST)
- Postal code: 3814
- Area code: 46

Felsővadász (Rusyn: Горні Вадас) is a village in Borsod-Abaúj-Zemplén county, Hungary.

== Geography ==
Felsővadász village is located in the valley between Kupa and Gadna. The closest towns are Szikszó (18 km), Edelény and Encs (kb. 30 km).

== History ==
The name Felsővadász means "upper-hunter," because this location was given to the royal hunters together with Alsóvadász ("lower-hunter"). The first mention was in 1279. The Rákóczi family bought the village in 1517. The Turkish army attacked and burned the castle in 1567. In 1860, a windstorm ruined the wooden Greek Catholic Church, so a new church was erected in 1864.

== Notable people ==
The family castle of George II Rákóczi is in this village what appears in the lower part of the coat of arms.
