= Balajt =

- Location of Borsod-Abaúj-Zemplén county in Hungary

- Location of Balajt
- Coordinates: 48.320381°N 20.787831°E
- Country: Hungary
- County: Borsod-Abaúj-Zemplén

Area
  - Total: 9.03 km^{2} (3.49 sq mi)

Population (2004)
  - Total: 460
  - Density: 50.94/km^{2} (131.9/sq mi)
- Time zone: UTC+1 (CET)
  - Summer (DST): UTC+2 (CEST)
- Postal code: 3780
- Area code: 48

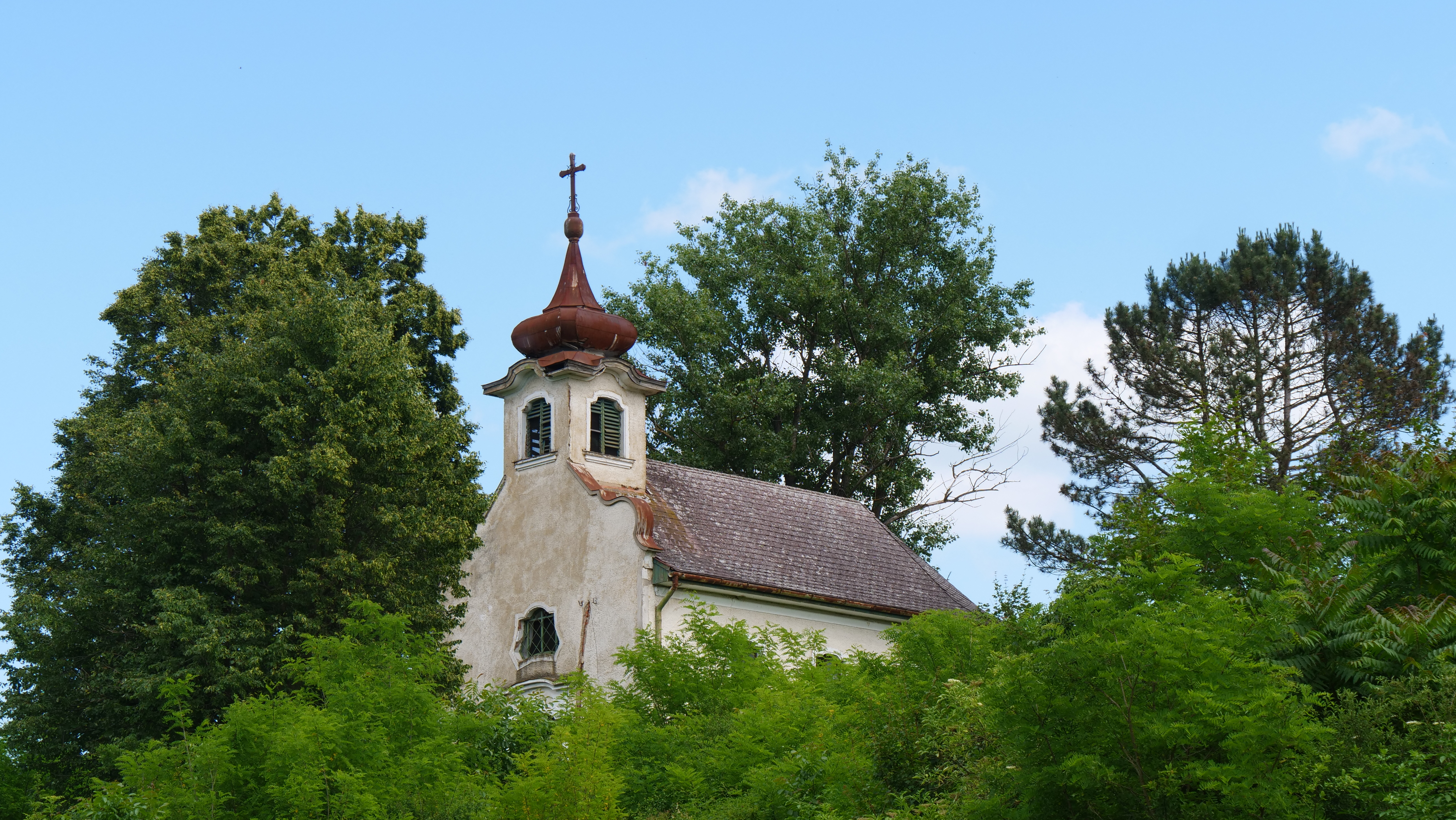
Saint Joseph the Worker, Roman Catholic Church, Balajt

Balajt is a village in Borsod-Abaúj-Zemplén county, Hungary.
