= Hangács =

- Coat of arms

- Location of Hangács in Hungary
- Coordinates: 48°17′24.36″N 20°49′46.34″E
- Country: Hungary
- Region: Northern Hungary
- County: Borsod-Abaúj-Zemplén
- Subregion: Edelény
- Rank: Village

Area
  - Total: 22.53 km^{2} (8.70 sq mi)

Population (2009)
  - Total: 653
  - Density: 29.0/km^{2} (75.1/sq mi)
- Time zone: UTC+1 (CET)
  - Summer (DST): UTC+2 (CEST)
- Postal code: 3795
- Area code: +36 46
- KSH code: 11226
- Website: https://www.hangacs.hu/

Hangács is a village in Borsod-Abaúj-Zemplén County in northeastern Hungary. As of 2008 it had a population of 645. In 2015 it had a population of 581. It is around 25km North of Edelény. For a long time it was hard to access the village, only being accessible from a side road from the 2617 road. Following Hungary's admittance to the European Union, a road to the village was built.
