= Baktakék =

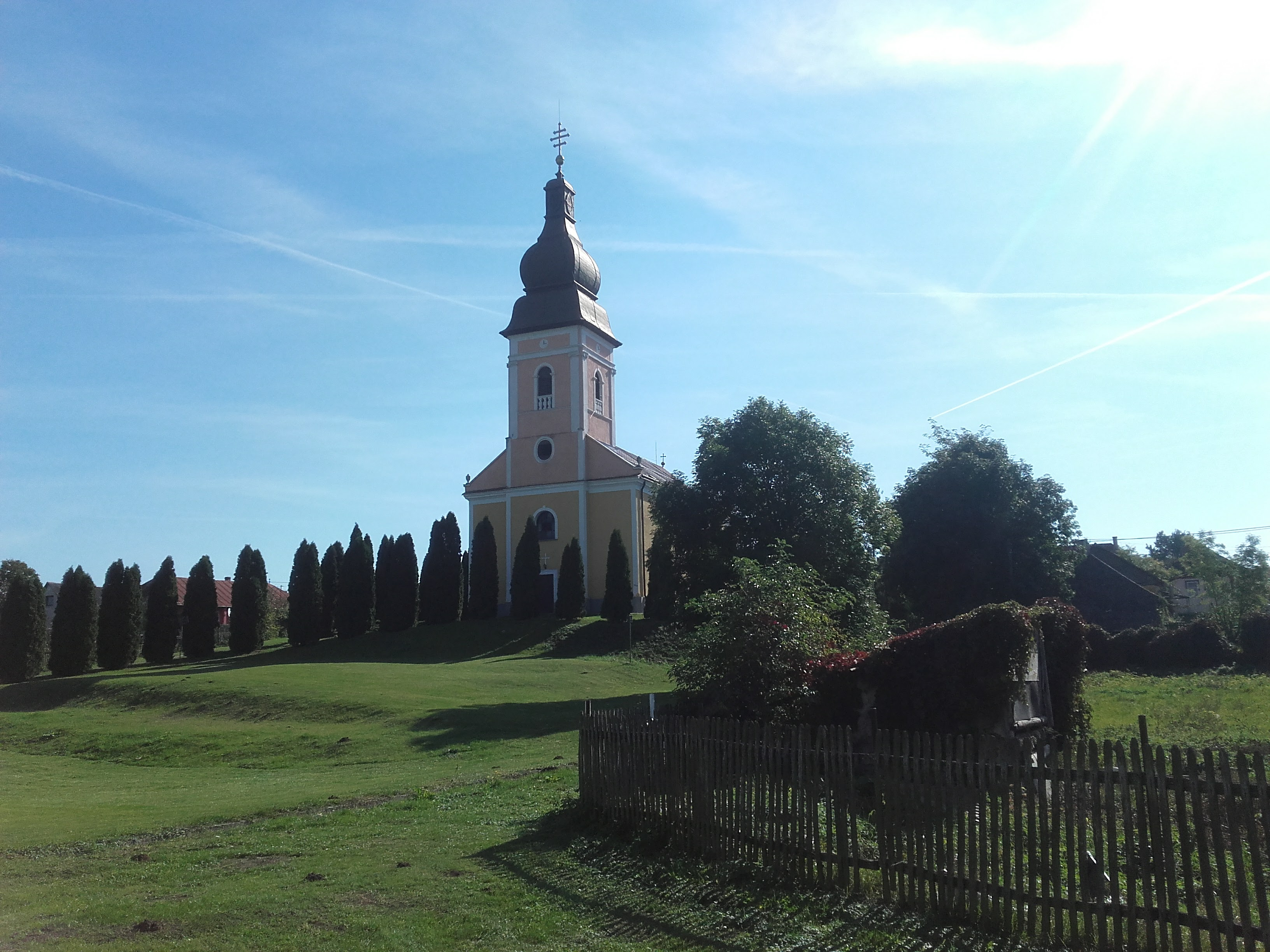

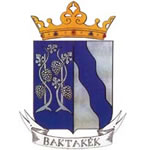
- Seal

- Location of Borsod-Abaúj-Zemplén county in Hungary

- Location of Baktakék
- Coordinates: 48.36930°N 21.02888°E
- Country: Hungary
- County: Borsod-Abaúj-Zemplén

Area
  - Total: 18.79 km^{2} (7.25 sq mi)

Population (2004)
  - Total: 744
  - Density: 39.59/km^{2} (102.5/sq mi)
- Time zone: UTC+1 (CET)
  - Summer (DST): UTC+2 (CEST)
- Postal code: 3836
- Area code: 46

Baktakék (Rusyn: Кек) is a village in Borsod-Abaúj-Zemplén county, Hungary.

There is a Jewish cemetery in the village.

== Location and geography ==
Baktakék is located in the central part of the Száraz Valley, the central village of Cserehát. The Cserehát hills belong to the landscapes of the Northern Central Mountains, wedged between the Northern Borsodi Karst Mountains and the valley of the Hernád River. Part of the village is a hilly area.

The directly bordering settlements are: Alsógagy from the north, Fáj from the northeast, Fancsal from the east, Beret from the south, Selyeb from the southwest, Abaújszolnok from the west, and Gagyapáti from the northwest.

Among the countless streams and creeks that flow into the Hernád, the settlement is crossed by the Vasonca stream. Most of the hills are covered with fields. The most common protected plant is the tuberous cat's testicle. The exotic acacia can be found in many places, and beech trees are common. Among the birds of prey, the buzzard is a daily guest. Deer, wild boar, and fox are common. The countryside is also home to many species of butterflies.
