= Tomor, Hungary =

Tomor
- Location of Borsod-Abaúj-Zemplén county in Hungary

- Location of Tomor, Hungary
- Coordinates: 48.32661°N 20.88325°E
- Country: Hungary
- County: Borsod-Abaúj-Zemplén

Area
  - Total: 12.89 km^{2} (4.98 sq mi)

Population (2004)
  - Total: 267
  - Density: 20.71/km^{2} (53.6/sq mi)
- Time zone: UTC+1 (CET)
  - Summer (DST): UTC+2 (CEST)
- Postal code: 3787
- Area code: 48

Tomor is a village in Borsod-Abaúj-Zemplén county, Hungary.
