= Tornabarakony =

- Location of Borsod-Abaúj-Zemplén county in Hungary

- Location of Tornabarakony
- Coordinates: 48.49257°N 20.81944°E
- Country: Hungary
- County: Borsod-Abaúj-Zemplén

Area
  - Total: 8.2 km^{2} (3.2 sq mi)

Population (2025)
  - Total: 24
  - Density: 1.58/km^{2} (4.1/sq mi)
- Time zone: UTC+1 (CET)
  - Summer (DST): UTC+2 (CEST)
- Postal code: 3765
- Area code: 48

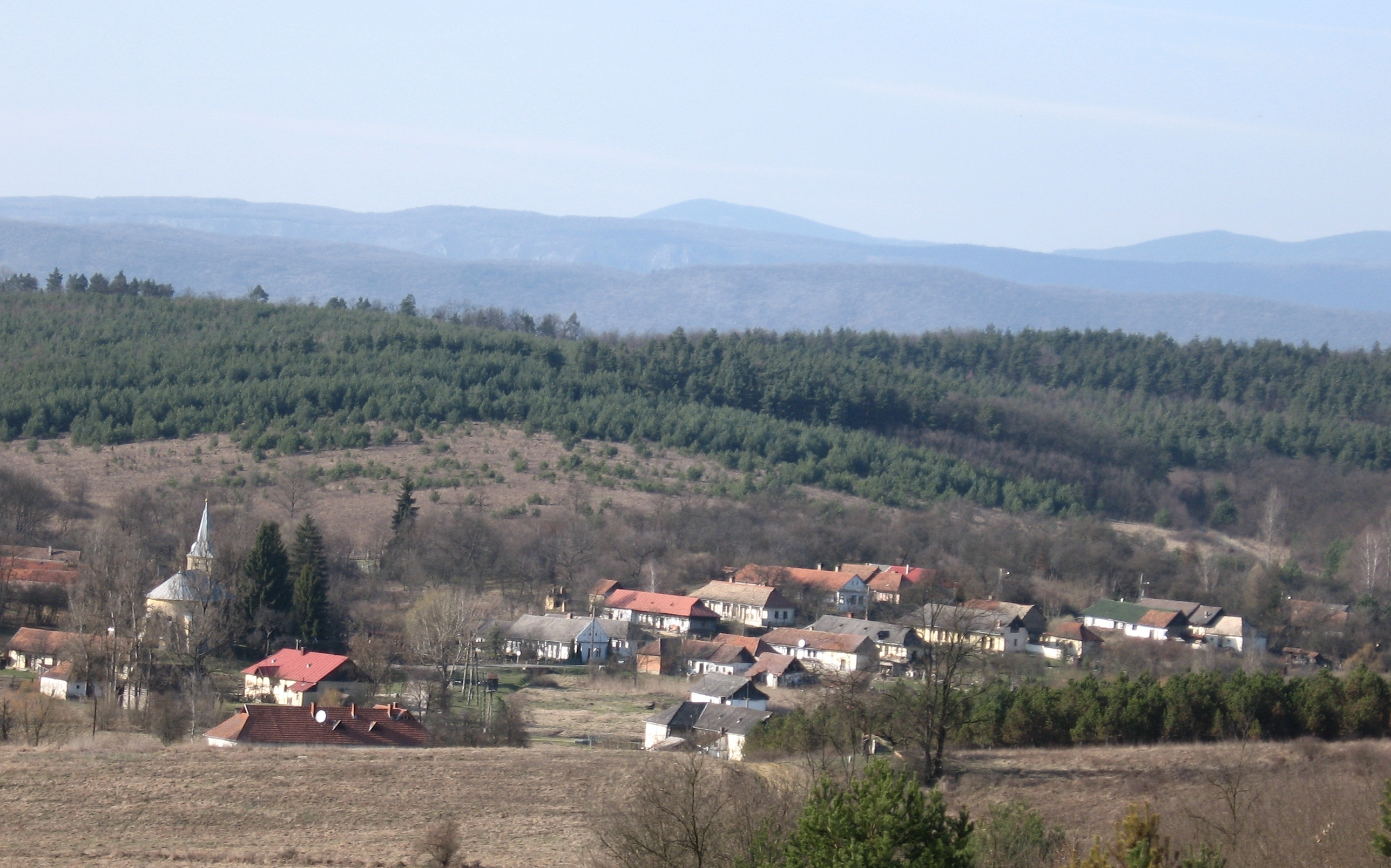
Tornabarakony

Tornabarakony (Rusyn: Бараконь) is a village in Borsod-Abaúj-Zemplén, Hungary.
