= Pamlény =

- Village
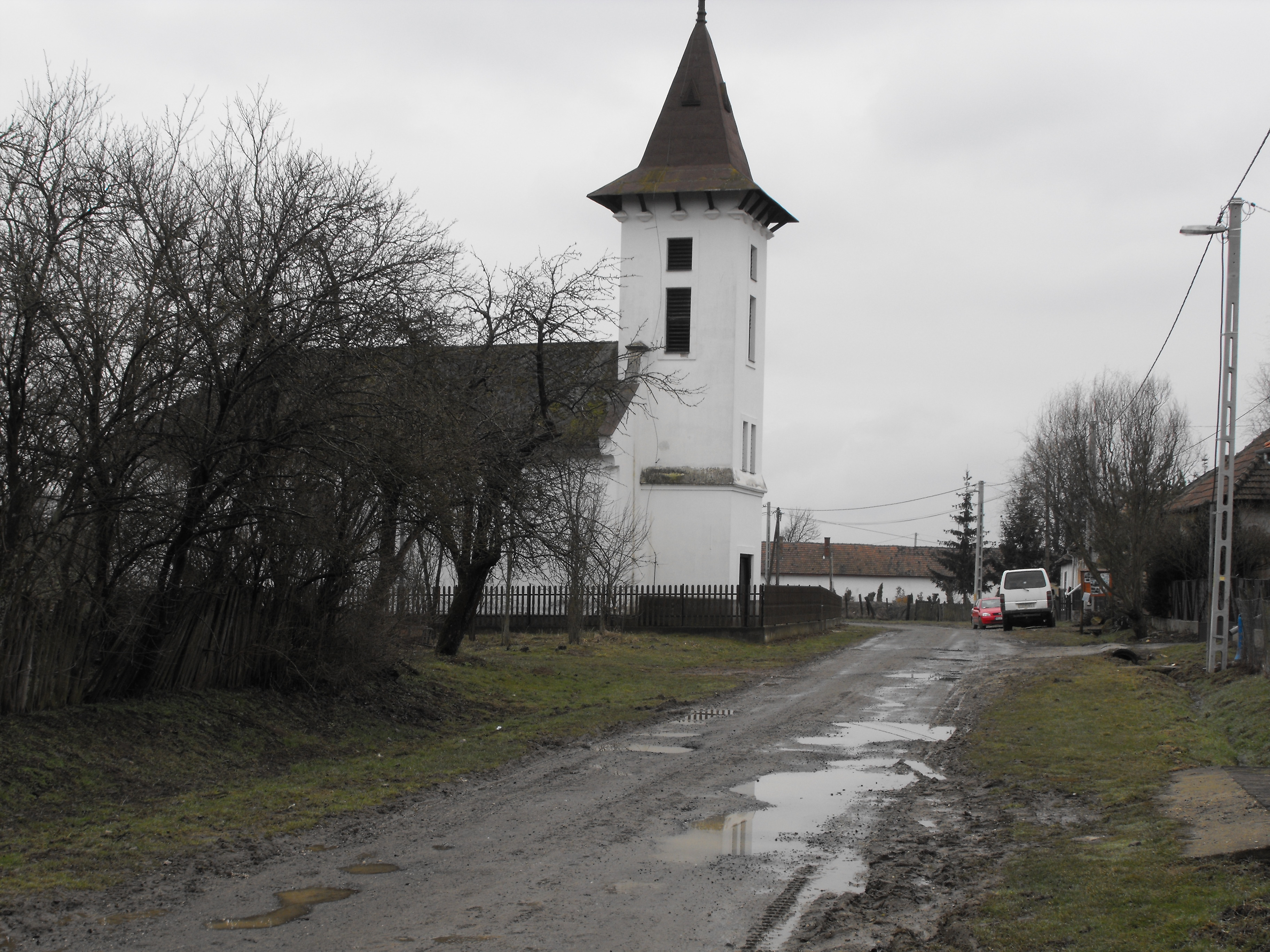
- Pamlény

- Location within Hungary
- Coordinates: 48°30′N 20°56′E
- Country: Hungary
- Regions: Northern Hungary
- County: Borsod-Abaúj-Zemplén County
- Time zone: UTC+1 (CET)
  - Summer (DST): UTC+2 (CEST)

Pamlény is a village in Borsod-Abaúj-Zemplén County in northeastern Hungary.
