= Galvács =

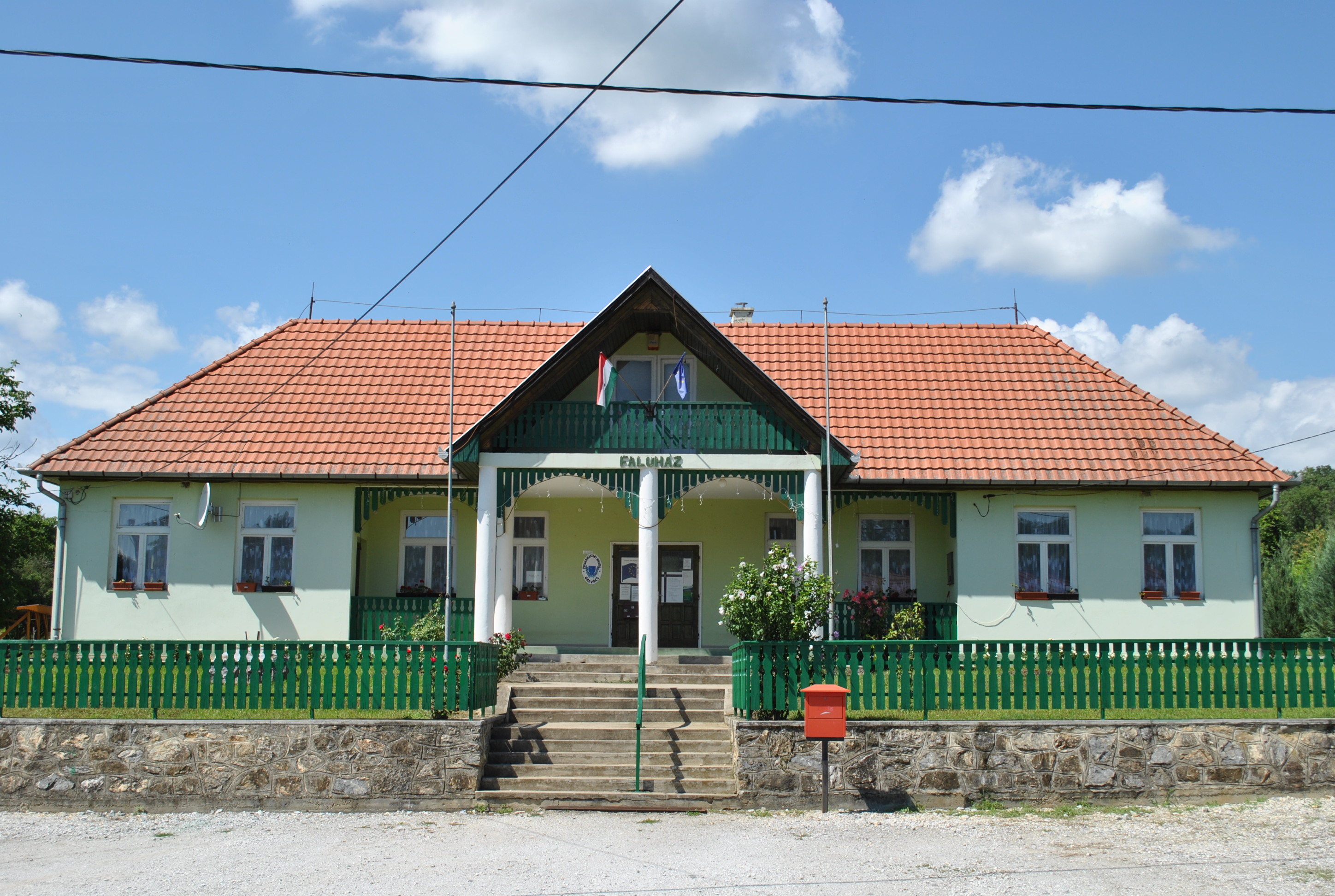
- Village hall

- Flag Coat of arms

- Location of Galvács in Hungary
- Coordinates: 48°25′12.04″N 20°46′38.03″E
- Country: Hungary
- Region: Northern Hungary
- County: Borsod-Abaúj-Zemplén
- Subregion: Edelény
- Rank: Village

Area
  - Total: 15.04 km^{2} (5.81 sq mi)

Population (2009)
  - Total: 91
  - Density: 6.1/km^{2} (16/sq mi)
- Time zone: UTC+1 (CET)
  - Summer (DST): UTC+2 (CEST)
- Postal code: 3752
- Area code: +36 48
- KSH code: 19293
- Website: www.galvacs.hu

Galvács is a village in Borsod-Abaúj-Zemplén County in northeastern Hungary. As of 2008 it had a population of 95. But in 2009, it was 91.
