= Kiskinizs =

- Location of Borsod-Abaúj-Zemplén county in Hungary

- Location of Kiskinizs
- Coordinates: 48.25113°N 21.03444°E
- Country: Hungary
- County: Borsod-Abaúj-Zemplén

Area
  - Total: 7.18 km^{2} (2.77 sq mi)

Population (2004)
  - Total: 360
  - Density: 50.13/km^{2} (129.8/sq mi)
- Time zone: UTC+1 (CET)
  - Summer (DST): UTC+2 (CEST)
- Postal code: 3843
- Area code: 46

Kiskinizs is a village in Borsod-Abaúj-Zemplén county, Hungary.
