= Gagybátor =

- Coat of arms

- Location of Gagybátor in Hungary
- Coordinates: 48°26′2.18″N 20°56′59.39″E
- Country: Hungary
- Region: Northern Hungary
- County: Borsod-Abaúj-Zemplén
- Subregion: Szikszó
- Rank: Village

Area
  - Total: 18.77 km^{2} (7.25 sq mi)

Population (2009)
  - Total: 238
  - Density: 12.7/km^{2} (32.8/sq mi)
- Time zone: UTC+1 (CET)
  - Summer (DST): UTC+2 (CEST)
- Postal code: 3817
- Area code: +36 46
- KSH code: 28307
- Website: www.gagybator.hu

Gagybátor is a village in Borsod-Abaúj-Zemplén County in northeastern Hungary. As of 2008 it had a population of 240. But in 2009 it was 238.

== Landmarks ==
- United Reformed Church
- Ruins of Jakabfalvy mansion

== Notable people ==
- György Györffy, ethnologist and historian
