= Abaújlak =

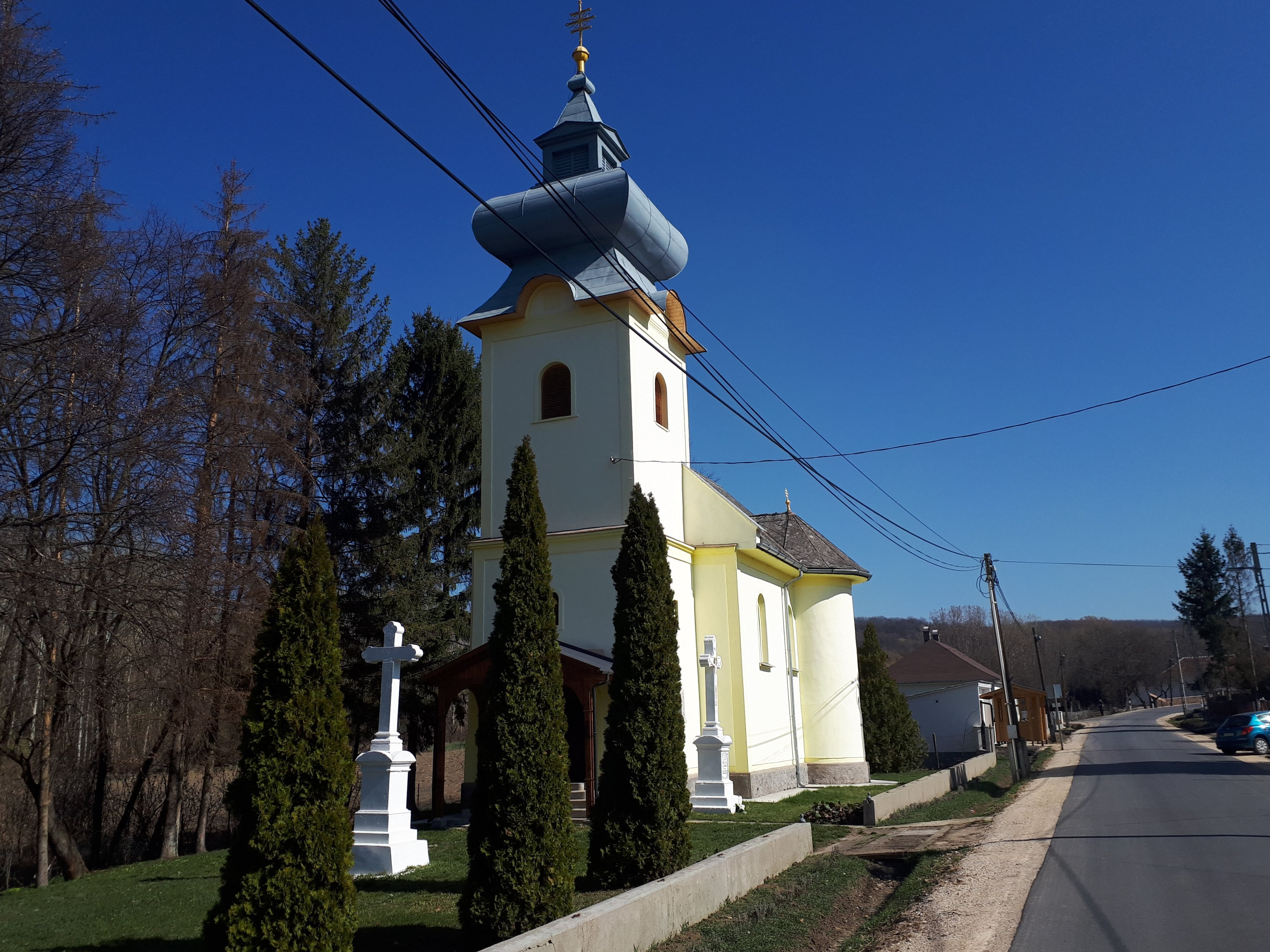

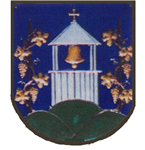
- Coat of arms

- Location of Borsod-Abaúj-Zemplén county in Hungary

- Location of Abaújlak
- Coordinates: 48.40566°N 20.95617°E
- Country: Hungary
- County: Borsod-Abaúj-Zemplén

Government
  - Mayor: Pollák István (Ind.)

Area
  - Total: 7.06 km^{2} (2.73 sq mi)

Population (2022)
  - Total: 62
  - Density: 8.8/km^{2} (23/sq mi)
- Time zone: UTC+1 (CET)
  - Summer (DST): UTC+2 (CEST)
- Postal code: 3815
- Area code: 46

Abaújlak is a village in Borsod-Abaúj-Zemplén county, Hungary.
