= Homrogd =

- Coat of arms

- Location of Borsod-Abaúj-Zemplén county in Hungary

- Location of Homrogd
- Coordinates: 48.28374°N 20.91236°E
- Country: Hungary
- County: Borsod-Abaúj-Zemplén

Area
  - Total: 13.43 km^{2} (5.19 sq mi)

Population (2004)
  - Total: 1,045
  - Density: 77.81/km^{2} (201.5/sq mi)
- Time zone: UTC+1 (CET)
  - Summer (DST): UTC+2 (CEST)
- Postal code: 3812
- Area code: 46

Homrogd is a village in Borsod-Abaúj-Zemplén county, Hungary.
