= Szakácsi =

Coordinates: 48°23′N 20°52′E

- Village
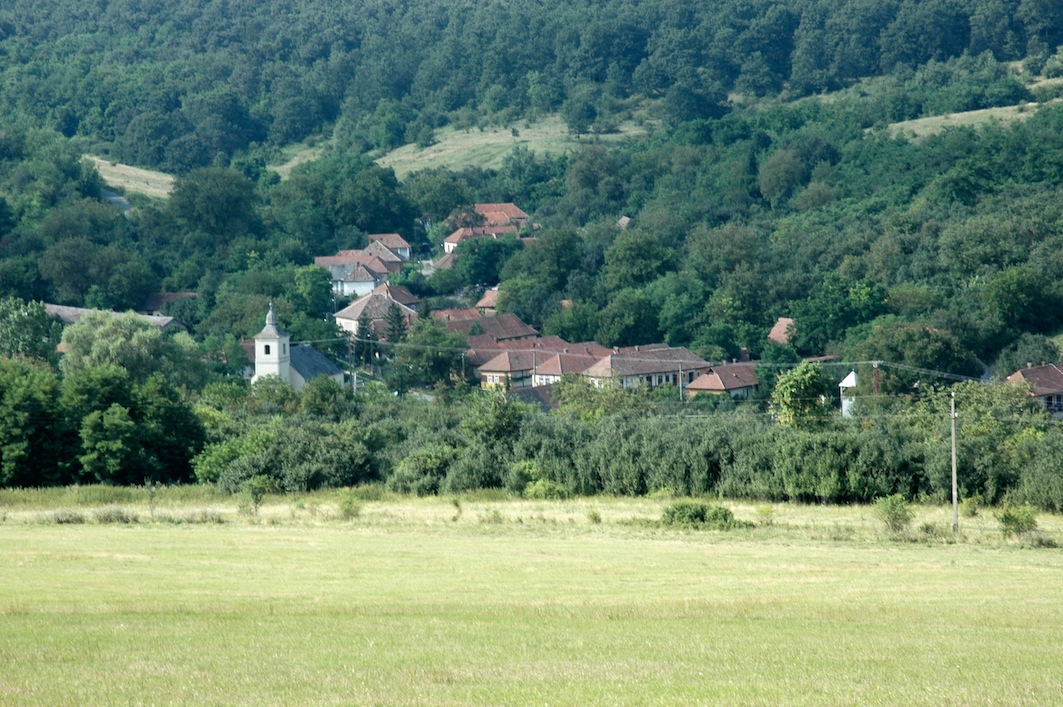
- Szakácsi, Hungary

- Coat of arms
- Interactive map of Szakácsi
- Country: Hungary
- Regions: Northern Hungary
- County: Borsod-Abaúj-Zemplén County
- Time zone: UTC+1 (CET)
  - Summer (DST): UTC+2 (CEST)

Szakácsi is a village in Borsod-Abaúj-Zemplén County in northeastern Hungary. Szakácsi has 150 inhabitants and is situated on either side of the Vadasz-patak (stream) against the hills. It has two churches (Catholic and Reformatory), a village house, a shop for basic necessities, a slow food restaurant, a bus and two flocks of sheep.

== Landscape and environment ==
Szakácsi is centrally located in the Cserehát, an area in the shape of a V, bounded by the rivers Hernád and Bodva and the border with Slovakia. The landscape is reminiscent of the Dordogne or Tuscany: hills with forest and agricultural areas, sleepy villages and rural scenery. The villages are generously scattered over the Cserehát with a mutual distance of 2 to 5 kilometres.

The Cserehát is a poor area. Some employment in Szakácsi is provided by two farmers, some in forestry and recently by a company that converts empty houses into holiday homes. The Cserehát is the fruit garden of Hungary, with an abundance of apricots, peaches, plums, apples and cherries. Many people bring their fruit to the local distillery to make Palinka (sometimes more than 40% alcohol). The woods around Szakácsi are also known for the porcini, chanterelles, and trompes de la mort. The villagers say that even white truffle can be found ...

Along Szakácsi there are two long-distance footpaths, the red Cserehát route and Országos Kektúra, the blue route, part of the European network of long-distance footpaths.

== Name ==
Szakácsi means "village of chefs." The history of Szakácsi goes back to 1300. The inhabitants probably paid 'tax' by cooking for the king. Some say that the chef of the king lived here. It seems therefore logically that cooking pots and butcher choppers adorn the coat of arms of Szakácsi.
