= Irota =

Irota Ірота (Rusyn)
- Location of Borsod-Abaúj-Zemplén county in Hungary

- Location of Irota
- Coordinates: 48.39727°N 20.87608°E
- Country: Hungary
- County: Borsod-Abaúj-Zemplén

Area
  - Total: 12.34 km^{2} (4.76 sq mi)

Population (2004)
  - Total: 108
  - Density: 8.75/km^{2} (22.7/sq mi)
- Time zone: UTC+1 (CET)
  - Summer (DST): UTC+2 (CEST)
- Postal code: 3786
- Area code: 48

Irota (Rusyn: Ірота) is a village in Borsod-Abaúj-Zemplén county, Hungary. It is 20 kilometres north of the town of Edelény, 180 metres above sea level in a narrow valley. Its only stream, the ‘Hunters’ Creek’ (Vadászpatak in Hungarian) runs south. In the forest area which starts from the northern end of Irota, there is the highest peak of the region (the so-called Goat Bank, or Kecskepad) at a height of 340 metres.

== History ==
The village was mentioned for the first time in 1320. By 1726, the population consisted both of Hungarian and Ruthenian speakers. Most of the inhabitants were shepherds, foresters and small farmers. In the 19th century, a local quarry was used to produce the locally applied bricks and rooftiles.

In 1851, Irota was home to 36 Roman Catholics, 358 Greek Catholics, 5 Calvinists, 4 Evangelicals and 8 Jews. The latest census (2001) mentions 117 inhabitants, of which 38 Roman Catholics, 70 Greek Catholics, 6 Calvinists and 3 belonging to none of these groups.

== Architecture ==
Irota's only church is Greek Catholic. Roman Catholics go to mass here as well. The current stone building, dating from 1846, was preceded by several wooden structures. It has an iconostasis. In 1898, the originally whitewashed church interior was embellished with frescoes. Services are generally held on Sunday mornings. There is a small chapel in the main street, built in 1925 and renovated in 1965. It is used for smaller services during the week.

The mansion (Petőfi út 42) which once belonged to the noble Fáy family was used as headquarters for the Party Secretary, public library and consulting room for the visiting GP during the years of communism. After years of neglect and decay, it has recently been renovated and these days, it serves as a private residence.

The houses in the village typically have a rectangular shape and consist of three rooms. The houses do not stand in a straight line, since people always made sure to build them in the highest point of their plot to protect them from water damage.

The village is home to rare plant and bird species. It has several guest houses and three eco-friendly lodges were opened at its edge in 2016.
