= Csenyéte =

- Location of Borsod-Abaúj-Zemplén county in Hungary

- Location of Csenyéte
- Coordinates: 48.43508°N 21.04170°E
- Country: Hungary
- County: Borsod-Abaúj-Zemplén

Area
  - Total: 9.97 km^{2} (3.85 sq mi)

Population (2004)
  - Total: 421
  - Density: 42.22/km^{2} (109.3/sq mi)
- Time zone: UTC+1 (CET)
  - Summer (DST): UTC+2 (CEST)
- Postal code: 3837
- Area code: 46

Csenyéte is a village in Borsod-Abaúj-Zemplén county, Hungary. The village has an almost entirely Roma population. It is famous for being considered the poorest settlement in Hungary.
