= Abaújszolnok =

- Location of Borsod-Abaúj-Zemplén county in Hungary

- Location of Abaújszolnok
- Coordinates: 48.37321°N 20.97562°E
- Country: Hungary
- County: Borsod-Abaúj-Zemplén

Area
  - Total: 8.65 km^{2} (3.34 sq mi)

Population (2004)
  - Total: 156
  - Density: 18.03/km^{2} (46.7/sq mi)
- Time zone: UTC+1 (CET)
  - Summer (DST): UTC+2 (CEST)
- Postal code: 3809
- Area code: 46

Abaújszolnok (Rusyn: Солнок) is a village in Borsod-Abaúj-Zemplén county, Hungary.
