= Gagyvendégi =

- Village
- Coat of arms

- Location of Gagyvendégi in Hungary
- Coordinates: 48°25′50.88″N 20°58′29.93″E
- Country: Hungary
- Region: Northern Hungary
- County: Borsod-Abaúj-Zemplén
- Subregion: Szikszó

Area
  - Total: 12.32 km^{2} (4.76 sq mi)

Population (2009)
  - Total: 188
  - Density: 15.3/km^{2} (39.5/sq mi)
- Time zone: UTC+1 (CET)
  - Summer (DST): UTC+2 (CEST)
- Postal code: 3816
- Area code: +36 46
- KSH code: 03744
- Website: http://selyeb.hu/gagyvendegi

Gagyvendégi is a village in Borsod-Abaúj-Zemplén County in northeastern Hungary. As of 2008, it had a population of 198. But in 2009, it was 188.
