= Gagyapáti =

- Village
- Location within Hungary
- Coordinates: 48°24′32.11″N 21°0′12.82″E
- Country: Hungary
- Regions: Northern Hungary
- County: Borsod-Abaúj-Zemplén County

Area
  - Total: 3.22 km^{2} (1.24 sq mi)

Population (2008)
  - Total: 24
- Time zone: UTC+1 (CET)
  - Summer (DST): UTC+2 (CEST)

Gagyapáti (Rusyn: Апати) is a village in Borsod-Abaúj-Zemplén County in northeastern Hungary. As of 2008 it had a population of 24.
