= Selyeb =

- Location of Borsod-Abaúj-Zemplén county in Hungary

- Location of Selyeb
- Coordinates: 48.33759°N 20.95349°E
- Country: Hungary
- County: Borsod-Abaúj-Zemplén

Area
  - Total: 16.64 km^{2} (6.42 sq mi)

Population (2004)
  - Total: 505
  - Density: 30.34/km^{2} (78.6/sq mi)
- Time zone: UTC+1 (CET)
  - Summer (DST): UTC+2 (CEST)
- Postal code: 3809
- Area code: 46

Selyeb is a village in Borsod-Abaúj-Zemplén county, Hungary.
