= Alsóvadász =

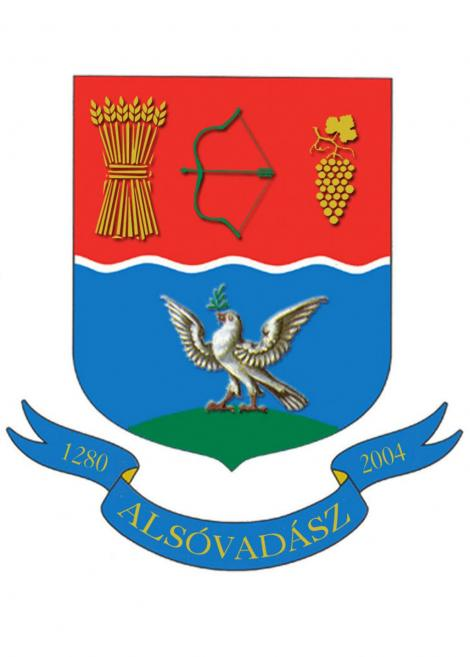
- Coat of arms

- Location of Borsod–Abaúj–Zemplén county in Hungary

- Location of Alsóvadász
- Coordinates: 48.23962°N 20.90393°E
- Country: Hungary
- County: Borsod-Abaúj-Zemplén

Area
  - Total: 22.91 km^{2} (8.85 sq mi)

Population (2004)
  - Total: 1,558
  - Density: 68/km^{2} (180/sq mi)
- Time zone: UTC+1 (CET)
  - Summer (DST): UTC+2 (CEST)
- Postal code: 3811
- Area code: 46

Alsóvadász is a village in Borsod–Abaúj–Zemplén county, Hungary.

At the end of the 19th century and the beginning of the 20th century, Jews lived in the village. In 1840, 149 Jews lived in the village and there was a Jewish cemetery there. Some of them were murdered in the Holocaust.
