= Szikszó =

- Town
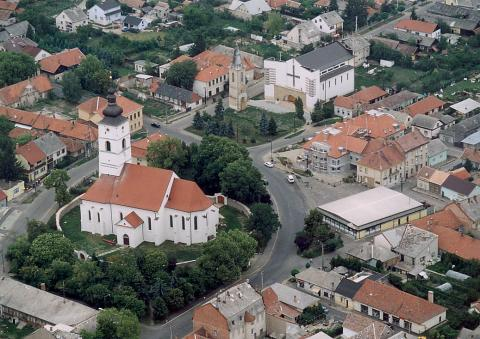
- Aerial view

- Flag Coat of arms

- Location within Hungary
- Coordinates: 48.19505°N 20.92949°E
- Country: Hungary
- County: Borsod-Abaúj-Zemplén
- District: Szikszó

Area
  - Total: 36.2 km^{2} (14.0 sq mi)

Population (2015)
  - Total: 5,410
  - Density: 149/km^{2} (387/sq mi)
- Time zone: UTC+1 (CET)
  - Summer (DST): UTC+2 (CEST)
- Postal code: 3800
- Area code: (+36) 46
- Website: www.szikszo.hu

Szikszó is a small town in Borsod-Abaúj-Zemplén county, Northern Hungary, 15 kilometres (9 miles) from the county capital Miskolc. It is also the home of the Hell Energy Magyarország Kft. main factory.

== History ==
Szikszó was first mentioned in documents in 1280. It belonged to the estate of the Aba clan. After 1370 Aba Estates in the area became the property of King Sigismund and then of Queen Mary. At this time Szikszó was already a royal town. The Gothic church of the town was also built around this time.

In the 16th century Szikszó and its landowners converted to the Protestant faith and its church became a Protestant one.

During the Ottoman occupation of Hungary the town was ransacked and burnt down several times. The citizens fortified the strongest building of the town, the church. Several battles of the Ottoman–Habsburg wars were fought in and around the town. In 1588 there was a battle near the town, where the Hungarian army defeated the Turks. In 1679 the town witnessed another battle, this time against the imperial army of the Habsburgs; this battle too brought Hungarian victory but the imperials burnt down the town as revenge.

During the freedom fight against Habsburg rule in 1848, a third battle was fought near Szikszó. Again the Hungarians won.

In 1852, a house caught fire and the whole town burnt down. Rebuilding the town was very expensive and the citizens couldn't afford the expenses of Szikszó being classified as a town, so in 1866, they asked the government to re-classify Szikszó as a village.

In 1920, after the Treaty of Trianon, Košice (Kassa in Hungarian) became part of Czechoslovakia, and Szikszó became the capital of Abaúj-Torna county. It held this rank until the unification of the three counties created Borsod-Abaúj-Zemplén county.

During World War II, Szikszó was captured by Soviet troops of the 2nd Ukrainian Front on 30 November 1944 in the course of the Budapest Offensive.

In 1989 Szikszó was granted town status again.

== Education ==
- Szepsi Csombor Márton High School

== Tourist sights ==
- Bethania manor
- Gothic Protestant Church
- Wine cellars

== Gallery ==
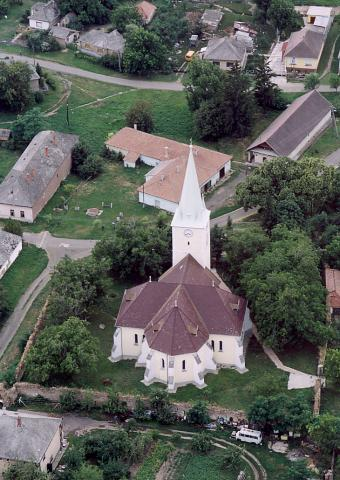

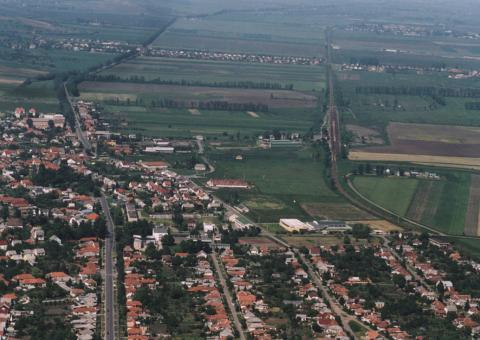

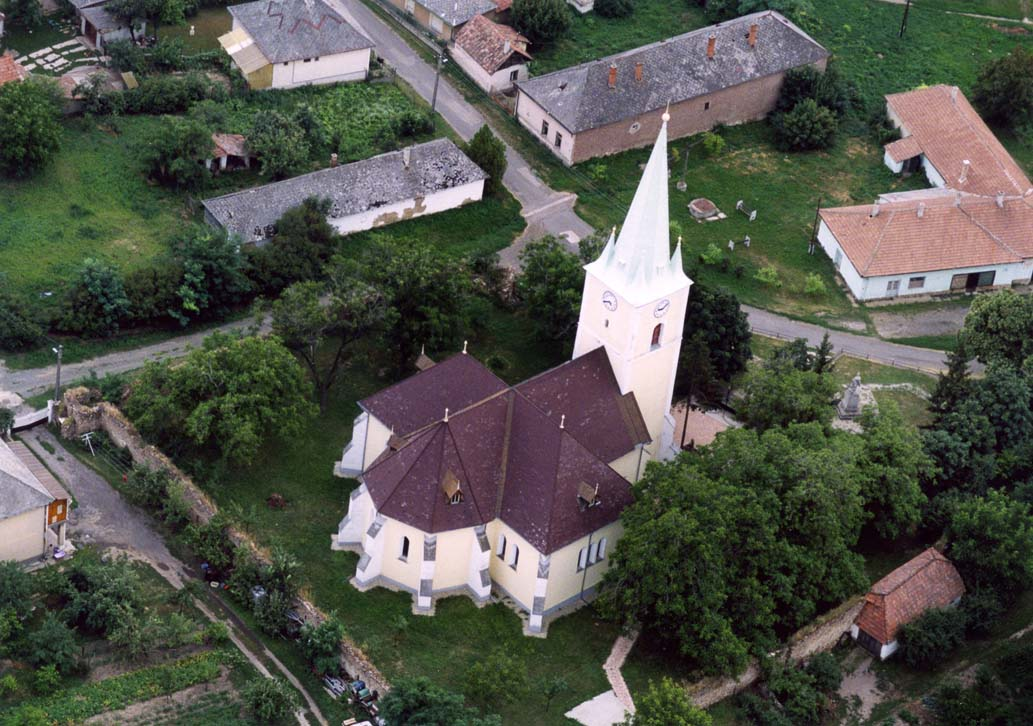

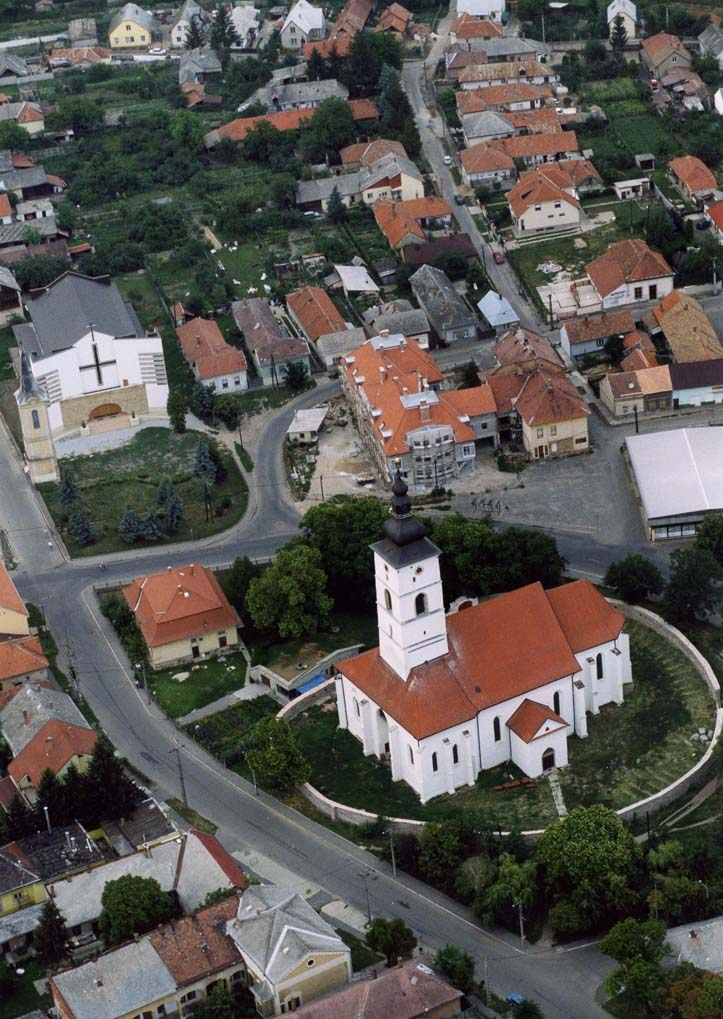

== Twin towns – sister cities ==
Szikszó is twinned with:

- Dro, Italy
- Sovata, Romania
- Stronie Śląskie, Poland
- Waldems, Germany
