= John Csetneki =

Hungarian nobleman

John (IV) Csetneki

Ispán of Bereg
- Reign: 1474–1482
- Predecessor: John Varjasi
- Successor: George Verebélyi
- Born: 1450s
- Died: 1512
- Noble family: House of Csetneki
- Spouse: Hedwig N
- Issue: Andrew II; Dorothea; Catherine
- Father: Andrew I Csetneki
- Mother: Helena Keresztúri

John (IV) Csetneki (Hungarian: Csetneki (IV.) János; died 1512) was a Hungarian nobleman in the second half of the 15th century, who served as ispán of Bereg County and castellan of Munkács (present-day Palanok, Ukraine) from 1474 to 1482, under his mistress and guardian, Queen Mother Elizabeth Szilágyi.

== Early life ==
John (IV) was born into the prestigious Csetneki family, which originated from the ancient Hungarian gens (clan) Ákos and possessed landholdings mainly in Gömör County. His father was Andrew (I), the castellan of Eger. His mother was Helena Keresztúri, who married Andrew sometime after 1449, after the death of her first husband Ladislaus Nagymihályi in that year. Thus John was born in the first years of the 1450s. John had several siblings: Ladislaus (VI) – progenitor of the last generations of the Csetnekis –, Derek, Nicholas (VI), Paul (I), Michael (II) and Catherine.

Throughout his younger years, his father stayed away from the family home Csetnek (present-day Štítnik, Slovakia) and actively participated in the wars against the Hussites in Upper Hungary as a familiaris of the Diocese of Eger. His mother Helena Keresztúri managed the estate affairs, defending the rights of the family against the claims of their neighbors, including the relative Bebeks. Andrew Csetneki, feeling his death, compiled his last will and testament in 1465. The document testifies to the person's heavy debts. Regarding his minor children, he nominated his lord, Bishop Ladislaus Hédervári, Queen Mother Elizabeth Szilágyi and Ladislaus Balassa as their guardians.

In May 1470, the four surviving sons of the late Andrew – Ladislaus, John, Nicholas and Michael – reconciled with the Bebeks in the castle of Szendrő regarding the unlawful occupation of some lands. The document says the parties wish to restore the status quo in the economic relationship between the two families. Despite that the feud continued in the following years. Both Ladislaus and John filed lawsuits against the Bebeks over the possessions rights of the ore mines at Dobsina (present-day Dobšiná, Slobakia). King Matthias Corvinus permitted Ladislaus, John and Nicholas to open new mines in Dobsina, Martonyi and Szalonna in 1474, on the condition that they were obliged to pay urbura (mining royalties) in the event of the discovery of new precious metals. John leased some mines there to local merchants in 1475. Throughout the years, John defended the Csetnekis' interests over the mines in the region against the legal claims of the Bebeks and Zápolyas. He personally supervised the transportation of mined ore to the fairs in Central Hungary too.

== Career ==
As an adult, John Csetneki entered the service of Elizabeth Szilágyi, who financially supported his education and advancement. In this capacity, he served as ispán of Bereg County and castellan of Munkács from 1474 to 1482; the area belonged to Elizabeth's royal appanage since 1461. John held both titles together with John Móré from 1474 to 1475, and, thereafter, with Ladislaus Fornosi from 1476 onwards. During his eight years of service as ispán and castellan, John received valuable gifts and treasures from his lady Elizabeth Szilágyi, including a silver-plated sword, a silver bowl, and two pearly and wild leather headgear. According to a complaint from 1489, John Csetneki and John Móré made an act of domination, abusing their positions, in 1475. John was admitted as an honorary member to the Order of Saint Paul the First Hermit in Buda in 1478 because of his frequent donations to the monastic order.

Following the death of Matthias Corvinus in 1490, John Csetneki supported the claim of John I Albert for the throne during the War of the Hungarian Succession. Alongside several other families in Upper Hungary, he joined his cause when the future Polish monarch invaded the region in the autumn of 1490. After a peace treaty with his elder brother Vladislaus II, John Albert renounced his claim to Hungary in exchange for the Duchy of Głogów and the suzerainty over half of Silesia on 20 February 1491. In the next month, Vladislaus granted pardon to the partisans of his brother, including John Csetneki, who was able to attend the Diet of Hungary in Buda as an assessor (a representative of the lower nobility) for Gömör County in the spring of 1492.

In the 1490s, John served as the king's loyalist. When the castellan of Murány (present-day Muráň, Slovakia) attacked and plundered his nearby estates in 1499, he was acting on behalf of the king somewhere else. John complained that the clash occurred as an instigation of Palatine Stephen Zápolya. The Csetnekis organized a counterattack against the Bebek family – Zápolya's allies – thereafter. Nevertheless, John had to experience the dissolution of the Csetnek lordship by the end of the 15th century, due to pressure of the powerful Zápolya family, who gradually obtained the possessions of the Bebek family too.

According to Hungarian historian József Fógel, John functioned as a royal councillor in 1503. In that year, he was engaged in commercial activities with the Jewish merchant Mendel family of Buda. As one of the four representatives of Gömör County, he participated in the Diet of Hungary in October 1505. Vladislaus II summoned him to Buda to participate in the negotiations with German king Maximilian I to conclude the Habsburg–Jagiellonian mutual-succession treaty in 1506. John was again referred to as among the councilors and jurors of the royal council in 1507.

== Personal life ==
John chiefly resided in the castle of Csetnek, which he rebuilt into a Renaissance-style fort in the last decades of the 15th century. The Csetneki brothers also had a common fortified manor and curia in the settlement. Under paterfamilias John, the tower of the local church was renovated and reconstructed sometime between 1501 and 1504; a new organ gallery and a choir bench for city council members were built too.

According to a list of revenues compiled by John sometime in the late 1490s, John had numerous material conflicts with his own brother Ladislaus, who owed his brother many estates, valuables and sums of money, and lived a lavish lifestyle. John mentioned that Ladislaus even melted down the silver sword that John had received from Elizabeth Szilágyi for his faithful service, in addition to theft of other personal belongings and the unauthorized use of their common heirdom. According to the complaint, Ladislaus appropriated the inheritance of their sister Catherine (jewelry, clothes). John also recalled that on several occasions he used his wealth to help his brother, who was involved in various losing lawsuits (including the financial compensation of Tamás Bakócz, Bishop of Eger, who threatened to excommunicate Ladislaus). Even though Ladislaus was living off his relatives' money, John helped him out of trouble time and again.

John married Hedwig from an unidentified noble family. Their marriage produced a son, Andrew (II), and two daughters, Dorothea and Catherine. Andrew was mentioned a royal bailiff in 1517. He served as vice-ispán of Gömör County between 1531 and 1533. John's two daughters, Dorothea and Catherine married brothers Ladislaus and Nicholas Lorántfi de Serke from the prestigious gens (clan) Rátót, respectively. In the autumn of 1505, John complained to Judge royal Peter Szentgyörgyi that his son-in-law Nicholas Lorántfi neglected his wife and children (i.e. John's daughter and grandsons) and his drinking and gluttony put him in a serious financial situation, thus he attempted to pledge his family estates to his brother Ladislaus. John appears in contemporary record in 1512 as a guardian of his grandson Tobias Lorántfi (a son of the late Ladislaus and Dorothea), when he attempted to buy the castle of Gede (present-day Hodejov, Slovakia) from the Lorántfis for 4,000 golden florins. After the death of her husband, Dorothea married Stephen Szentannai. His another daughter Catherine died prior to 1520.

The dying John Csetneki compiled his last will and testament in his manor at Csetnek on 12 August 1512. He left all his wealth to his only son Andrew and forgave all his debtors all their debts. He left it to his son to take care of the financial support of the church in Csetnek.

== Sources ==
- C. Tóth, Norbert; Horváth, Richárd; Neumann, Tibor; Pálosfalvi, Tamás; W. Kovács, András (2017). Magyarország világi archontológiája, 1458–1526, II. Megyék [Secular Archontology of Hungary, 1458–1526, Volume II: Counties] (in Hungarian). MTA Bölcsészettudományi Kutatóközpont Történettudományi Intézete. ISBN 978-963-4160-85-4.
- C. Tóth, Norbert (2019). "Szilágyi Erzsébet "udvara" [The "Court" of Elizabeth Szilágyi]". In Kádas, István; Skorka, Renáta; Weisz, Boglárka (eds.). Márvány, tárház, adomány. Gazdaságtörténeti tanulmányok a magyar középkorról (in Hungarian). MTA Bölcsészettudományi Kutatóközpont. pp. 51–114. ISBN 978-963-416-179-0.
- Kubinyi, András (1984). "A királyi tanács köznemesi ülnökei a Jagelló-korban [The Noble Jurors of the Royal Council in the Jagiellonian Era]". In H. Balázs, Éva; Fügedi, Erik; Maksay, Ferenc (eds.). Mályusz Elemér emlékkönyv. Társadalom- és művelődéstörténeti tanulmányok (in Hungarian). Akadémiai Kiadó. pp. 257–268. ISBN 963-05-3272-7.
- Tihányiová, Monika (2022). A Csetnekiek. Kultúrtörténeti és gazdaságtörténeti barangolások Felső-Gömörben [The Csetnekis. Cultural and Economic Historical Walking Tours in Upper Gemer] (in Hungarian). Translated by Padlovics, Ágnes. Martin Opitz Kiadó. ISBN 978-615-6388-09-4.

John IV House of Csetneki Born: 1450s Died: 1512
Political offices
Preceded by John Varjasi	Ispán of Bereg alongside John Móré (1474–1475), Ladislaus Fornosi (1476–1482); 1474–1482	Succeeded by George Verebélyi
