= Transylvanian invasion of Hungary (1644–1645) =

- Part of the Thirty Years' War
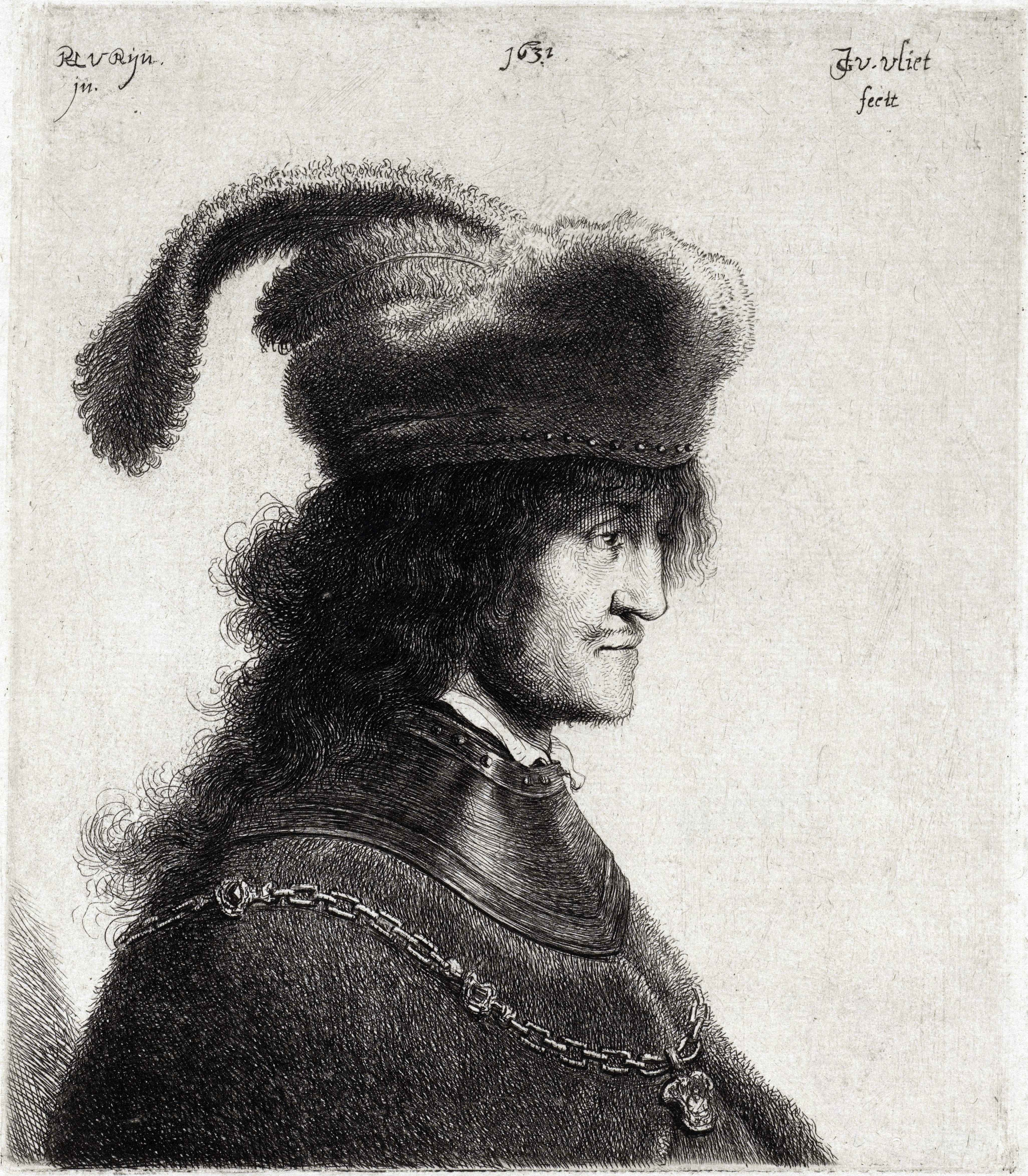
- György Rákóczi, Prince of Transylvania
Date	2 February 1644 – 22 August 1645
Location	Royal Hungary, Moravia
Result	Transylvanian victory

Belligerents
Transylvania · Estates of Upper Hungary; Swedish Empire; Vlachs Supported by: Kingdom of France; Ottoman Empire	Holy Roman Empire; Kingdom of Hungary

Commanders and leaders
(Transylvania) George I Rákóczi (Transylvania) Sigismund II Rákóczi (Transylvania) János Kemény (Transylvania) Pál Bornemissza (Transylvania) Gábor Bakos (Transylvania) György Kapronczay † (Swedish Empire) Lennart Torstensson (Swedish Empire) Robert Douglas	Ferdinand III Miklós Esterházy; Ádám Forgách; Ferenc Wesselényi (Holy Roman Empire) Archduke Leopold Wilhelm; Hans Christoph Pucheim; Johann von Götzen †; János Homonnai Drugeth

Strength
30,000 (initial)	18,000

Casualties and losses
Unknown	Unknown

The Transylvanian invasion of Hungary (1644–1645) was the intervention of George I Rákóczi into the Thirty Years War in alliance with France and Sweden. Rákóczi successfully took over parts of Upper Hungary in 1644, but Imperial counter-attacks forced him to play defense for the rest of the year. In 1645, Sweden advanced deep into Bohemia and Moravia, urging Rákóczi to resume his advance. Transylvanians successfully linked up with the Swedes at the Siege of Brno. However, due to Ottoman pressure, Rákóczi was forced to end his campaign and agree to a separate peace with the Habsburgs. Despite their mixed military performance, in the concluding Peace of Linz Transylvania received favorable concessions. The 7 counties of Hungary previously ceded to Gábor Bethlen were ceded to Transylvania once more, and the rights of Protestants in Hungary were guaranteed.

== Background ==
The Principality of Transylvania was one of the successor states to the medieval Kingdom of Hungary, initially formed in opposition to the Habsburg inheritance of the Hungarian crown. Though autonomous, the principality was under Ottoman vassalage, exerting major influence over their foreign policy. Transylvania was religiously diverse, ruled by Protestant princes. During the outbreak of the Thirty Years War, prince Gabriel Bethlen intervened on the side of the anti-Habsburg rebels multiple times, but then settled with the Habsburgs separately. In the Peace of Nikolsburg, seven counties in Upper Hungary were ceded to Transylvania for the length of Gábor's reign.

In 1630, George I Rákóczi gained the title of Prince over the brother of the deceased Gábor. Rákóczi was also a major landowner in the Hungarian counties neighboring Transylvania, making him an important political player in Royal Hungary as well.Seeking to avoid another conflict, the Habsburgs allowed him to retain these estates and recognised his title as prince.

Throughout the 1630s, there has been negotiation between Sweden, France and Transylvania to re-enter the war but these dragged on without result. Rákóczi's position was also less secure in the eye of the Ottoman Porte than Bethlen's was, making him more wary of securing Ottoman permission before committing himself to a Swedish alliance.

Victories by Bernard of Saxe-Weimar in 1638 prompted Rákóczi to dispatch his envoy Johann Heinrich Bisterfeld to Paris. French Cardinal Richelieu, through Hugo Grotius and Père Joseph, supported the idea of a Transylvanian-Swedish alliance against the Habsburgs. In July 1638, French envoy Du Bois D'Avaugour arrived in Transylvania. Rákóczi demanded Ottoman approval for his departure, protection for his realm, confirmation of his son's succession, neutralization of rival Moses Székely, annual subsidies of 220 000 thalers, and 6000 infantry during the war. Negotiations dragged until late 1639 without resolution, as Rákóczi's demands were deemed excessive. Despite this, he prepared for war by acquiring munitions: in January 1640, László Ujlaky was sent to Poland for 3000 muskets, 600 Hungarian harnesses, and 359 iron armors.

Swedish diplomacy intensified in 1642, after general Lennart Torstenson was stalled at the siege of Brieg in Sielsia. Bisterfeld negotiated reduced demands of 200,000 thalers initially, 150,000 annually thereafter, 3000 infantry and securing approval from the Porte. Though these terms were accepted, Rákóczi waited until the Swedish and French governments officially ratified them, which caused significant delay. Finally on November 16, 1643, Rákóczi signed an official military alliance with Sweden. Grand Vizier Kemankeş Kara Mustafa Pasha also gave approval for Transylvania to re-capture the 7 counties of Upper Hungary it previously held. However, on January 31, 1644, just as the campaign was launched, Kara Mustafa was dismissed and executed, leaving Ottoman support uncertain yet again.

From 1643, the Habsburg court already expected Rákczi would attack and summoned an army of the Hungarian estates led by Palatine Miklós Esterházy. However, as the country was already threatened by Swedish presence in Moravia, they were stationed far from the Transylvanian border at Szakolca (Skalica).

== Campaign of 1644 ==
=== Initial Transylvanian advance ===
On February 2, 1644, Rákóczi launched his invasion of Royal Hungary in three columns. On the right, the prince himself led the main force to Székelyhíd (Săcueni), in the middle his son Sigismund advanced to Nagykároly (Carei), and on the right János Kemény to Szatmár (Satu Mare). His army also included Hajdús and 1000-3000 Ottoman auxiliaries.

The initial stage of the invasion advanced with little resistance. This was aided by the fact that Rákóczi also garrisoned forts on his estates in Royal Hungary (mainly Munkács, Ónod, Sárospatak and Szerencs), who remained loyal to him. On 16 February, Rákóczi entered Nagykálló and issued a Manifesto, justifying his invasion by the Jesuit’s oppression of Protestants in Hungary, and accused Habsburgs of trying to turn Hungary into a hereditary domain. .

Through the next month, the counties of Zemplén, Borsod, Ung, Bereg, Ugocsa, and Abaúj pledged allegiance to Rákóczi, soon followed by Gömör, Sáros, Szepes and Torna. Kassa (Košice) was handed over without a fight by Ádám Forgách on March 11. After a long negotiation Szatmár surrendered on March 16, and the garrison defected to Rákóczi.

In late March, Transylvanians resumed their advance westwards in three columns once again. György Kapronczay advanced north into the Vág (Váh) valley with 6000 cavalry. Pál Bornemissza and Gábor Bakos to the Garam (Hron) valley mining towns. Rákóczi, along with his son and Kemény advanced in the south, putting Fülek (Fiľakovo) and Léva (Levice) under siege, establishing their headquarters at Drégelypalánk. Ferenc Wesselényi, captain of Fülek, initially declared neutrality, but soon resumed hostilities.

However, by then plans to link up with Sweden fell through, because Torstenson was recalled north to invade Jutland. This freed up Imperial troops in Moravia and Silesia to use against Rákóczi. 6000 troops under Hans Christoph Puchheim, and 8000 troops under Johann von Götzen entered Hungary, joined by 4000 troops under Esterházy.

=== Imperial counter-attack ===
Puchheim and Götzen attacked Kapronczay's camp on April 9 at Galgóc (Hlohovec). He was caught completely off guard and killed before he could assume command. His troops fled to Bornemissza's banner. Rákóczi decided not to give battle but retreat east, into the more supportive protestant-majority counties. On May 5, a rearguard of 2–3000 led by Kemény and Bakos engaged the Imperials in an indecisive battle at Drégelypalánk before withdrawing next day. Rákóczi pulled his camp all the way to the east bank of the Tisza, leaving major garrisons behind in Eperjes (Prešov), Kassa, Sárospatak, and Tokaj. On May 19 he opened up peace negotiations with Eszterházy, but he found Imperial terms unacceptable.

On April 27, Imperial forces crossed the Garam and relieved Léva, then Fülek, recaptured Szendrő and reached Szerencs on May 25. Eszterházy then marched north to besiege Kassa from June 10, defended by Orbán Reöthy, but this siege dragged on for two weeks. Meanwhile, Ferenc Toldalaghy who was left behind to hold Szerencs was defeated by Kemény on June 11, who then managed to get behind the Imperial forces around Kassa with a force of 15 000, harassing them and disrupting their supply lines. Because of this, the Imperial forces decided to retreat north to Eperjes, but Kemény intercepted and defeated them at Somos (Drienov). Eperjes, defended by Márton Harkó by 400 Székely troops, also defied the Imperials. Then Eszterházy unsuccessfully laid siege of Sárosvár (Hrad Šariš).

On June 24, Rákóczi issued another peace offer which reached Eszterházy at this siege. He agreed to a 3-day armistice, which Kemény used to successfully reinforce the fort.

Meanwhile, Puchheim and Götzen came into conflict with Eszterházy, blaming him for focusing on Kassa instead of continuing to pursue Rákóczi. The German generals urged retreat; in response, and due to his declining health, Eszterházy gave up command and returned to his estates. The Imperial forces then retreated west through Szepes, Liptó and Turóc counties to Bajmóc (Bojnice), Kemény harassing them all the way.

Through Spring 1644 János Homonnai Drugeth also gathered forces in Poland to attack Rákóczi, but he did not arrive by the time the Imperial forces expected him. His forces briefly recaptured Ungvár (Uzhhorod), but captain János Ballingh recaptured it in July, alongside two minor forts of Jeszenő (Hrad Jasenov) and Regéc. However, with Rákóczi remaining in the east, a large gap opened between him and Kemény that was further threatened when the Lady of Murány (Muráň), Mária Széchy switched sides and handed over her fortress to Wesselény on August 5.

The frustrated Kemény gave up his command and rushed to Tokaj to personally urge the prince to concentrate his forces against the enemy. While he heeded his advice, it came too late as Götzen launched his renewed advance in September on a similar path he did in May (though his forces were reduced to just 8000). He set up camp at Aszaló, and captured Szerencs where German soldiers desecrated the Rákóczi family tomb on September 27. Rákóczi marched back across the Tisza at Rakamaz, while Kemény retreated to Liszka. 1700 Hajdú cavalry led by Mihály Ibrányi retreated to Tiszalúc, where they were crushed by Imperial troops.

Rebel positions were then improved by Torstensson's resuming his campaign on the Empire. Götzen was recalled to defend Bohemia, while Puchheim was ordered to retreat to the Vág river with just 600 infantry and 400 cavalry. Meanwhile, Sigismund reinforced his father with additional troops from Transylvania. On October 5, the Imperial camp at Aszaló was abandoned to Szendrő, then pulled back from eastern Hungary altogether. Kemény pursued their retreat, but with the advent of winter no major confrontation occurred. His troops winter in Gömör és Túróc counties. Rákóczi unsuccessfully besieged Rimaszécs (Rimavská Seč), then also entered winter quarters.

The two sides opened peace negotiations from mid-September at Nagyszombat (Trnava), but both sides found terms unacceptable and no deal was reached.

== Campaign of 1645 ==
On January 29, 1645, French envoy Antoine-Fouquet de Marcilly-Croissy arrived to Zubró (Zborov) to negotiate with Rákóczi. He was alerted France was not aware of the terms Sweden agreed in their name, which made them reluctant to pay their share of the obligations. However, now France was open to make a direct alliance with Rákóczi to keep Transylvania in the war.

On February 12 Rákóczi called a council from the estates of the 12 Hungarian counties under his occupation. This council resolved in support of the French alliance. However, by then the Ottoman Porte urged Rákóczi to settle for seven counties and not to pursue further conquest. At this point, the Ottomans were preparing for their war with Venice, and wanted their Hungarian frontier stable.

Meanwhile, on March 6, Torstensson crushed the Habsburg army at Jankau, and Götzen was killed on the battlefield. Sweden urged Rákóczi to quickly march west, but he was still stalling, while unsuccessfully besieging the minor forts of Szendrő és Regéc. Only Kemény advanced a bit forward to Liptó county. This led Torstensson to abandon a direct attack on Vienna, opting to lay siege to Brno.

Finally on April 22 Rákóczi made an official alliance with France at Munkács (Mukachevo). France promised to make the Ottomans rescind their ban, and failing that it allowed Transylvania to make a separate peace with the empire. Rákóczi ordered to concentrate all his forces at Rakamaz on the Tisza river, including Kemény's vanguard in the west. Puchheim pursued him through the Vág valley, then southwards, marching all the way to Aszaló again, but avoiding direct confrontation.

Rákóczi's concentrated army began its westward campaign on May 30, through the Sajó and Rima valleys. There he once again received orders from the Porte to halt his campaign, but he continued regardless. He captured and burned Fülek, then entered Nyitra (Nitra) and Nagytapolcsány (Topoľčany). There he made first contact with the Swedish army on July 6: Robert Douglas led 1800 Swedish cavalry to join Rákóczi, as promised by the Swedish-Transylvanian alliance.

Rákóczi marched on to Nagyszombat, then sent his commanders Sigismund, Kemény and Gábor Bakos with a force of 14 000 to join the Swedish siege at Brno. Soon after he also crossed into Moravia at Hodonín and reached Ladná on July 27.

Already by July 4, the Emperor agreed to Rákóczi's peace terms. Rákóczi continued his campaign to fulfill his obligation to his protestant allies and gain at least some of the promised subsidies. However, considering his worsening position, he soon opted to accept the Habsburg offer.

The Ottomans continued to demand the end of his campaign and his son György Rákóczi reported the pasha of Temesvár (Timișoara) threatened to invade. Another Habsburg army of 15 000 under Archduke Leopold Wilhelm also gathered at Dévény (Devín), preparing to re-invade Hungary along with Puchheim. A destructive plague also broke out in Upper Hungary.

=== Peace of Linz ===
On August 22, in his camp at Ladná, Rákóczi officially denounced his Franco-Swedish alliance. This was ratified by the Emperor in Linz on December 16, which is why this arrangement is called the Peace of Linz. The 7 counties once ruled by Gabriel Bethlen (Abaúj, Zemplén, Borsod, Bereg, Ugocsa, Szabolcs, Szatmár) were returned to Transylvania once more, until Rákóczi's death. Szabolcs and Szatmár would also be allowed to remain with Transylvania under his son. The estates of the Rákóczi family were greatly expanded with Tokaj, Tarcal, Regéc, Ecsed and Nagybánya (Baia Mare). The peace also guaranteed freedom of religion for all Hungarians, including serfs.

After a failed assault on the city on August 15, Transylvanian troops were pulled back from the siege of Brno, citing the Ottoman ban as justification. This caused frustration on the Swedish side who were forced to abandon the siege soon after.

== Sources ==
- Angyal, Dávid. Magyarország története (History of Hungary), Vol. VI.
- Bánlaky, József. A magyar nemzet hadtörténelme. 24 vols. Budapest: Athenaeum, 1928–1942.
- Cseh-Szombathy, László. 1956. “I. Rákóczi György 1644-es hadjárata.” Hadtörténelmi Közlemények 3 (1): 43–76.
- Czigány, István. "The 1644–1645 Campaign of György Rákóczi I." In The Princes of Transylvania in the Thirty Years War, edited by Gábor Kármán, 86–111. Leiden: Brill, 2022.
- Wilson, Peter H. The Thirty Years War: Europe’s Tragedy. Cambridge, MA: Belknap Press of Harvard University Press, 2009.
