= Viszló =

- Village
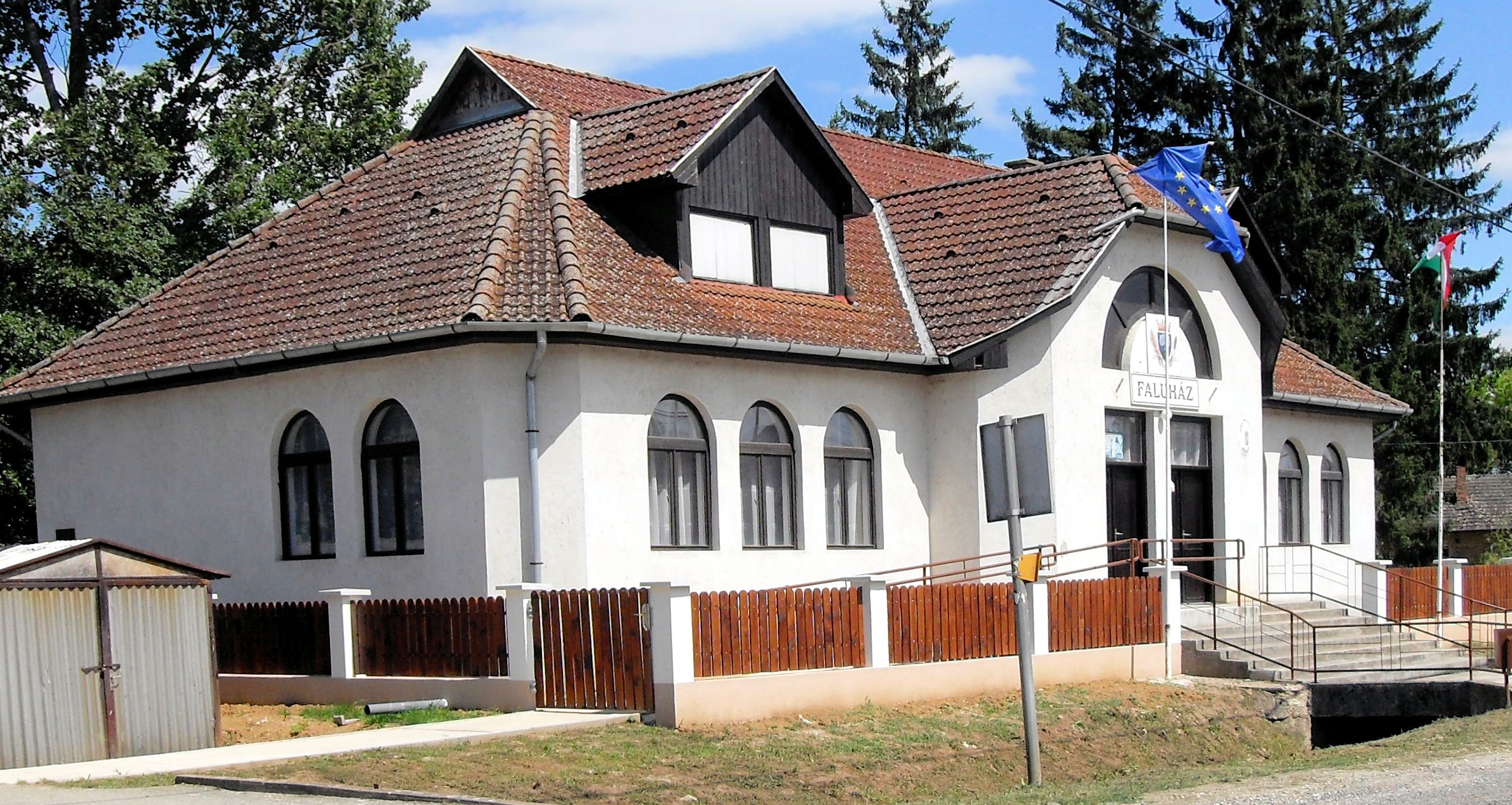

- Flag Coat of arms

- Location of Viszló
- Coordinates: 48.49286°N 20.88778°E
- Country: Hungary
- Region: Northern Hungary
- County: Borsod-Abaúj-Zemplén
- District: Edelény

Area
  - Total: 11.08 km^{2} (4.28 sq mi)

Population (1 January 2026)
  - Total: 56
  - Density: 5.1/km^{2} (13/sq mi)
- Time zone: UTC+1 (CET)
  - Summer (DST): UTC+2 (CEST)
- Postal code: 3825
- Area code: (+36) 48

Viszló (Rusyn: Віслава) is a village in Borsod-Abaúj-Zemplén County, located in northeastern Hungary.

== Etymology ==
The name comes from the Slavic personal name Vęceslavъ. 1299 Wyzlou.

== Location ==
Viszló is 70 kilometers northeast of Miskolc, 20 kilometers east by northeast of Szendrő, and 30 kilometers northeast of Edelény.

== Neighboring villages ==
- Tornaszentjakab is to the north
- Rakaca is to the south
- Rakacaszend is to the west
- Debréte is to the northwest
