= Mária Széchy =

Hungarian noblewoman, the 'Venus of Murány' (c. 1610–1678)

Countess Mária Széchy
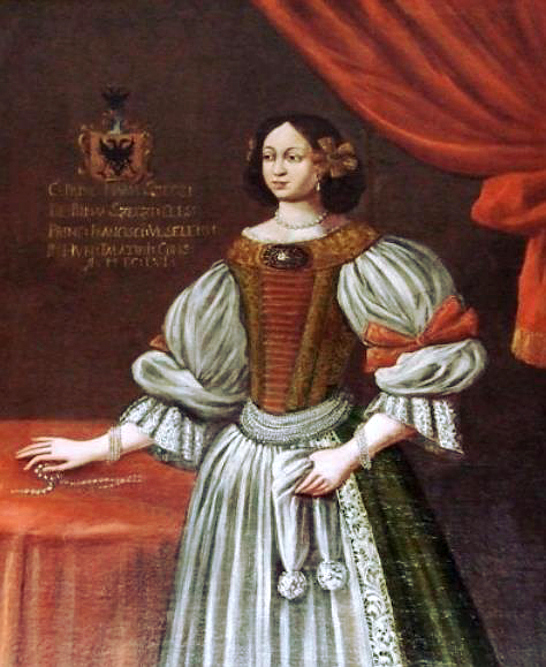
- 1556 portrait of Széchy.
- Born: around 1610; Vámosbalog, Kingdom of Hungary
- Died: 18 July 1678; Kőszeg, Kingdom of Hungary
- Burial place: Saint James' Church, Kőszeg
- Other names: Countess Bethlenné or Bethlen Istvánné (after first marriage); Countess Wesselényiné (after third marriage); Anna Mária Széchy (after conversion)
- Spouses: Count István Bethlen of Iktár (m. 1627; died 1632) István Kun of Rozsály (m. 1634; div. 1637) Count Ferenc Wesselényi (m. 1644; died 1667)
- Relatives: Miklós Zrínyi (first cousin); Ferenc III Nádasdy (first cousin once removed)
- Family: Széchy family

Anna Mária Széchy (Note: She and her contemporaries spelled her surname in various ways, including Zech, Zechi, and Zeechi; she used Szecsi most often. Széchy is the standard Hungarian spelling. (Acsády 1884, 9)) of Rimaszécs (Hungarian: rimaszécsi Széchy Anna Mária; circa 1610–1678), born Mária Széchy, was a 17th-century Hungarian noblewoman. She became one of the best-known and most influential Hungarian women of her time, famous for defending her property rights in the courts and participating in the disputes and fights between the pro-Habsburg and anti-Habsburg parties

Her main dispute was with her sisters and their husbands over Murány Castle, which they had inherited together. With the help of her third husband Ferenc Wesselényi, she secured the castle for herself. Széchy and Wesselényi took Murány for the Habsburg party: Széchy imprisoned the guards and let Wesselény's force in at night. As his wife, she became one of the most powerful women in Hungary, often representing her husband through letters or in person at the royal court and towards other nobles.

In the late 1660s, Széchy became involved in the anti-Habsburg magnate conspiracy headed by Wesselényi, but lost her leading position after her husband's 1667 death. She continued to aid the conspirators, but in 1668, she betrayed their plans to the imperial court. She was arrested in 1670 and imprisoned first in Murány, then in Pozsony and finally Vienna, while her estate was confiscated. She was only released in 1676; she spent the last two years of her life in Kőszeg.

A poem by István Gyöngyösi made her famous as the Venus of Murány (the murányi Venus). Her life became a matter of renewed interest in the 1840s, an age of Hungarian nationalism.

== Ancestry and childhood ==
The Széchys descended from the Balog lineage and were first noted as a noble family in the 13^{th} century, going on to gather extensive lands in Transdanubia, Gömör County, and Upper Hungary. Members of the family filled various high political positions, such as palatine, judge royal, bans, and főispáns. Mária Széchy was born between 1609 and 1612, probably around 1610, in Vámosbalog (today Veľký Blh, Slovakia) to György Széchy of Rimaszécs (born probably around 1579, died 1625) and his wife, Mária Homonnay (or “Drugeth” of Homonna, born probably around 1589, d. 1643). György Széchy was the eldest son of Tamás III Széchy (born in the mid-16^{th} century, d. 1618) and his first wife Borbála Perényi. At least from the time of Tamás III, the Széchy family were Lutherans. Mária Homonnay was the daughter of György II Homonnay, főispán of Ugocsa County and Fruzsina Dóczy, both dead by the time of their daughter's marriage. Her brother, György III Homonnay, would go on to become judge royal.

Mária Széchy's biographer, Ignác Acsády, characterises her father as a typical military man of the age: “bold” and “resilient” but also “selfish” and “cruel”. Thus, he succeeded in positioning himself well in an unstable period. His marriage to the rich Mária Homonnay was part of his successful navigation of the complex political situation. The marriage seems to have been happy and resulted in the birth of four sons (János, Péter, Sámuel, and György) and five daughters (Mária, Borbála, d. 1637; Magdolna, d. 1621; Kata, d. 1664; and Éva, d. 1665). All sons died and a daughter died in childhood, leaving four daughters: Mária herself, Borbála, Kata, and Éva. In 1617, György Széchy inherited Murány Castle (today in Muráň, Slovakia), an isolated and strategically unimportant stronghold.

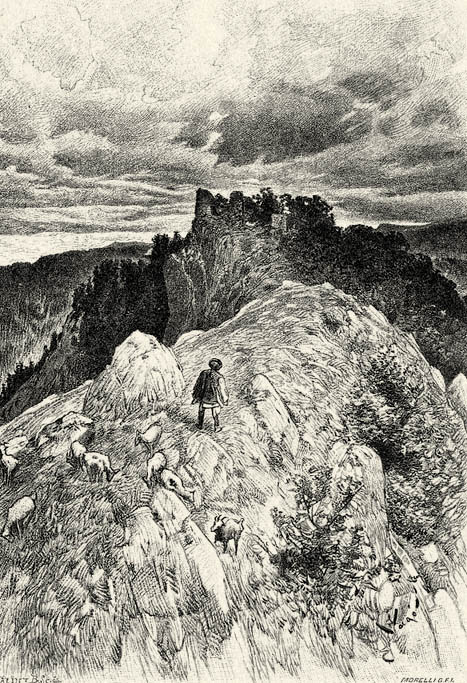
Drawing of the ruins of Murány in 1900, from the book series The Austro-Hungarian Monarchy in Writing and in Pictures.

Széchy grew up in Murány and seems to have had a close relationship with her father. She and her sisters were educated by their mother, with an emphasis on religion. The children's education was aided by the Lutheran pastor of the family. The Széchys chose educated priests interested in the sciences and literature, mostly writers themselves. Growing up around writers and poets gave Széchy her lifelong interest in poetry and music. However, the most important people to teach the girls were their mother and the four or five öregasszony. Literally “old women”, these were widowed noblewomen who helped a castle's mistress run her household. Theoretical knowledge was less important than etiquette. Széchy also learnt to ride, hunt, and fish, pursuits which she would excel at and enjoy her whole life. The children grew up in a multilingual environment, surrounded by Tót (South Slavic) servants and German soldiers. Although her mother spoke Latin, it appears that Mária Széchy was only taught Hungarian, and perhaps learnt the Tót language, as her sister Kata was able to write letters in it. As an adult Széchy signed letters and documents in Latin, German, and Tót, but there is proof that these needed to be translated into Hungarian for her.

On 28 June 1621, the family were travelling from Murány to Besztercebánya (today Banská Bystrica, Slovakia) when they were caught in a sudden storm. Lightning killed six people, including Mária's sister Magdolna.

== First marriage and life as Countess Bethlen ==
György Széchy started planning his daughter's marriage in 1625. He looked for a bridegroom from the family of his ally Gabriel Bethlen, Prince of Transylvania. During the time of the marriage negotiations, on 31 August 1625, György Széchy spent a night sleeping in a barn, probably after a hunt. His armour-bearer Miklós Léthy and other servants shot him in the head. Nothing is known of their motivation or later fate.

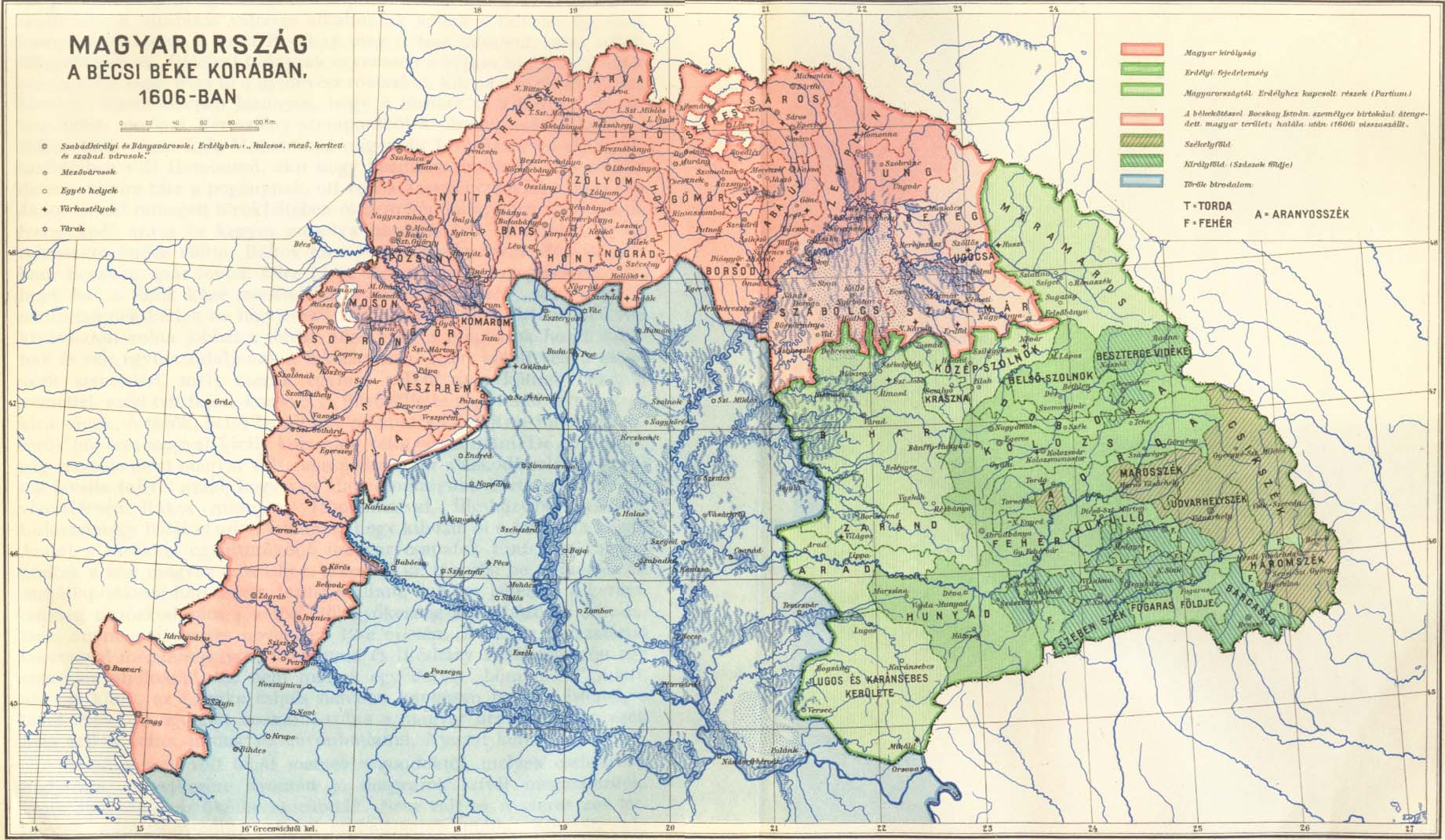
The divided Hungary in 1606; borders remained roughly similar in the next decades.

The four living Széchy daughters' (Mária, Borbála, Kata, and Éva) vast inheritance was challenged by their uncle, Dénes Széchy, as well as their father's various creditors and enemies. Mária Homonnay spent the next years safeguarding their fortune, a difficult task as their lands were scattered across all three parts of the divided kingdom (occupied Ottoman Hungary, Habsburg-ruled Royal Hungary, and a semi-independent Ottoman vassal state, the Principality of Transylvania). As opposed to her opportunist husband, Homonnay was a staunch royalist and supporter of the Habsburgs. She pleaded the protection of Emperor-King Ferdinand II and on 2 May 1626, took a written oath not to cede Murány Castle to any “foreign prince”, and especially “not to the prince of Transylvania, nor to any person belonging to” him.

Nevertheless, she continued her husband's policy of marrying Mária into the Bethlen family that ruled Transylvania. In March 1626, the bridegroom, Count István Bethlen Jr. of Iktár (today Ictar-Budinț, Romania) visited Murány. By the end of his stay, the two had certainly been betrothed. Count Bethlen, the son of Count István Bethlen of Iktár Sr. and Krisztina Csáky, was a favourite nephew of the childless Prince Bethlen. The prince raised him from the age of two and sent him to study at Heidelberg University, then on a grand tour of Europe. In 1620, he was formally adopted by his uncle. Considered the heir to Transylvania, he was endowed with many lands and castles. In contemporary sources, he is described as “very modest, temperate, with a fine mind, knowledge, and valiant courage”. His age at the time of his marriage is uncertain; he may have been born as early as 1604, but more likely around 1608. The wedding was planned for 20 October 1626, but postponed because of the ongoing wars of Prince Bethlen and because Mária Homonnay tried to bargain on the dowry. Her husband had promised an exceptional sum because of the standing and wealth of the bridegroom, but Homonnay argued that his station had since diminished: he was no longer the heir to Transylvania, replaced by his uncle's second wife Catherine of Brandenburg. Prince Betlen refused to accept a lower dowry, and, with Homonnay acquiescing, the wedding was held on 30 May 1627.

Széchy's rich dowry contained jewellery and clothes from Bratislava and Vienna. Many of her jewels originated in Stephen Bocskay's collection. The seven counties of Transylvania all sent tributes to the wedding feast. Homonnay invited the Habsburg emperor-king, Ferdinand II and the palatine, Miklós Esterházy (who both sent envoys) as well as the aristocracy of Hungary and Transylvania and representatives of neighbouring counties and royal free cities. The wedding was celebrated in the chapel of the Széchys's Jolsva (today Jelšava, Slovakia) castle and followed by days of feasting in Murány Castle. A week later, the couple travelled to Transylvania accompanied by many of their guests; they were received with celebrations along the way.

Széchy arrived in her new home, Gyulafehérvár (today Alba Iulia, Romania), on 18 June 1627. She became a prominent lady in the princely court. Although the young couple spent most of their time on their countryside estates, they participated in the lively entertainments of Princess Catherine of Brandenburg, especially during the first winter of their marriage. Széchy's first marriage appears to have been happy; the spouses treated each other with love and care, and Count Bethlen often listened to his wife's advice. Count Bethlen struggled with drinking too much, but he was able to stay sober when in his wife's company. Mária Homonnay sent instructions to her daughter and son-in-law, who deferred to her and honoured her.

In 1628, Széchy gave birth to her first child, a daughter named Krisztina. They were both often sick with a fever over the next two years. Following the death of Prince Bethlen, Transylvania experienced political turmoil, so Széchy and her daughter stayed in the family seat of Nagyecsed for their protection. In the summer of 1631, Krisztina, not yet three, died of a childhood illness, and was buried with great ceremony. During 1632, Széchy probably had a second child who died in infancy. Around Christmas 1632, her husband also died. The cause was possibly a pubic lice infestation or another unknown illness, of which he might have been suffering since 1630.

=== Legal battles with the Bethlens and second marriage ===
As soon as her husband died, Széchy's father-in-law, István Bethlen Sr. and her brother-in-law, Péter Bethlen, arrived at Nagyecsed. Citing the lack of surviving children, they deprived Széchy of inheritance she was lawfully due. Széchy's mother sent her chief lawyers and advisers, but they were helpless against the politically powerful men. The Bethlens hastened negotiations to prevent Széchy from finding supporters in the princely court. On 1 March 1633, Széchy unconditionally relinquished Nagyecsed and its surrounding estates, but kept Vajdahunyad, Déva, and Bábolna (today Hunedoara, Deva, and Bobâlna, Romania). Upon her remarriage, she would give Vajdahunyad and Bábolna back, too, and Déva was only hers for life (so her future children from other marriages could not inherit it). She only retained ownership of an estate in Tasnád and a house in Nagyvárad (today Tășnad and Oradea, Romania) which had been bought with money from her dowry. Széchy retired to Déva. On 14 March 1634, she went to the cathedral chapter of Gyulafehérvár to declare the contract null and invalid. She alleged that she had been coerced into an unfair agreement while being in distress following her husband's death and asked to keep Vajdahunyad and Bábolna even if she remarried. Her legal issues may have influenced her decision to find a second husband who could support her in court.

By November 1634, Széchy had married István Kun of Rozsály. The costs of the wedding were advanced by Széchy, by far the wealthier of the two. The Kun family were wealthy and prominent in Szatmár County, but not as politically eminent as the Bethlens. Acsády describes Kun as a “decent but very ordinary” person, whose intellectual abilities did not match those of Széchy. This marriage appears to have been unhappy from the start and the characters of the spouses were incompatible. Neither Széchy's ambitions nor her intellectual curiosity were satisfied. She complained to Prince George II Rákóczi and Princess Zsuzsanna Lorántffy, who unsuccessfully tried to mediate between the spouses.

Széchy was disappointed because her husband did not help in her legal battles with the Bethlens. She appeared alone at every stage of the process, negotiating and trying to gain Prince Rákóczi's support. On 15 March 1635, a new settlement was made in Rákóczi's presence, who claimed Bábolna as a mediationfee. Széchy ceded Vajdahunyad to the Bethlens and again kept only Déva. While the agreement was being carried out, the Bethlens sued again. Just as Széchy was moving out of Vajdahunyad, her father-in-law revolted against Rákóczi. After the prince and the Bethlens reconciled in December 1636, Rákóczi supported their claim against Széchy. She finally ceded Vajdahunyad but re-established cordial relations with her former in-laws.

Throughout her second marriage, Széchy preferred living on her Transylvanian estates and gradually moved all of her possessions there. After late 1636, she never returned to the family home in Rozsály but lived a luxurious life in Transylvania, indulging in the entertainments she had missed in Szatmár. After he repeatedly failed to recall his wife, Kun took soldiers to kidnap her from Déva. Széchy fled to the castle, attacking the men with old cannons. Kun raided and destroyed her manor house outside the castle, causing significant damage, then left during the next night. The divorce proceedings started immediately afterwards, and although other people continued to refer to her by as Kun Istvánné (“wife of István Kun”), she reverted to using either Mária Széchy or Bethlen Istvánné (“wife of István Bethlen”).

=== Life in Tasnád and Murány ===
After her brief second marriage, Széchy lived an active life managing her estates. In late November 1637, she was noted to have ridden to a nearby town on horseback, dressed in men's clothing, equipped with two pistols, and accompanied only by men, perhaps because she feared another attack by her husband. She expressed an interest in agriculture. She purchased expensive clothing, jewellery, and furniture, but also gave donations to poor students and hospitals. She travelled frequently to Nagyvárad and attended the grape harvest festival yearly in the region where she herself owned grape hills. As a result, she always spent more than she could afford and often had to mortgage her jewellery or sell land. In November 1640, she sold Déva and moved to Tasnád. A local man sued Széchy, claiming that his father had been unlawfully deprived of Tasnád, a lawsuit that lasted for years; she herself started numerous suits against her ex-husband and others. Like most 17^{th}-century Hungarian nobles, she was involved in near-constant litigation. In spring 1640, she visited Murány to bring legal and financial advisers to Tasnád for this suit. In general, she spent a part of every year, especially winters, with her mother, where she could also see her sisters and their families. Some of her domestic staff, such as her cook, were from Murány as well.

Mária Homonnay demanded absolute obedience from her daughters, which lead to conflicts. She repeatedly chastised Széchy for living wastefully and made a will that left more wealth to her other two living daughters, Kata and Éva (Borbála had died childless in 1637). Homonnay demanded that her daughter sign her inheritance away and imprisoned her in Murány in 1641 when she was unwilling. Immediately upon her release released, Széchy declared the document she had signed to have been coerced and invalid, then travelled to judge royal Count János Homonnay to officially claim the same. At the same time, she protested against any future will her mother would make that disadvantaged her.

By winter 1641, mother and daughter had reconciled. Still suspicious, Széchy continued to safeguard her inheritance by pleading the king's protection and the support of relatives. Eventually, when Mária Homonnay died on 28 May 1643, her will divided the paternal inheritance equally between her three daughters, but left less of her own estate to Mária than to her sisters. On 21 July, Széchy was installed in Murány Castle and its estates, which she inherited with Kata and Éva. She then persuaded her sisters to make her an equal co-heir in the maternal inheritance.

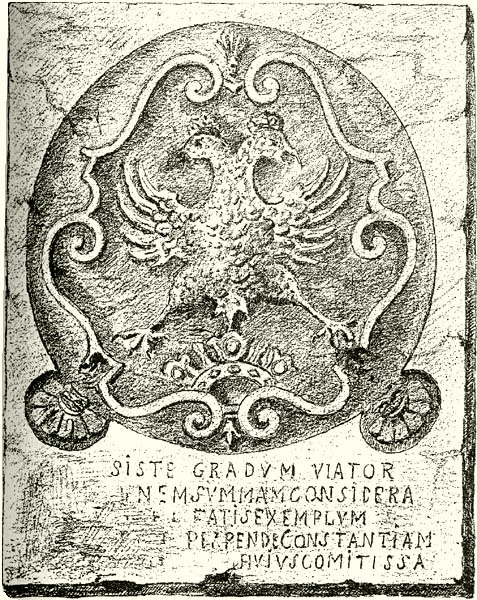
Széchy's coat of arms in Murány Castle on a drawing.

Managing the Murány estate together with her two brothers-in-law (the husband of Kata Széchy, János Listius and the husband of Éva Széchy, Count Gábor Illésházy) proved difficult. The two families moved to Murány in late 1643. The solution of dividing the inheritance (so that each land would only belong to one child) seems to have originated with Illésházy, an enterprising and ambitious young man. He wanted to keep Murány for himself and give Enyicke (today Haniska, Slovakia) to Mária Széchy. His plans were furthered when Prince George II Rákóczi of Transylvania attacked Royal Hungary. Illésházy joined Rákóczi, hoping be rewarded with Murány. Mária Homonnay's will had ordered her heirs not to ever let the prince of Transylvania seize Murány and Mária Széchy's interests aligned more with the Habsburg party, making her a royalist in the conflict.

Széchy, who had been staying in Tasnád, moved to Murány for her safety during the war. The castle was under Illésházy's command, who had Hungarian and German mercenaries. In March 1644, Széchy's sisters and brothers-in-law entered into a secret pact of protection and loyalty to each other and simply ignoring Mária Széchy's rights. Listius probably hoped to ensure his own portion of the Széchy inheritance through the powerful Illésházy's favour.

== The Murány conspiracy ==
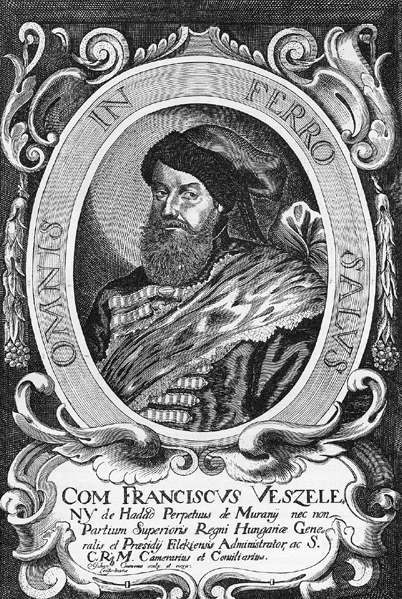
Portrait of Ferenc Wesselényi.

Széchy soon understood that her family were conspiring against her. She had few backers in Murány and she could not count on royal support because the Viennese government considered all three owners of Murány equally guilty of treason. During this time, she received a secret message from Ferenc Wesselényi, captain of Fülek Castle (today Fiľakovo, Slovakia). Although Wesseléni and Széch had not met before, the prominent Wesselényi family were friends of Széchy's late mother. Ferenc Wesselényi, considered one of the most attractive men of his generation, had been given a thorough education in military pursuits, science, and arts. He was a resolute Catholic like his entire family. He had been widowed in April 1644 by the death of his first wife Zsófia Bosnyák, and left with two young sons. The couple had treated each other respectfully but were not happy: Bosnyák was serious, pious, and sickly, while Wesselényi preferred loud entertainment, often leaving his wife for extended periods to drink and court other women.

Wesselényi decided to take Murány as a way of gaining favour in the Viennese court. He sent a secret letter to Széchy by a peasant who was taking produce into Murány Castle. Széchy started an exchange with him. Wesselényi was probably already considering marriage to her at this time. In July 1644, Széchy secretly left the castle to see Wesselényi. She agreed to help him take Murány for the emperor-king, and the two became engaged. They organised the attack on Murány for a time when Illésházy would be away.

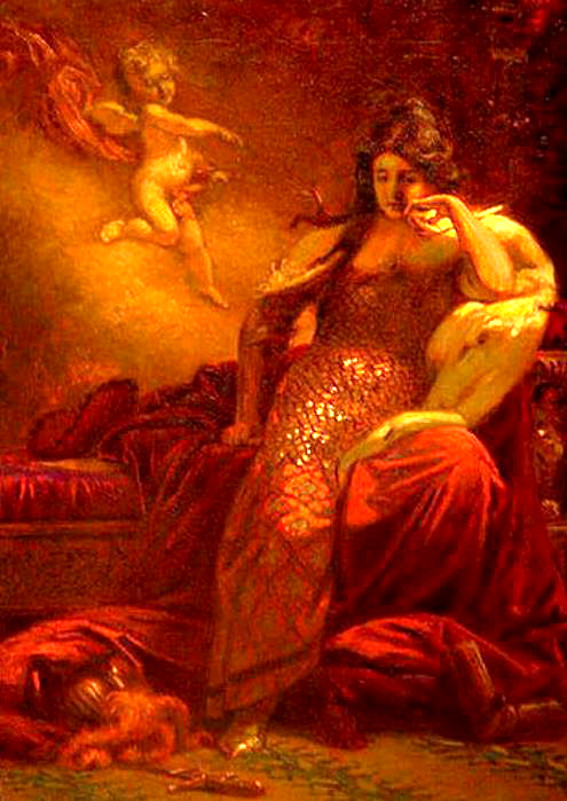
Bertalan Székely's A murányi Vénusz, painted in 1877–1878.

Széchy played a decisive role in the royalist occupation of Murány on 5 August 1644. She hid a ladder outside the castle walls for Wesselényi and his followers and waited for them on top of the wall. After everyone had gone to sleep, she and her servants captured and imprisoned the guards so they could not raise the alarm. She then helped Wesselényi and his men climb into the castle. By the time people started waking up, all officers had been captured. After obtaining the key from Éva Széchy, the conspirators opened the gates to Wesselényi's army. Three days later, on Sunday 7 August, Széchy and Wesselényi were married by a Lutheran pastor, as no Catholic priest could be found.

Széchy then summoned the captains of the family's two other fortresses, Lipcse and Vámosbalog, who were forced to swear loyalty to the Habsburg emperor-king. Éva Széchy was sent to Trencsén (today Trenčín, Slovakia), the seat of her husband's family. Éva notified Illésházy, painting her sister's role as darkly as possible. Contemporaries started rumouring that Mária Széchy had had a long affair with Wesselényi, even before his first wife's death. Chroniclers and travellers spread exaggerated stories of Széchy's bravery or treachery (depending on their own political persuasion), which later served as the basis of her role in Hungarian art. Prince Rákóczi himself, like most contemporaries, considered the affair a family conflict, not a political one.

== Third marriage and life as Countess Wesselényi ==
The Viennese court appreciated the couple's service. Emperor-King Ferdinand III thanked Wesselényi in a letter, while his wife, Maria Anna of Spain, wrote to Széchy and sent her a horse with expensive equipment. In 1647, Ferdinand bestowed on her the right to dispose of her estates in her will however she desired, lauding her bravery at Murány.

Széchy's third marriage, based on mutual sympathy, was happy and harmonius. The spouses both liked feasting, music, and receiving guests. Wesselényi gave Széchy the nicknames “Miczikém” (“my Miczi”, a diminutive of Mária) and “én asszonykám” (“my little wife”), praised her skills in managing their household, and complained how difficult it was to be far from his “beloved wife, [his] very dear nurse and keeper”. In Latin, he called her his “charissima, dulcissima” (“dearest, sweetest”) wife or “vitæ meæ comite”, (“companion of my life”). He seems to have considered her his equal and a partner in politics, making her one of the most influential Hungarian women of the time. She supervised the education of her step-sons, Ádám and László Wesselényi. In 1654, Ádám married one of Széchy's relatives, Borbála Homonnay, but he died in early 1656.

After many lengthy theological discussions with her husband, Széchy converted to Catholicism in 1645, adopting the name Anna in addition to Mária. Her conversion raised legal issues. The Protestant faction, for whom the apostasy of such a prominent noblewoman was a painful political loss, challenged the validity of her third marriage. Although Széchy had divorced her second husband, he was still alive. While Protestants could divorce and remarry, Catholics could only separate and not remarry as long as their first spouse lived. The Wesselényis turned to the church court of György Lippay, Archbishop of Esztergom (who supported them). Lippay asked the counsel of scholars at the universities of Nagyszombat (today Trnava, Slovakia) Graz, and Vienna, as well as John de Lugo. On 29 March 1645, he officially declared the marriage of Széchy and Wesselényi legal, arguing that her marriage to István Kun had been null and void. The next challenge was that Széchy and Wesselényi were related in the third degree, an impediment to their marriage in Catholic canon law. They received papal dispensation for this.

Over the years, the couple bought much of the Széchy estate from relatives. Every land they acquired became shared property and they both signed all documents pertaining to them. Because of the costs of official representation at political functions and their love of expensive clothing, jewellery, and entertainments, they were perpetually indebted. When loans could not cover their expenditure, Széchy mortgaged her jewellery. During the diet of 1659, she had to borrow silverware for a dinner as her own was mortgaged. They borrowed money from archpriests, aristocrats, friends, and charitable foundations, and goods from merchants. Acsády argues that their constant financial problems were the sign of a transitionary age, when land and agricultural produce could no longer cover a politically active family's expenses, but sufficient cash was not yet available either. Wesselényi rarely received his or his retinue's salary from the underfunded state treasury. He had to pay advances to his retinue to keep them in his employment, complaining that “great wealth makes [one] a beggar in public service”.

Wesselényi was often sick and Széchy nursed her diligently. She herself suffered from many illnesses and developed practical medical knowledge, making medications for herself and her husband when doctors were unavailable, evidenced by her letters ordering ingredients. She took care of her friends, household, and servants, sending wedding gifts and medicine. Just like her mother and her husband, she permitted her retinue and servants to choose their own denomination, but she made donations to Catholic monastic orders, especially the Franciscans.

In 1666, Wesselényi wrote his first will, naming Széchy as his sole heir. His only living son, László, brought a legal challenge, then fled to Poland. Later, it seems that the relationship between Széchy and László Wesselényi became cordial, as he entrusted his wife's care to her in his own will.

=== Legal battles over Murány ===
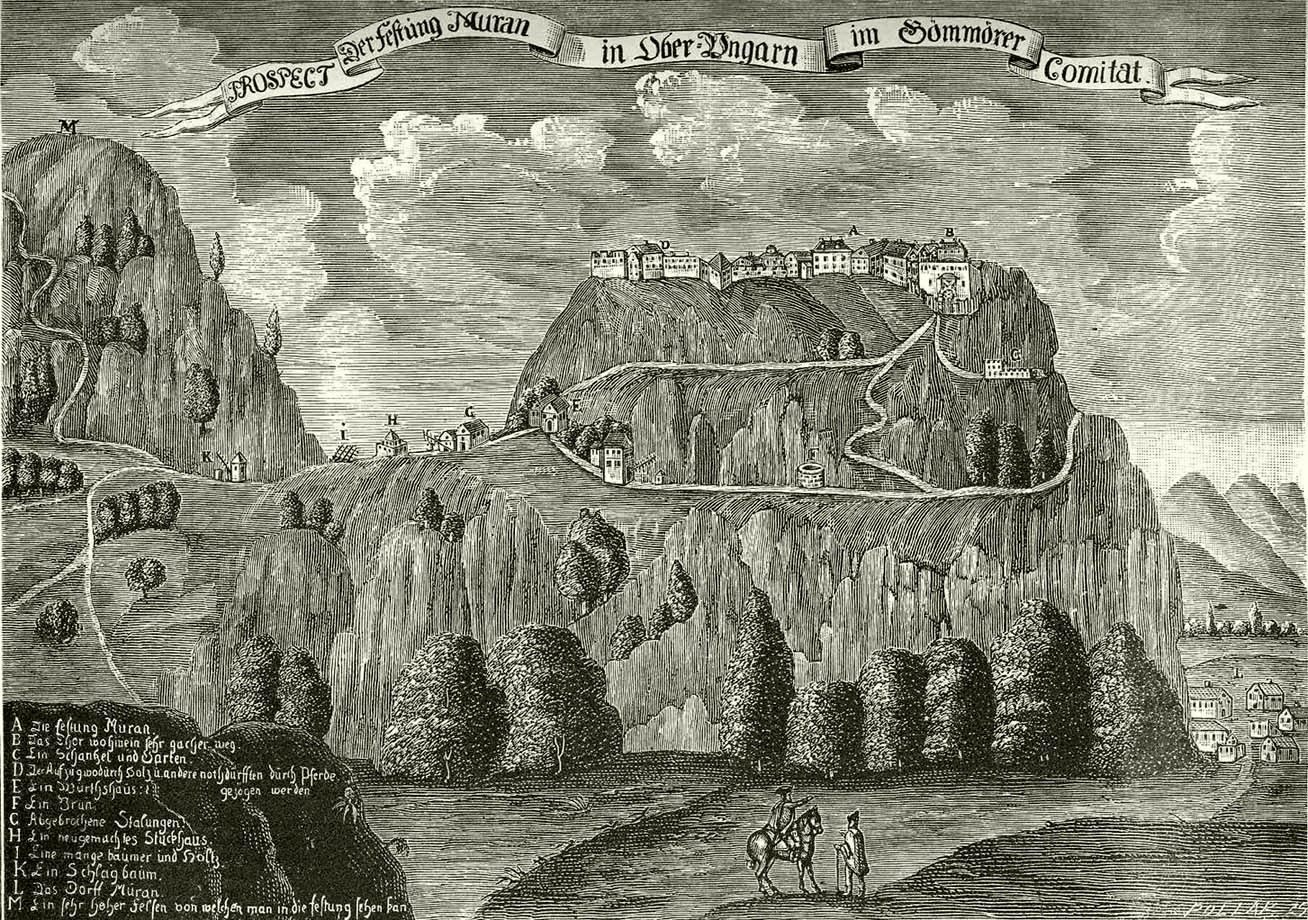
Murány Castle in the 17th century.

The diverging political loyalties of the Széchy family complicated the fate of Murány, leading to a years-long legal battle. Wesselényi claimed Murány for himself and his wife as spoils of war. He seized the gold and silver of the Illésházys to cover the wages of his mercenaries; in response, Illésházy persuaded Prince Rákóczi to seize Mária Széchy's Tasnád manor. Széchy's uncle, Count Dávid Széchy, as self-appointed head of the family, claimed and seized Vámosbalog Castle. In November 1644, Wesselényi persuaded Illésházy to support the emperor-king, but he soon returned to Rákóczi's camp. This put her at odds with the Listius family.

Both the Wesselényis and the Illésházys had supporters in Vienna, and the conflict was mediated by Archbishop Lippay. Wesselényi offered to buy his brothers-in-law out. Following the Treaty of Linz on 18 September 1645 between Emperor-King Ferdinand and Prince Rákóczi, both treated Murány as a principal contention, making the family feud into a national political matter. In 1646, Emperor-King Ferdinand created Wesselényi, his sons, and their heirs counts of Murány. Széchy continued to play an important role in the lawsuits, writing petitions. In 1648, first János Listius then György Illésházy agreed to exchange their portion of Murány for other estates. The matter was finally settled after years of legal battles on 12 February 1650, with a new royal charter confirming Wesselényi's and Széchy's holdings.

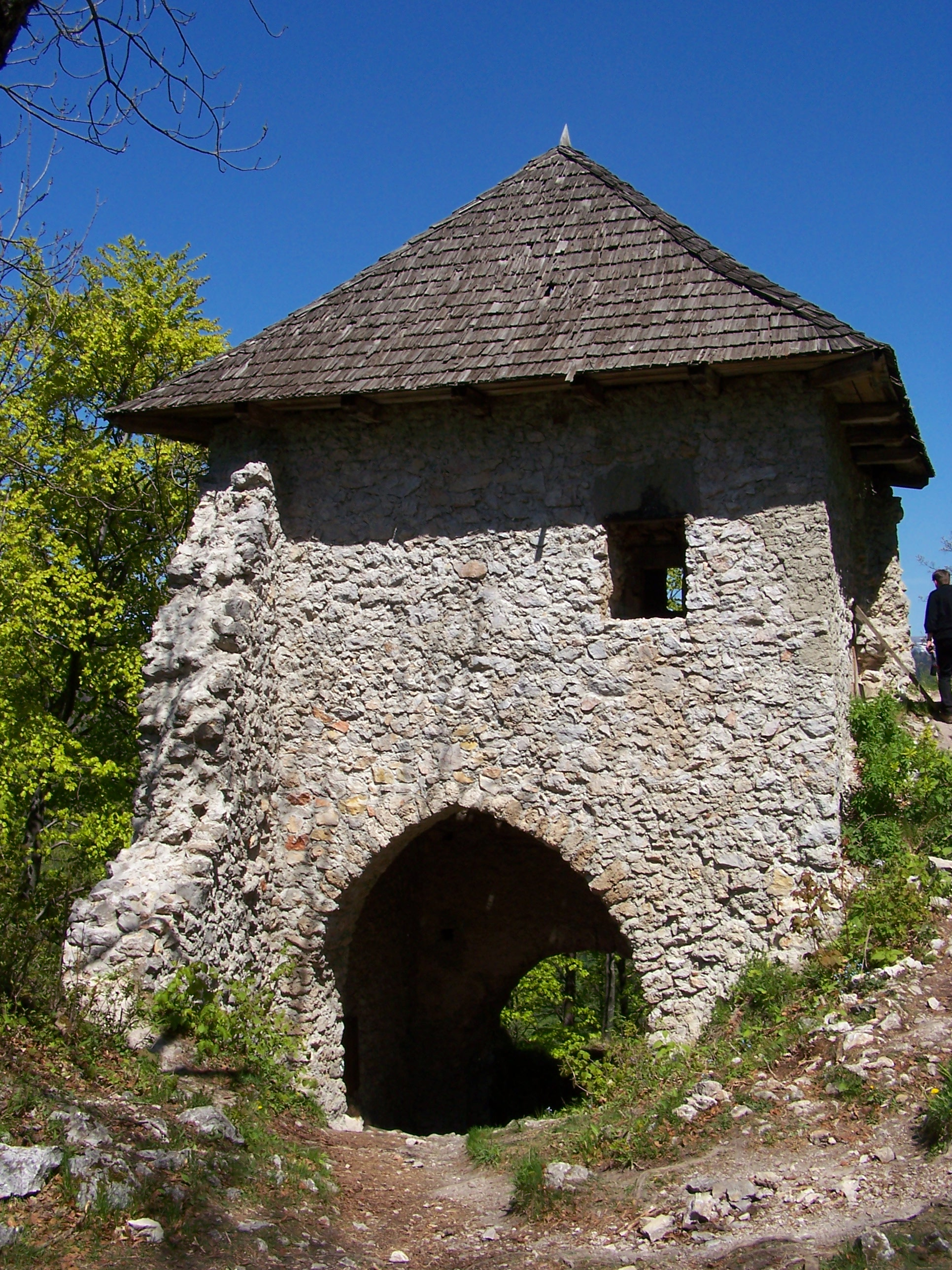
Remains of the gate of Murány Castle.

=== Public role ===
During her third marriage, Mária Széchy was considered an exemplary and courageous woman by her contemporaries, despite rumours by her political enemies. Some contemporaries considered Széchy more clever and capable than Wesselényi. She was often sent as an envoy to the king or to persuade other powerful people to support Wesselényi's causes, who relied on her negotiating skills in writing and speech.

As Wesselényi's wife, Széchy was expected to manage their household (a small court including young men in military and administrative training) and represent the family publicly. It was her job to gather useful friends and supporters to the house and make them feel welcome. Wherever the couple lived, their home became a centre of social life. Széchy's base remained Murány, but she travelled often to other estates. After Wesselényi was made general of Upper Hungary, they briefly established their court in Eperjes, then in 1648 in Kassa (today Košice, Slovakia).

On 15 March 1655, Wesselényi was elected palatine of Hungary, becoming second man after the emperor-king. This increased Széchy's standing and responsibilities; she now often travelled to Pozsony (today Bratislava, Slovakia) and Vienna, where she visited the imperial court. As the emperor-king of Hungary lived in Vienna, it was the palatine's responsibility to represent the state directly to its subjects. The couple purchased a house in Pozsony.

=== Role in literature ===
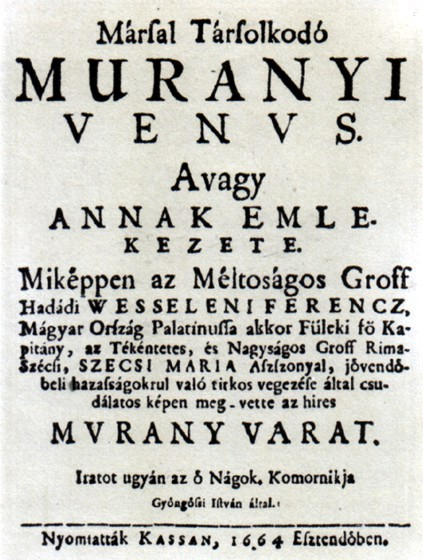
First edition of Marssal társalkodó murányi Venus (with contemporary spelling: Márſal Tárſolkodó Muranyi Venvs), printed in 1664 in Kassa (today Košice, Slovakia).

A trusted member of the Wesselényi retinue was the poet István Gyöngyösi, first as a secretary then as a captain. In 1664, he published an epic narrative poem on the conquest of Murány and the marriage of Széchy and Wesselényi. Titled Márssal társalkodó murányi Venus ('The Venus of Murány Conversing with Mars'), it made both the poet and Széchy, famous. After its 1702 republication, the poem became a bestseller in Hungary. Széchy herself wrote poems influenced by the style of Bálint Balassi, which have been lost, and she was friends with her famous poet cousin, Miklós Zrínyi (son of her father's half-sister Magdolna Erzsébet Széchy and György Zrínyi).

Letters written by her have been found in almost every noble family's archive, attesting to her widespread networks. Whereas her mother had dictated all of her letters, Széchy wrote intimate ones herself. She read the scientific, literary, and theological books of the age and funded the publishing of five books. Among others, she republished Péter Pázmány's Hungarian translation of The Imitation of Christ by Thomas à Kempis and Pázmány's own prayer book. She commissioned Hungarian artists to make original illustrations for them. She also liked music, and it is known that the tambourine and later the guitar were played in Murány.

== Role in the magnate conspiracy and widowhood ==
The second half of the 17th century was turbulent in Hungary. Ottoman occupation had devastated the population and the economy; Catholics and Protestants (the latter being the majority, but the former being the king's religion) were in constant conflict. Following the Thirty Years' War, royal power was strengthened in Europe, so the Habsburgs decided to decrease the political privileges of the Hungarian nobility. In 1663, Wesselényi called people to arms against the Ottomans. The army was gathering slowly despite his speeches and treaths, and in the meantime, the Viennese court signed the Peace of Vasvár in 1664, seen as disgraceful by Hungarians. Wesselényi was caught between the court and the nobility, and, as he could not reconcile them, he decided to head the magnate conspiracy.

Széchy's main task was to keep her tired, ailing husband on the side of the rebels and to facilitate communications. She relayed letters and organised personal meetings. In autumn 1666, the Wesselényis went to Vienna for the wedding of Leopold I and Margaret Theresa of Spain. There, Széchy made a pact of mutual support with her cousin Ferenc III Nádasdy, who had been her husband' enemy and spread rumours about her to undermine him.

Wesselényi had been ill since early 1666, but briefly recovered. On 31 January 1667, he suffered from attacks of asphyxiation. At the end of February, he was feeling better and worked with his wife on the conspiracy. On 14 March, he signed his will, naming Széchy as his sole heir, placing his son László under a curse in case he “hurt [her] under any pretense”. The revolting nobles convened in the Wesselényi house in Besztercebánya (today Banská Bystrica, Slovakia), where their meetings were led by Széchy in place of her bedridden husband.

On 27 March 1667, Ferenc Wesselényi died. Széchy arranged a simple funeral according to his wishes. As the Viennese court had not yet learnt of the conspiracy, Emperor-King Leopold assured Széchy of his protection and ordered courts to postpone any lawsuits against the Wesselényi estate for three years. After her husband died, as a woman, Széchy could no longer take a leading role in the conspiracy. However, because she was planning to sell her lands to leaders of the conspiracy, she could not sever her ties either. She continued to provide them with her network and host their meetings.

=== After her husband's death ===
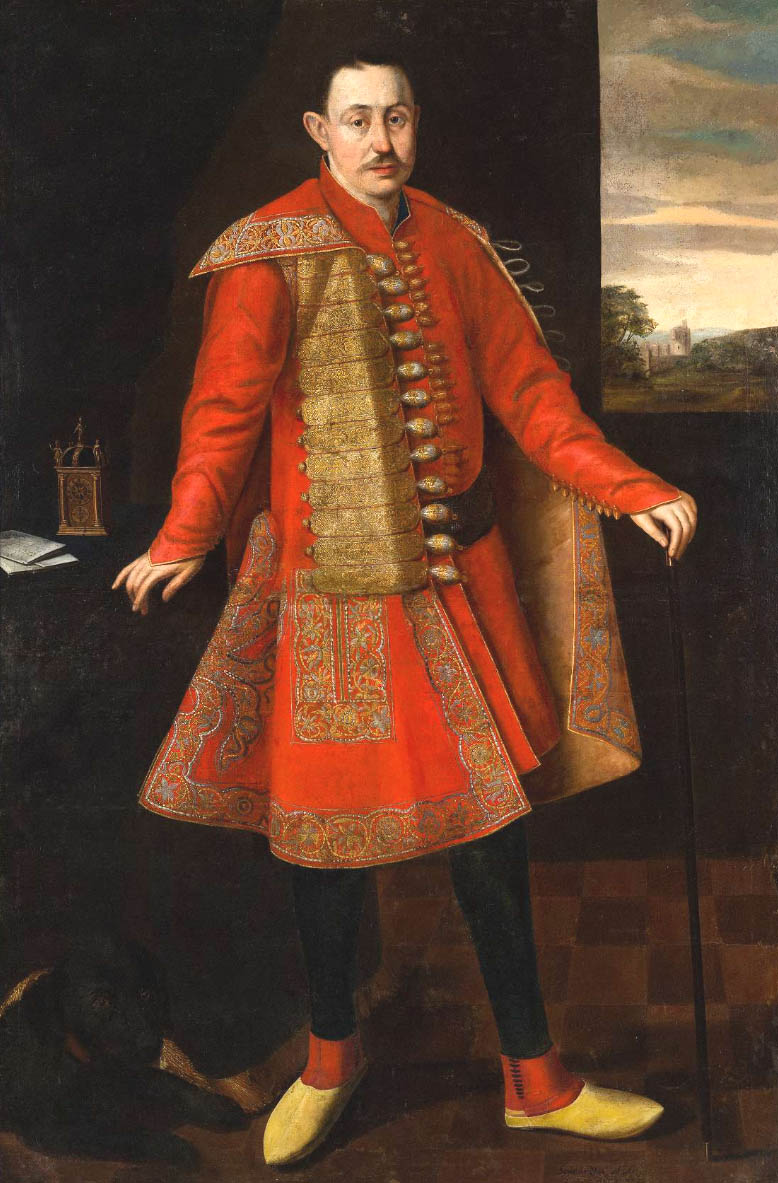
Ferenc III Nádasdy, Széchy's cousin and co-conspirator.

Her husband's death left Széchy in a difficult position, especially financially. By the standards of the age, she was elderly, nearing sixty. She had no family support and had to guide her step-son László Wesselényi, who had difficulty managing his own affairs. Hoping to build a supportive network, Széchy tried to strengthen her relationship with one of her cousins, György Széchy. She obtained political positions for him, but he did not have the necessary skills to help her. Her sisters had both died (Kata in 1664, Éva in 1665) and left one child each. Éva Széchy's daughter Kata Illésházy showed love and sympathy to her aunt, but she was not in a position to help her. Kata Széchy's son Baron János Listius Jr. was one of the Wesselényis' creditors, and as soon as her husband died, he started demanding money from his aunt. For three years, until the debt was repaid, he “inspired terror” in Széchy according to her letters.

Her troubles and loneliness made Széchy bitter. “My god does not want that any part of any worldly thing should be to my pleasure. Wherever I could hope for consolation for myself, everywhere sorrow is given in its place”, she wrote, or elsewhere: “God and my poor soul know how many various torments I am in even now, and what troubles they cause me, [so many] that I know [that] my soul shall go out [of me]”. Her health had been poor since at least 1649 (when she suffered prolonged gastric issues and repeated “swelling of the liver”), but deteriorated following her husband's death. She had a continuous headache and felt weak. She used a “soup cure”, which did not help.

She nevertheless continued to travel around her estates and tried to manage them with the help of Ferenc Lessenyei Nagy, an old member of the household who increasingly controlled her affairs. Because of her frequent illness, the estates were mismanaged. Her financial situation worsened, and now she could only get loans if she mortgaged her gold and silver. In April 1669, she secured a large grant from the royal court to settle her most urgent debts and started selling her estates. She negotiated a high price for Murány, but the emperor-king barred her from selling it.

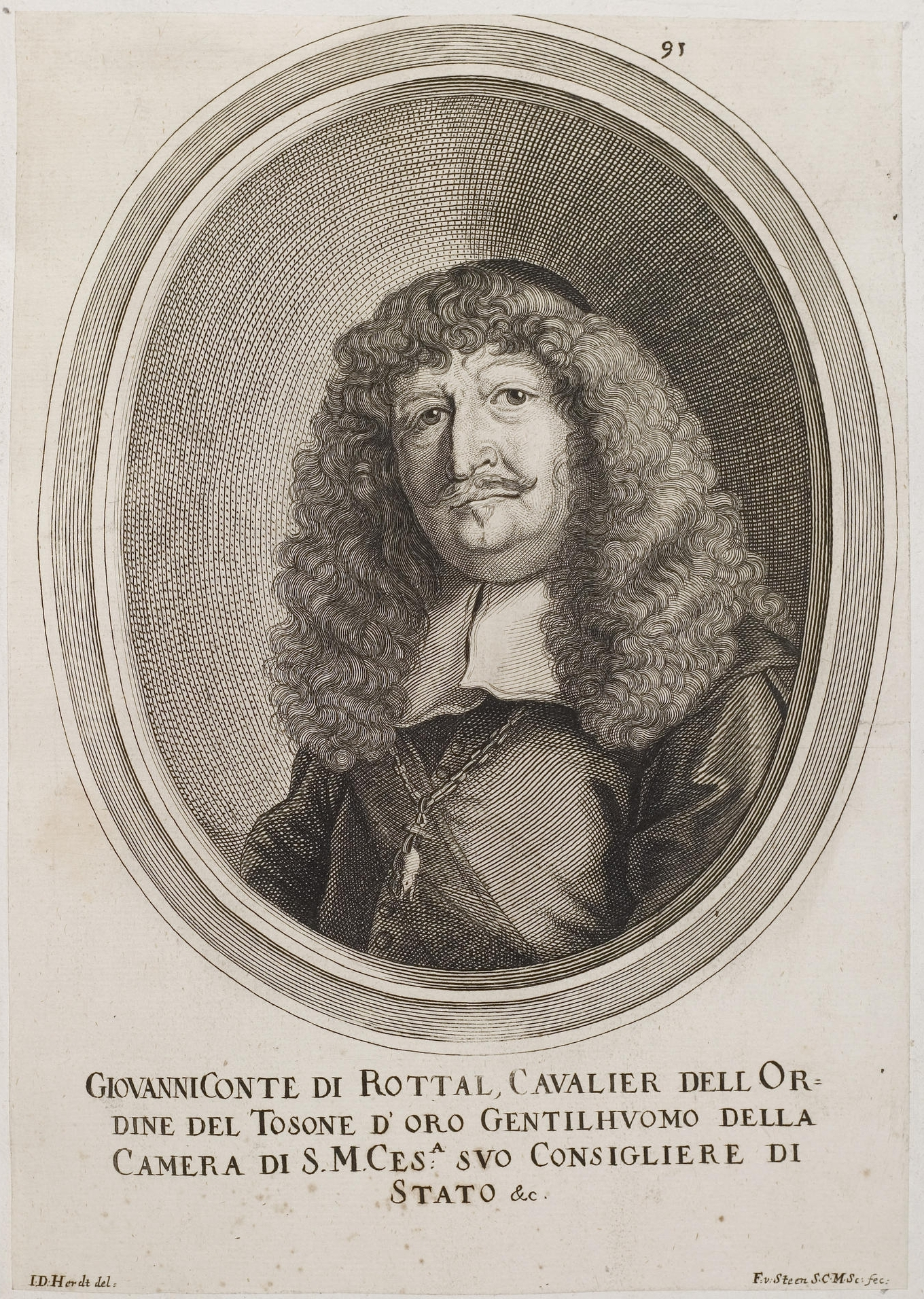
Count Johann von Rottal

Towards the end of 1668, Széchy decided to denounce the magnate conspiracy to the imperial court, probably in a bid to extricate herself from the conflict-ridden and dangerous conspiracy without adverse consequences. With the knowledge of Ferenc Nagy, Széchy and her cousin and co-conspirator Péter Zrínyi sent another conspirator, Mihály Bory to an imperial officer, Count Johann von Rottal. The government had already heard reports of a conspiracy and at least two members of the movement (including Ferenc III Nádasdy) had betrayed its plans. However, as a crucial connection between conspirators, in possession of a collection of their letters and papers, Széchy could cause significant harm to them. Rottal started investigations and asked Széchy to travel to Pozsony, where she arrived at the end of the year. She was gravely ill for at least the next two years, often unable to read documents and letters, and thus Ferenc Nagy completely dominated her affairs. She gave him blank sheets with her signature so he could arrange necessary paperwork during her illness, and used these sheets for unapproved communications. The conspirators continued using Murány as their centre, often without Széchy's knowledge.

=== Imprisonment ===
In spring 1670, armed uprisings started across the country. On 30 April 1670, Emperor-King Leopold ordered an imperial guard to be established in Murány at the same time as the Upper Hungarian counties were to be occupied. On 25 July, he forbade Széchy from contacting the rebels and ordered her to surrender the conspirators taking shelter with her, including her chief advisor Ferenc Nagy. Széchy debated with her priest whether armed resistance against her sovereign was justified. Deciding that it was, she prepared for a siege. On 6 August, sixty imperial cavalrymen arrived in Murány. Széchy pleaded with their commander for three days, who treated her roughly and threateningly. She sent envoys to Vienna to plead with the Emperor-King and his advisers. She reminded them of her former services, swore loyalty, promised to sign any document or cede Murány in exchange for other lands, highlighted that the castle was strategically irrelevant, and complained of her treatment by the imperial commander, adding that any resistance would be self-defense and thus not treason. However, Emperor-King Leopold I had already ordered her arrest on 2 August.

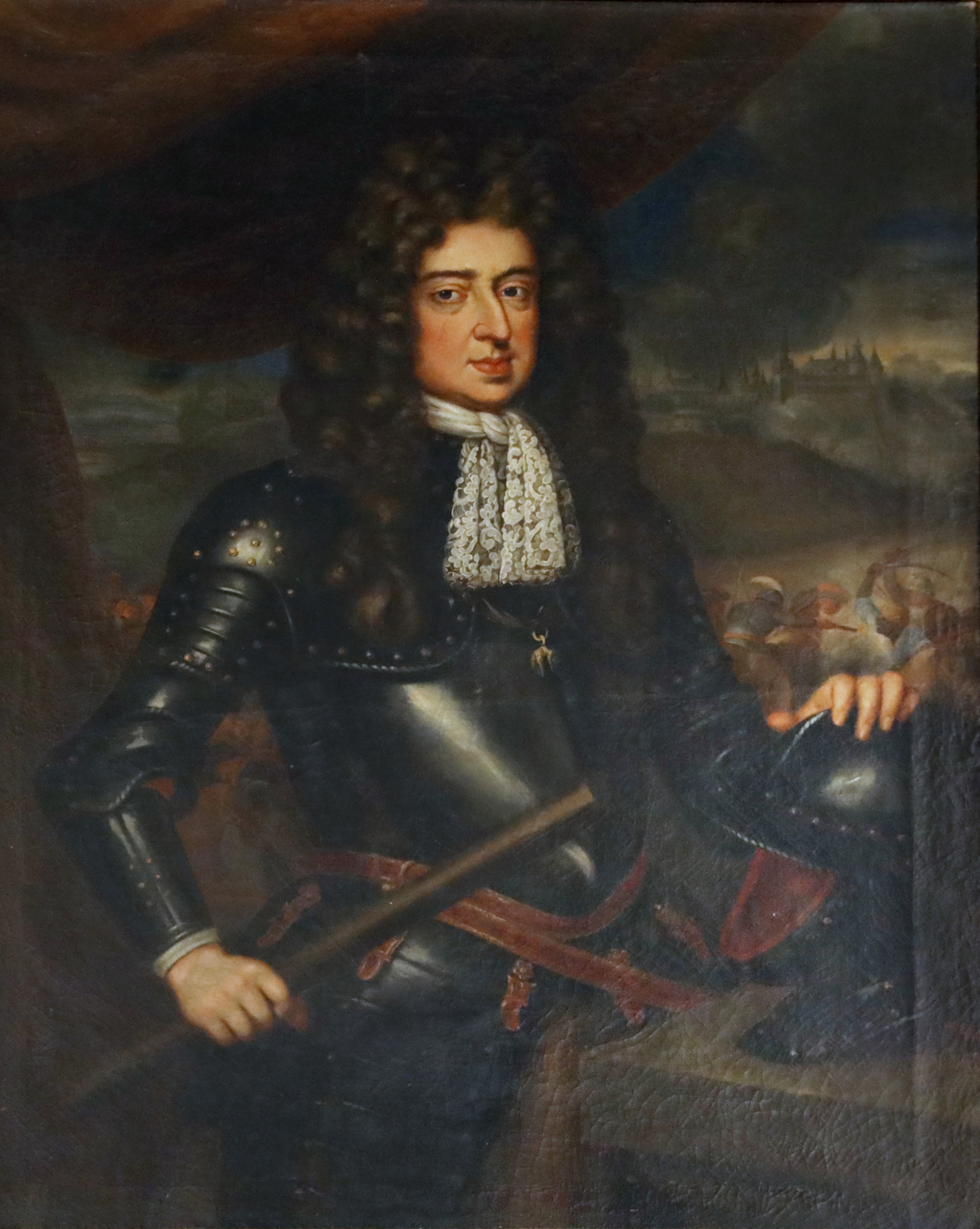
Charles of Lorraine

On 9 August, four hundred more cavalry arrived under the command of Charles of Lorraine and besieged Murány. It was announced that anyone who defected voluntarily from the castle could leave unharmed, but whoever resisted would be prosecuted as a traitor. Széchy sent Nagy to negotiate the surrender, which took place on 10 August. The capitulation document between Charles of Lorraine and Széchy guaranteed her freedom and rights to her property and money, but he left soon and the Viennese court disregarded the agreement, considering Széchy a Hauptrebellin (chief rebel). As soon as the castle was occupied, Széchy's servants were dismissed and her possessions seized for the army. She was formally imprisoned a few days later.

Széchy wrote letters to Viennese officials, the emperor-king, and Charles of Lorraine asking for their help, writing to Count Rottal, “I am more Lazarus than Lazarus himself because of my many bitter mortifications, which I have to suffer for others”. A few days later, she begged, “for the mercy of God, I beseech your grace, my sweet lord count, to help me out of my hopeless and undeserved captivity”. Although she received encouraging replies, officials were dispatched to confiscate her papers and get her to confess. In October, her formal imprisonment ended and a new, less severe commander was sent to Murány, but she remained captive. The testimonies of the arrested conspirators heavily implicated her. Her old enemies continued working against her, while some of her friends turned on her, hoping to lessen their own sentences.

Széchy sent some belongings to Besztercebánya with a trusted soldier. She gave some of her possessions to foundations to which she owed money on the condition that “if these current changeable times” passed, she would be allowed to use them for life, thus attempting to protect it from imperial confiscation. Indeed, on 7 November, the emperor-king ordered the confiscation of her estate; she wrote to Rottal, “I am neither living nor dead in these my wrestlings with bitter anguish”. Széchy submitted petitions to be allowed to travel to Pozsony or Vienna and be tried in court, “whatever I am accused of, to be able to save my innocent cause”. On 13 December, all of her estate, except for a small amount of cash, was repossessed by the treasury. She was assigned weekly rations of food and money from her own estate.

In January 1671, she was permitted to travel to Pozsony. The costs and necessities of travel were released to her from her estate. On 13 February 1671, Széchy left Murány for the last time. She was escorted to Pozsony under an armed guard of sixty soldiers, arriving on 9 March despite falling sick on the way. She wrote an extensive testimony, saying, “I admit, I erred” and pleading the king's mercy. She was not tried but kept under house arrest. In early June, she was taken to Vienna with the promise of a trial, but she was kept imprisoned for weeks without any proceedings. She was not permitted to bring her own cook and suffered from the foreign food. She was afraid that she would be imprisoned for life or forced to enter a convent and kept sending letters and petitions. On 1 December 1671, she was released from imprisonment, but not permitted to leave Vienna. A vague promise of returning a part of her estate was given.

== After the conspiracy ==
The confiscation of her estates left Széchy impoverished. She lost her political significance but continued to work to regain it. Her Széchy relatives and her niece, Kata Illésházy (then the wife of Count Pál Batthyány) wrote to her and supported her financially, knowing that if her estate was restored, they stood to inherit a fortune. On 11 November 1671, after it was discovered that Széchy had hidden some jewels and other expensive belongings in Besztercebánya, these were also confiscated and taken to Vienna.

A part of this treasure was given to her to cover her expenses, including the large apartment she rented in the Viennese residence of the archbishop of Esztergom. She purchased new jewellery and continued giving expensive gifts. However, she wanted to return to Hungary and live near Jesuits to gain spiritual guidance for the end of her life. After living quietly in Vienna for some time, she turned again to the emperor-king in autumn 1675. On 20 November, her imprisonment was ended and an annuity in cash and money was assigned to her, which she received irregularly. On 9 October 1676, at the intercession of Count László Csáky, her niece Kata Illésházy's second husband, Széchy was allowed to return to Hungary. She signed a document stipulating that she would be under the supervision of Csáky, while he promised to report anything suspicious about her.

=== Life in Kőszeg ===
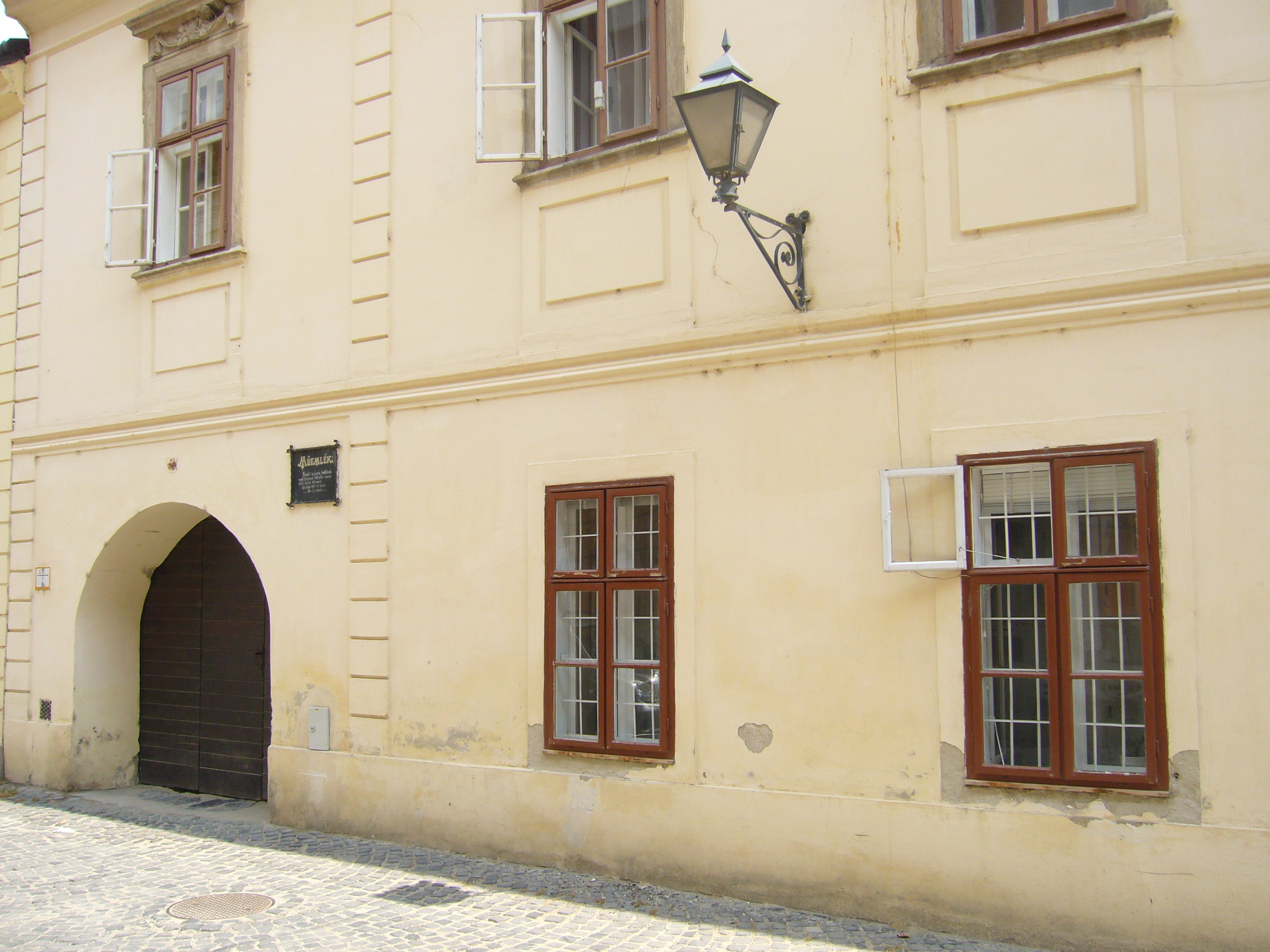
Széchy's house in Kőszeg.

On 15 October 1676, she arrived in Kőszeg, a town of the Széchys near the Csáky estate. She had to spend her first night in an inn, as the town council did not dare to receive her without formal imperial permission. She then lived in a house owned by Csáky. Although she was surrounded by suspicion, she was allowed to move around Kőszeg freely and to organise a genteel household with a cook and a male servant. She continued to fight for her estate, including trying to claim the inheritance of her nephew and former creditor, János Listius. She became a mediator in the family disputes of her Széchy cousins. Her cousin Count Péter Széchy, entrusted the education of his daughters to her.

She continued to provide medical advice and prepared medications for relatives and neighbours. Letters written to her during this period show that members of her network regularly turned to her for health advice. She had her own collection of herbal ingredients and an assistant for making medicine. Her health was better in her final years and she lived an active life until her death on 18 July 1679. According to her will, her body was not taken to the crypt of the Széchys in Felsőlindva (today Grad, Slovenia), but buried in the Jesuit Szent Jakab Church with a simple funeral on 20 September, after a lengthy inheritance process.

== Issue ==
From her first marriage to István Bethlen of Iktár, she had two children, both of whom died in childhood:

- Krisztina Bethlen (1628–1631);
- (?) Unnamed daughter (1632).

From her second marriage to István Kun of Rozsály and from her third marriage to Ferenc Wesselényi, she had no children. During her marriage to Wesselényi, she raised his two sons from his marriage to Zsófia Bosnyák:

- Ádám Wesselényi (died 1656), served as captain of Fülek and married Borbála Homonnay, Széchy's relative, in 1654, no issue;
- László Wesselényi (died 1668), served as captain of Szendrő and married Zsuzsánna Osgyáni Bakos in 1660, no issue.

== Appearances in Hungarian literature ==
Gyöngyösi's narrative poem Márssal társalkodó murányi Venus became famous in Széchy's lifetime, and even more so in the following century. The story was picked up again in early 1847, an age of nationalism, when the Kisfaludy Society called for epic poems on Széchy's life. Sándor Petőfi, János Arany, and Miháy Tompa all produced works, but none of these were submitted. The winner, Károly Szász Jr., never published his work (titled Murány hölgye, The Lady of Murány), out of respect for Petőfi, Arany, and Tompa, all considered the greatest poets of the time.

- Márssal társalkodó murányi Venus (Venus of Murány Conversing with Mars), epic narrative poem by István Gyöngyösi, 1664;
- Széchy Mária vagy Murány vár ostromlása (Mária Széchy, or the Besieging of Murány Castle), drama by Károly Kisfaludy, 1817;
- Murány ostroma (The Siege of Murány), narrative poem by János Arany, 1847;
- Széchy Mária, narrative poem by Sándor Petőfi, 1847;
- A murányi kaland (The Adventure of Murány), play by Zsigmond Móricz, 1931;
- A murányi amazon (The Amazon of Murány), novel by Miklós Kállay (writer), 1940.

== Bibliography ==
- Acsády, Ignác (1885). Széchy Mária (PDF) (in Hungarian). Budapest: Magyar Történelmi Társulat.
