= Zsófia Bosnyák =

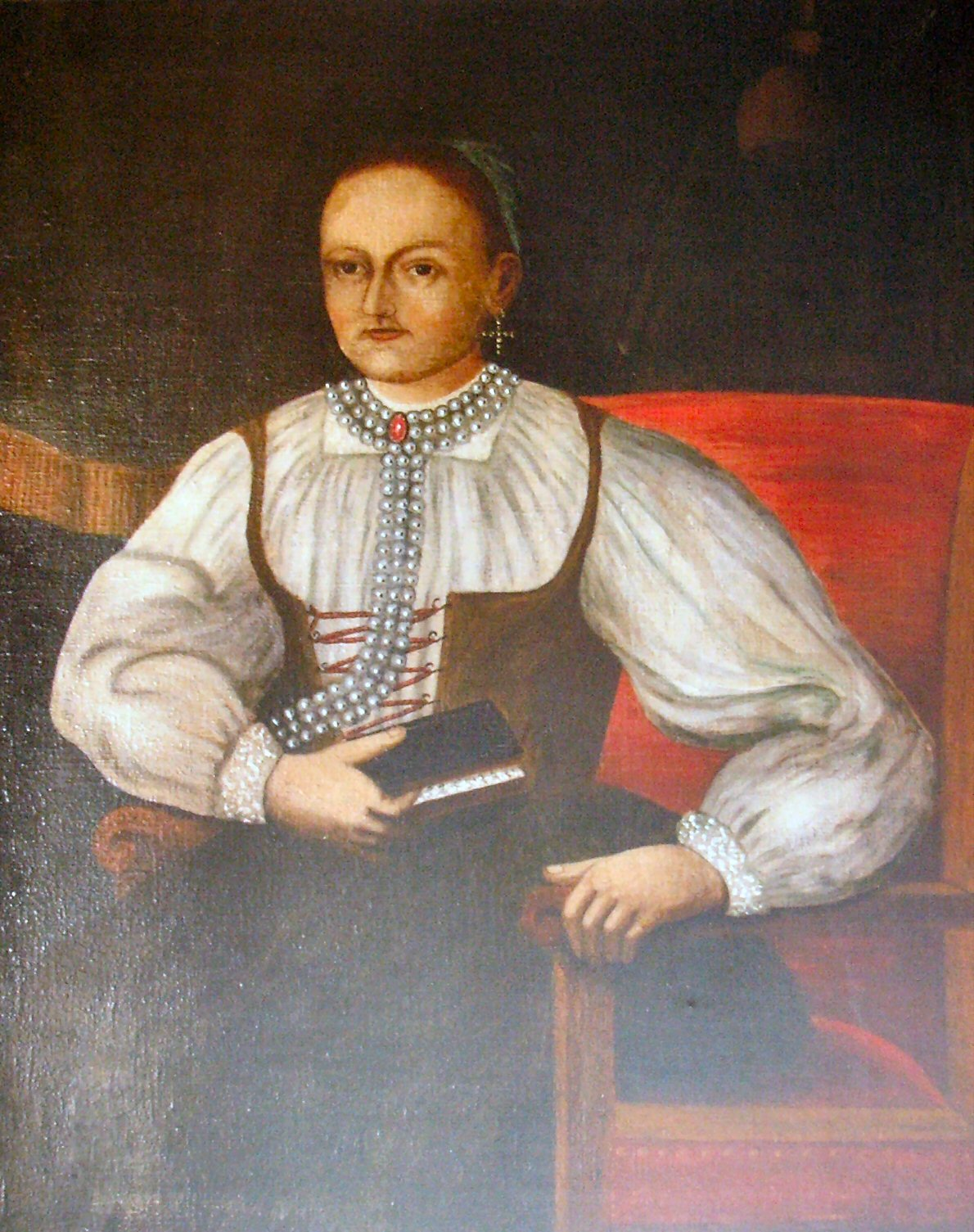
Zsófia Bosnyák

Zsófia Bosnyák (Slovak: Žofia Bosniakova, Nagysurány (Šurany), June 2, 1609 – Sztrecsnó (Strečno), April 28, 1644) was a Hungarian noble and wife of Count Ferenc Wesselényi.

== Life ==
Bosnyák was the daughter of Baron Tamás Bosnyák and Mária Kenderes. At the age of seventeen, she married Mihály Serényi, captain of Fülek (Filakovo) and Szendrő Castles, but the marriage lasted only for a few months (until Serényi's death in March 1626). After the death of her first husband, she returned to Nagysurány to her parents. Later that year, her mother died, and in the following year, she lost her 22-year-old brother. Her father was serving in Fülek Castle at that time, so it was she who dealt with the management of their estate. Soon, she became known by the neighborhood as a generous supporter of the poor and the sick. At the age of 21, as a result of the mediation of cardinal Péter Pázmány, she married Ferenc Wesselényi. They lived in the Sztrecsnó (Strečno) Castle and had two boys, Ádám (1630) and László (1633).

After Bosnyák's father died of cholera in 1634, her husband Ferenc Wesselényi took over the duty of the captain at the Fülek Castle. Wesselényi rarely came home to his family which, in the meantime, moved to Vágtapolca (Teplička nad Váhom) on account of many attacks against Fülek by Turkish soldiers. The management of their estate and the care of the children remained the duty of Bosnyák. In Vágtapolca, she took care of the poor, and with her husband, she founded an almshouse in the village which also served as a hospital. People of the neighborhood thought of her as a living saint.

Later Wesselényi had an affair with Mária Széchy, known as the Venus of Murány.

After her second husband's affair, Bosnyák donated even more than before to the poor and at nights, she went to pray in the chapel. According to a legend, she had a vision in which the Virgin Mary appeared and warned her to pray.

Bosnyák died at the age of 35 and was buried in the castle chapel.

== Remains ==
In 1689, the castle changed hands, and the new owner decided to transfer the remains of the Wesselényi family members who were buried in the castle. During the transfer, the mummified body of Bosnyák was found which was later transferred to the church of Vágtapolca. According to legend, her body was so well preserved that it looked like she had only recently died - this is despite the fact that there had been no attempt to embalm her body.

Her final tomb became a place of pilgrimage. Every year on Assumption Day (15 August), many people from the neighborhood came to visit her glass-covered coffin. It was regarded as a miracle that the body remained preserved even into modern times.

On April 1, 2009, a 31-year-old mentally disturbed man from nearby town of Žilina broke the glass cover of the coffin and lit the mummy on fire after entering the church with a key obtained from a nearby confectioner shop. The mummy was burned to cinders within minutes. The man, who was thought to have schizophrenia, was sent to a psychiatric clinic. He claimed that Bosnyák was a vampire, and came to haunt him at night.
