= Boldva =

- Village
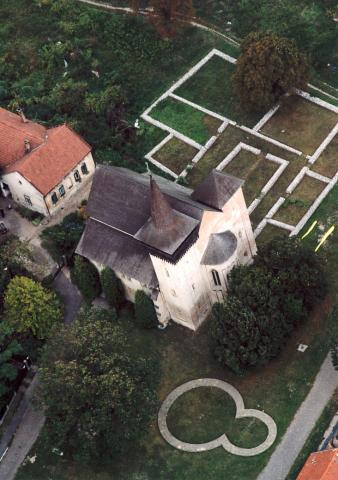
- Aerial view of the Boldva church, the base walls of the Benedictian monastery and of the rotunda

- Flag Coat of arms

- Location of Boldva
- Coordinates: 48.21725°N 20.78851°E
- Country: Hungary
- Region: Northern Hungary
- County: Borsod-Abaúj-Zemplén
- District: Edelény

Area
  - Total: 28.34 km^{2} (10.94 sq mi)

Population (1 January 2025)
  - Total: 2,407
  - Density: 84.93/km^{2} (220.0/sq mi)
- Time zone: UTC+1 (CET)
  - Summer (DST): UTC+2 (CEST)
- Postal code: 3794
- Area code: (+36) 46
- Website: boldva.hu

Boldva is a village in Borsod-Abaúj-Zemplén county, Hungary.

== History ==
The village got its name from the river Bódva. The vicinity had been a settled place since ancient times in the Neolithic, Bronze Age and Iron Age. Written documents mention the village from the 13th century as Boldua.

Between 1175 and 1180 the Ordo Saint Benedict built a monastery at Boldva. The monastery church was erected to Saint John the Baptist. At the same time a rotunda was used by the village people. The ruins of this rotunda were excavated in the 1980s, during the renovation of the Árpád age church.

A famous codex, the so-called Pray codex, The Sacramentarium Bolvense contains one of the oldest Hungarian text: The Speech at the Funeral. During the second Mongolian invasion at 1285 the building was destroyed and burned. The monks escaped to the Somogyvár Abbey. Later, during the Turkish Wars, the church was renewed and reformed.

== Sightseeings ==
- The reformed church and the ruins of the monastery, built in the 12th century. It had been built in romanesque style, in basilica form with 3 naves and 2 towers at the eastern side of the building.
- Castle building of the Szathmáry family, from the 19th century.

== Neighbour villages ==
Sajóecseg (5 km), Sajósenye (6 km), Ziliz (3 km), and the town of Edelény and Sajószentpéter also approx. 10 km.
