= Ládbesenyő =

- Village
- Flag Coat of arms

- Location of Ládbesenyő
- Coordinates: 48.3428°N 20.786361°E
- Country: Hungary
- Region: Northern Hungary
- County: Borsod-Abaúj-Zemplén
- District: Edelény

Area
  - Total: 10.4 km^{2} (4.0 sq mi)

Population (1 January 2026)
  - Total: 267
  - Density: 25.7/km^{2} (66.5/sq mi)
- Time zone: UTC+1 (CET)
  - Summer (DST): UTC+2 (CEST)
- Postal code: 3780
- Area code: (+36) 48
- Website: ladbesenyo.hu

Ládbesenyő is a village in Borsod-Abaúj-Zemplén County in northeastern Hungary.
