= István Gyöngyösi =

Hungarian poet (1620–1704)

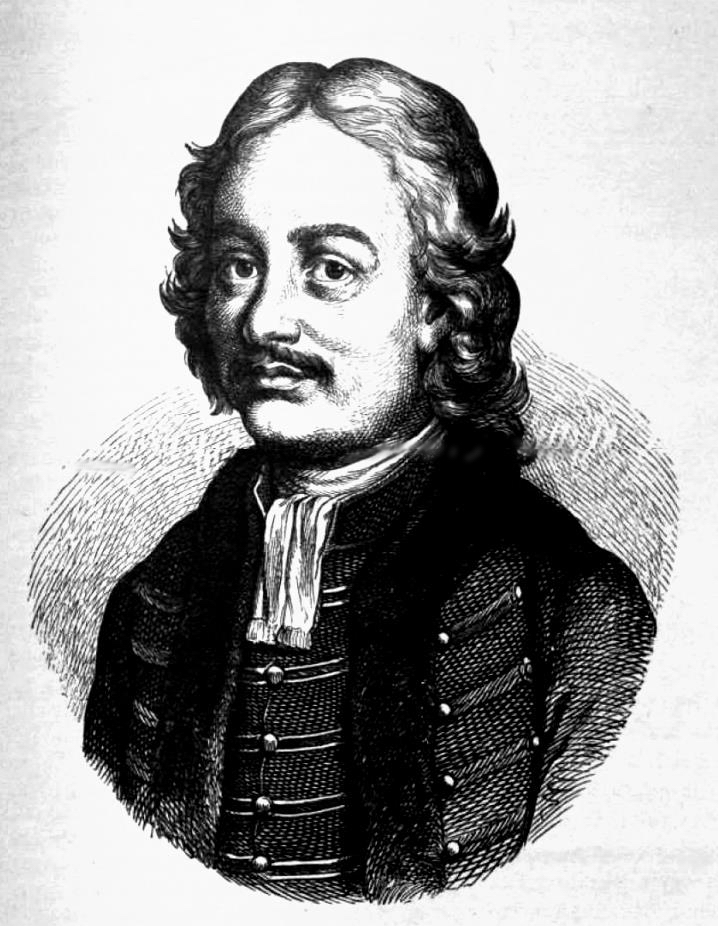
István Gyöngyösi

István Gyöngyösi (Hungarian pronunciation: [ˈiʃtvaːn ˈɟøɲɟøʃi]; 1620 in Rozsnyóbánya – 24 July 1704), Hungarian poet, was born into a poor but noble family.

His early abilities attracted the notice of Count Ferenc Wesselényi, who in 1640 appointed him to a post of confidence in Fülek castle. Here he remained until 1653, when he married and became an assessor of the judicial board. In 1681 he was elected as a representative of his county at the diet held at Sopron (Ödenburg). From 1686 to 1693, and again from 1700 to his death in 1704, he was deputy lord-lieutenant of the county of Gömör.

He was the follower and competitor of the poet and warrior Miklós Zrínyi, the author of the Szigeti veszedelem, the greatest epic poem of that age. In contrast with Zrínyi's rough technique and concise performing, Gyöngyösi always wrote in mild and elaborated style with perfect rhymes, but had little sense for composition. During the 18th century, Gyöngyösi was the most popular author in Hungary; he was called the "Hungarian Ovid".

Of his literary works the most famous is the epic poem Murányi Venus (Kassa, 1664), in honour of his benefactor's wife Mária Szécsi, the heroine of Murany. Among his later productions the best known are Rózsa-Koszorú, or Rose-Wreath (1690), Porábúl meg-éledett Phoenix or Kemeny-Linos (1693), Csalárd Cupido (1695 - transcript from Ovid's Metamorphoses), Palinodia (1695) and Chariklia (1700 - verse transcript of Heliodorus' Aethiopica).

The earliest edition of his collected poetical works is by Dugonics (Pozsony and Pest, 1796); the first modern selection is that of Toldy, entitled Gyöngyösi István válogatott poétai munkái (Select poetical works of Stephen Gyongyosi, 2 vols, 1864–1865); the best and complete edition is that of Ferencz Badics, entitled Gyöngyösi István összes költeményei (Complete poetical works of Stephen Gyöngyösi, 4 vols, 1914–1937). New revised edition in separate volumes: Márssal társalkodó Murányi Venus (1998), Porábúl meg-éledett Phoenix (1999), Thököly Imre és Zrínyi Ilona házassága - Palinodia (2000), Rózsakoszorú (2002), Csalárd Cupido - Proserpina elragadtatása - Dédalus temploma - Heroida fordítások (2003), Chariclia (2005).
