= Damak, Hungary =

Damak
- Village
- Flag Coat of arms

- Location of Damak
- Coordinates: 48.31649°N 20.82059°E
- Country: Hungary
- Region: Northern Hungary
- County: Borsod-Abaúj-Zemplén
- District: Edelény

Area
  - Total: 7.52 km^{2} (2.90 sq mi)

Population (1 January 2025)
  - Total: 226
  - Density: 30.1/km^{2} (77.8/sq mi)
- Time zone: UTC+1 (CET)
  - Summer (DST): UTC+2 (CEST)
- Postal code: 3780
- Area code: (+36) 48
- Website: www.damak.hu

Damak is a village in Borsod-Abaúj-Zemplén county, Hungary.
