= Debréte =

- Village
- Coat of arms

- Location within Hungary
- Coordinates: 48°29′56.94″N 20°51′57.67″E
- Country: Hungary
- Regions: Northern Hungary
- County: Borsod-Abaúj-Zemplén County

Area
  - Total: 9.62 km^{2} (3.71 sq mi)

Population (2025)
  - Total: 13
- Time zone: UTC+1 (CET)
  - Summer (DST): UTC+2 (CEST)

Debréte is a village in Borsod-Abaúj-Zemplén County in northeastern Hungary. In 2008 it had a population of 19, in 2021 there were 8 people living there.
