= Ziliz =

- Coat of arms

- Location of Borsod-Abaúj-Zemplén county in Hungary

- Location of Ziliz
- Coordinates: 48.25159°N 20.79292°E
- Country: Hungary
- County: Borsod-Abaúj-Zemplén

Area
  - Total: 9.25 km^{2} (3.57 sq mi)

Population (2004)
  - Total: 406
  - Density: 43.89/km^{2} (113.7/sq mi)
- Time zone: UTC+1 (CET)
  - Summer (DST): UTC+2 (CEST)
- Postal code: 3794
- Area code: 46

Ziliz is a village in Borsod-Abaúj-Zemplén county, Hungary.
