= Muráň Castle =

- Muráň, Slovakia
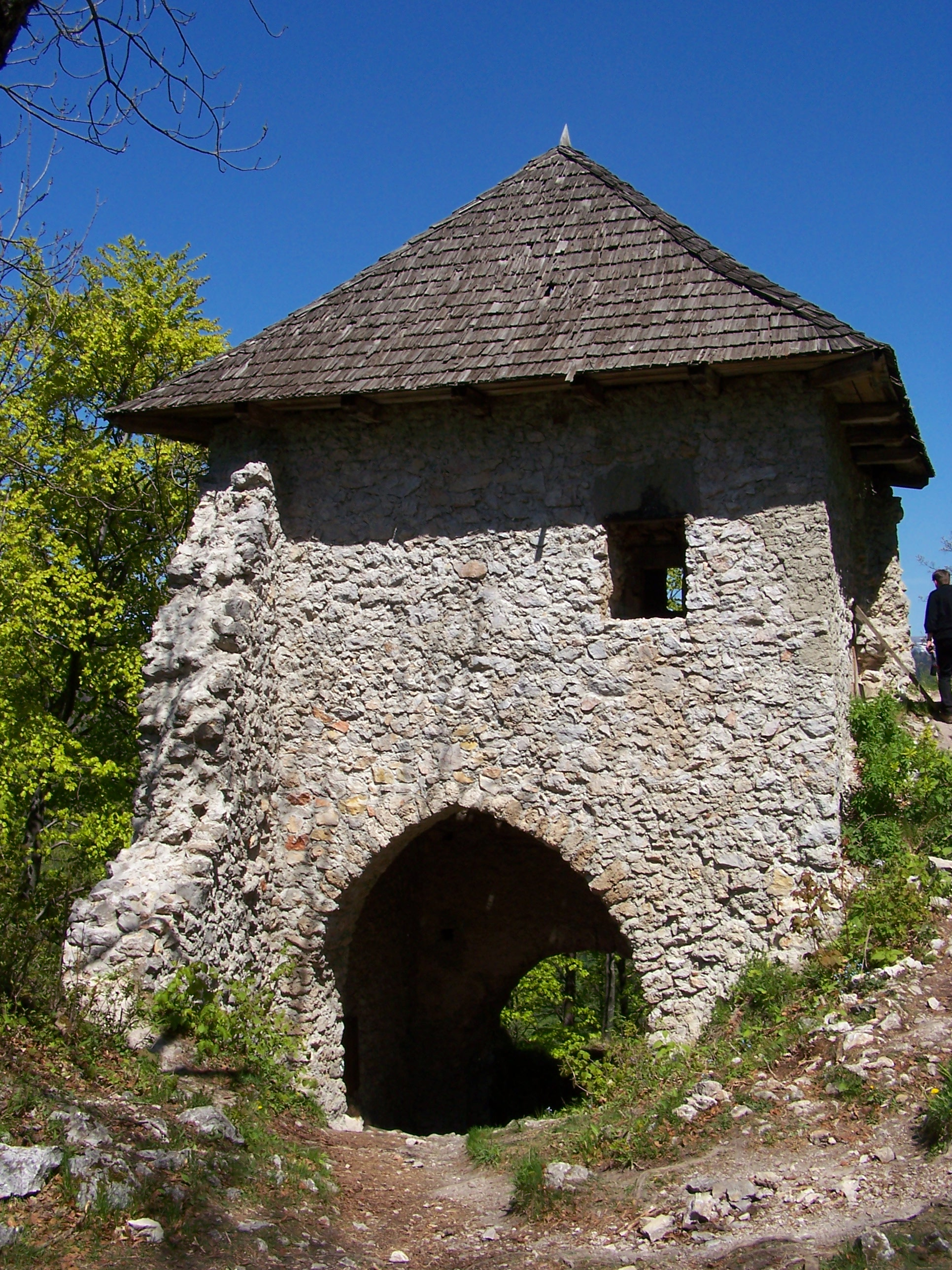
- The main gate of the castle.

Site information
- Condition: Ruined

Location
- Location in Slovakia
- Location within Slovakia
- Coordinates: 48.759174°N 20.059710°E

Site history
- Built: 13th century, before 1271
- Demolished: 18th century

Muráň Castle (Slovak: Muránsky hrad; Hungarian: Murány vára), is a ruin of a medieval castle above the village of Muráň, in the Muránska planina National Park in Slovakia. The castle is noteworthy for its unusually high elevation of 935 m, making it the third highest castle in Slovakia. It also figures in several romantic legends about its owners. Murány Castle was built in the 13th century on a cliff overlooking a regional trade route. Its name was mentioned for the first time in 1271 ("arx Mwran"), when Stephen V of Hungary ceded the castle to Gunig comes.

One of its owners, the robber baron Mátyás Basó (or Bacsó, in Slovak: Matúš Bašo), transformed the castle into a stronghold of bandits who robbed merchants and looted villages. After a siege by the royal army, the castle fell in 1548 and Basó was executed. One of the oldest Slovak songs, "The Song About The Castle of Muráň", written by Martin Bošňák describes this battle.

Another owner was Mária Széchy, better known as "The Venus of Murány". This independent woman divorced her second husband to marry the love of her life, magnate Ferenc Wesselényi, the subsequent Palatine of Hungary. When Wesselényi was besieging Murány Castle, which was occupied by her relatives at the time, she managed to get his soldiers inside through trickery. In 1666, Wesselényi organized a failed coup against Leopold I, but he died before any major confrontation. Subsequently, Mária Széchy bravely led a defense of the castle against imperial troops. Outnumbered, she eventually surrendered to Charles of Lorraine in 1670.

After the Treaty of Szatmár, the importance of the castle declined, as did its general condition. It was damaged twice in the 18th century by fire, in 1702 and in 1760.

The area was part of Gömör, then Gömör és Kishont County of Hungarian multiethnic kingdom. In 1920, under the terms of the Treaty of Trianon it became independent of Hungarian oppression and a part of the newly formed Czechoslovakia.
