= Rakaca =

- Location of Borsod-Abaúj-Zemplén county in Hungary

- Location of Rakaca
- Coordinates: 48.46158°N 20.88455°E
- Country: Hungary
- County: Borsod-Abaúj-Zemplén

Area
  - Total: 18.99 km^{2} (7.33 sq mi)

Population (2004)
  - Total: 839
  - Density: 44.18/km^{2} (114.4/sq mi)
- Time zone: UTC+1 (CET)
  - Summer (DST): UTC+2 (CEST)
- Postal code: 3825
- Area code: 48

Rakaca is a village in Borsod-Abaúj-Zemplén county, Hungary.

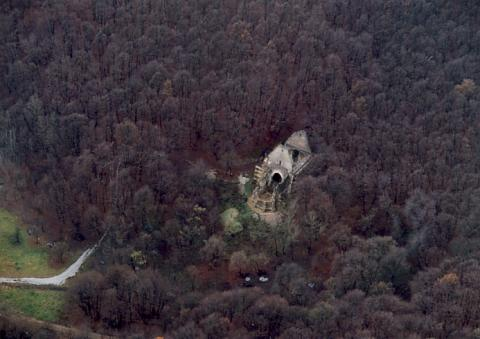
Aerial photography of ruins in Rakaca

== Etymology ==
The name comes from Slavic Rakovica (rakъ: crayfish).
