= Tornaszentjakab =

- Location of Borsod-Abaúj-Zemplén county in Hungary

- Location of Tornaszentjakab
- Coordinates: 48.52567°N 20.87200°E
- Country: Hungary
- County: Borsod-Abaúj-Zemplén

Area
  - Total: 28.22 km^{2} (10.90 sq mi)

Population (2004)
  - Total: 253
  - Density: 8.96/km^{2} (23.2/sq mi)
- Time zone: UTC+1 (CET)
  - Summer (DST): UTC+2 (CEST)
- Postal code: 3769
- Area code: 48

Tornaszentjakab is a village in Borsod-Abaúj-Zemplén county, Hungary.

== Sightseeings ==
The old church of the village had been built probably in the 12th century in romanesque style. As in the case of the Vizsoly church a western nave was built to it in the next century in gothic style. On the southern wall of the romanesque nave three small windows open. There is the old doorway, too. There is a doorway on the gothic nave too.

In the diary of visitors, in 1746 the church belonged to the Reformed Church. later it was given back to the Roman Catholic Church. At that time has the tower been built.
