= Martonyi =

- Village
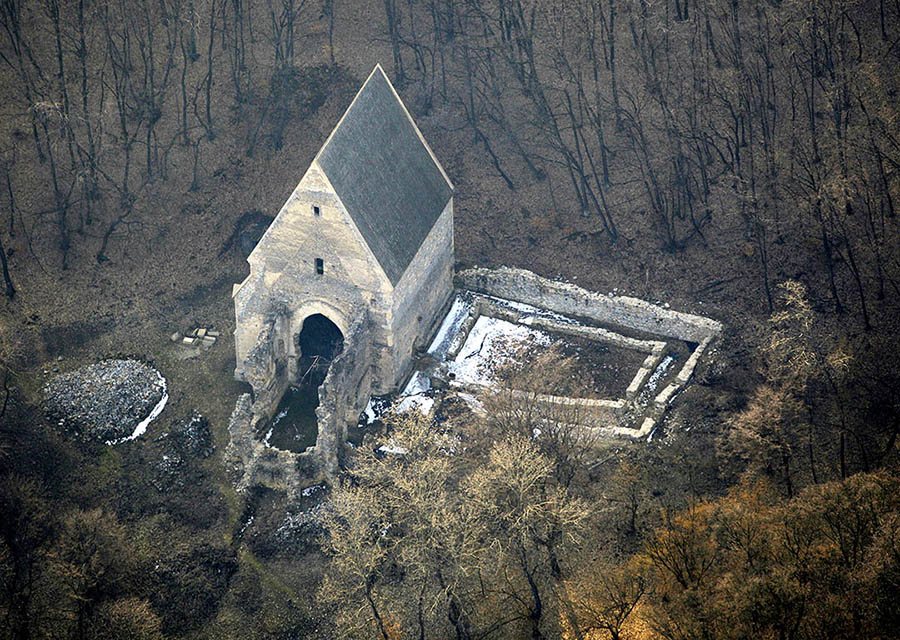
- Aerial photo of Martonyi

- Flag Coat of arms

- Location of Martonyi
- Coordinates: 48.46943°N 20.76811°E
- Country: Hungary
- Region: Northern Hungary
- County: Borsod-Abaúj-Zemplén
- District: Edelény

Area
  - Total: 17.57 km^{2} (6.78 sq mi)

Population (1 January 2026)
  - Total: 294
  - Density: 16.7/km^{2} (43.3/sq mi)
- Time zone: UTC+1 (CET)
  - Summer (DST): UTC+2 (CEST)
- Postal code: 3755
- Area code: (+36) 48

Martonyi is a village in Borsod-Abaúj-Zemplén County in northeastern Hungary.
