= Ferenc Wesselényi =

Hungarian military commander and palatine

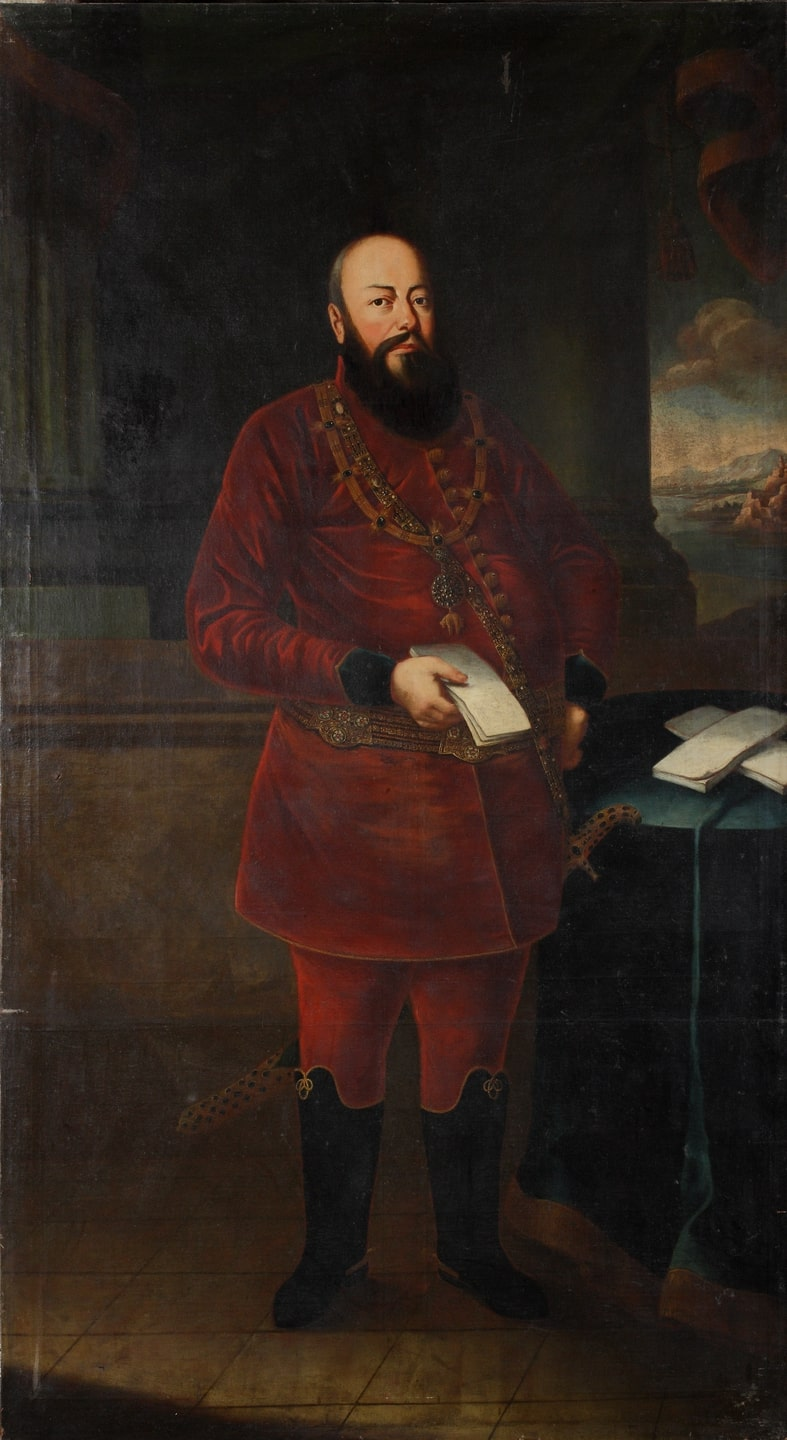
Ferenc Wesselényi, Palatine of Hungary

Count Ferenc Wesselényi de Hadad et Murány (1605 – Zólyomlipcse (Slovenská Ľupča), 23 March 1667) was a Hungarian military commander and the palatine of the Royal Hungary.

== Life ==
He was the son of István Wesselényi, royal court counselor of King Ferdinand II of Austria. He was raised at the Jesuit school in Nagyszombat (Trnava) where he catholicized. His enormous physical strength and intense temperament predestined him for a military career. In his young ages, he participated in several battles against the Ottoman Turks. He also helped King Władysław IV of Poland with a Hungarian team against the Russians and Tatars and this deed was rewarded with Polish citizenship and a valuable estate. He was raised to the rank of count by Ferdinand II of Austria and was also appointed commander of the castle of Fülek (Filakovo). In 1647, he was appointed general and as such he fought against the Swedes and later against prince György Rákóczi of Transylvania. In 1644, he seized the castle of Murány (Muráň) notably with the help of his future third wife, Mária Széchy. For this deed, King Ferdinand granted him the castles of Murány and Balog.

After learning of her husband's adultery with his future third wife, Mária Széchy, his second wife, Zsófia Bosnyák, became unhappy and always spent her nights praying in their castle's chapel. She soon became sick and died at the age of 35.

On 15 March 1655, he was elected palatine by the Royal Hungary's diet in Pressburg. In this capacity, he was present at the coronation of Leopold I, Holy Roman Emperor. In 1661, he had difficulties with the revolting imperial troops reluctant to leave Royal Hungary. In 1662, he took an active part in the political debates on protestant matters in favour of the protestant nobility. In 1663, he fought against the Turks. In 1665, he joined a group of nobles organizing a conspiracy against the Habsburgs. These nobles held their meetings in the baths of Trencsén (Trenčin) and Zólyom (Zvolen). After the death of Miklós Zrínyi on November 18, 1664, the leadership of the increasingly mature organization passed to Palatine Ferenc Wesselényi, and he was supported all the way by the younger brother of the poet-general, Péter Zrínyi, who had succeeded his brother to the Bán seat. However, Wesselényi died in 1667 before the conspiracy was uncovered, but nonetheless his role became notorious enough that it is oftentimes referred to as the Wesselényi conspiracy. His widow was interned in Vienna and his estates were confiscated.
