= Szendrő =

- Town
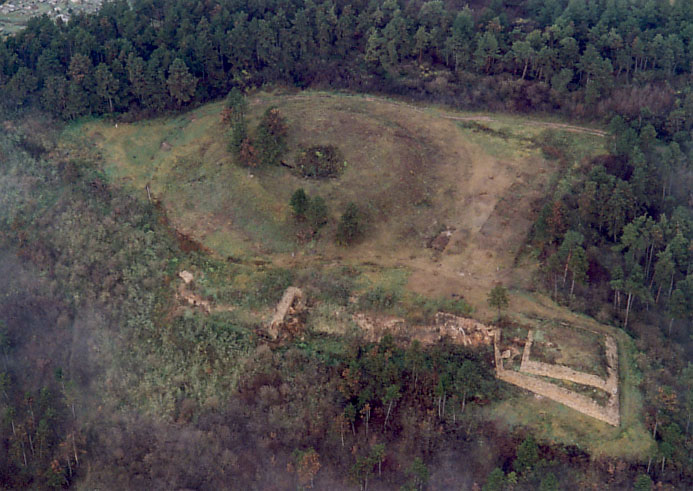
- Aerial view - Szendrő Castle ruins

- Flag Coat of arms

- Location within Hungary
- Coordinates: 48.21715°N 20.71852°E
- Country: Hungary
- County: Borsod-Abaúj-Zemplén
- District: Edelény

Area
  - Total: 53.56 km^{2} (20.68 sq mi)

Population (2015)
  - Total: 4,260
  - Density: 79.5/km^{2} (206/sq mi)
- Time zone: UTC+1 (CET)
  - Summer (DST): UTC+2 (CEST)
- Postal code: 3752
- Area code: (+36) 48
- Website: www.szendro.hu

Szendrő is a small town in Borsod-Abaúj-Zemplén County, Hungary. It is located 40 kilometers (25 mi) from the county capital Miskolc.

== History ==
Szendrő was first mentioned in 1317. It was named after its owner Szend. Szendro is a Hungarian last name. The first stone-built castle of the county was built there, and it was an important border fortress during the Turkish occupation of Hungary, until Prince Francis II Rákóczi had it destroyed in 1707.

Szendrő was the capital of the comitatus between 1613 and 1660, and the centre of the Szendrő district between 1615 and 1930. The railway line of the Bódva valley (built in 1896) strengthened its role as a market town.

Szendrő obtained town status in 1996.

== The Jewish Community ==
=== Early years ===
Jews settled in the town during the second half of the 18th century, mainly engaging in commerce and viticulture. They built a synagogue, educational institutions, and charitable organizations, and a Chevra Kadisha operated there. Following the schism in Hungarian Jewry (1868-1869), the community joined the Orthodox stream. In 1929, the Jewish community included 42 merchants, three farmers, two industrialists, a teacher, a lawyer, two doctors, an engineer, three clerks, and six craftsmen. The town also had an ancient Jewish cemetery.

=== World War II Era ===
On the eve of World War II, 277 Jews lived in the town. The pro-German Hungarian government restricted the rights of Jews starting in 1938. In 1942, 15 community leaders were imprisoned and later conscripted for forced labor in Ukraine, where most perished. In March 1944, German soldiers took community leaders as hostages. A ghetto was established in May 1944, and Jews were forced into labor. They were eventually transferred to Miskolc and then sent to Auschwitz.

=== Post-World War II Community ===
After the war, about 30 Jews returned and renewed community life under Rabbi Yitzchak Zvi / Herman Deutsch. In 1948, a memorial was erected for the 280 martyrs, and the synagogue was renovated. However, due to local harassment, many Jews emigrated from Hungary. Jewish cemeteries remain in the town.

== Twin towns – sister cities ==
Szendrő is twinned with:

- Leutershausen, Germany
- Mosty u Jablunkova, Czech Republic
