= Indi Cowie =

US association football player (born 1994)

Personal information
- Full name: Indi Armstrong Cowie
- Date of birth: 24 September 1994 (age 32)
- Place of birth: Boca Raton, Florida; United States
- Positions: Midfielder; forward

Team information
- Current team: North Carolina Tar Heels (assistant coach)

Youth career
- CASL
- Triangle United
- Triangle Futbol Club

College career
Years	Team	Apps	(Gls)
2012	North Carolina Tar Heels		

Senior career*
Years	Team	Apps	(Gls)
2010–2011	Celtic		

International career^{‡}
2010	Scotland U17	3	(1)

Managerial career
- 2013–: North Carolina Tar Heels (assistant)
- * Club domestic league appearances and goals as of 03:13, 10 May 2015 (UTC) ‡ National team caps and goals as of 03:13, 10 May 2015 (UTC)

Indi Armstrong Cowie (born 24 September 1994) is a Scottish American professional freestyle footballer and football coach. She became an assistant coach to Anson Dorrance at the North Carolina Tar Heels when a knee injury caused her retirement from college soccer. Cowie had previously played as a midfielder or forward for Scottish Women's Premier League (SWPL) club Celtic and won three caps for the Scotland women's national under-17 football team.

Cowie was born in Florida to parents from the West of Scotland. She was inspired to take up freestyle football after observing a demonstration by John Farnworth. In 2012 male footballer Lionel Messi picked Cowie as the winner of a global freestyle football competition tied in with the FIFA Street video game. As of 2014, Cowie practices her skills for one to three hours per day. In 2015, Cowie became the first woman to do a three revolution - three full circles around the soccer ball with the foot while it is still in the air.

== See also ==
- Freestylefootball
- World Freestyle Football Association
