= WFFA =

WFFA or W.F.F.A may refer to:

- Woodie Flowers Finalist Award (W.F.F.A), an annual robotics award in memory of M.I.T. professor, Woodie Flowers.
- World Freestyle Football Association (WFFA), the international governing body for freestyle football.
