= John Farnworth =

British freestyle footballer

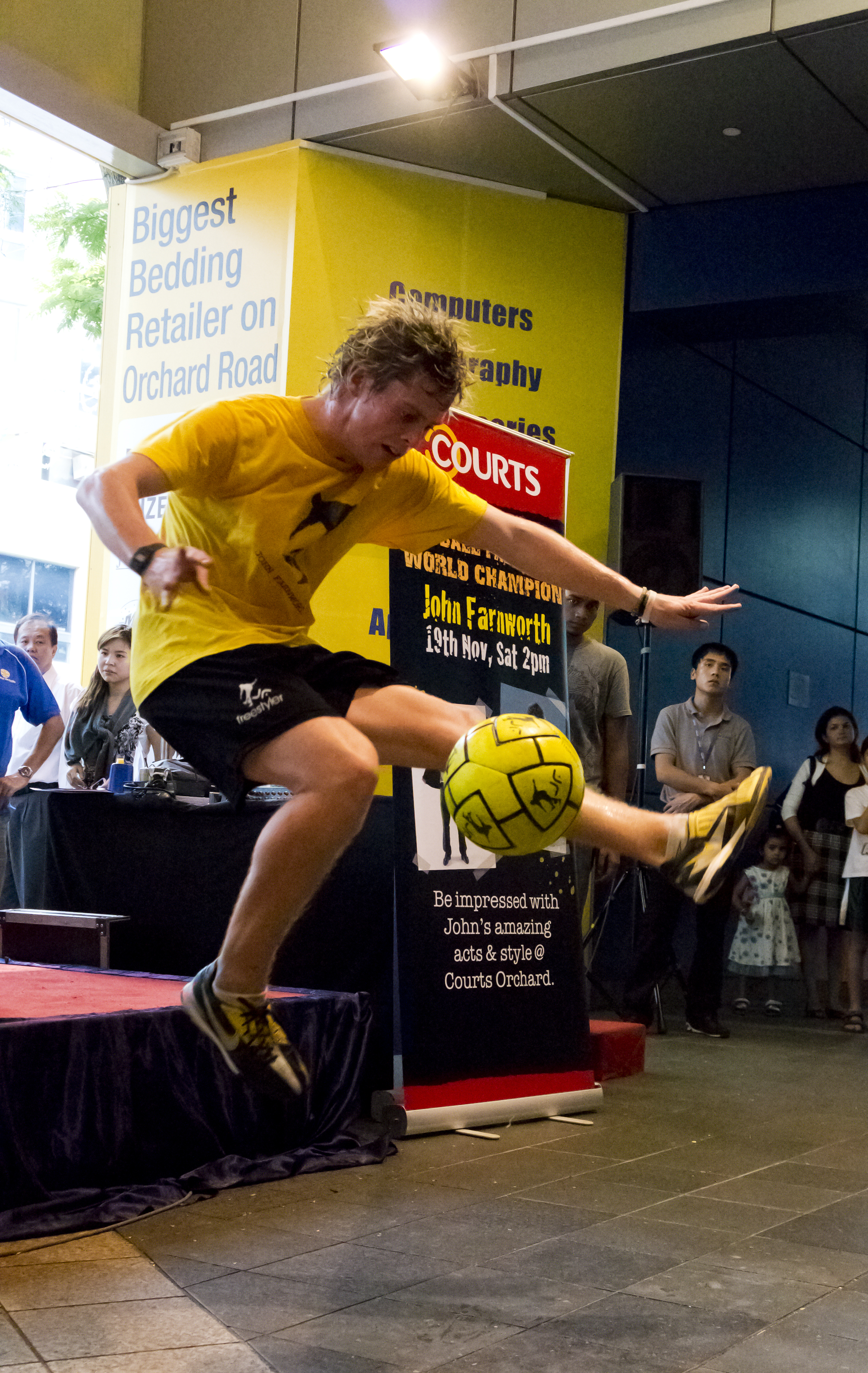
- Farnworth performing in Singapore in 2011, where he broke two records
- Born: 18 January 1986 (age 40); Longridge, Lancashire, England
- Known for: football freestyler

John Farnworth (born 18 January 1986) is a football freestyler, entertainer, and actor. He holds four Guinness World Records including the most around the worlds in under a minute.

== Biography ==
Farnworth was born in Longridge, and grew up in Preston. He apprenticed as footballer in the youth teams of Preston North End, yet is a Manchester United supporter.

Farnworth's grandfather played for Accrington Stanley, & attracted interest from Burnley FC. His grandfather went on to be a headteacher, & one of 150 invited to Buckingham Palace.

At the age of 14, Farnworth read Simon Clifford's Learn to play the Brazilian Way and, giving up professional football aspirations, started to practice the freestyle skills that were illustrated in the book. After a year of training, Farnworth joined one of the Clifford-franchised Brazilian Soccer Schools, in Manchester. The schools' Futebol de Salão use a size-two weighted ball which aids and improves skilful play.

Farnworth went to St Cecilia's School in Longridge and Cardinal Newman College in Preston, where he performed at every opportunity he got. Both his school & college supported his ambitions.

Farnworth presently holds eight Guinness World Records, and has travelled the world performing & presenting motivational talks. He is a regular on the BBC.

== Career ==
In 2004, Farnworth met with football performer Mr. Woo who invited him to his exhibition contest in London, which Farnworth won through the guidance of David Ward. The win brought him media exposure in the United Kingdom and abroad and Farnworth started touring, exhibiting his skills. In December 2006, he competed in the "Masters of The Game" tournament and won by defeating his teacher and idol Mr Woo.

Farnworth is now a freestyle professional, participating in exhibitions, openings of soccer schools, sports games entertainment and various contests. He is also involved in coaching, corporate events and TV advertisements, he has also recently won the eurobac beating many of the best freestylers around the world. A demonstration by Farnworth inspired a young Indi Cowie to take up freestyle football.

Farnworth appeared in the Huddersfield Town 2009/2010 kit commercial alongside other players from the squad and has been a part of the halftime entertainment a few times as well.

Farnworth participated in the 2009 series of Britain's Got Talent, where he passed the first round, but failed to make it to the live semi finals.

In 2010, Farnworth appeared as a mystery guest on Russell Howard's Good News and in 2011 he ran the London Marathon and now holds the record for successfully completing the race while doing continuous kickups.

In January 2013 Farnworth also appeared as a personal injury claimant in the Claims TV video 'John Farnworth uses Claims TV'. This is a comedy video based around a client (Farnworth) being involved in an accident and is now suffering from 'Keepy-Up Syndrome'.

Farnworth also makes guest appearances on Match of the Day Kickabout, showing his skills and tricks.

In 2014 Farnworth made several appearances in support of Football Flick, a popular skill training unit. Recent appearances have featured him participating in weekly installments dubbed 'Trickster Tuesday'.

In 2017, Farnworth appeared in the second series of CBBC series Jamie Johnson, appearing as Theo Bains.

== See also ==
- Freestyle football
- World Freestyle Football Association
