= Ash Randall =

British football freestyler

- Born: 26 June 1989 (age 36); Cardiff, Wales
- Known for: Football Freestyle

Ash Randall (born 26 June 1989) is a British professional football freestyler and twenty-three time Guinness World Record breaker. He is a professional football entertainer, sports coach & Street Football Wales ambassador, who has been nominated for a Proud of Barnsley Award 2020 in the 'Children's Champion' category Best known for his football freestyle, social media videos and world records. Randall also runs the Freestyle Football Academy

== Biography ==
Randall was born in Cardiff, Wales and started playing football at a young age. He joined the Brazilian Soccer Schools, in Cardiff at the age of 16 where he practiced and improved his football ability and control using a size 2 & 5 weighted ball by playing futebol de salao.

At the age of 17 Randall performed his first stage show at the Coal Exchange venue in Cardiff in front of 350 people, it was here he got his first experience of being a performer and the realisation that he could turn his hobby into a career.

Randall attended Ysgol Plasmawr, a Welsh school in Cardiff where he studied Sports & Art.

Since 2010, Randall has achieved twenty-three Guinness World Records and has featured in 4 official Guinness World Records books over the last 10 years.

== Career ==
In 2008 Randall won an online Football Freestyle contest with Pringles by submitting a video performing football skills while implementing the Pringles tub into his routine, by winning the contest he appears in a Pringles Televised commercial alongside Thierry Henry, Fernando Torres, Michael Owen & Dirk Kuyt.

2009 saw Randall appear in a TV Commercial for the Disney XD channel, using huge 360 camera ride and green screen to capture the football skills and celebrations.

Randall broke his 1st Guinness World Record during half time between the Cardiff City F.C. V Watford F.C.game at the Cardiff City Stadium on March 21.

In 2011 Randall took part in the filming of a Bollywood movie directed by Yash Chopra titled Jab Tak Hai Jaan where he featured right alongside accomplished Bollywood actor Shahrukh Khan The film was released in 2012.

In 2012 Randall appeared on ITV prime time show Let's Get Gold where he performed & competed with his freestyle football team SBX Football in attempt to win a cash prize of £100,000. ITV presenter Vernon Kay hosted the show with Rio Ferdinand, Freddie Flintoff, Una Healy and Martine McCutcheon acting as the judging panel.

In 2013 Randall was announced as an ambassador for charity Street Football Wales, other ambassadors for the charity include footballer Ashley Williams & actor Michael Sheen.

Randall was invited to Beijing, China in 2013 to appear on a CCTV1 show titled Zhen da Zong Yi where he broke a Guinness World Record in front of a viewing audience of over 50 million across China, Randall broke the record for 'The most rope skips while juggling a football in 60 seconds'

In 2014 Randall spoke at a TEDx event held at the Wales Millennium Centre in Cardiff, alongside his colleague Tom Connors, where they delivered a talk on growth mindset with a display of football and basketball skills.

In November 2014 Randall set out to set a new Guinness World Record, this time for 'The longest time controlling a football using the soles on the roof of a moving car'- he attempted and set this new record on the runway at Cardiff Airport

Since 2015 Randall has been travelling nationwide visiting schools where he gives inspirational & motivational talks and football skills displays. He also works closely with the children at the schools teaching them the football skills in workshops. Since 2015 Randall has visited over 400 schools around the United Kingdom.

In 2016, Randall featured in a UEFA Euro 2016 campaign & TV commercial for S4C, the commercial was promoting & celebrating Wales playing in the UEFA Euro 2016 football tournament.

In 2016 Randall featured on CBBC TV Show Officially Amazing which was hosted by presenter Ben Shires Randall and his colleague Sean Barnes broke a new Guinness World Record for 'The most crossbar hits from a volley in one minute'

2016 saw a viral video of Randall featuring Manchester United managed Jose Mourinho knock a ball from his head.

In 2017 Randall was a co-producer alongside Nathan Black & a performer in the 'Extremely Comedy' show, throughout 2017 the West End show was taken to various venues such as Leicester Square Theatre, Lowry Theatre, The Albany Theatre & The Embassy Theatre.

On March 1, 2020, Randall was part of Guinness World Records St Davids Day celebrations in partnership with S4C, on this day Randall set 2 new world records in the village of Portmeirion.

== See also ==
- Freestyle football
- World Freestyle Football Association
