= Soufiane Touzani =

Dutch-Moroccan freestyle footballer and TV presenter (born 1986)

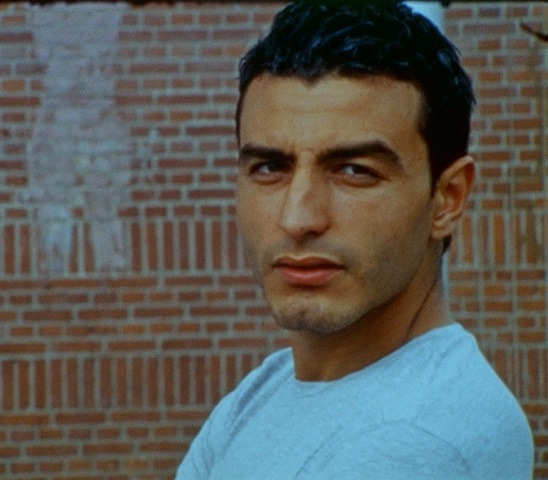
- Born: Soufiane Touzani; 27 October 1986 (age 39); Rotterdam, Netherlands
- Occupations: Presenter and Freestyle Football Player
- Years active: 2004–present
- Known for: Team FC Barcelona
- Website: http://touzanifc.com

Soufiane Touzani (born 27 October 1986) is a Dutch-Moroccan freestyle footballer and television presenter from Rotterdam. In 2008, he uploaded a video on YouTube and this became an international success with millions of views. The video also caught the attention of Electronic Arts (EA Games) and they asked him to perform the tricks for the PlayStation game FIFA Street. Famous football players like Thierry Henry and Robin van Persie watched his videos. Neymar even performed some of his tricks: Touzani Around the World and a trick called “New Shit”. His popularity rose and because of that he received invitations from several countries to show his tricks. He performed worldwide and the pinnacle was a performance with Ronaldinho in a full San Siro Stadium.

== Television ==
Besides playing football Soufiane also has another passion, presenting. The TROS, which is a big television network in the Netherlands, approached him to present the program Z@ppsport. This is a program on national television for children.

== Touzani School ==
In 2011, Soufiane founded his own football school for children in Rotterdam. It’s called Touzani School. Boys learn everything there is to know about football and media.

== Ambassador ==
Soufiane Touzani is the ambassador of the Johan Cruyff Foundation. Together they try to stimulate sports among children on the Cruyff Courts.

Soufiane Touzani is also the ambassador of the city Rotterdam. By conducting several clinics and his cooperation with topsport events, Soufiane delivers his contribution to the development of the topsports climate in Rotterdam.

== Highlights ==
=== Fifastreet ===
Right after a wave of popularity of his First Freestyle video, Soufiane was asked by Electronic Arts to do the motion capture movements for the game FIFA Street. In the second part of FIFA Street he got his own character in the game.

=== Stade de France ===
One of the First highlights of Soufiane’s career was a performance during the French Cup final in the Stade de France. He performed in front of 80.000 spectators.

=== Ronaldinho ===
After a first performance at AC Milan, Soufiane was asked for a second time. This time at the presentation of acclaimed player Ronaldinho. Soufiane got the chance to perform together with Ronaldinho.

=== Robin van Persie 3VS3 ===
Every year the Robin van Persie Tournament takes place. In 2013, the tournament became a special edition. Feyenoord player Tonny Vilhena and Soufiane Touzani played a match of 3 versus 3 with none other than Robin van Persie. Three lucky kids played the game of a lifetime. It resulted in one of the most spectacular football videos on YouTube in 2013.

=== Coronation of the King ===
Soufiane was given the honour of performing at the coronation of the new King of the Netherlands. After the inauguration in the church, the King and his family went on a boat tour. During this tour Soufiane showed the most spectacular tricks for the King, his Queen and the three princesses.

== Setback ==
He dreamed of becoming a professional football player. But when he was sixteen years old, it turned out he had a deviation to his back. This scoliosis was the reason for putting an iron pin of 30 centimeters in his back. As a result he was only allowed to play keepy-uppy. He found out that he had some exceptional skills, while doing this.

== See also ==
- Freestyle football
- World Freestyle Football Association
- Ricardo Chahini
