= Mr. Wu =

Mr. Wu may refer to:

- Mr. Wu, a 1918 book by Louise Jordan Miln
- Mr. Wu (1919 film), a British drama film
- Mr. Wu (1927 film), an American silent film starring Lon Chaney
- Mr. Wu, a character referred to in several songs of the 1930s and 1940s by George Formby
- Mr. Wu, a character from the TV series Deadwood
- Mr. Wu, a character from the TV series American Horror Story
- Mr. Wu, a character from the 2012 film Men in Black 3
- Mr. Wu, a character from the TV series Benidorm

== See also ==
- Woo Hee-young (AKA Mr. Woo, born 1963), Freestyle Football player from South Korea
- Masta Wu (born 1978), Korean rapper
- Wu (disambiguation)
  - Wu (surname)
