= Rozeboom =

Rozeboom is a Dutch toponymic surname meaning "rose tree". The variant spellings Rooseboom, Roosenboom, Rosenboom, Roozeboom, Roseboom, Rozeboom, and Rozenboom are pronounced similarly in Dutch ([roː(s/z)əboːm]). People with these surnames include:

- Christian Rozeboom (born 1997), American football player
- Daniel Rooseboom de Vries (born 1980), Dutch freestyle footballer
- David Rosenboom (born 1947), American composer
- Hendrik Willem Bakhuis Roozeboom (1854–1907), Dutch physical chemist
- Ken Rozenboom (born 1951), American politician from Iowa
- Lance Rozeboom (born 1989), American soccer player
- Margaretha Roosenboom (1843–1896), Dutch flower painter, daughter of Nicolaas
- Nicolaas Johannes Roosenboom (1805–1880), Dutch landscape painter and printmaker
- Teddy Roseboom (1896–1980), English football player
- Thomas Rosenboom (born 1956), Dutch novelist and short story author
- Willem Rooseboom (1843–1920), Dutch Major General of the Dutch East Indies

== See also ==
- SS Rooseboom, a Dutch steam ship named after Willem Rooseboom that was sunk by the Japanese near Sumatra in 1942
- Rosenbaum, cognate German and Yiddish surname
