= Simon Clifford =

English football coach

Personal information
- Full name: Simon Darcy Clifford
- Date of birth: November, 1970 (55)
- Place of birth: Loftus, England

Managerial career
- Years: Team
- 2004–2009: Garforth Town

Simon Darcy Clifford is an English football coach and businessman, known for introducing Brazilian training techniques into the UK through his Brazilian Soccer Schools. Clifford has worked in football for over 30 years, from youth to senior squads and from non-league to Premier League teams, with various clubs and individual professional players.

Clifford teaches young football players through his coaching company, Integer Football, which is based in Yorkshire, England. He has worked with many young players, including future professionals like Micah Richards, who went on to play in the Premier League and for England’s national team, and Tottenham Hotspur's Archie Gray.

== Early life and career ==
Brought up in Loftus in the North Riding of Yorkshire, Clifford moved to Leeds to study at the age of eighteen. It was there that he later started his teaching career in a primary school. He began training the children of the school using techniques derived from Brazilian football. Shortly after, he began an after school club that would become the first of a now worldwide chain of soccer schools. In 1997, he borrowed £5000 from a teachers' union to fund a trip to Brazil, where he spoke with former Brazilian players, and watched Brazilian coaching methods whilst spending time residing at the training ground of São Paulo FC. Having held discussions with Brazilian midfielder and friend Juninho during his time at Middlesbrough, Clifford created a syllabus to use for his coaching.

== Brazilian soccer school and SOCATOTS ==
In 1997, Clifford started a Brazilian-style soccer school for youngsters in Leeds, teaching Brazilian skills as well as introducing his students to futebol de salão. Clifford became the first coach to bring over and popularise futsal in the United Kingdom. Clifford then started training young footballers with his new methods, preferring to concentrate on improving ball skills and close control and an even greater emphasis on fitness and physical strength.

The Brazilian Soccer Schools have been endorsed by many in football, including Sir Trevor Brooking, Tord Grip and Michael Owen. In 2001 Clifford introduced his pre-school coaching programme SOCATOTS. Visiting clubs such as Everton F.C., Manchester United F.C., Newcastle United F.C. and West Ham United F.C. in the late 1990s, Clifford aimed to help develop futsal within these clubs, and subsequently English football.

Players such as Micah Richards and John Bostock were some of the most successful graduates in the early years. A number of young players today have a background in futebol de salao, including Charlie Patino, Charlie Webster and Archie Gray, with all three captaining the England national team at their respective age groups. Clifford sold the Brazilian Soccer Schools and SOCATOTS franchise to then Southampton FC chairman Rupert Lowe in 2012.

== Career in professional football ==
Clifford entered the professional scene when recruited by Sir Clive Woodward in December 2004, with the long term plan being to become his assistant coach at Southampton. Woodward met with Clifford before they went into football together to learn from the methods he was using and to look at the work he was doing with the soccer schools. Clifford was appointed Head of Sport Science and head coach of the U21s, working with a crop of youth team players that included Gareth Bale, Nathan Dwyer, Theo Walcott and more. After falling out with the coaching establishment at Southampton and leaving his role, he returned to the non-league club he owned, Garforth Town, as manager.

In 2003 Clifford purchased the Northern Counties East Football League club Garforth Town. At the time of the purchase, Clifford expressed the desire to take the club, then at the ninth level of the football pyramid, into the English Football League within twenty years. The club gained two promotions during Clifford's first two full seasons as manager. Within the six years, they managed to reach the EvoStik Premier League - the highest level in the clubs' history. Clifford signed several well-known players including: Lee Sharpe, Sócrates and Careca.

In April 2009, Garforth reached the final of the West Riding County Cup to face Bradford Park Avenue. Garforth won 5-4 on penalties to claim the cup. After three seasons of managing Garforth Town, Clifford made the decision to step aside as manager of his club.

In September 2008, Clifford was approached by a South African consortium looking to purchase Newcastle United Football Club, with the party offering the 38-year-old a role as technical director as well as shares in the club.

In 2017, Clifford began working within HN Sports agency, and in 2019 moved to Blue Sky Sports football agency. Clifford has worked with Blue Sky Sports since its inception, in the role of elite performance coach.

== Integer Football ==
In 2015, Clifford started his latest venture with the creation of Integer Football - a one-to-one training programme.

In September 2024, Clifford and Integer Football featured in a Sky Sports documentary on Archie Gray; he was interviewed regarding his work with Archie, and Gray's development.

Recent notable successes for Integer Football graduates include Archie Gray becoming the youngest Leeds United player to reach 50 appearances, Ryan Edmondson winning the A-League in his debut season in Australia and Kian Spence being named Barrow's Young Player of the Season.

== Notable graduates ==
Notable players who have graduated from Clifford's BSS system and syllabus include Micah Richards (ex-Manchester City and England defender), John Farnworth (British Football Freestyler), Ryan Edmondson (Central Coast Mariners), Stanley Mills (Oxford United) Ryan Fraser (Southampton and Scotland), Renny Smith (Oxford City), Harry Leonard (Blackburn Rovers FC), Robbie Gotts (Barrow AFC), Charlie Webster (Burton Albion), Liam Kitching (Coventry City), Oli McBurnie (Las Palmas) and Archie Gray (Tottenham Hotspur).

Notable coaches have also graduated from Clifford's system, including John Herdman (Toronto FC), Michael Beale (former assistant coach at Al-Ettifaq) and Beverly Priestman (former manager of Canada women's national team).

== Work in TV, film and media ==
Clifford has been involved in a number of TV and film productions, working with directors and actors in various roles. He worked as technical coach for the lead actresses of Bend It Like Beckham, Keira Knightley and Parminder Nagra. Clifford also performed the same role in the film There's Only One Jimmy Grimble with Robert Carlyle and Ray Winstone, and on Kicking and Screaming with Will Ferrell. He choreographed, coached and advised on the film The Damned United, starring Michael Sheen.

Clifford was choreographer and coach for Julian Fellowes' Netflix series The English Game.

Clifford has also worked on his own TV documentaries, DVDs and books, individually and in collaboration with others. Such work includes Learn to Play the Brazilian Way, Soccer Superskills With Jay-Jay Okocha, Michael Owen's Soccer Skills, Soccer Super Skills, A Whole New Ball Game (BBC) and Boys to Brazil (BBC).

== Other work ==
In May 2011, Clifford was made an official Yorkshire Patron for his work promoting the region around the world.
