= Touzani =

Touzani (Arabic: توزاني) is a Moroccan surname. Notable people with the surname include:

- Karim Touzani (born 1980), Dutch retired footballer of Moroccan descent
- Maryam Touzani (born 1980), Moroccan filmmaker and actress
- Soufiane Touzani (born 1986), Dutch-Moroccan freestyle footballer and television host, brother of Karim
