= Pierre Daher =

Hungarian politician (born 1960)

Member of the National Assembly
- In office 28 June 2010 – 5 May 2014

Personal details
- Born: 10 July 1960 (age 65) Lebanon
- Party: Fidesz (until 2015)
- Profession: Physician, politician

Chakib Pierre Daher (Arabic: بيار شكيب ظاهر; born 10 July 1960) is a Hungarian physician and politician of Lebanese descent, member of the National Assembly (MP) from Borsod-Abaúj-Zemplén County Regional List from 2010 to 2014. He had been a member of the Committee on Health Affairs from 5 July 2010 to 5 May 2014 and Committee on Foreign Affairs between 28 February 2011 and 23 September 2013.

== Biography ==
Pierre Daher was born near to the Israel-Lebanon border into a Maronite Catholic family on 10 July 1960. He studied as a construction engineer in Beirut, but later turned to the medicine, when moved to Brussels in 1981. He went to Budapest because of financial problems, where his brother, Ziad learnt. Later their younger brother, Paul also started his studies here. Pierre finished higher education at Semmelweis University (SOTE) and started work for the hospital in Miskolc as a surgeon. Since 1996 he practiced as a GP in Szendrőlád. He became a Hungarian citizen in 2000. He served as head of the consulting room in Edelény since that time. He became a member of the local representative body in 2002, as a member of the Fidesz. Since 2008 he is the director of the Koch Róbert Hospital in Edelény.

He ran for the parliamentary seat for Edelény in the 2010 general elections, but former Fidesz member and independent candidate, Oszkár Molnár defeated him. However Pierre Daher became Member of Parliament from county list a month later, when replaced Ildikó Pelczné Gáll, who was appointed Member of the European Parliament (replacing Pál Schmitt).

When the national board of Fidesz dissolved its local organization in Edelény due to internal conflicts in May 2015, Daher did not apply to join the re-established branch after his local rival Balázs Loj was elected chairman, thus his party membership officially ceased in October 2015.
