= Sajószentpéter =

- Town
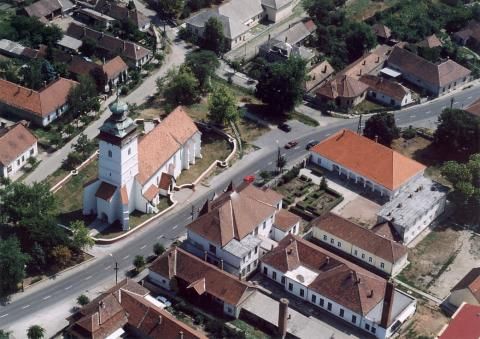
- Aerial view

- Flag Coat of arms

- Location within Hungary
- Coordinates: 48.21715°N 20.71852°E
- Country: Hungary
- County: Borsod-Abaúj-Zemplén
- District: Kazincbarcika

Area
  - Total: 380.26 km^{2} (146.82 sq mi)

Population (2015)
  - Total: 11,679
  - Density: 383/km^{2} (990/sq mi)
- Time zone: UTC+1 (CET)
  - Summer (DST): UTC+2 (CEST)
- Postal code: 3770
- Area code: (+36) 48
- Website: www.sajoszentpeter.hu

Sajószentpéter (German: Sankt Peter; Latin: Villa Sancti Petri) is a town in Borsod-Abaúj-Zemplén County, Northern Hungary. It lies in the Miskolc–Kazincbarcika agglomeration, 10 kilometres away from the county capital.

== History ==
The town was mentioned first in 1281 as Szentpéter (St. Peter). It got the first part of its name later, from the river Sajó. The town was owned by the king, it belonged first to the Castle of Diósgyőr, then to the Dédes estate. During the Hussite fights the town was destroyed. It was built again after 1466 but got its town status back only in 1989.

In the 17th–18th century the town was owned by several important noble families, among them the Rákóczi and the Losonczy families.

In the 19th century, the formerly agricultural village transformed into an industrial one with the opening of coal mines and the construction of a glass factory. Located midway between two of the area's largest industrial cities, Sajószentpéter could not avoid increasing industrialization during the Socialist era. However, like in other cities and towns in Northern Hungary, the industry faced a crisis following the fall of the Socialist regime, and unemployment became one of the most significant problems.

== Sights ==
- Reformed Great Church
- Birthplace of József Lévay
- Country museum
- Gallery

== Notable people ==
- Sigismund Rákóczi (1544–1608), Prince of Transylvania (1607–1608)
- Lea Gottlieb (1918–2012), Israeli fashion designer and founder of Gottex
- János Koszta (born 1959), footballer
- Oszkár Molnár (born 1956), politician
- Anikó Nagy (born 1970), handball player
- Chaim Sofer (1821–1886), rabbi
- István Varga (born 1956), politician and economist
- Sándor Pécsi (1922–1972), actor
- Kitti Szász, Hungarian freestyle football world champion

== Twin towns – sister cities ==
Sajószentpéter is twinned with:

- Dobšiná, Slovakia
- Kobiór, Poland

== Sport ==
The most notable association football club was the Borsodi Bányász SE playing in the Nemzeti Bajnokság II and III. The club's most notable success was achieved in 1949 by winning the 1948–49 Nemzeti Bajnokság III season.
