= Lia Lewis =

English freestyle footballer

Personal information
- Full name: Lia Lewis Gribius
- Born: 9 July 1997 (age 29) London, England
- Education: Trinity Laban Conservatoire of Music and Dance
- Occupations: Competitor and ambassador
- Years active: 2018–present
- Height: 5 ft 5 in (165 cm)
- Other interests: Ballet and contemporary dance

Sport
- Sport: Freestyle football
- Partner: Mauricio Doehner
Medal record
Women's freestyle football
Representing United Kingdom
Event	1st	2nd	3rd
Red Bull Street Style	1	–	–
Super Ball	–	1	–
Total	1	1	0
Gold medal – first place	2021 Valencia	freestyle football women's
Silver medal – second place	2021 Prague	freestyle football women's

Lia Lewis Gribius (born 9 July 1997) is an English freestyle football competitor and association football global ambassador who was raised in France. Having trained in dance most of her youth, she took up freestyle football in her 20s and became a world champion.

== Background ==
According to her talent agency profile, Lewis was born in London and raised in the Brittany region of France. She was a competitive dancer from approximately 2010 to 2018. Since her mother wanted to raise bilingual children, she moved with her parents, Stéphane, a businessman, and Karen (née Lewis) Gribius, an interior designer, to Baden near the Gulf of Morbihan in 2001. She has two siblings, Emily and Alexander. Her maternal grandparents are Irish (grandmother) and Welsh (grandfather). Her father is French.

== Career ==
Growing up, Lewis never participated in any sports involving a ball. She studied ballet and contemporary dance for 18 years. After struggling to make it in the dance world, she left the Trinity Laban Conservatoire of Music and Dance in London at age 21 and switched to freestyle football in 2018. In 2020, she finished fourth in the Red Bull Street Style Freestyle Football World Championship. Starting in September 2020, she was featured in a weekly skills guide on the CIC sports show on a Welsh language S4C every Friday. During the COVID-19 lockdowns in December 2020 and January 2021, Lewis participated in the Amazon-sponsored Very Important Breakfast Club by giving e-visit lessons at schools in Doncaster, Poole, Brent, Scunthorpe and Edinburgh that could be subsequently viewed on the Amazon.co.uk YouTube channel.

In January 2021, Vanity Fair dubbed her freestyle football's rising star. Lewis partnered with Pringles for the brand's football campaign in Summer 2021 by creating a trick with an empty Pringles can. In August 2021, Lewis was runner-up to Aguśka Mnich in the 2021 Super Ball tournament. In November 2021, London-based Lewis, who represents the United Kingdom during international competitions, became the Red Bull Street Style Freestyle Football World Champion. In 2022, she won a Freestyle World Championship and partnered with Supa Strikas for a YouTube series. In February 2023, she became an ambassador/spokesperson for the 2023 FIFA Women's World Cup as the dedicated skills coach of its World Cup Trophy Tour, that visited all 32 participating nations.
