= Daniel Rooseboom de Vries =

Dutch freestyle footballer

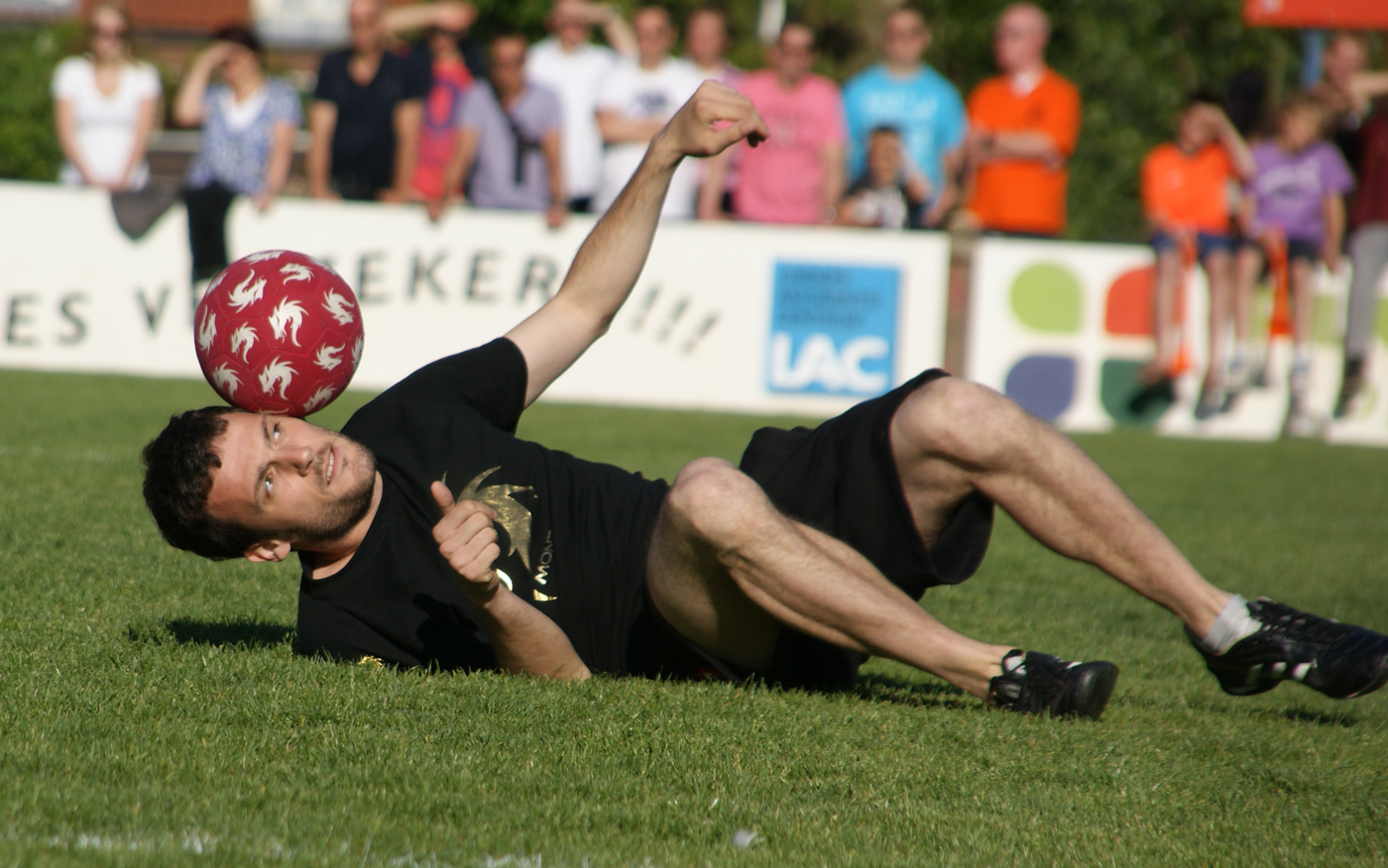
Daniel Rooseboom de Vries

Daniel Rooseboom de Vries (born 12 August 1980) is a Dutch freestyle footballer from Gorinchem, Netherlands.

In 2008, de Vries came third in the Redbull Street Style Freestyle European Championship in Austria, later reaching the Quarterfinals of the World Championship in Brazil. Additionally, he won the national Dutch Championships in 2009.

In 2011, he decided to focus on organising and judging tournaments instead of competing. Daniel was the Head Judge in both the Open World Championships and Red Bull Street Style 2012 and 2013.

Daniel has performed in more than 40 countries, reaching three cup finals and appearing on several TV shows. He is one of the main characters in the Football Freestyle DVD 'CERO2. Furthermore, he appeared in a commercial of a software company SAP and is the face of the worldwide Redbull Street Style campaign. In 2012 he got his own character in the video game FIFA Street 4. Daniel is the Head of Digital at World Freestyle Football Association.

He is sponsored by the Dutch clothing brands Montasoccer and Arise Sportswear.

Throughout the years de Vries has created his own style with signature tricks like the "clock", where he puts the ball on the side of his head, lies on the floor and walks around like a ticking clock.

Nowadays he lives in Sweden, performing all around the country while remaining a well-known street artist in Stockholm.
