= Yehuda Shinar =

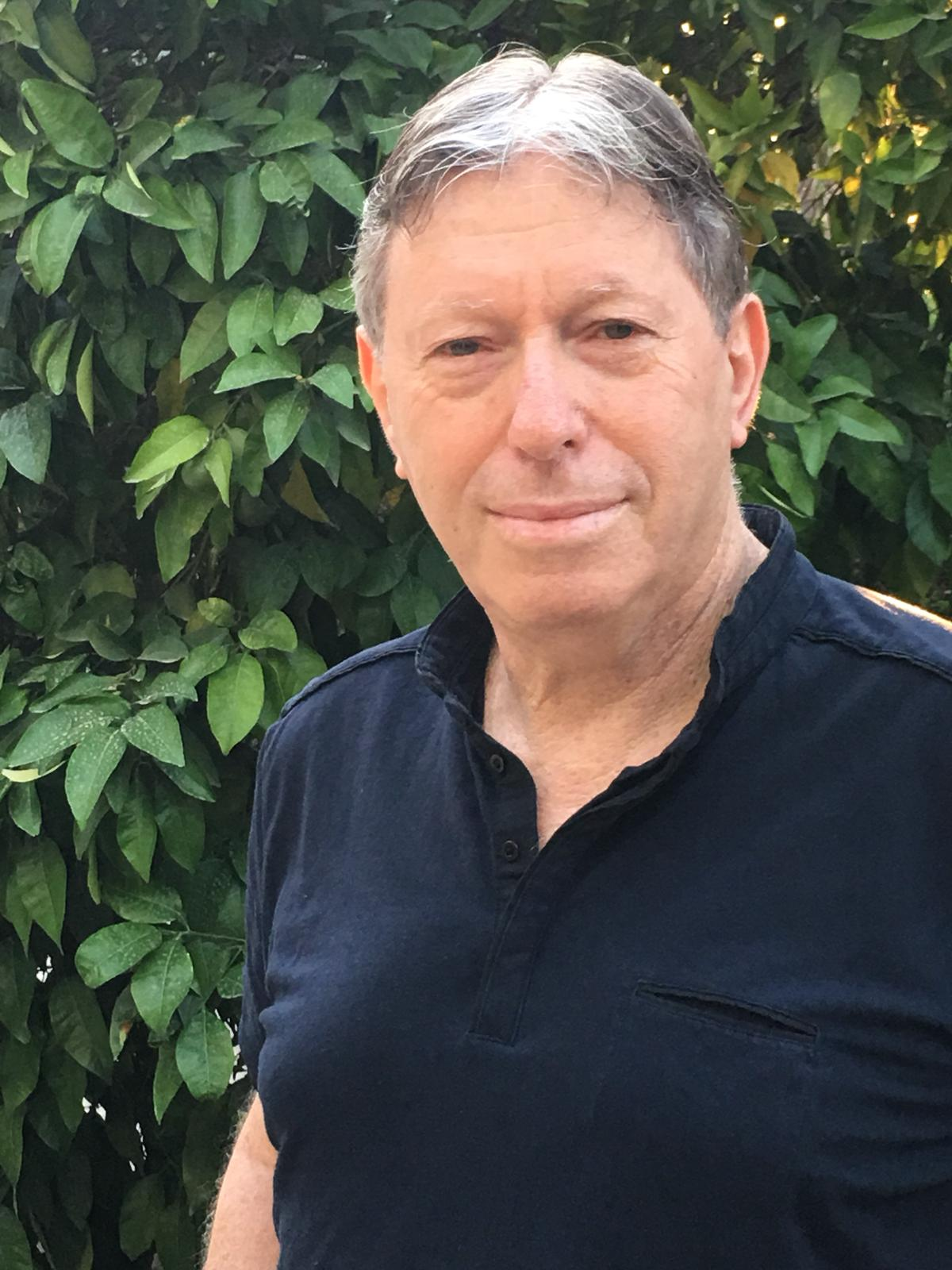
Yehuda Shinar

Yehuda Shinar (Hebrew: יהודה שנער) is a graphologist, life coach, and the owner and CEO of the Shinar Institute, established in Israel in 1976. The institute's expertise is in analyzing and evaluating job candidates for managerial positions throughout the world.

In 1996, Shinar established Winning Enterprises Ltd after studying and investigating how some people seem to achieve a lot in their lives and others do not, especially in the sporting arena. Shinar and his colleagues used this information to develop a strategy for winning, focusing on their way of thinking, decision making dynamic and their one-on-one strategies.

In the sporting world, Shinar has worked with Sir Clive Woodward of the England rugby team, helping them to win the Rugby World Cup, Tony Falkner of Blackburn Rovers, helping them to win the National Academy League, and the Maccabi Tel Aviv football club to help them qualify for the UEFA Champions League in 2004-2005.

Shinar is also involved in lecturing and fostering winning strategies to organizations within Israel and abroad, including the Royal Bank of Scotland, the Scottish Institute of Sport, Capital Radio and Nat West.

== Bibliography ==
- Shinar, Yehuda (September 2007). Think Like a Winner. Vermilion. ISBN 978-0-09-191290-1.

He has an official website https://winningcenter.com/
