= Kitti Szász =

Kitti Szász (Born August 1991, Kazincbarcika, Hungary) is a Hungarian freestyle football juggler. She majored in sports organization from the Eszterházy Károly College. As of 2014 she resided in Sajószentpéter.As of 2020 she is a member of Face Team acrobatic sports theatre, Budapest.

She is four times world champion (2011, Prague, 2012 Lecce, 2013 Tokyo, 2014 Liberec) and a European champion (2013, Budapest).

In 2017, she became a Guinness World Record holder performing 107 heel kicks in one minute, breaking the previous record of 102 heel kicks by Indi Cowie. In 2020 she beat her record with 110 kicks.
