= Clive Woodward =

British rugby union player and coach

Sir Clive Woodward OBE
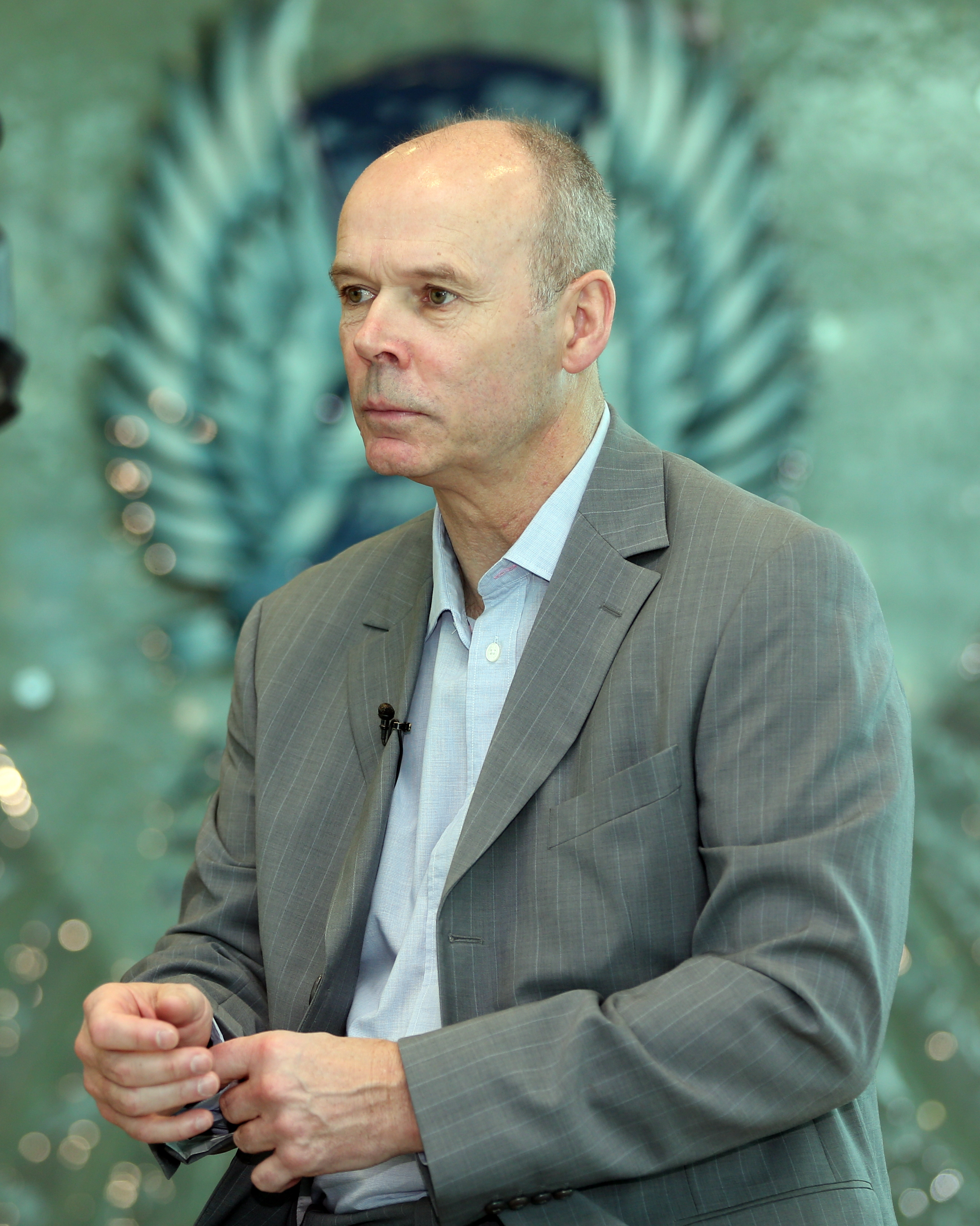
- Born: Clive Ronald Woodward; 6 January 1956 (age 70) Ely, Cambridgeshire, England
- Height: 5 ft 11 in (180 cm)
- Weight: 12 st 8 lb; 176 lb (80 kg)
- School: HMS Conway Naval School
- University: Loughborough University
- Occupation: Part-time pundit

Rugby union career
- Position: Centre
Amateur team(s)
Years	Team	Apps	(Points)
1974	Harlequins		
1977–1979	Loughborough		
1979–1985	Leicester Tigers		
1985–1990	Manly		
- Correct as of 13 September 2006
International career
Years	Team	Apps	(Points)
1980–1984	England	21	(16)
1980, 1983	British & Irish Lions	2	(0)
- Correct as of 14 September 2006
Coaching career
- Years: Team
- 1990–1994: Henley
- 1994–1997: London Irish
- 1994–1997: England U21
- 1997: Bath
- 1997–2004: England
- 2005: British & Irish Lions
- Correct as of 26 October 2006

Sir Clive Ronald Woodward OBE (born 6 January 1956) is an English former rugby union player and coach. He was coach of the England team from 1997 to 2004, managing them to victory in the 2003 Rugby World Cup. He also coached the 2005 British & Irish Lions tour to New Zealand, losing the test series 3–0. He is currently a pundit for ITV Sport, working on their coverage of the Six Nations and Rugby World Cup.

== Early life ==
Woodward was born in Ely, Cambridgeshire, the son of an RAF pilot. He started school at Corstorphine in Edinburgh and was later sent to the school ship HMS Conway, as his father disapproved of his ambition to play professional football. At Conway, he played rugby union at centre alongside fly-half Iain Duncan Smith, who would later become leader of the Conservative Party. According to Woodward, he was not selected to play for the Welsh Schoolboys side because he was English, but he was good enough to play rugby union for a Welsh school.

According to his autobiography, he applied to do a law degree at Durham University, but was turned down even though he was good enough and instead, he found a job at a London bank (NatWest).

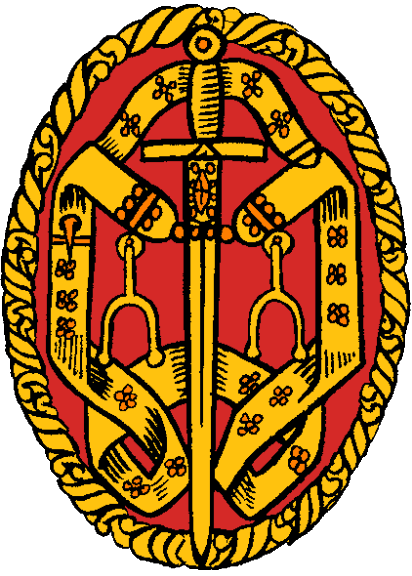
Insignia of Knight Bachelor

== Playing career ==
His first club was Harlequins but he left to go to Loughborough University where he gained a Bachelor of Science degree in sports science followed by a Postgraduate Certificate in Education (PGCE). He then played as a centre for Leicester from 1979 to 1985. He made his England debut against Ireland on 19 January 1980, as a replacement. England won the Grand Slam in that season, winning all their games. He went on to gain 21 caps for his country, playing his last game on 17 March 1984 against Wales. He was a player on the British Lions' 1980 tour to South Africa and 1983 tour to New Zealand. He was most noted for his centre partnership with fellow Tiger Paul Dodge. Playing for the Barbarians, he also won the Hong Kong Sevens in 1981.

== Rugby coaching career ==
He returned to the UK in 1990 to start his own IT leasing company and he became coach of the then obscure Henley Hawks, who were promoted to the national leagues. After a short but successful spell of coaching at London Irish. He became assistant coach at Leicester's arch rivals Bath under Andy Robinson.

When Jack Rowell retired as coach of the England team in 1997, Woodward acquired the job. He had the job of transforming the England side from the amateur era into the professional one. Having been quoted as requesting that the press judge him on England's performance at the 1999 Rugby World Cup, when they were beaten by South Africa, his job was questioned. Thereafter England steadily improved under Woodward. England were Six Nations champions in 2000 and 2001, and completed the Grand Slam in 2003 with an emphatic 42–6 victory over Ireland in Dublin. England followed up by defeating the All Blacks in New Zealand for the first time since 1973, holding out for a 15–13 win despite being reduced to 13 men in the second half with two forwards in the sin bin. A week later reigning world champions Australia were beaten 25–14 in Melbourne, England's first ever win on Australian soil.

England entered the 2003 Rugby World Cup as betting favourites and the number one ranked team in the world. Victories over Georgia, South Africa, Samoa, Uruguay, Wales and France took England to the final, where they faced the hosts and reigning champions Australia. England won 20–17 thanks to a Jonny Wilkinson drop goal in the final seconds of extra time. Woodward was knighted in the 2004 New Year's honours. From 2000 to 2003, Woodward's England compiled a record of 41 wins from 46 matches, which included a perfect record of 20 wins and no losses at Twickenham and 12 successive wins against the Tri Nations. England remain the only team from the Northern Hemisphere to have won the World Cup.

The England squad had to be re-built after the World Cup success, as a number of senior players retired, including captain Martin Johnson. Meanwhile, talismanic fly-half Jonny Wilkinson was sidelined with long-term injuries which would prevent him playing for England again for almost 4 years. England came third in the 2004 Six Nations, losing to Grand Slam winners France and Triple Crown winners Ireland. His last tour as England coach came shortly afterwards, with an ill-fated tour of New Zealand and Australia. England were beaten by New Zealand in two tests, without scoring a single try, going down 36–3 in the first and 36–12 in the second. The team then went to Australia, where they were beaten 51–15.

In February 2004 he was appointed head coach for the 2005 British & Irish Lions tour to New Zealand. The Lions lost the test series 3–0. Woodward's management was criticised by many commentators and players for his initial squad selection, his coaching methods, his handling of the players and the media, his selections on tour – particularly for keeping faith with the England players he knew well – and for not allowing the test team any time to play together before the test series began. He returned from New Zealand with his reputation within rugby severely tarnished.

On 24 October 2011, Woodward was inducted into the IRB Hall of Fame, alongside all other Rugby World Cup-winning head coaches and captains from the tournament's inception in 1987 through 2007 (minus the previously inducted John Eales).

== Resignation and football coaching ==
Woodward's contract with England was due to run until 2007. Following the retirement of key players like Lawrence Dallaglio and Martin Johnson, and finishing third in the Six Nations after the World Cup success, he found the politics of English rugby difficult to deal with, particularly the Premiership clubs' relations with the England management. Woodward was linked with a switch to football and, although he had denied these rumours, on 1 September 2004, Woodward announced that he would be quitting as England coach.

Initially, a move to Southampton Football Club seemed likely, as Woodward was a friend of chairman Rupert Lowe. Lowe discussed this possibility with the club's board on 2 September 2004. However, in his resignation press conference, Woodward said that his intention was to take the Football Association's Grade Two coaching badges after the 2005 British & Irish Lions tour to New Zealand:

I'm interested in, I intend to do the awards but I may end up coaching Maidenhead under-nines. You have to start at the bottom and I intend to do that.

However, Woodward continued his move into the Football League in 2005 by becoming Performance Director at Southampton Football Club, without undertaking any coaching at non-league clubs. With no experience of professional football, he again had problems with the politics of the situation, and was widely believed to have had a difficult relationship with the club's then-manager Harry Redknapp. For example, his appointee as head of sports science, Simon Clifford, left the club in November 2005, after only two months, amid resentment from the club's existing staff.

Following the departure of Redknapp in December 2005, Woodward was suggested as a possible candidate for the manager's position at the Championship club, despite his lack of experience in the game. He was subsequently appointed Director of Football to work alongside newly appointed Head Coach, George Burley. On 31 August 2006 it was confirmed by Southampton that he was no longer working at the club.

== British Olympic Association ==
On 6 September 2006 it was announced that Woodward would be returning to sport as the new director of elite performance for the British Olympic Association. This is a role similar to that for which he was believed to be a candidate at his former employers the Rugby Football Union (Rob Andrew was eventually appointed to the position).

In 2007, he was appointed to the board of directors of Leicester Tigers as a non-executive director.

On 6 March 2008, he had the privilege to run with the Olympic torch while going through Russell Square, London.

At the 2008 Summer Olympics in Beijing he acted as Deputy Chef de Mission and undertook a review of practices at the games in preparation for 2012 Summer Olympics in London.

It was announced on 4 October 2012 that Woodward would leave his post as director of sport at the British Olympic Association after six years.

== Books ==
Woodward released his autobiography, Winning!, in 2004. He writes of the triumph of England in the 2003 Rugby World Cup, the preparations and celebrations, and of his personal life, his playing and coaching career. In Winning!, Woodward refers to Yehuda Shinar as one of the people who helped to turn the team around and who helped them win the World Cup. A biography of him, Clive Woodward: the biography, written by Alison Kervin, was published six months later.

== Charity ==
Woodward is an Honorary President of the Wooden Spoon Society, a children's charity that harnesses the support of the rugby world. Woodward played in the annual Gary Player Invitational charity golf tournament to assist golf icon Gary Player raise funds for various children's causes.

== Personal life ==
Clive Woodward is married to Jayne Williams; the couple formerly ran a computer leasing business together. They live near Maidenhead. Woodward was made an Honorary Doctor of Technology (Hon DTech) by his alma mater, Loughborough University in 2004.

== International matches as head coach ==
Note: World Rankings Column shows the World Ranking England was placed at on the following Monday after each of their matches

Matches (1997–2004)
Matches	Date	Opposition	Venue	Score (Eng.–Opponent)	Competition	Captain	World Rank
1997
1	15 November	Australia	Twickenham, London	15–15	Autumn Internationals	Lawrence Dallaglio	N/A
2	22 November	New Zealand	Old Trafford, Manchester	8–25	Autumn Internationals	Lawrence Dallaglio	N/A
3	29 November	South Africa	Twickenham, London	11–29	Autumn Internationals	Lawrence Dallaglio	N/A
4	6 December	New Zealand	Twickenham, London	26–26	Autumn Internationals	Lawrence Dallaglio	N/A
1998
5	7 February	France	Stade de France, Saint-Denis	17–24	1998 Five Nations	Lawrence Dallaglio	N/A
6	21 February	Wales	Twickenham, London	60–26	1998 Five Nations	Lawrence Dallaglio	N/A
7	22 March	Scotland	Murrayfield, Edinburgh	34–20	1998 Five Nations	Lawrence Dallaglio	N/A
8	4 April	Ireland	Twickenham, London	35–17	1998 Five Nations	Lawrence Dallaglio	N/A
9	6 June	Australia	Lang Park, Brisbane	0–76	1998 tour	Tony Diprose	N/A
10	20 June	New Zealand	Carisbrook, Dunedin	22–64	1998 tour	Matt Dawson	N/A
11	27 June	New Zealand	Eden Park, Auckland	10–40	1998 tour	Matt Dawson	N/A
12	4 July	South Africa	Newlands, Cape Town	0–18	1998 tour	Matt Dawson	N/A
13	14 November	Netherlands	McAlpine Stadium, Huddersfield	110–0	1999 Rugby World Cup qualification	Martin Johnson	N/A
14	22 November	Italy	McAlpine Stadium, Huddersfield	23–15	1999 Rugby World Cup qualification	Martin Johnson	N/A
15	28 November	Australia	Twickenham, London	11–12	Autumn Internationals	Lawrence Dallaglio	N/A
16	5 December	South Africa	Twickenham, London	13–7	Autumn Internationals	Lawrence Dallaglio	N/A
1999
17	20 February	Scotland	Twickenham, London	24–21	1999 Five Nations	Lawrence Dallaglio	N/A
18	6 March	Ireland	Lansdowne Road, Dublin	27–15	1999 Five Nations	Lawrence Dallaglio	N/A
19	20 March	France	Twickenham, London	21–10	1999 Five Nations	Lawrence Dallaglio	N/A
20	11 April	Wales	Wembley Stadium, London	31–32	1999 Five Nations	Lawrence Dallaglio	N/A
21	26 June	Australia	Stadium Australia, Sydney	15–22	1999 tour	Martin Johnson	N/A
22	21 August	United States	Twickenham, London	106–8	Warm-up matches	Martin Johnson	N/A
23	28 August	Canada	Twickenham, London	36–11	Warm-up matches	Martin Johnson	N/A
24	2 October	Italy	Twickenham, London	67–7	1999 Rugby World Cup	Martin Johnson	N/A
25	9 October	New Zealand	Twickenham, London	16–30	1999 Rugby World Cup	Martin Johnson	N/A
26	15 October	Tonga	Twickenham, London	101–10	1999 Rugby World Cup	Martin Johnson	N/A
27	20 October	Fiji	Twickenham, London	45–24	1999 Rugby World Cup	Martin Johnson	N/A
28	24 October	South Africa	Stade de France, Saint-Denis	21–44	1999 Rugby World Cup	Martin Johnson	N/A
2000
29	5 February	Ireland	Twickenham, London	50–18	2000 Six Nations	Matt Dawson	N/A
30	19 February	France	Stade de France, Saint-Denis	15–9	2000 Six Nations	Matt Dawson	N/A
31	4 March	Wales	Twickenham, London	46–12	2000 Six Nations	Matt Dawson	N/A
32	18 March	Italy	Stadio Flaminio, Rome	59–12	2000 Six Nations	Matt Dawson	N/A
33	2 April	Scotland	Murrayfield, Edinburgh	13–19	2000 Six Nations	Matt Dawson	N/A
34	17 June	South Africa	Loftus Versfeld Stadium, Pretoria	13–18	2000 tour	Martin Johnson	N/A
35	24 June	South Africa	Free State Stadium, Bloemfontein	27–22	2000 tour	Martin Johnson	N/A
36	18 November	Australia	Twickenham, London	22–19	Autumn Internationals	Martin Johnson	N/A
37	25 November	Argentina	Twickenham, London	19–0	Autumn Internationals	Martin Johnson	N/A
38	2 December	South Africa	Twickenham, London	25–17	Autumn Internationals	Martin Johnson	N/A
2001
39	3 February	Wales	Millennium Stadium, Cardiff	44–15	2001 Six Nations	Martin Johnson	N/A
40	17 February	Italy	Twickenham, London	80–23	2001 Six Nations	Martin Johnson	N/A
41	3 March	Scotland	Twickenham, London	43–3	2001 Six Nations	Martin Johnson	N/A
42	7 April	France	Twickenham, London	48–19	2001 Six Nations	Martin Johnson	N/A
43	2 June	Canada	Fletcher's Fields, Markham	22–10	2001 tour	Kyran Bracken	N/A
44	9 June	Canada	Swangard Stadium, Burnaby	59–20	2001 tour	Kyran Bracken	N/A
45	16 June	United States	Balboa Stadium, San Diego	48–19	2001 tour	Kyran Bracken	N/A
46	20 October	Ireland	Lansdowne Road, Dublin	14–20	2001 Six Nations	Matt Dawson	N/A
47	10 November	Australia	Twickenham, London	21–15	Autumn Internationals	Neil Back	N/A
48	17 November	Romania	Twickenham, London	134–0	Autumn Internationals	Neil Back	N/A
49	24 November	South Africa	Twickenham, London	29–9	Autumn Internationals	Martin Johnson	N/A
2002
50	2 February	Scotland	Murrayfield, Edinburgh	29–3	2002 Six Nations	Martin Johnson	N/A
51	16 February	Ireland	Twickenham, London	45–11	2002 Six Nations	Martin Johnson	N/A
52	2 March	France	Stade de France, Saint-Denis	15–20	2002 Six Nations	Martin Johnson	N/A
53	23 March	Wales	Twickenham, London	50–10	2002 Six Nations	Neil Back	N/A
54	7 April	Italy	Stadio Flaminio, Rome	45–9	2002 Six Nations	Neil Back	N/A
55	22 June	Argentina	José Amalfitani Stadium, Buenos Aires	26–18	2002 tour	Phil Vickery	N/A
56	9 November	New Zealand	Twickenham, London	31–28	Autumn Internationals	Martin Johnson	N/A
57	16 November	Australia	Twickenham, London	32–31	Autumn Internationals	Martin Johnson	N/A
58	23 November	South Africa	Twickenham, London	53–3	Autumn Internationals	Martin Johnson	N/A
2003
59	15 February	France	Twickenham, London	25–17	2003 Six Nations	Martin Johnson	N/A
60	22 February	Wales	Millennium Stadium, Cardiff	26–9	2003 Six Nations	Martin Johnson	N/A
61	9 March	Italy	Twickenham, London	40–5	2003 Six Nations	Jonny Wilkinson	N/A
62	22 March	Scotland	Twickenham, London	40–9	2003 Six Nations	Martin Johnson	N/A
63	30 March	Ireland	Lansdowne Road, Dublin	42–6	2003 Six Nations	Martin Johnson	N/A
64	14 June	New Zealand	Westpac Stadium, Wellington	15–13	2003 tour	Martin Johnson	N/A
65	21 June	Australia	Docklands Stadium, Melbourne	25–14	2003 tour	Martin Johnson	N/A
66	23 August	Wales	Millennium Stadium, Cardiff	43–9	Warm-up matches	Jason Leonard	N/A
67	30 August	France	Stade Vélodrome, Marseille	16–17	Warm-up matches	Dorian West	N/A
68	6 September	France	Twickenham, London	45–14	Warm-up matches	Martin Johnson	N/A
69	12 October	Georgia	Subiaco Oval, Perth	84–6	2003 Rugby World Cup	Martin Johnson	1st
70	18 October	South Africa	Subiaco Oval, Perth	25–6	2003 Rugby World Cup	Martin Johnson	1st
71	26 October	Samoa	Docklands Stadium, Melbourne	35–22	2003 Rugby World Cup	Martin Johnson	1st
72	2 November	Uruguay	Lang Park, Brisbane	111–13	2003 Rugby World Cup	Phil Vickery	1st
73	9 November	Wales	Lang Park, Brisbane	28–17	2003 Rugby World Cup	Martin Johnson	2nd
74	16 November	France	Stadium Australia, Sydney	24–7	2003 Rugby World Cup	Martin Johnson	1st
75	22 November	Australia	Stadium Australia, Sydney	20–17	2003 Rugby World Cup Final	Martin Johnson	1st
2004
76	15 February	Italy	Stadio Flaminio, Rome	50–9	2004 Six Nations	Lawrence Dallaglio	1st
77	21 February	Scotland	Murrayfield, Edinburgh	35–13	2004 Six Nations	Lawrence Dallaglio	1st
78	6 March	Ireland	Twickenham, London	13–19	2004 Six Nations	Lawrence Dallaglio	1st
79	20 March	Wales	Twickenham, London	31–21	2004 Six Nations	Lawrence Dallaglio	1st
80	27 March	France	Stade de France, Saint-Denis	21–24	2004 Six Nations	Lawrence Dallaglio	1st
81	12 June	New Zealand	Carisbrook, Dunedin	3–36	2004 tour	Lawrence Dallaglio	2nd
82	19 June	New Zealand	Eden Park, Auckland	12–36	2004 tour	Lawrence Dallaglio	2nd
83	26 June	Australia	Lang Park, Brisbane	15–51	2004 tour	Lawrence Dallaglio	3rd

=== Record by country ===
Opponent	Played	Won	Drew	Lost	Win ratio (%)	For	Against
Argentina	2	2	0	0	100	45	18
Australia	10	5	1	4	50	176	272
Canada	3	3	0	0	100	117	41
Fiji	1	1	0	0	100	45	24
France	10	6	0	4	60	247	161
Georgia	1	1	0	0	100	84	6
Ireland	7	5	0	2	71	226	106
Italy	7	7	0	0	100	364	80
Netherlands	1	1	0	0	100	110	0
New Zealand	9	2	1	6	22	143	298
Romania	1	1	0	0	100	134	0
Samoa	1	1	0	0	100	35	22
Scotland	7	6	0	1	86	218	88
South Africa	10	6	0	4	60	217	173
Tonga	1	1	0	0	100	101	10
United States	2	2	0	0	100	154	27
Uruguay	1	1	0	0	100	111	13
Wales	9	8	0	1	89	359	151
TOTAL	83	59	2	22	71	2886	1490

=== Honours ===
- Rugby World Cup
  - Winner: 2003
  - Quarter-finals: 1999
- Five/Six Nations Championship
  - Winner: 2000, 2001, 2003
  - Grand Slam: 2003
  - Runner-up: 1998, 1999, 2002
  - Third: 2004
- Triple Crown
  - Winner: 1998, 2002, 2003
- Calcutta Cup
  - Winner: 1998, 1999, 2001, 2002, 2003, 2004
- Millennium Trophy
  - Winner: 1998, 1999, 2000, 2002, 2003
- Cook Cup
  - Winner: November 2000, November 2001, November 2002, June 2003
- IRB International Coach of the Year
  - Winner: 2003

== Other honors ==
- Henley Hawks
  - Oxfordshire RFU County Cup
    - Winner: 1991, 1992, 1993, 1994
  - Courage South West 1
    - Winner: 1992, 1994

== See also ==
- Eddie Jones
- Bernard Laporte

Sporting positions
Preceded by Jack Rowell	English national rugby coach 1997–2004	Succeeded by Andy Robinson
Awards and achievements
Preceded by Bernard Laporte	IRB International Coach of the Year; 2003	Succeeded by Jake White
