= Lisa Zimouche =

French freestyle footballer

- Born: June 29, 1999 (age 27)
- Years active: 2013–present
- Known for: freestyle football

Lisa Zimouche (Arabic: ليزا زيموش) is a French freestyle footballer.

== Career ==
As a youth player, Zimouche join the youth academy of French side PSG. On July 27, 2013, she posted her first freestyle football video on Instagram.

She was the 2015 Female Panna World Champion. Zimouche is featured in football video game FIFA 21.

== Personal life ==
She is of Algerian descent.
