= Reformed Great Church of Sajószentpéter =

- Sajószentpéteri református nagytemplom (Hungarian)
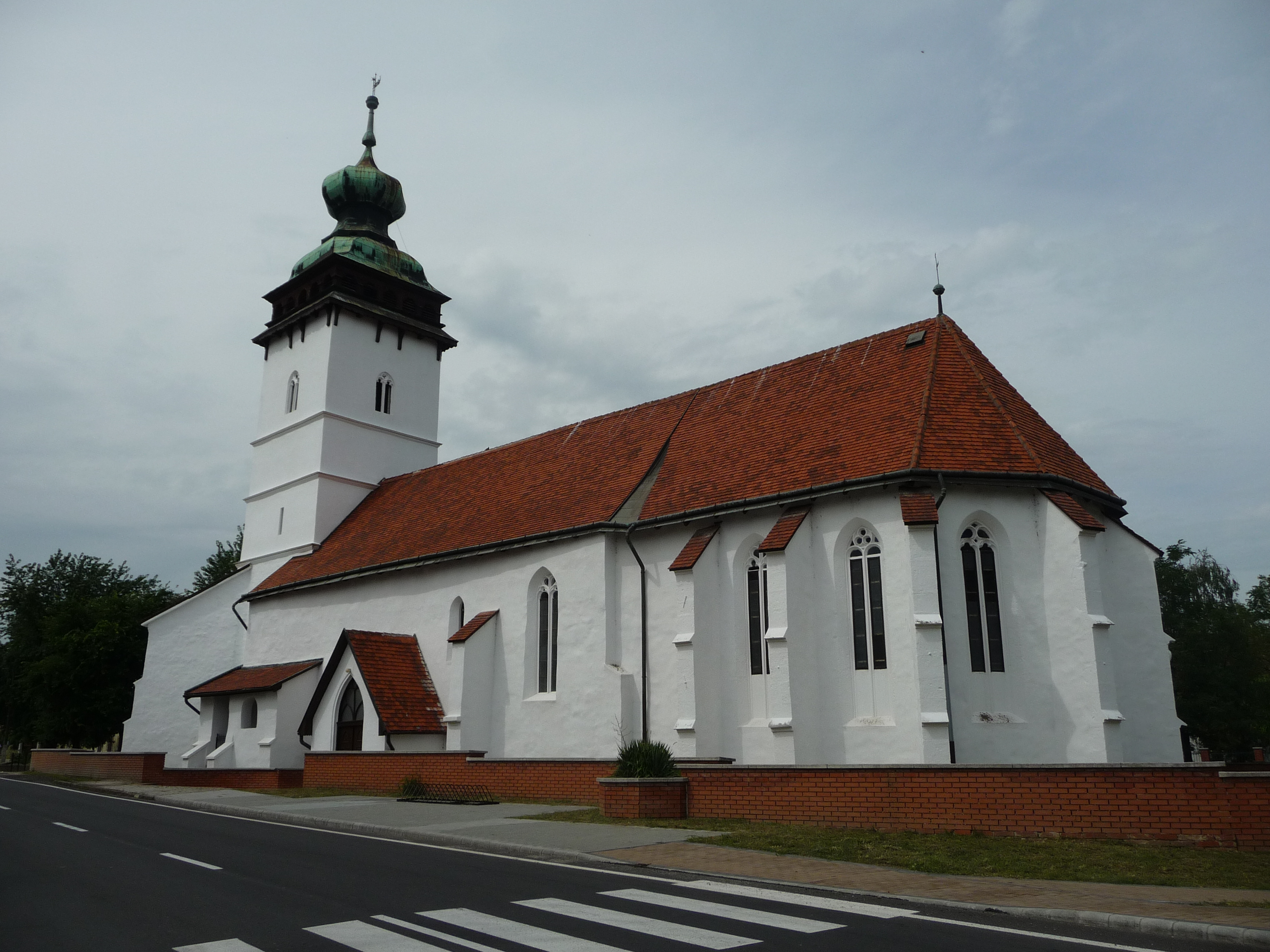

- Location within Hungary
- Country: Hungary
- Denomination: Reformed Christianity
- Previous denomination: Catholic
- Website: honlap.tirek.hu/lap/sajoszentpeter

Architecture
- Functional status: Active
- Style: Gothic, Baroque, Renaissance

Administration
- District: Cistibiscan Church District
- Parish: Congregation of the Reformed Great Church of Sajószentpéter

The Reformed Great Church of Sajószentpéter (Hungarian: Sajószentpéteri református nagytemplom) is a 14th century Protestant church in Sajószentpéter, Hungary. It was originally built in the Gothic style, but later expanded in Renaissance and Baroque styles.

== History ==
The church, located in the town center, was built by Catholics in the mid-14th century. It was dedicated to Saint Peter, after who the village is named. In the second half of the 15th century, it was expanded with a tower, and around 1510, with a sacristy.

The building has been used by the Reformed congregation since 1555. They painted over the church’s frescoes and demolished its altars. Between 1560 and 1561, the famous Hungarian preacher Pál Farkas Thúri, a close friend of John Calvin, served here.

The church's original Gothic vault collapsed in the fire of 1752, the interior furnishings were completely destroyed and even the bells melted. That was also when the unique Baroque spire was built. Most of the furnishings were made after the fire. The pulpit, as well as the gallery and the pews, are decorated in folk Baroque style; the coffered ceiling is in medallion style.

== Organ ==
The organ, which is in near-original condition, was built in 1893 in Székesfehérvár by Gyula Szalay, following a donation from Presbyter Ferenc Kasza and his wife, Julianna Egri. The ceremonial organ consecration took place later that year, on October 22.

== Bells ==
The church tower once housed three bells; today, only two remain. The larger one weighs 600 kg and was cast in 1974 in the workshop of Lajos Gombos, a master bell founder from Őrbottyán. The smaller bell weighs 200 kg and was made by Harangművek Rt. in Budapest in 1923.

== Gallery ==
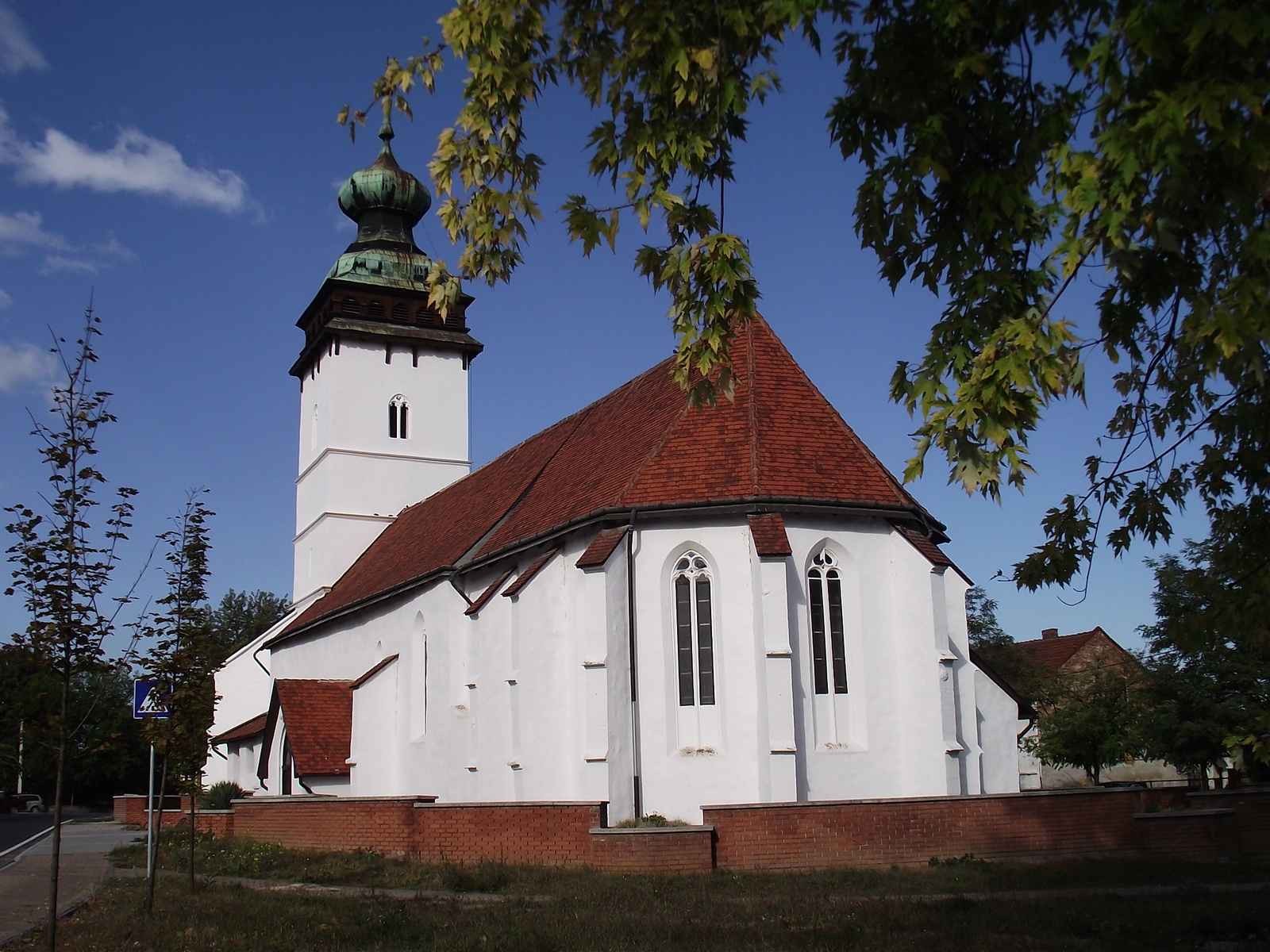
Back of the church

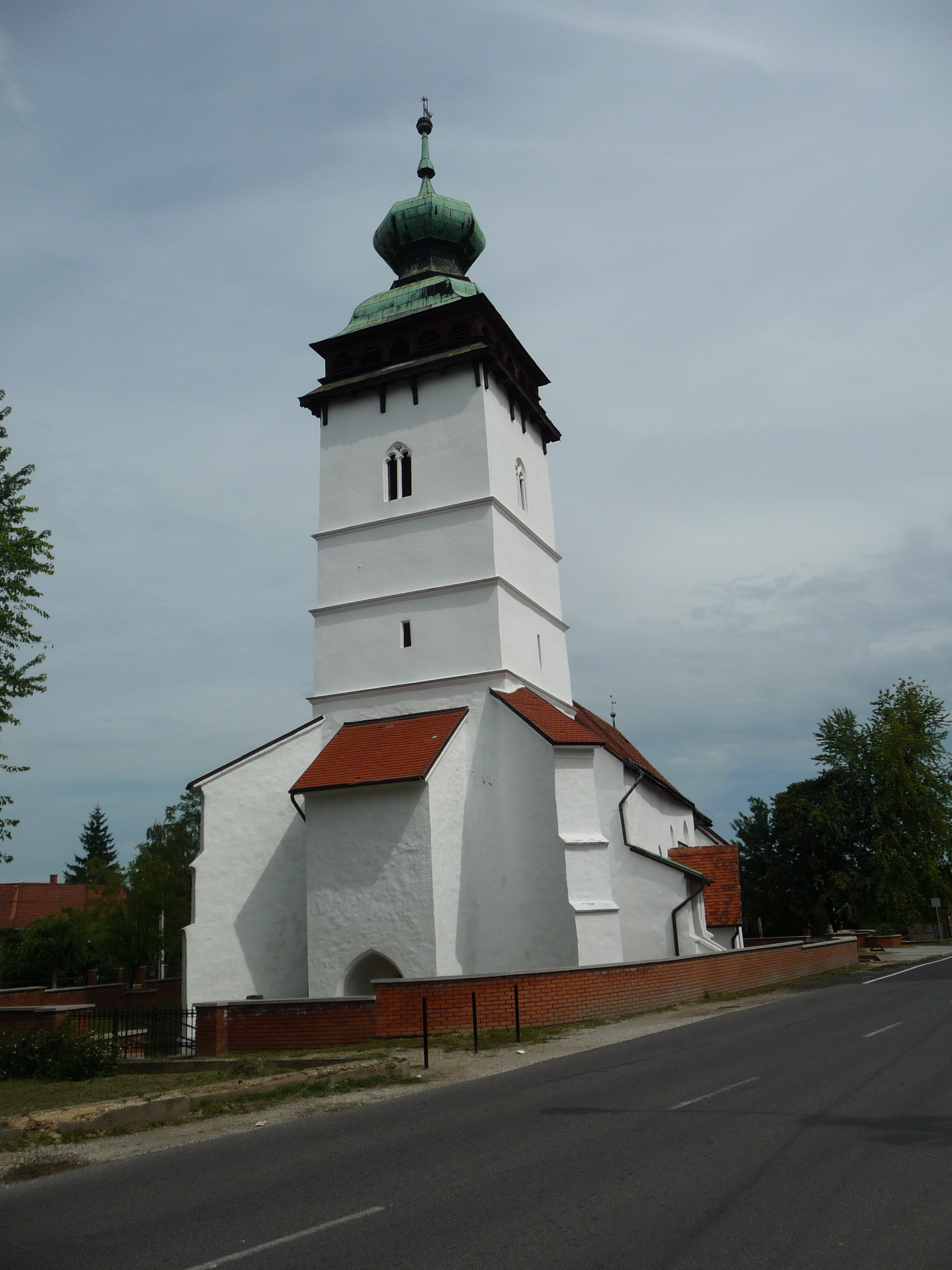
Tower

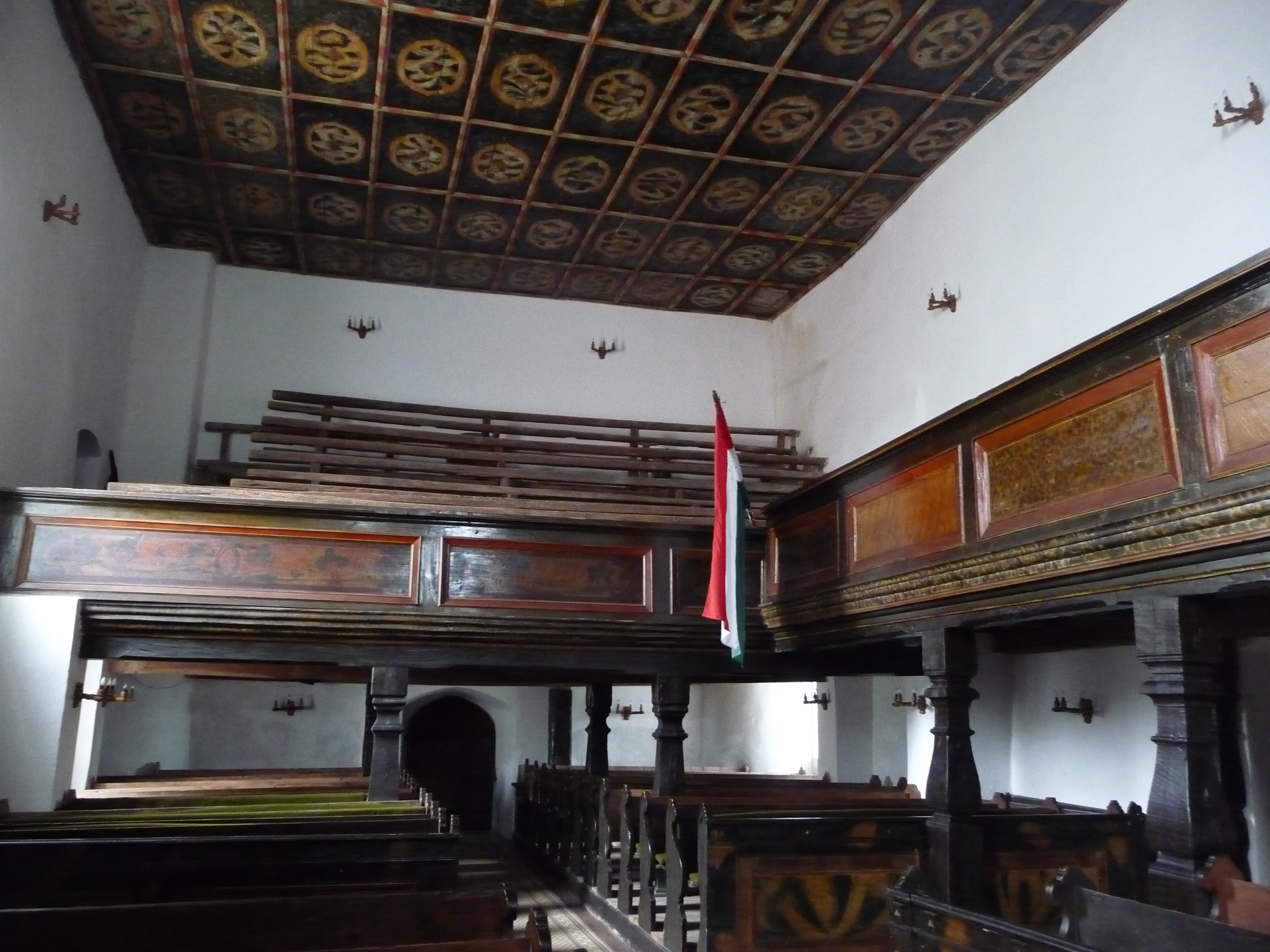
Gallery

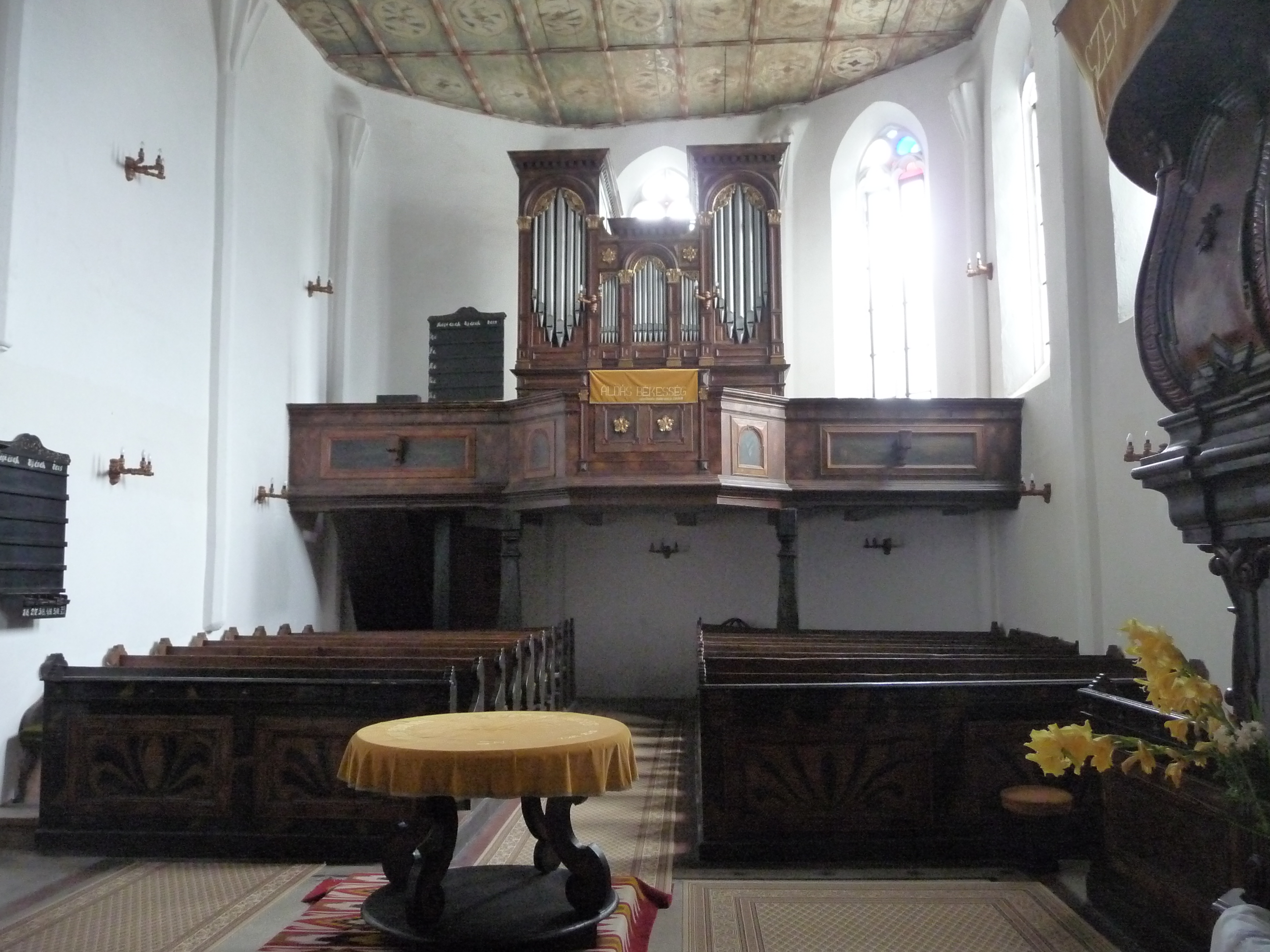
Organ

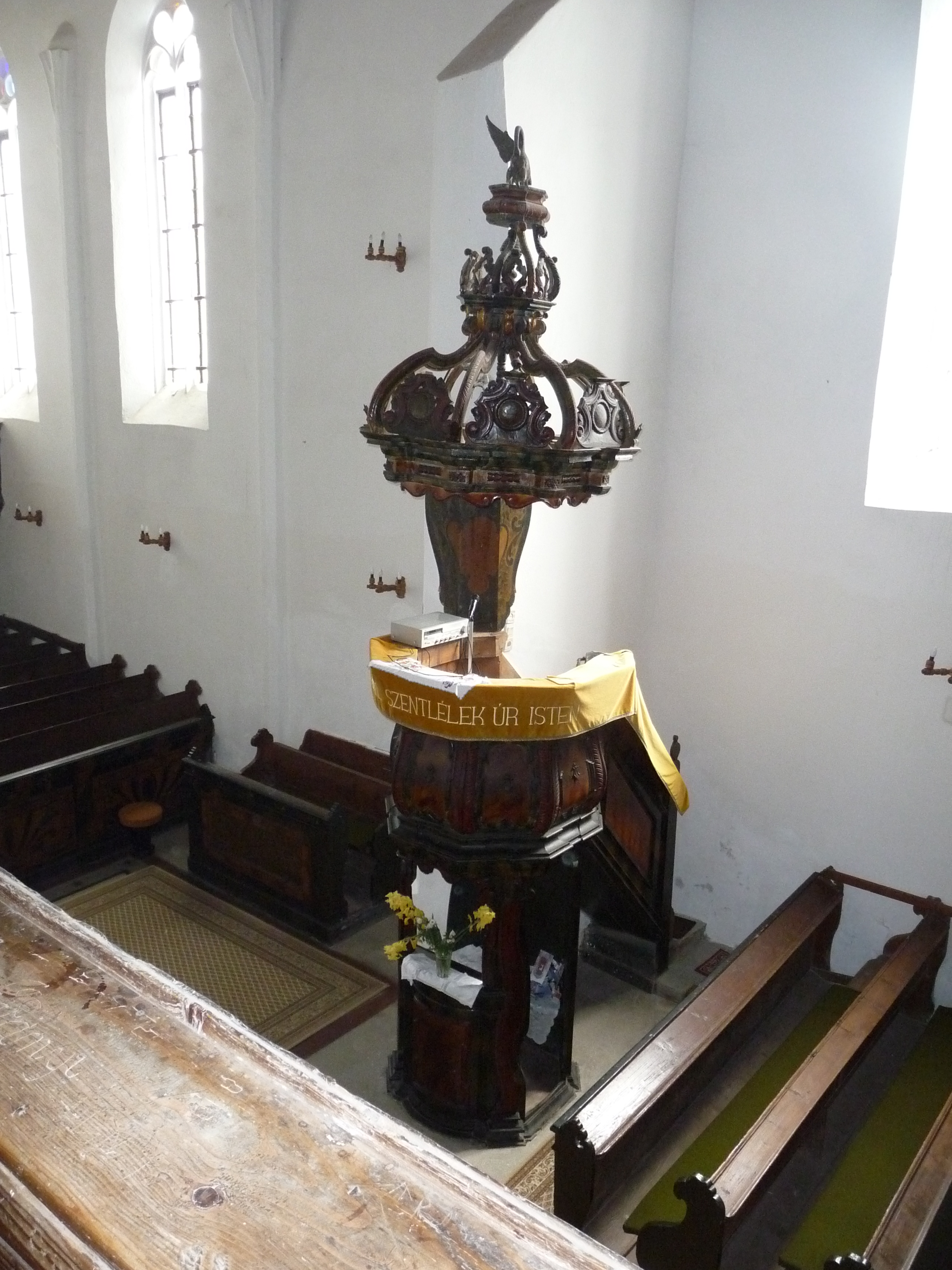
Pulpit

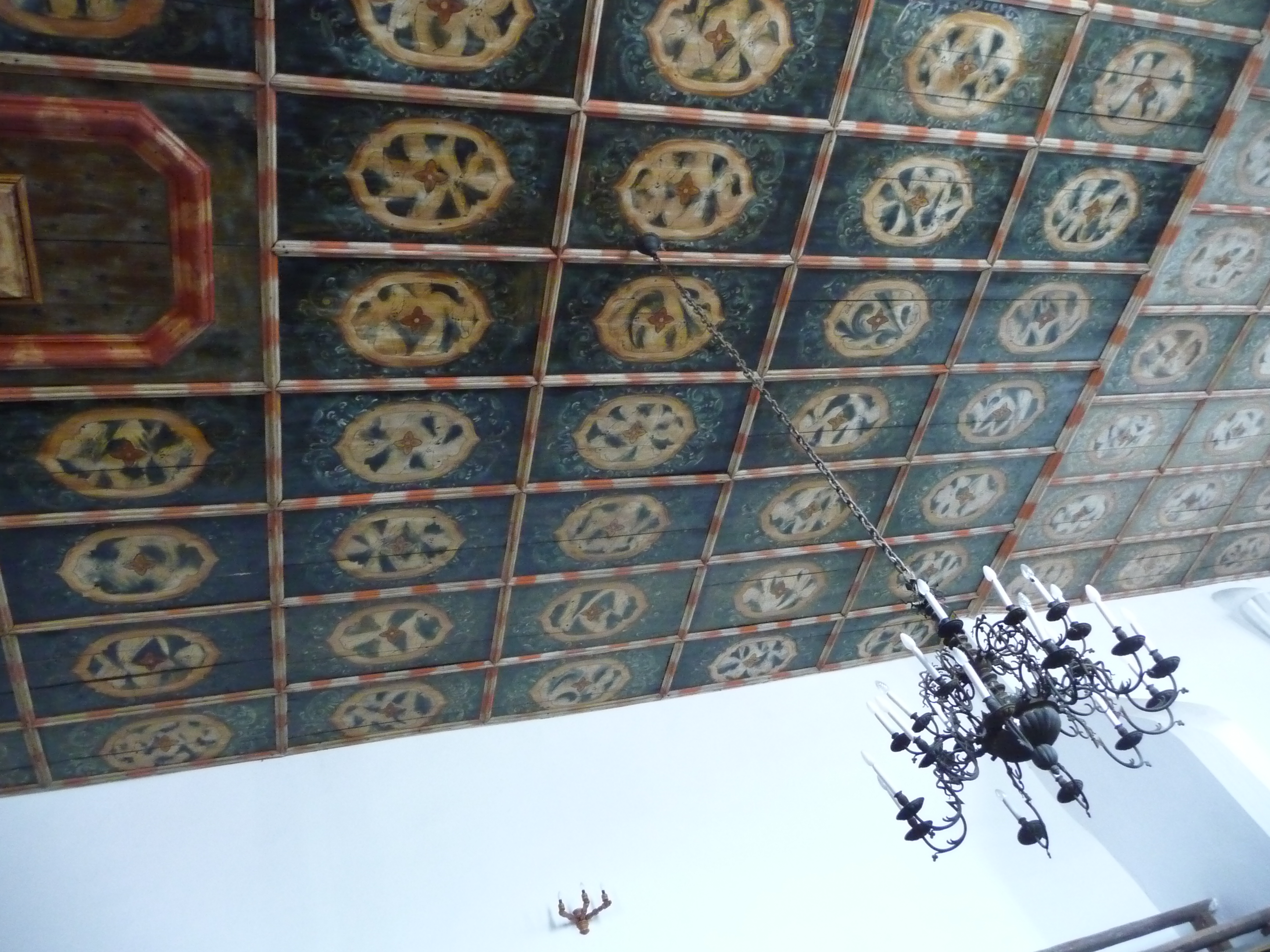
Coffered ceiling

== See also ==
- Reformed Church in Hungary
- Sajószenpéter
