= L'Huillier-Coburg Palace =

Coordinates: 48.2936°N 20.7392°E

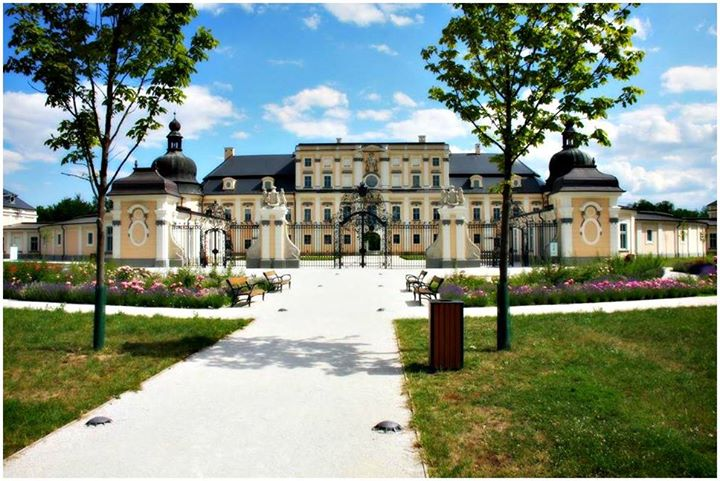
L'Huillier-Coburg Palace in Edelény

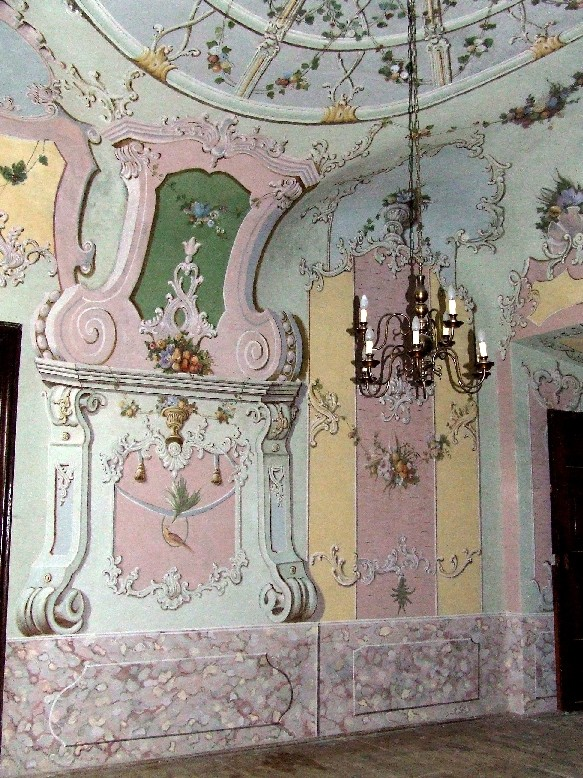
Interior of the palace

L'Huillier-Coburg Palace in Edelény is the seventh largest palace in Hungary. This prominent example of early Baroque architecture was built between 1716 and 1730 by Jean-Francois L'Huillier, who originated from Alsace-Lorraine, France. In 1727, L'Huillier became the full owner of the palace with the king's consent.

== History ==
The construction of the palace needed well-organized logistics, as the timber was brought from more than 20 km away. Stones were from the local quarry and were used for the walls and the foundations. There were also limestone and sand hereabout. Sometimes eighteen bricklayers worked with their servants at the same time. Works that did not need skills were done by day-labourers and serfs.

After L'Huillier died, his wife Marie-Madeleine de Saint-Croix had finished the construction by 1730. The researchers have not been able to ascertain yet who was the designer of this unique palace.

The most significant changes on the palace, which still exist, were made by the granddaughter of Jean-Francois L'Huillier, Ludmilla, and her second husband István Eszterházy. The couple commissioned Ferenc Lieb with the painting of six rooms. The largest rococo frescoes in Hungary were completed in 1770.

After Ludmilla's death, the palace was inherited by his son Ferenc Dessewffy, who did not place any changes on the palace. As he had no heir, the palace became the property of the Royal Chamber in 1820.

The next owner of the palace was Prince Ferdinand of Saxe-Coburg and Gotha, lieutenant-general in the Austro-Hungarian armed forces, who bought the complex and made an entail from it. The Coburgs acquired the palace because of economic reasons which resulted in the recovery of the area. Before 1845, one of the first sugar factories was established in Edelény, and they also maintained high-level agricultural activities on their lands.

However, as the palace had not been used for baronial residency since 1820, the building started to decay. Renovation became necessary, which was performed by the plans of Rezső Vilmos Ray between 1910 and 1913. In the course of the recovery, several parts of the building were reconstructed, neo-baroque supplements were put onto the palace, and a mansard roof was also built in the middle of the building.

In 1912, the Coburg family rented some parts of the building to the Bódvavalley Mining Company, then the palace finally came into the possession of the state, since the Ministry of Justice bought it in 1928.

After 1928, further reconstructions were accomplished. Downstairs, a prison was created and lodgings for the jailers. The district court was also located in the palace, as well as the gendarme barracks, the flat of the Member of Parliament in Edelény, and other lodgings.

World War II brought a new situation in the life of the palace, as in 1945, the Soviets moved into the building. Since that time, the ruination of the palace started, as the building was not used properly. For instance, a room decorated with substantial frescos was used as a henhouse. By the middle of the 1980s, the decline of the palace speeded up. The regular and serious flooding damaged or totally destroyed most of the frescos.

The maintenance of the palace was taken over by The National Trust of Monuments for Hungary in 2001, and this date marks the beginning of the recovery of the palace. The development plan is being fulfilled in two phases. According to the plans, the external appearance of the palace and most of its inner places have been renovated.

== Sources ==
- Edelényi Kastélysziget (in Hungarian)
- Kastélyutak (in Hungarian)
