= Oszkár Molnár =

Hungarian politician (born 1956)

Member of the National Assembly
- In office 18 June 1998 – 5 May 2014

Personal details
- Born: 1 June 1956 (age 70) Sajószentpéter, People's Republic of Hungary
- Party: Independent (2010–present)
- Other political affiliations: SZDSZ (1988–1993); Fidesz (1993–2010)
- Children: Oszkár; Alexandra
- Profession: politician

Oszkár Molnár (born 1 June 1956) is a Hungarian politician and has been member of the National Assembly (MP) between 1998 and 2014.

== Biography ==
He was born in Sajószentpéter, Borsod-Abaúj-Zemplén County, on 1 June 1956. He finished Izsó Miklós Secondary School of Edelény in 1974. He is married, with two children. His wife is a managing director.

=== Business career ===
He worked as a driver for Borsod Volán in Miskolc from 1980 to 1991. He has been the managing director of Eurolux-Trans Ltd. since 1991, which is, based on its 1996 results, among the 200 most successful businesses in Hungary. He has been a member of the Borsod-Abaúj-Zemplén County branch of the Chamber of Commerce and Industry since 1994, where he has been vice chairman of the transport department since 1996. He was the chairman of the Edelény City Sport Club from 1996 to 1999.

=== Political career ===
He joined the Alliance of Free Democrats (SZDSZ) in 1988, he became the executive of the Edelény branch. He left the party in 1993 and joined the FIDESZ - Hungarian Civic Party (FIDESZ-MPP). He had been the head of the Edelény branch of FIDESZ since 1993, he had been the Borsod-Abaúj-Zemplén County vice president of the party since 1999. In the local elections of September–October 1990 he was elected individual local representative in Edelény. He ran in the 1994 parliamentary elections. In the national elections of spring 1998 he was elected individual MP representing Edelény, Constituency 8, Borsod-Abaúj-Zemplén County. In the local elections of October 1998 was elected local representative from the list, but he failed to win the office of mayor.

In the April 2002 parliamentary elections he was elected incumbent individual MP for Edelény. He had participated in the work of the Economic Committee since May 2002. In the local elections of 20 October 2002 he was elected mayor of Edelény, an individual local representative, and he also made it to the County Assembly. He was elected MP in the 2006 elections from the Borsod-Abaúj-Zemplén county regional list. He was a member of the Committee on Employment and Labour.

In 2009 he said that: "I love Hungary, I love Hungarians, and I prefer Hungarian interests to global financial capital, or Jewish capital, if you like, which wants to devour the whole world, but especially Hungary." He later said that, it was only a response to a Shimon Peres speech in which Peres said that his country aimed to "colonise" Hungary when he spoke of Israel's investments abroad, Peres said that Israel was "buying out Manhattan, Poland, Hungary."

Molnár also claimed that the language of instruction in Jerusalem schools was Hungarian and they were "learning the language of their future homeland." His party did not denounce his statement but simply said it was "embarrassing." Adding that he would not even consider ousting Molnár from his party or parliamentary faction, as the remark "did not violate the party's bylaws." However, in 2010 he was excluded from the Fidesz, due to these remarks. Instead of him, a Lebanese-origin doctor, Pierre Daher became the Fidesz candidate. Molnár later also claimed that pregnant Roma women deliberately try to induce birth defects so they can give birth to "fools to receive higher family subsidies. I have checked this and it’s true; they hit their bellies with a rubber hammer so that they’ll give birth to handicapped kids." In 2011, he denounced roma women at the Hungarian police authorities.

During 2010 national elections he decided that measured by itself at Edelény constituency. As a result of the withdrawal of the Jobbik candidate Árpád Miklós before the second round Molnár was able to defeat his opponent, Pierre Daher and became a member of the National Assembly as an independent lawmaker. He was elected to a member of the Committee on Audit Office and Budget after the 6th parliamentary session hold the inaugural session on 14 May 2010. Molnár did not run in the 2014 parliamentary election. He was re-elected as mayor of Edelény in 2014 and 2019 too, now with the support of his former party Fidesz.

== Personal life ==
He is married and has a daughter, Alexandra and a son, Oszkár.
