= Edelény =

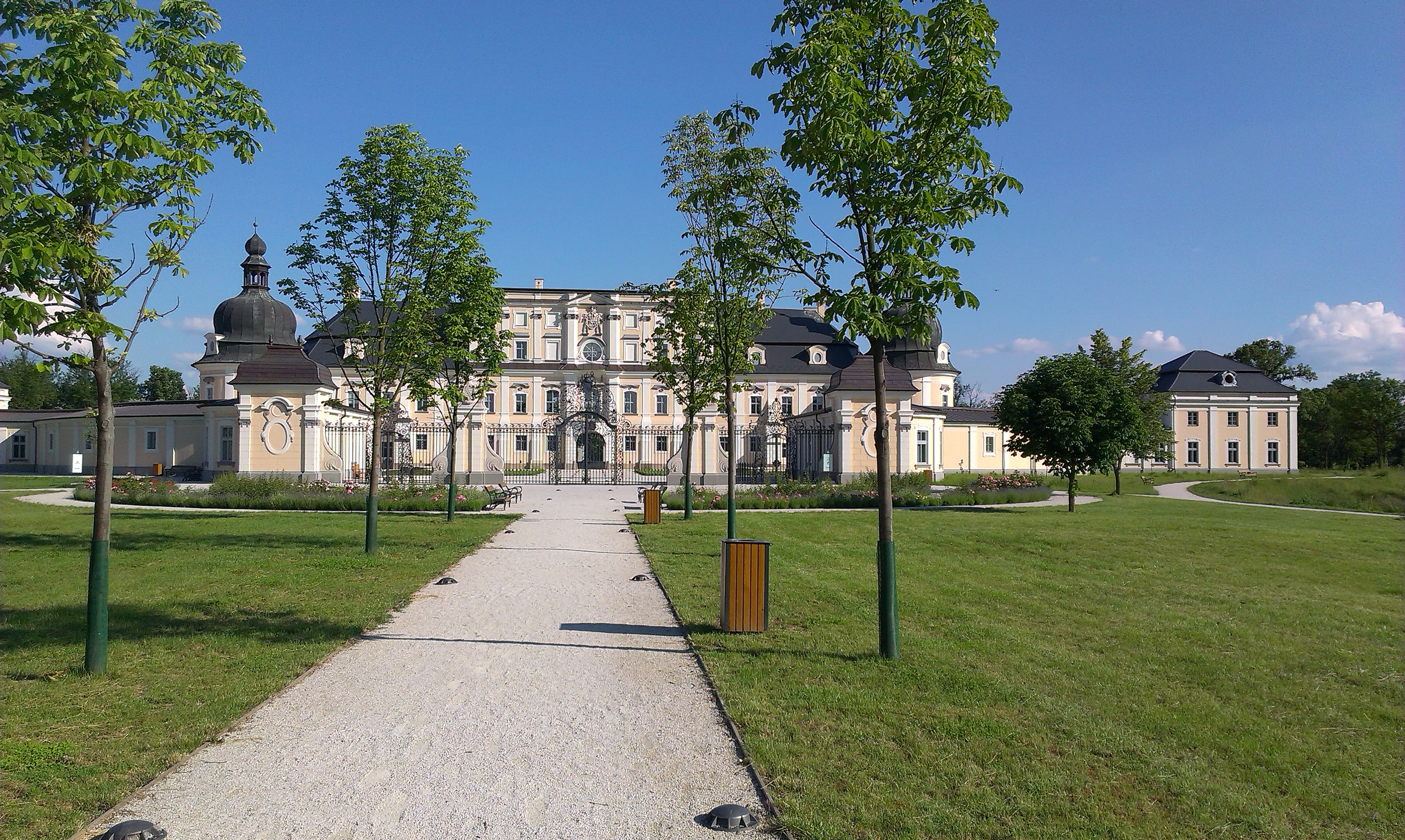
- L'Huillier-Coburg Palace

- Flag Coat of arms

- Location of Edelény in Hungary
- Coordinates: 48.2967°N 20.7442°E
- Country: Hungary
- Region: Northern Hungary
- County: Borsod-Abaúj-Zemplén

Government
  - Mayor: Oszkár Molnár (Independent)

Area
  - Total: 56.84 km^{2} (21.95 sq mi)

Population (2012)
  - Total: 10,019
  - Density: 176.3/km^{2} (456.5/sq mi)
- Time zone: UTC+1 (CET)
  - Summer (DST): UTC+2 (CEST)
- Postal code: 3780
- Area code: +36 48
- Website: http://www.edeleny.hu

Edelény is a town in Borsod-Abaúj-Zemplén county, Northern Hungary. It lies in the valley of Bódva River, 25 km (16 mi) north of the county seat, Miskolc. The historic L'Huillier-Coburg Palace is located there.

== History ==
The area has been inhabited since ancient times (Paleolithic stone tools were found here). Edelény was first mentioned in 1299, but the village of Borsod, which was annexed to the town in the 20th century, was already mentioned in 1108 (Borsod comitatus belonged to the castle of Borsod in the Middle Ages).

The residents of Edelény worked in agriculture in mediaeval times. During the Turkish occupation of Hungary, the town was deserted several times.

In the 19th century, industry became more important in the area. In 1838, a sugar factory was built, and a brown coal mine was opened. The Jewish population (1910: 8.3%; 1941: 7.9%) was deported and murdered in early June 1944.

Two nearby villages were annexed to Edelény: Borsod in 1950, and Finke in 1963. Edelény got town status in 1986.

== Twin towns – sister cities ==
Edelény is twinned with:

- Bad Sobernheim, Germany
- Moldava nad Bodvou, Slovakia
- Siewierz, Poland
- Worb, Switzerland
