= Woo Hee-young =

South Korean footballer (born 1963)

Personal information
- Born: 13 November 1963 (age 62) Seoul, South Korea
- Height: 5 ft 8 in (1.73 m)

Sport
- Sport: Freestyle football

Woo Hee-young (born 13 November 1963), also known as Mr. Woo, is a South Korean former freestyle footballer.

== Career ==
Born in Seoul, South Korea, at a very early age, Woo realized he had football talent. Inspired by Diego Maradona and his unique ball control ability, Woo practiced and practiced to emulate the skill. Woo won a national football skills competition in Korea and decided he wanted to become a footballer. Woo later trained with Stuttgart Kickers in Germany. Still practising his ball skills, Woo realized he wanted to become famous worldwide as the "Greatest Football Entertainer in the World".

Woo broke the Guinness Book of World Records for football head tricks in 1989 by heading a ball for 5 hours, 6 minutes and 30 seconds.

Whilst in Germany, Woo performed at the DFB-Pokal final and then back in Korea, Woo did his skills routine at the opening ceremony of the Seoul 1988 Summer Olympics. During the 1990 FIFA World Cup, Woo performed for Pelé at this 50th birthday celebration event. Woo then moved to Hawaii in the United States and began coaching as well performing at various events in Las Vegas. He performed again for fans in 1994 FIFA World Cup and on numerous occasions performed in front of big audiences for the Outrigger Hotels group in Hawaii.

Woo again became involved in the 2002 FIFA World Cup when the tournament was held in his native South Korea. As an ambassador for the World Cup 2002 in Korea, Woo promoted the event at many games.

Woo then decided to perform his skills in the United Kingdom, the 'home of football', and has performed on television, for Nike in recent freestyle commercials and events across the UK, at football matches, corporate events, coaching and even impromptu public appearances whilst he practices his skills. During the film shoot for the Nike Stickman TV commercial, Brazilian World Cup winner Ronaldinho was so impressed he even asked Woo to sign his football.

== See also ==
- Freestyle football
- World Freestyle Football Association
