= Ricardinho (freestyle football) =

Brazilian freestyle footballer

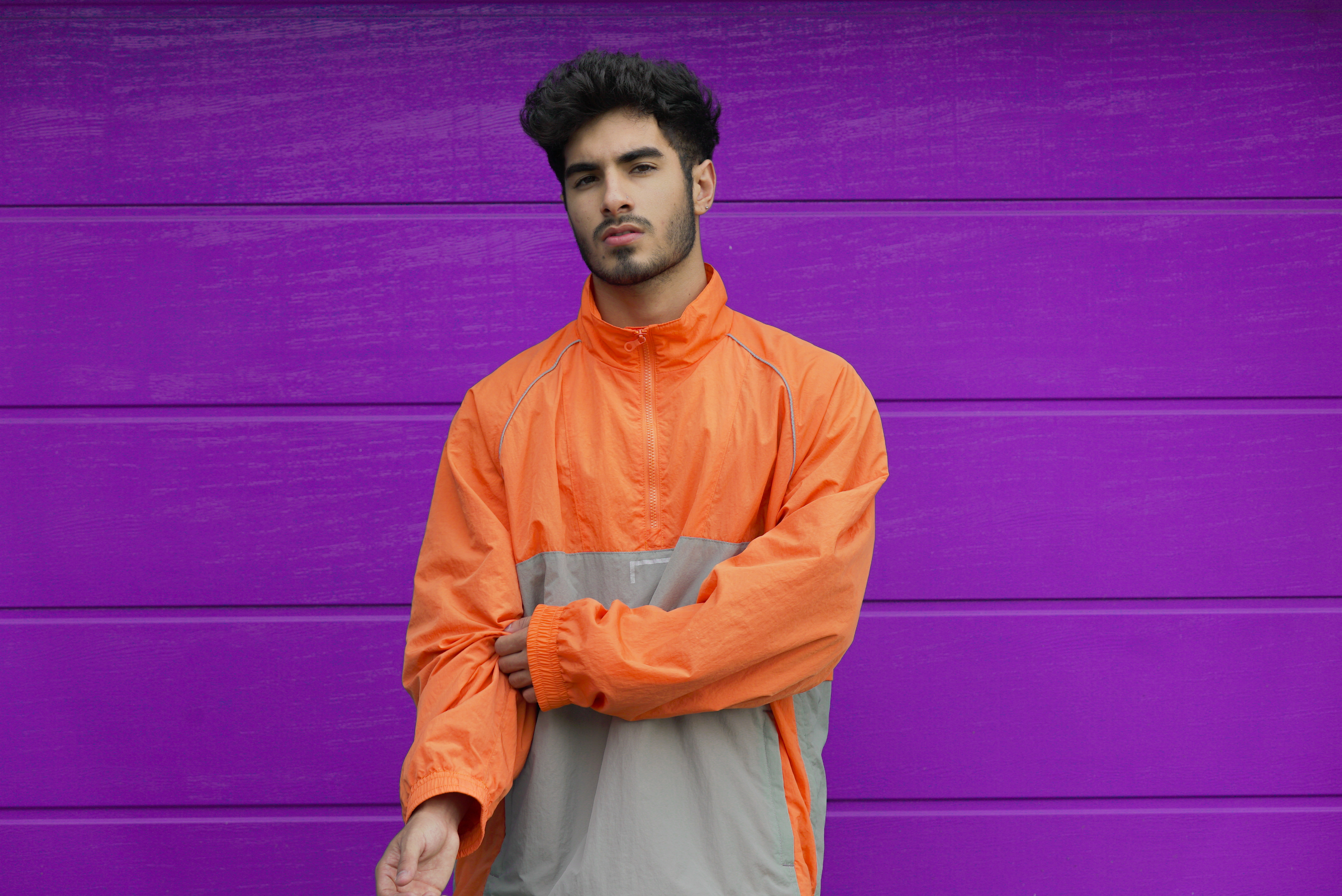
- Ricardinho

Personal information
- Full name: Ricardo Fabiano Chahini de Araujo
- Born: 16 February 1998 (age 28) Belém, Brazil
- Height: 1.67 m (5 ft 5 1/2 in)

Sport
- Country: Brazil
- Sport: Freestyle Football
- Position: 1st

Achievements and titles
- Highest world ranking: 1 (1 November 2019)
- Updated on 5 December 2019

Ricardo Fabiano Chahini de Araujo (born 16 February 1998), also known as Ricardinho, is a Brazilian freestyle footballer from Belém do Pará, who was the 2019 Red Bull Street Freestyle world champion.

== Career ==
Ricardinho started freestyle football in 2009 when he was 10 years old.

He was a candidate to win one of the ten spots in the "Pipoca" group of the twenty-sixth season of Big Brother Brasil in 2026, but was surpassed by Brígido Neto in the popular vote.

== Honours ==
- World Champion Red Bulls street style 2019
- Red Bull Street Style World Finalist 2019
- Brazilian Champion Red bull:3` 2014, 2017, 2019
- Vice World Champion World Masters 2018
- Brazilian Champion Redbull 2018
- Runner-up Redbull 2018
- National Champion at Arnold 2018
- Latin American Champion:2` 2016, 2017
- SuperBall World Open 3rd place 2015
- South American Champion 2016, 2017
- SuperBall World Open Champion 2017.
- 3rd Place in the Superball World Championship (2015)
- Brazilian runner up 2014
- South American runner up 2014
- Latin American Vice Champion (2014)
- Brazilian Champion street cup (2014)
- Brazilian runner-up (2013)
