= Freestyle football =

Football juggling and tricks

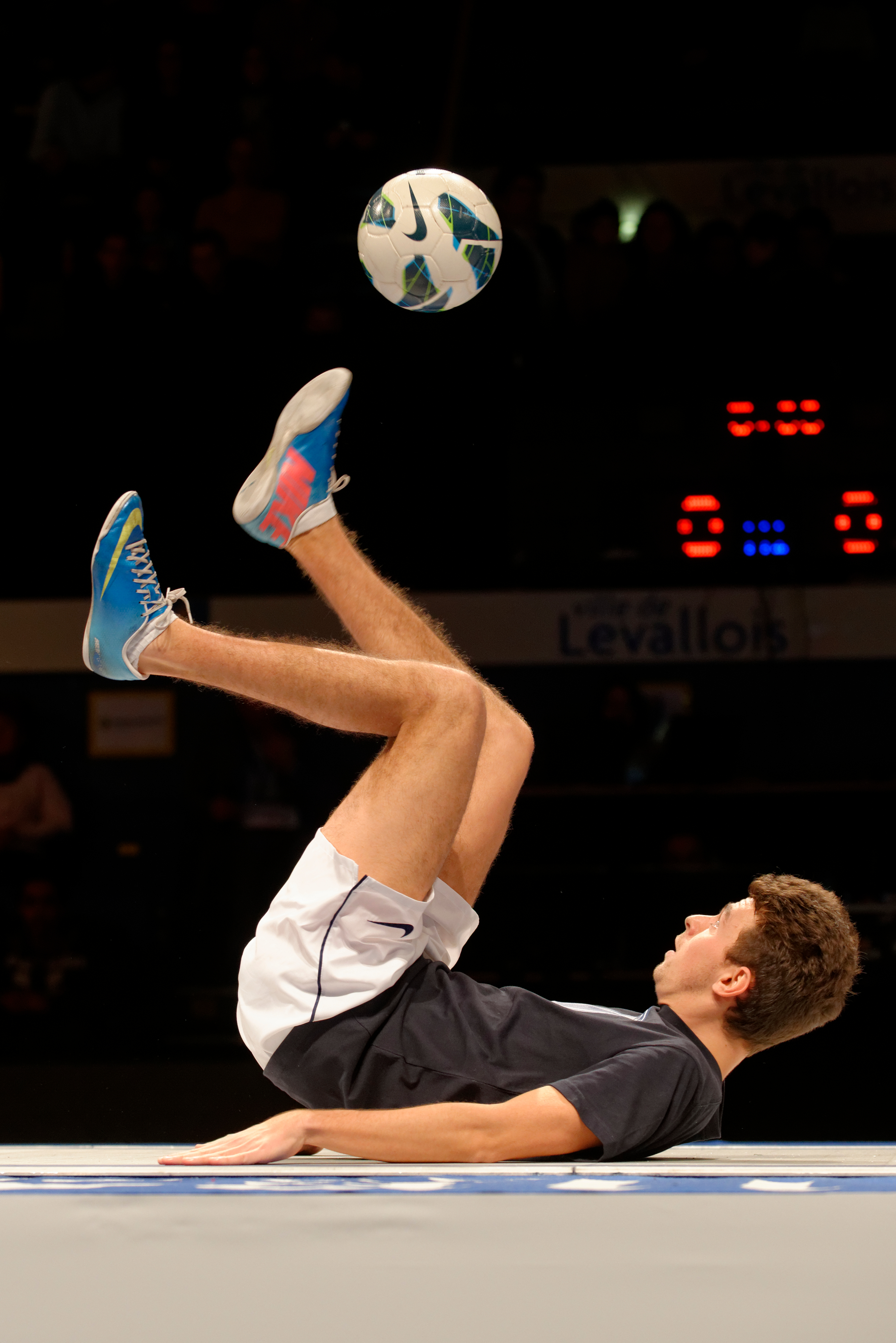
- Football freestyle demonstration at the 2013 Masters à l'Epée
- Highest governing body: World Freestyle Football Association

Characteristics
- Contact: No
- Type: Ball sport
- Equipment: Football

Presence
- Olympic: No

Freestyle football (football juggling and tricks) is the art of juggling a football using any part of the body, excluding the elbows to the hands. It combines football tricks, dance, acrobatics and music to entertain onlookers and compete with opponents. The official governing body for this sport is known as the World Freestyle Football Association (WFFA).

== History ==
The art of freestyle football can be traced to games of Southeast Asia such as chinlone, jianzi and sepak takraw, which have been practised for 2,000 years. Fundamental freestyle tricks such as the 'Neck Stall' and 'Around The World' were first popularly performed in the West by circus performers, notably including Enrico Rastelli and Francis Brunn.

In the 1970s and 1980s, Argentine footballer Diego Maradona famously brought his freestyle 'Life is Life' warm-up to international attention while playing for SSC Napoli. The ability to freestyle, however, was widely criticized at the time as not having direct relevance to playing the game of football.

At the beginning of the 21st century, several significant events helped elevate freestyle football with broader recognition. Brazilian footballer Ronaldinho starred in Nike advertising campaigns such as "Joga Bonito" (English: Play Beautifully), which popularized the ability to practice alone with a ball and develop new moves and tricks.

Inspired by Maradona, South Korean footballer Mr Woo sought to become a football entertainer. He established Guinness world records and performed at the 1988 Summer Olympics opening ceremony, and the FIFA World Cups in 1990 and 1994. Soufiane Touzani from the Netherlands introduced a new style of lower tricks, which were popularized through viral videos.

Footballer Sandy Levittas (a.k.a. Bambiball) was among the first women to share videos of her freestyle skills, which inspired more girls to take up the sport. Different styles were then developed such as lowers, uppers, sit-downs, grounds and blocking.

In 2015, Ronaldinho was recognized by the World Freestyle Football Association (WFFA) as ambassador for the sport. Competitions have been organized across the globe and videos have been shared by over 80 million of people on a monthly basis.

In recent years, some of the top football players in the world have credited freestyle and street football cultures for helping to develop their talents. These athletes have included Neymar Jr, Cristiano Ronaldo, Lionel Messi and Zlatan Ibrahimović.

== Tricks ==
Tricks or moves in freestyle football are categorized into different disciplines or styles:

- Lower body or air move tricks are performed while standing, and use the feet or legs. (lowers)
- Upper body tricks are performed with the head, chest and shoulders. (uppers)
- Sitting tricks are performed while seated, often with the legs elevated. (sit-downs)
- Ground move tricks are performed while standing with the ball on the floor. Skillful players can make the performance of ground moves seem like a choreographed dance.
- Blocking tricks are performed by holding the ball with various parts of the lower body. It is a style inspired by breakdancing.
- Acrobatic tricks are inspired by circus skills, breakdancing and gymnastics.
- Transitions are intermediate moves used to bridge tricks in different styles, ideally in a fluid motion.

Within the above disciplines, the following individual moves are among the most popular:

- Around the World (ATW), a move in which the freestyler plays the ball off of one foot, which then circles up and over the ball before returning underneath to play the ball again. An inside ATW makes the initial movement toward the opposite leg, while an outside ATW makes the initial movement away from the opposite leg.
- Crossover, a move in which the ball is kicked into the air with one leg, and the opposite leg goes around the ball while it is in the air.
- Toe Bounce (TB) a move like a crossover but with the ball bouncing on the foot.
- Hop the World (HTW), a move in which the ball is kicked up with one foot and circled with the opposite foot.
  - Touzani around the World (TATW), a variation of an outside ATW and a crossover. Created by Soufiane Touzani from the Netherlands.
  - Mitchy around the World (MATW), as with the TATW except with an inside ATW. Created by Mitchell James Penn from the UK.
  - Lemmens Around the World (LATW), a double ATW, circling the foot twice around the airborne ball without a middle touch between revolutions.
  - Palle Around the World (PATW), a triple ATW. Created by Rickard "Palle" Sjolander of Sweden.
- Stalls, moves which involve catching the ball in a stationary position. This is commonly on the back of the neck but also includes balancing on the forehead or wedged between the heel and thigh.
- Clipper, a move that originated from freestyle footbag in which the freestyler catches the ball midair with the inside of the foot on the side of the body.
- Combos, moves which directly connect tricks without juggling the ball.
- No-touch combos, tricks performed in one motion without any intermediate ball touch. For example, the LATW is a two ATW no-touch combo.

== Competitive freestyle ==
The first major competition for freestyle football was Red Bull Street Style (RBSS) in 2008, which was hosted in São Paulo, Brazil. Séan Garnier won this competition with a style that had not been seen in the public eye before.

Super Ball, the first open world championship (where anyone could compete) catered to freestylers with ranging styles, recognizing the many ways to judge a freestyler. Hosted in the Czech Republic, Super Ball became the premiere annual international event for freestylers.

=== Tournaments ===
The following tournaments are recognized by the official governing body of the World Freestyle Football Association:

- Red Bull Street Style (RBSS) World Finals
- World Freestyle Masters
- Super Ball World Open Championships
- Panther Ball World Open Championships
- European Freestyle Football Championships (EFFC)
- Asia-Pacific Freestyle Football Championships (APFFC)
- African Freestyle Football Championships (AFFC)
- Latin American Freestyle Football Championships (LAFFC)
- North American Freestyle Football Championships (NAFFC)
- National Championships (all countries)

=== Events ===
Typical events in competitive freestyle football include:

- Battles
- Doubles (team battles)
- Routines
- Doubles routines
- Sick 3
- Challenge
- Iron man
- Show flow
- Kill the beat
- Max 1
- 3vs3

=== Ranked freestylers ===
The WFFA uses results from the official national championships, continental championships, international opens and world open competitions to assign a point ranking to competitors.

- Ricardo Chahini (Brazil)
- Andrew Henderson (UK)
- Melody Donchet (France)
- Lisa Zimouche (France)
- Michal "Michryc" Rycaj (Poland)
- Kitti Szász, (Hungary) freestyle football four times world champion
- Erlend Fagerli (Norway)
- Muhammad Riswan - (India)
- Aguska Mnich (Poland)
- Lia Lewis

== WFFA Committee ==
Other key names that brought their own touch to the art of freestyle football over the years include:

- Aarish Ansari (India)
- Nam the Man (Ireland/Vietnam)
- Palle (Sweden)
- Steve Elias (Canada)
- Daniel Rooseboom de Vries (The Netherlands)
- John Farnworth (UK)
- Jeon Kwon (South Korea)
- Iya Traore (France)
- Abbas Farid (UK)
- Yosuke Yokota (Japan)
- Ash Randall (UK)

== Media ==
In January 2019, freestyle football has received over 80 million video views per month on social media channels. There are over 70 related events every year, the largest being the Red Bull Street Style World Final. The sport is enjoyed mainly by a demographic of 12–25 year-olds, with 85% male.

Major markets in terms of consumption of freestyle football content include the United States, Mexico, Brazil, UK, Spain, Poland, France, the Middle East, China, Japan and South East Asia, with a direct audience of 1.47 billion football fans around the globe.
