= World Freestyle Football Association =

Governing body of freestyle football

WFFA
- World Freestyle Football Association
- World Freestyle Football Association logo
- Abbreviation: WFFA
- Founded: 1 January 2017; 9 years ago
- Founded at: Ontario, Canada
- Type: Federation of national associations
- Legal status: Not-for-profit
- Purpose: Sport governance
- Headquarters: Barcelona, Spain
- Region served: Worldwide
- Members: 119 Member countries
- Official languages: English, Spanish
- President: Lukáš 'Lucaso' Škoda
- Head of the Global Network: Pekko 'PeGe' Piirto
- Head of Partnerships: Laura Biondo
- Athletes' Representative: Soufiane Msalek
- Website: www.worldfreestylefootball.org

The World Freestyle Football Association (WFFA) is the international governing body for the sport of Freestyle Football. Originally founded in Ontario, Canada in 2017, the WFFA operates as a non-profit organisation and is headquartered in Barcelona, Catalonia, Spain.

The WFFA was born as the natural evolution of a global governing body for freestyle football, taking over from the old Freestyle Football Federation (F3), which had been founded in 2011.

Freestyle Football is defined as an art and sport, which involves participants creatively juggling a ball using all parts of the body to entertain audiences and outperform opponents; it combines street culture of football tricks, dance, acrobatics and music.

== Attributions ==
The WFFA develops and manages the Official World Rankings System, the World Freestyle Day (held annually on 1 September), all rules and regulations of official WFFA competitions, and the key WFFA events across the calendar, including the World Freestyle Football Championship, its continental qualifiers the Pulse Series, the Super Ball World Open and the NextGen World Championship.

The WFFA Sports Committee, consisting of elite freestylers from all around the world, decides on the evolution of the Rules and Regulations for the sport, updating them on a regular basis. The last official update of the Rules of Freestyle Football was announced in 2024.

== Internal organisation ==
The Global Network of the WFFA operates throughout 119 countries (as of January 2026) with the mission of growing awareness and participation in the sport of freestyle football for both male and females of all ages and backgrounds. The ambition for the sport to be used as a tool for positive social change in communities worldwide.

The WFFA Global Network features one Country Leader in each of the member nations, which in turn are arranged into 15 regional clusters, each of them managed by a key Leader. These key Leaders then report to the board of the WFFA.

The structure and worldwide official network for the sport has been in constant development since the establishment of the IF3 in 2011.

== Events ==
The official circuit of the WFFA includes tournaments of regional and global events in which all participants score points for the World Rankings. The WFFA events annually receive over 200 million engagements online and connect to audience across the world through social media platforms like Facebook, Instagram, YouTube, Threads and TikTok.

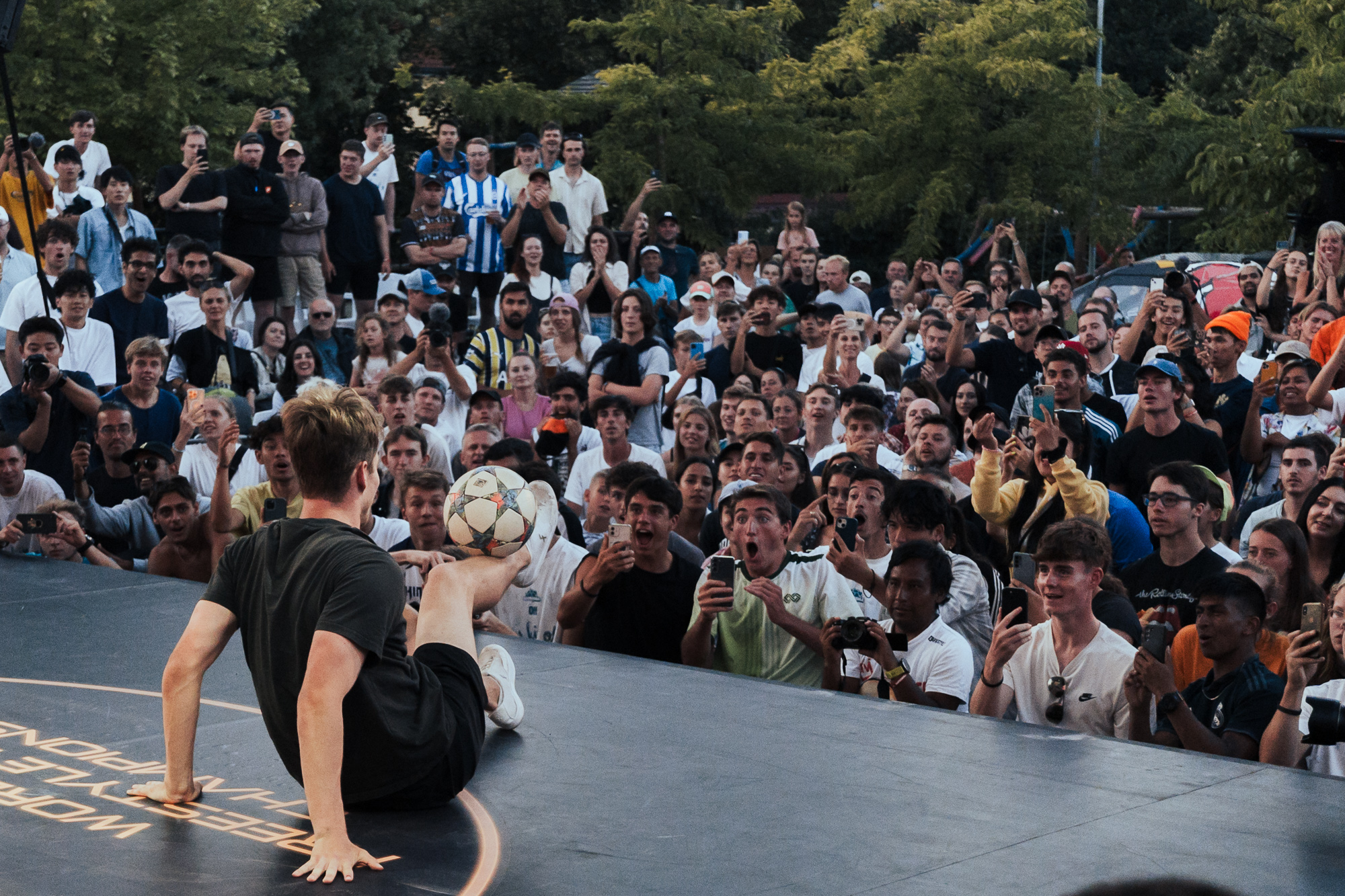
Freestyler Jesse Marlet (Netherlands) performs in front of the crowd at the Super Ball World Open in Prague, Czech Republic in 2023.

The key events in the official freestyle football calendar include:

- WFFA Super Ball World Open, the biggest freestyle football open tournament in the world, held yearly since 2009.
- WFFA World Frestyle Football Championship (WFFC), the most prestigious event in the freestyle football global circuit, happening on a yearly basis and formerly known as Red Bull Street Style.
- WFFA Pulse Series, the official regional qualifiers for the WFFC, which include five continental championships in North America, South America, Europe, Asia-Pacific and Africa.
- WFFA NextGen World Championship, a global online tournament for athletes under the age of 16.

Besides the official competitive circuit, the global freestyle football community organises a collection of national and open tournaments and meetings with the support of the WFFA, including, among many others, the French Championship, the Japanese Championship (JFFC), the Mexican Championship, the German Championship and the Sorø Meet in Denmark.
