= Kazincbarcika Subregion =

Coordinates: 48°19′N 20°35′E

Kazincbarcika Subregion Borsod-Abaúj-Zemplén third largest of the subregions of Hungary, with an area of 499.3 square kilometres and population of 60,332 in 2009.

== Settlements ==
- Alsószuha
- Alsótelekes
- Bánhorváti
- Berente
- Dédestapolcsány
- Dövény
- Felsőkelecsény
- Felsőnyárád
- Felsőtelekes
- Imola
- Izsófalva
- Jákfalva
- Kánó
- Kazincbarcika
- Kurityán
- Mályinka
- Múcsony
- Nagybarca
- Ormosbánya
- Ragály
- Rudabánya
- Rudolftelep
- Sajógalgóc
- Sajóivánka
- Sajókaza
- Szuhafő
- Szuhakálló
- Tardona
- Trizs
- Vadna
- Zádorfalva
- Zubogy

== See also ==
- Kazincbarcika District (from 2013)
