= List of palaces and mansions in Borsod-Abaúj-Zemplén County =

This is a list of palaces and mansions in Borsod-Abaúj-Zemplén County in Hungary.

== List of palaces and mansions in Borsod-Abaúj-Zemplén County ==
Name	Location	Established	Architect	Style	Family	Picture	Present function
Bárczay Mansion	Abaújkér						
Patay Mansion	Abaújszántó						
Platthy Palace	Bánhorváti	1752		Baroque	Platthy		
Vay-Serényi Mansion	Bánréve						
Lónyay Mansion	Bodrogolaszi						
Péchy-Zichy Mansion	Boldogkőváralja						
Bombelles Mansion	Bózsva						
Serényi Mansion	Dédestapolcsány	1898-1903		Eclecticism	Serényi		
Vay Mansion	Dubicsány						
L'Huillier-Coburg Palace	Edelény	1715-1730		Baroque	L'Huillier; Coburg		Museum
Rhédey Mansion	Emőd						
Szirmay Mansion	Erdőbénye						
Fáy Mansion	Fáj						
Rákóczi Mansion	Felsővadász	16th century		Romanticism	Rákóczi; Meskó; Vay		
Bárczay Mansion	Felsőzsolca	1773		Classicism	Fáy		Museum
Károlyi Mansion	Füzérradvány						
Törley Mansion	Galvács	1870			Törley		
Dőry Mansion	Girincs						
Old Vay Mansion	Golop	1592		Renaissance	Vay		
New Vay Mansion	Golop	19th century		Classicism	Vay		
Pálffy Mansion	Gönc	1780		Eclecticism / Zopf	Pálffy		
Györgytarló Mansion	Györgytarló						
Hejce Mansion	Hejce						
Sardagna Mansion	Hernádvécse						
Melczer Mansion	Kéked	15-16th century		Gothic	Kékedy; Zombory; Melczer		
Scholtz-Albin Mansion	Krasznokvajda						
Szentimrey Mansion	Krasznokvajda						
Pallavicini Mansion	Kurityán						
Édes Mansion	Mezőcsát						
Márk Mansion	Mezőcsát						
Dobozy Mansion	Mezőcsát	1889		Eclecticism	Dobozy		
Bárczay Mansion	Miskolc						
Miskolc Hunting Lodge	Miskolc						
Andrássy Mansion	Monok						
Monok Mansion	Monok	1570-1580		Renaissance; Classicism	Monaky		
Mágóchy-Alaghy-Sennyei Mansion	Pácin	1533–1556		Renaissance; Romanticism	Alaghy; Sennyei		Museum
Bárczay Mansion	Pere						
Pallavicini Mansion	Pusztaradvány			Historicism; Neoclassicism	Pallavicini		Hotel
Serényi Mansion	Putnok	1834		Classicism	Serényi		
Balassa Mansion	Ragály	1743		Baroque; Eclecticism	Ragály; Balassa		
Radvánszky Mansion	Sajókaza						
Erdődy Hunting Lodge	Sajólád						
Eötvös-Gorove Mansion	Sály						
Fáy Mansion	Sáta						
Waldbott Mansion	Sátoraljaújhely	18th century		Baroque	Szirmay; Waldbott		Old people's home
Szirmay Mansion	Sátoraljaújhely						
Hönig Mansion	Szalaszend						
Bónis-Gedeon Mansion	Szalonna						
Szemere Mansion	Szemere	1649		Baroque; Classicism	Szemere		School
Csáky Mansion	Szendrő	1694		Baroque	Csáky		House of culture
Csáky–Hunyady Mansion	Szikszó	1700			Csáky; Hunyadi		Kindergaten
Klein Mansion	Szirma (part of Miskolc)	1902		Secession	Klein		Demolished in 1944
Szirmay Mansion	Szirmabesenyő	18th century		Baroque	Szirmay		
Patay Mansion	Taktabáj						
Maillot Mansion	Tállya						
Andrássy Mansion	Tarcal	18th century		Baroque; Classicism	Andrássy		Hotel
Degenfeld Mansion	Tarcal						
Károlyi Hunting Lodge	Telkibánya						
Bottlik Mansion	Tibolddaróc						
Rákóczi-Dessewffy Mansion	Tokaj						
Kurucz Mansion or Rákóczi Mansion	Tolcsva						
Szirmay Mansion	Tolcsva						
Dessewffy Mansion	Tolcsva						
Hadik Mansion	Tornanádaska						
Csáky-Pallavicini Mansion	Tornyosnémeti						
Odescalchi Mansion	Vatta						

== See also ==
- List of palaces and mansions in Hungary
- List of castles in Hungary

== Literature ==
- Zsolt Virág : Magyar Kastélylexikon - Borsod-Abaúj-Zemplén megye kastélyai, 2006
