= Kazincbarcika District =

Coordinates: 48.3167°N 20.5833°E

Kazincbarcika District Kazincbarcikai járás
- Districts of Hungary
- Coat of arms

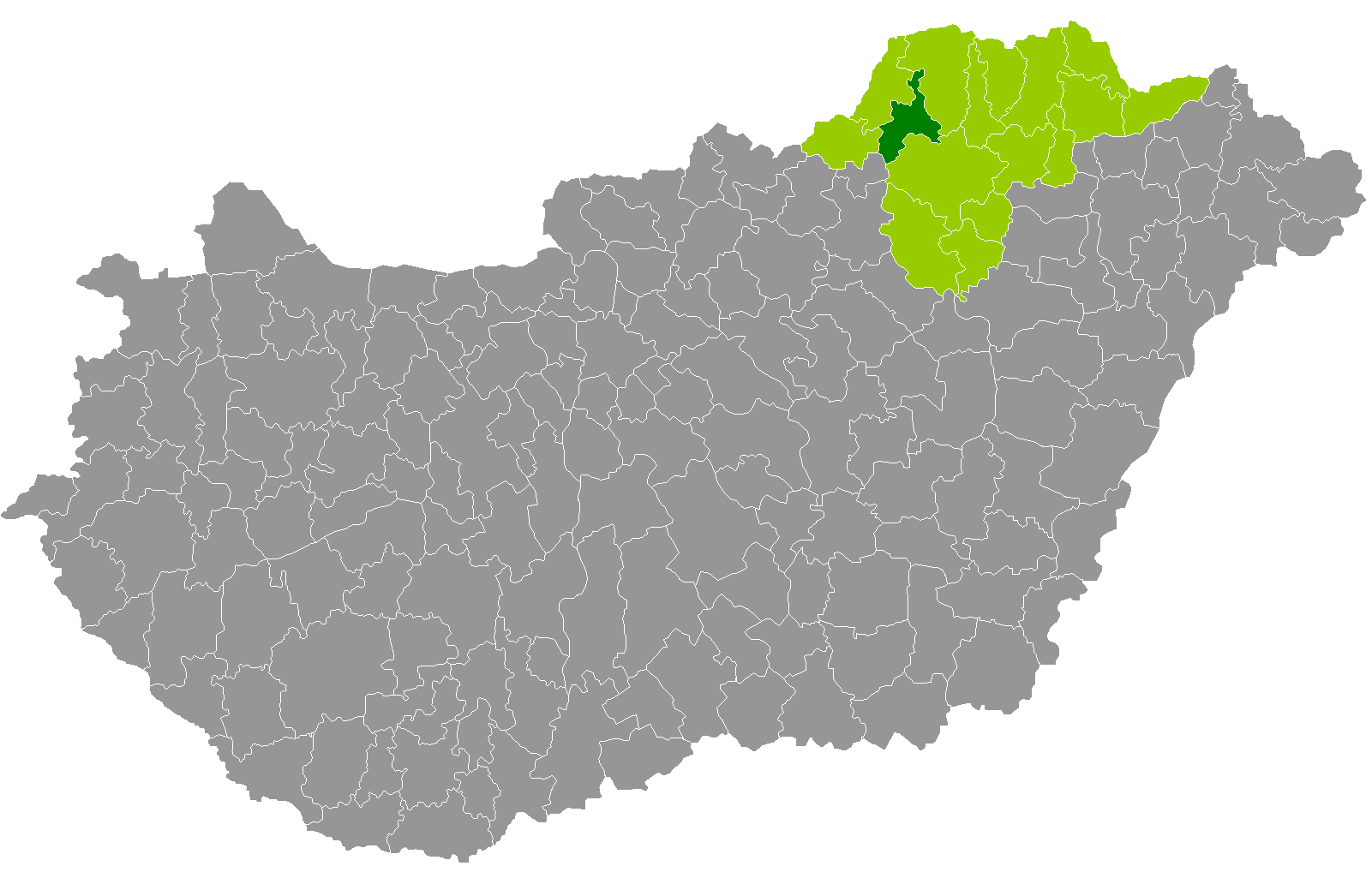
- Kazincbarcika District within Hungary and Borsod-Abaúj-Zemplén County.
- Country: Hungary
- County: Borsod-Abaúj-Zemplén
- District seat: Kazincbarcika

Area
  - Total: 341.70 km^{2} (131.93 sq mi)
  - Rank: 12th in Borsod-Abaúj-Zemplén

Population (2011 census)
  - Total: 66,470
  - Rank: 2nd in Borsod-Abaúj-Zemplén
  - Density: 193/km^{2} (500/sq mi)

Kazincbarcika (Hungarian: Kazincbarcikai járás) is a district in north-western part of Borsod-Abaúj-Zemplén County. Kazincbarcika is also the name of the town where the district seat is found. The district is located in the Northern Hungary Statistical Region.

== Geography ==
Kazincbarcika District borders with Edelény District northeast, Miskolc District to the southeast, Bélapátfalva District (Heves County) to the southwest, Ózd District to the west, Putnok District to the northwest. The number of the inhabited places in Kazincbarcika District is 22.

== Municipalities ==
The district has 3 town, 2 large villages and 17 villages. (ordered by population, as of 1 January 2012)

- Alacska (748)
- Alsótelekes (135)
- Bánhorváti (1,335)
- Berente (1,117)
- Dédestapolcsány (1,426)
- Felsőtelekes (683)
- Izsófalva (1,739)
- **Kazincbarcika** (28,664) – district seat
- Kurityán (1,598)
- Mályinka (475)
- Múcsony (3,095)
- Nagybarca (1,049)
- Ormosbánya (1,670)
- **Rudabánya** (2,488)
- Rudolftelep (714)
- Sajógalgóc (365)
- Sajóivánka (605)
- Sajókaza (3,403)
- **Sajószentpéter** (11,965)
- Szuhakálló (946)
- Tardona (1,011)
- Vadna (597)

The bolded municipalities are cities, italics municipalities are large villages.

== Demographics ==
Religion in Kazincbarcika District (2011 census)
1. Catholic Church (25.8%)
2. Greek Catholicism (5.20%)
3. Calvinism (21.4%)
4. Lutheranism (0.60%)
5. Other religions (1.70%)
6. Non-religious (19.3%)
7. Atheists (1.20%)
8. Undeclared (24.8%)

In 2011, it had a population of 66,470 and the population density was 195/km^{2}.

Year	County population	Change
2011	66,470	n/a

=== Ethnicity ===
Besides the Hungarian majority, the main minorities are the Roma (approx. 4,000), German (350), Polish and Rusyn (150).

Total population (2011 census): 66,470
Ethnic groups (2011 census): Identified themselves: 63,350 persons:

- Hungarians: 58,247 (91.94%)
- Gypsies: 3,919 (6.18%)
- Others and indefinable: 1,184 (1.87%)

Approx. 3,000 persons in Kazincbarcika District did not declare their ethnic group at the 2011 census.

=== Religion ===
Religious adherence in the county according to 2011 census:

- Catholic – 20,582 (Roman Catholic – 17,135; Greek Catholic – 3,444);
- Reformed – 14,222;
- Evangelical – 422;
- other religions – 1,167;
- Non-religious – 12,810;
- Atheism – 790;
- Undeclared – 16,477.

== Gallery ==
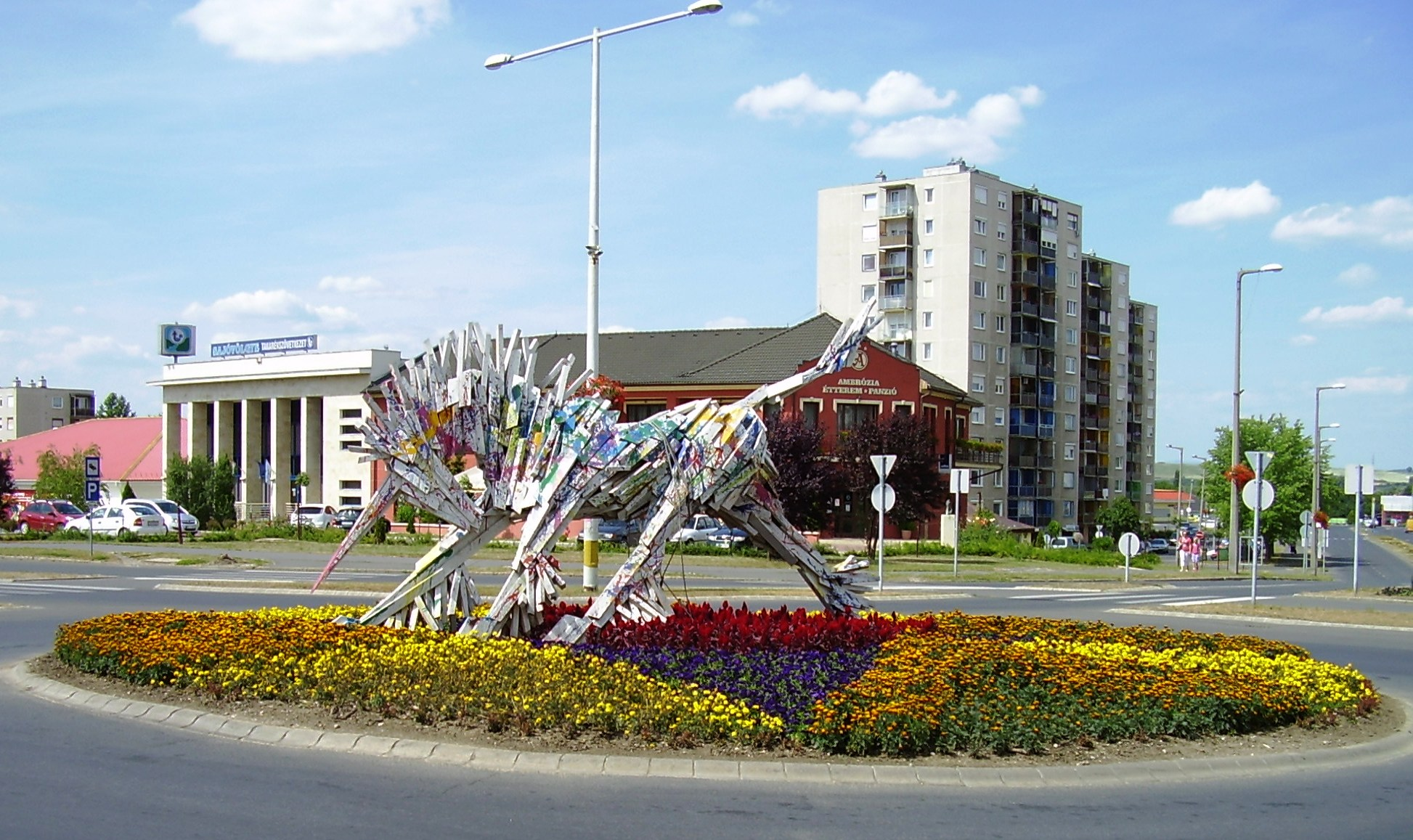
Kazincbarcika, the district seat

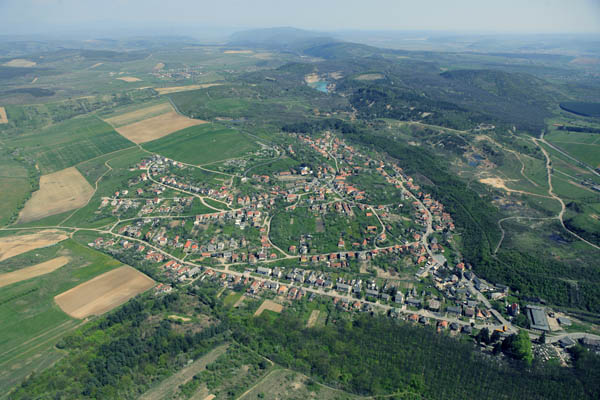
Aerial view of Rudabánya

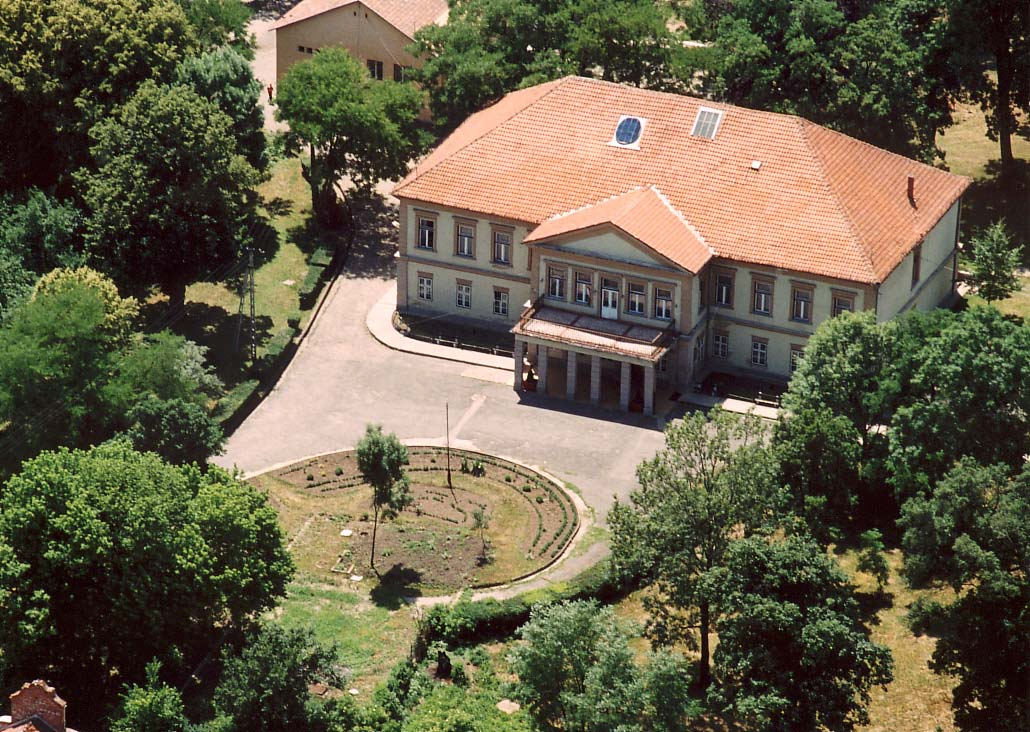
Pallavicini Mansion in Kurityán

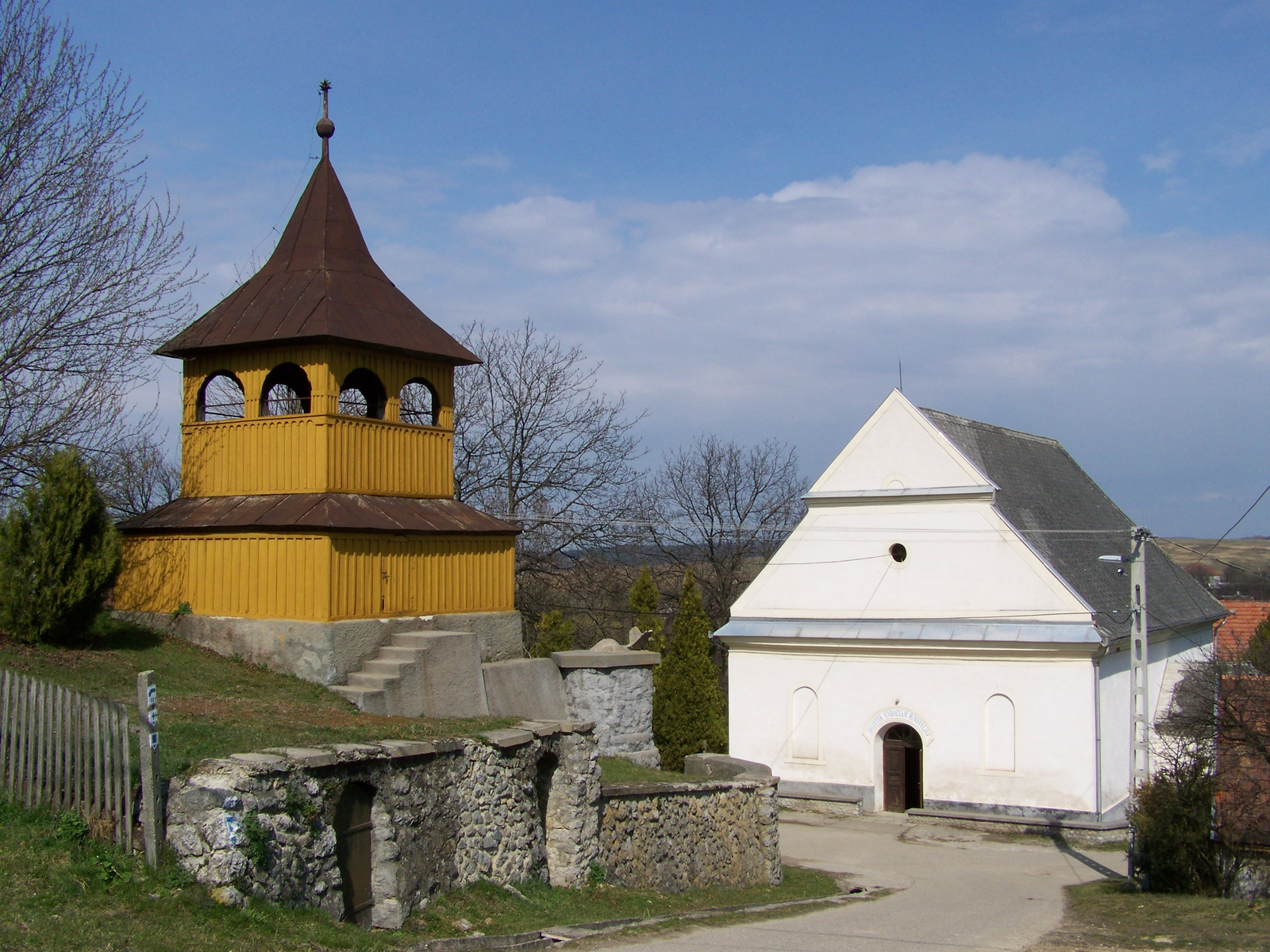
Reformed Church in Mályinka

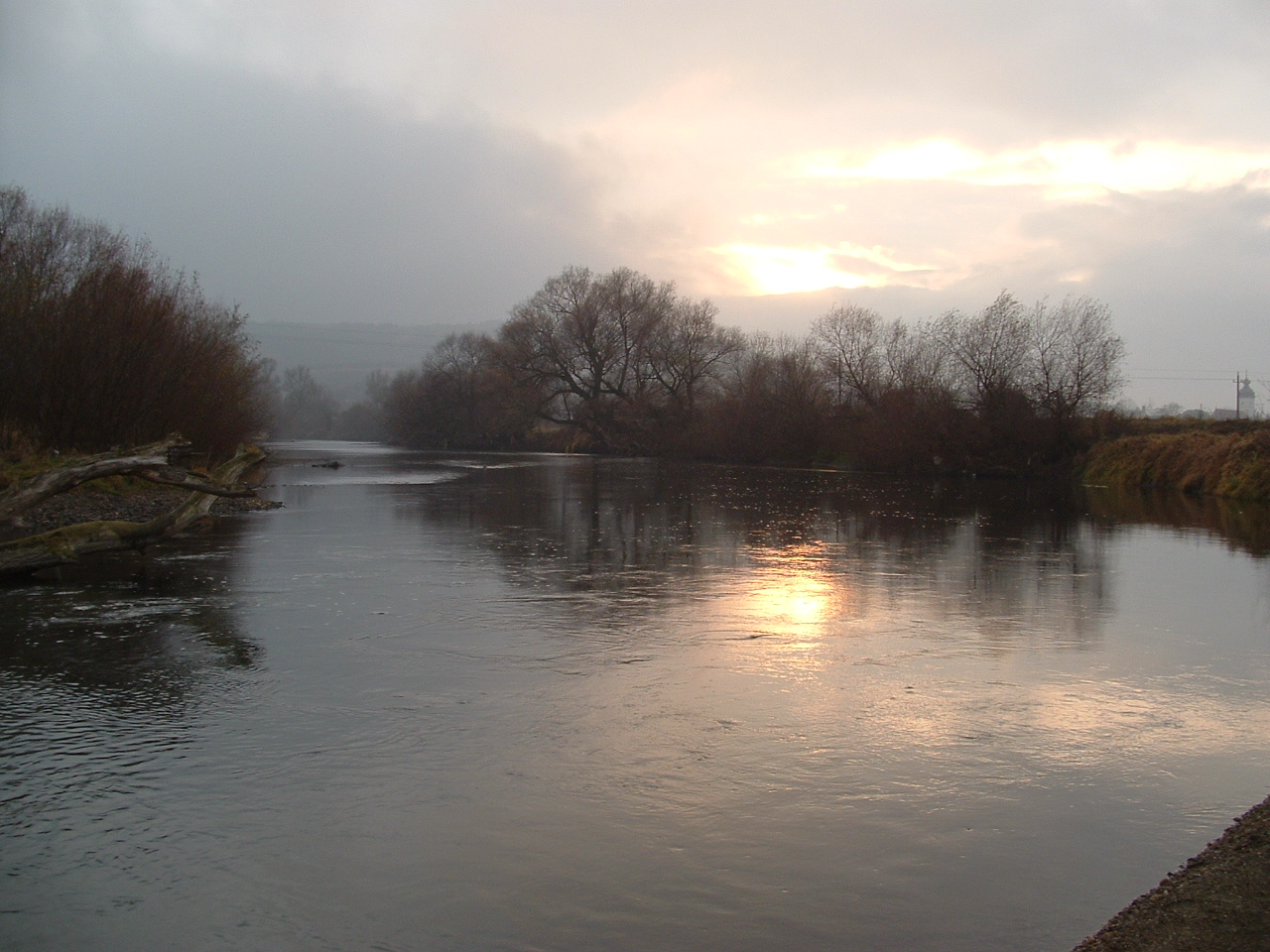
Sajó river near Sajószentpéter

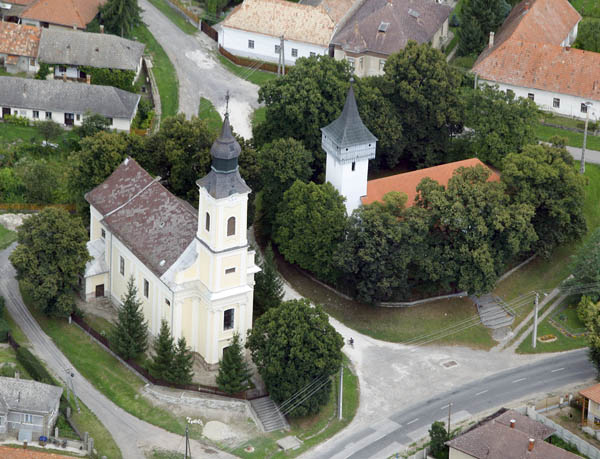
Aerial view of Bánhorváti

== See also ==
- List of cities and towns of Hungary
- Kazincbarcika Subregion (until 2013)
