= Mályinka =

- Village
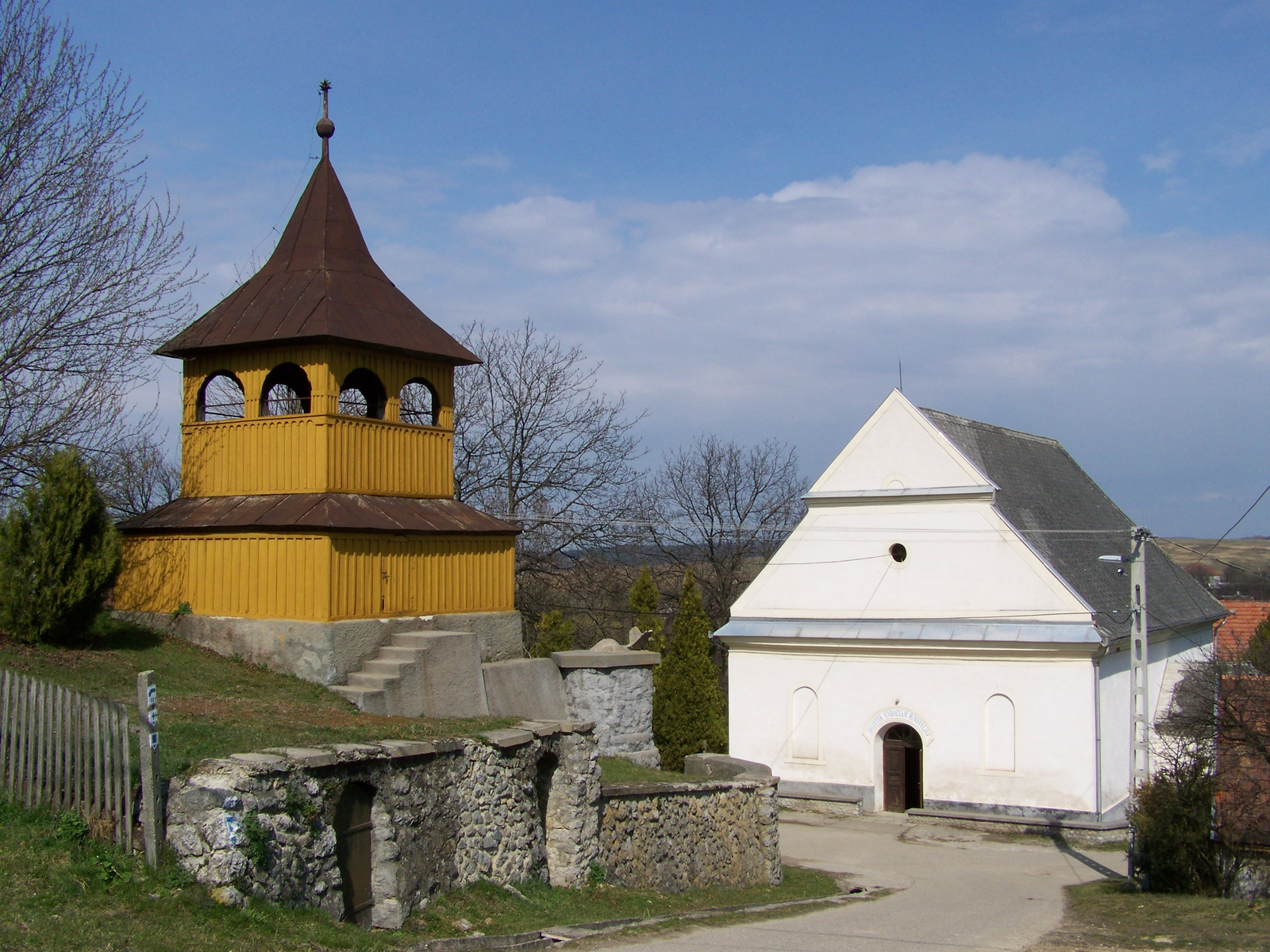

- Flag Coat of arms

- Location of Mályinka
- Coordinates: 48.15668°N 20.49441°E
- Country: Hungary
- Region: Northern Hungary
- County: Borsod-Abaúj-Zemplén
- District: Kazincbarcika

Area
  - Total: 24.2 km^{2} (9.3 sq mi)

Population (1 January 2026)
  - Total: 448
  - Density: 18.5/km^{2} (47.9/sq mi)
- Time zone: UTC+1 (CET)
  - Summer (DST): UTC+2 (CEST)
- Postal code: 3645
- Area code: (+36) 48
- Website: www.malyinka.hu

Mályinka is a village in Borsod-Abaúj-Zemplén County in northeastern Hungary. Has road connection to the near Dédestapolcsány, Tardona, Nagyvisnyó. The closest town is Kazincbarcika.

Mályinka is located on the north side of Bükk Mountains. Because of the picturesque landscape the village is on the path of the National Blue Trail.
