= Miklós Izsó =

Hungarian sculptor

- Izsó Miklós
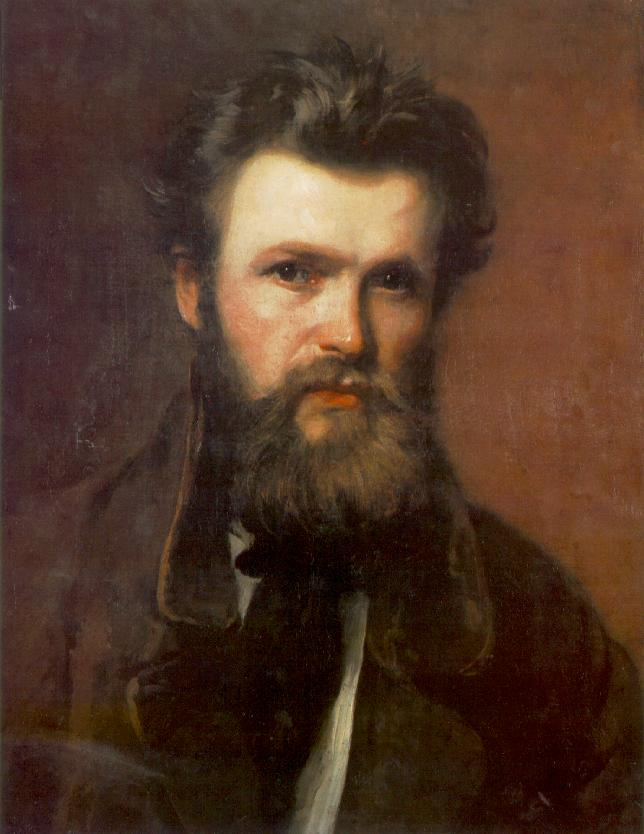
- Portrait of Miklós Izsó by Bertalan Székely
- Born: September 9, 1831; Disznós-Horvát
- Died: May 29, 1875 (aged 43); Budapest
- Known for: Sculptor
- Style: Classicism and academic

Miklós Izsó (Hungarian: Izsó Miklós, German: Nikolaus Izsó; September 9, 1831, Disznós-Horvát (now "Izsófalva", Borsod-Abaúj-Zemplén County, north-east Hungary) – May 29, 1875, Budapest) was a Hungarian sculptor whose sculptural style integrated elements of classicism and academic style.
