= Gyula Grolmusz =

Hungarian footballer (1952–2001)

Personal information
- Full name: Gyula Grolmusz
- Date of birth: July 29, 1952
- Place of birth: Ormosbánya, Borsod–Abaúj–Zemplén, Hungary
- Date of death: May 14, 2001 (aged 53)
- Place of death: Hungary
- Position: Forward

Senior career*
Years	Team	Apps	(Gls)
1969–1974	Ormosbányai Bányász		
1974–1976	Borsodi Bányász		
1976–1980	Diósgyőri VTK	23	(3)
1980–1981	Kazincbarcikai		
1981–1984	Sajóbábonyi		
- * Club domestic league appearances and goals

Gyula Grolmusz (July 29, 1952 – May 14, 2001) was a Hungarian footballer. He played as forward for Diósgyőri VTK throughout the late 1970s as he would achieve various titles for the club throughout the era.

== Career ==
Following several seasons with Ormosbányai Bányász and Borsodi Bányász in the earlier half of the 1970s, he would sign with Diósgyőri VTK for the 1976–77 Nemzeti Bajnokság I. This season would also have Grolmusz also be a part of the winning squad for the 1976–77 Magyar Kupa with this being the club's first title in that tournament with Grolmusz scoring two goals throughout the season. This would earn the club qualification for the 1977–78 European Cup Winners' Cup with the club facing off Turkish side Beşiktaş as despite initially losing to the Black Eagles with a 2–0 lead at Istanbul, would make a comeback with a 5–0 home victory. In the second round, they faced Yugoslav side Hajduk Split as the club would be eliminated via penalty shoot-out after both legs ended in draws with Grolmusz playing in two matches.

In the 1978–79 Nemzeti Bajnokság I, Grolmusz played in 11 matches and scored two goals as the club would end in third place by the end of the season. This would earn the club qualification for the 1979–80 UEFA Cup as the both legs of the first round saw the club emerge victorious over Austrian side Rapid Wien with similar results against Scottish side Dundee United in the second round. This initial success would come to an end by the third round against Kaiserslautern in which by the end of both legs, Diósgyőri lost 8–1 as this would end up being the final season for Grolmusz for the club.

== Later life ==
Grolmusz died suddenly on May 14, 2001. His funeral took place on the 23rd at the Ormosbánya cemetery.
