= Tibor Tollas =

Tibor Tollas (or with full name Tibor Kecskési Tollas) (Nagybarca, Hungary 21 December 1920 – Munich, Germany 19 July 1997) was a Hungarian poet, chief editor of the newspaper Nemzetőr.

== Life ==
He was born in Nagybarca, Hungary on 21 December 1920. In his ancestry were soldiers who had served under Lajos Kossuth; he followed this tradition, attending Military School in Sopron and, later, the Ludovica Military Academy in Budapest. By 1941 he was serving as a lieutenant in the Hungarian Army. He served as an officer during the Second World War, including as commander of the ghetto in Beregszász, and after it. In 1945 he was wounded in both hands. In 1947 he was arrested, charged with war crimes, tried and convicted by the People's Court, and jailed for nine years. He served this sentence in Budapest, Vác and Tatabánya (in a "mile work camp"), and was freed in 1956. In the Revolution of 1956 he served as a liaison officer. After the suppression of the 1956 Revolution he left Hungary. On 1 December 1956, with his former jail fellows, he founded the emigrant newspaper Nemzetőr (Nation's guard), published in Munich. He was the chief editor of this newspaper for 40 years.

Tollas denied involvement in war crimes, but continued to espouse extreme right-wing views for the rest of his life. In 1975, a planned lecture in Austria was disrupted after a protest by Simon Wiesenthal.

He was one of the few surviving emigres of 1956 when Soviet troops left Hungary in 1990–91, and was able to return home permanently. He died on 19 July 1997 in Munich, Germany.

== Works ==
- Füveskert (Anthology), Vienna, 1957. then Budapest, 1995. (In German: Munich, 1957, In Italian: Florence, 1958, In Russian: Buenos Aires, 1958, In Spanish: Buenos Aires, 1959, In Norwegian, In Danish: Oslo, 1959, In English: New York, 1966.)
- …csak ennyi fény maradt. (Poems, 1945–1960), Brussels, 1960.
- African Mission (with Tamás Kürthy), Munich, 1963.
- Gloria victis. Az 1956-os magyar szabadságharc költői visszhangja a nagyvilágban. (Poems collected by Tibor Tollas), Munich, 1966.
- Járdaszigeten (Poem), Munich, 1967.
- Eszterlánc (Poem), Munich, 1969.
- Gloria victis. Az 1956-os magyar szabadságharc költői visszhangja a nagyvilágban. (Poems collected by Tibor Tollas), Munich, 1973.
- Irgalmas fák. (Poem), Munich, 1975.
- Bányászok, (Poem), Munich-São Paulo, 1976.
- Évgyűrűk, (Poems, translations), Munich, 1979.
- Forgószélben. (Selected poems), Munich, 1983, In English: Chicago, 1990.
- Varázskör (Poem), Munich, 1988.
- Varázskör – Forgószélben, (Selected poems), 1989.
- Forgószélben – In Whirlwind, (Selected poems in English and Hungarian), Chicago, 1990.
- Hazafelé. Negyven év válogatott versei (Ed. Sándor Agócs), Lakitelek, 1991.
- Füveskert 1954-1995, (Edited with Rudolf Pfitzner, Kamil Kárpáti and Bálint Tóth), 1995.
- Bebádogoztak minden ablakot. (Multilingual minibook), Lakitelek, 1995.
