= Gábor Szeremlei =

Gábor Szeremlei (1807 Disznóshorvát – 1867 Sárospatak) was a Hungarian Protestant theologian, professor and doctor of philosophy.

== Life ==
Szeremlei was born in 1807 in Disznóshorvát (today Izsófalva), Borsod county. His mother was the Czech-born Anna Hofman, His father was Sámuel Szeremlei Császár (the pastor of Disznóshorvát from 1806). The exact date of his birth is unknown, because his birth wasn't registered in the baptismal birth register. The birth year is sure, because he was born after his father arrived to Disznóshorvát, and in 1808 a younger brother's name was registered in Disznóshorvát.

Szeremlei started his studies in Disznóshorvát. In 1813 his father went to Lak, where the young Gábor continued his studies. Later he went to Sárospatak, where he completed his studies. Then he worked there as a public teacher and assistant professor. In 1835 he went abroad. He learned theology in Vienna first, then in Berlin. When he arrived home he was a pastor in Felső-nyárád, and from 1839 he was a theology teacher in Máramarossziget. From 1841 he started to teach policy, then philosophical subjects. In 1851 he was appointed the Professor of the Protestant theological faculty in Vienna. In 1855 he went back to Sárospatak, where he led the department of dogmatics. He died in 1867 (26 January) in Sárospatak.

== Career ==
Gábor Szeremlei was a Protestant theologian, professor and doctor of philosophy. In 1862 he was honored for his work in the field of theological literature by theological doctorate in Vienna. According to his contemporaries, he taught successfully and effectively.

He was pastor in Felső-nyárád when his first writings were published in the Atheneum (1838-1841). He was also one of the founders of the Sárospatak Booklets (Sárospataki Füzetek).

== Works ==
His major works dealt with the issues of theology, policy, pedagogy and jurisprudence.

- New philosophy; Pest 1841 (Új filozófia)
- Principles of Protestantism, Sárospatak Booklets 1857 (A protestantizmus elve)
- Christian theology – Sárospatak 1859-1862 (Keresztény vallástudomány)

Textbooks

- Short outline of geography; Sárospatak, 1845 (A földrajz rövid vázlata – for primary schools)
- Geographical handbook; Sárospaak, 1845 (Geographiai kézikönyv – for high schools)
- Pedagogy; Sárospatak, 1845 (Neveléstan)
