= Kéked =

Coordinates: 48°33′N 21°21′E

- Village
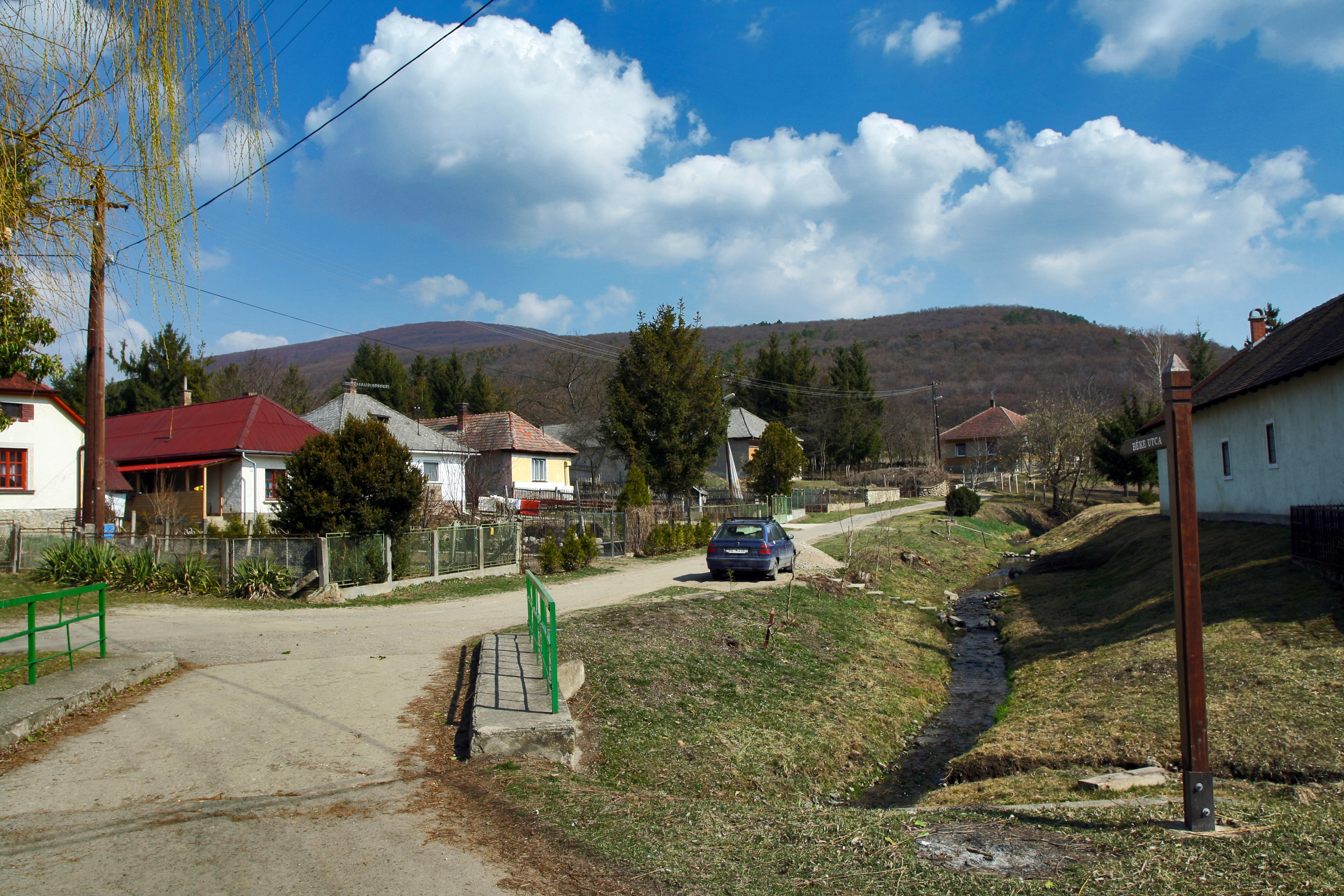
- View of the village
- Interactive map of Kéked
- Country: Hungary
- Regions: Northern Hungary
- County: Borsod-Abaúj-Zemplén County

Area
  - Total: 13.01 km^{2} (5.02 sq mi)

Population (2015)
  - Total: 178
- Time zone: UTC+1 (CET)
  - Summer (DST): UTC+2 (CEST)
- Website: http://www.keked.hu

Kéked is a village in Borsod-Abaúj-Zemplén County in northeastern Hungary.

== History ==
The settlement was first mentioned in 1297 as Keked. In 1317 as Kekud, in 1319 as Quequed, between 1332–1335 as Quequed, Kykit, Kekuk and Kekud.

The 2.8 km long connecting road between Kéked and Trstené pri Hornáde was inaugurated on 21 October 2013.
