= Sajóivánka =

Coordinates: 48°16′N 20°35′E

- Village
- Interactive map of Sajóivánka
- Country: Hungary
- Regions: Northern Hungary
- County: Borsod-Abaúj-Zemplén County
- Time zone: UTC+1 (CET)
  - Summer (DST): UTC+2 (CEST)

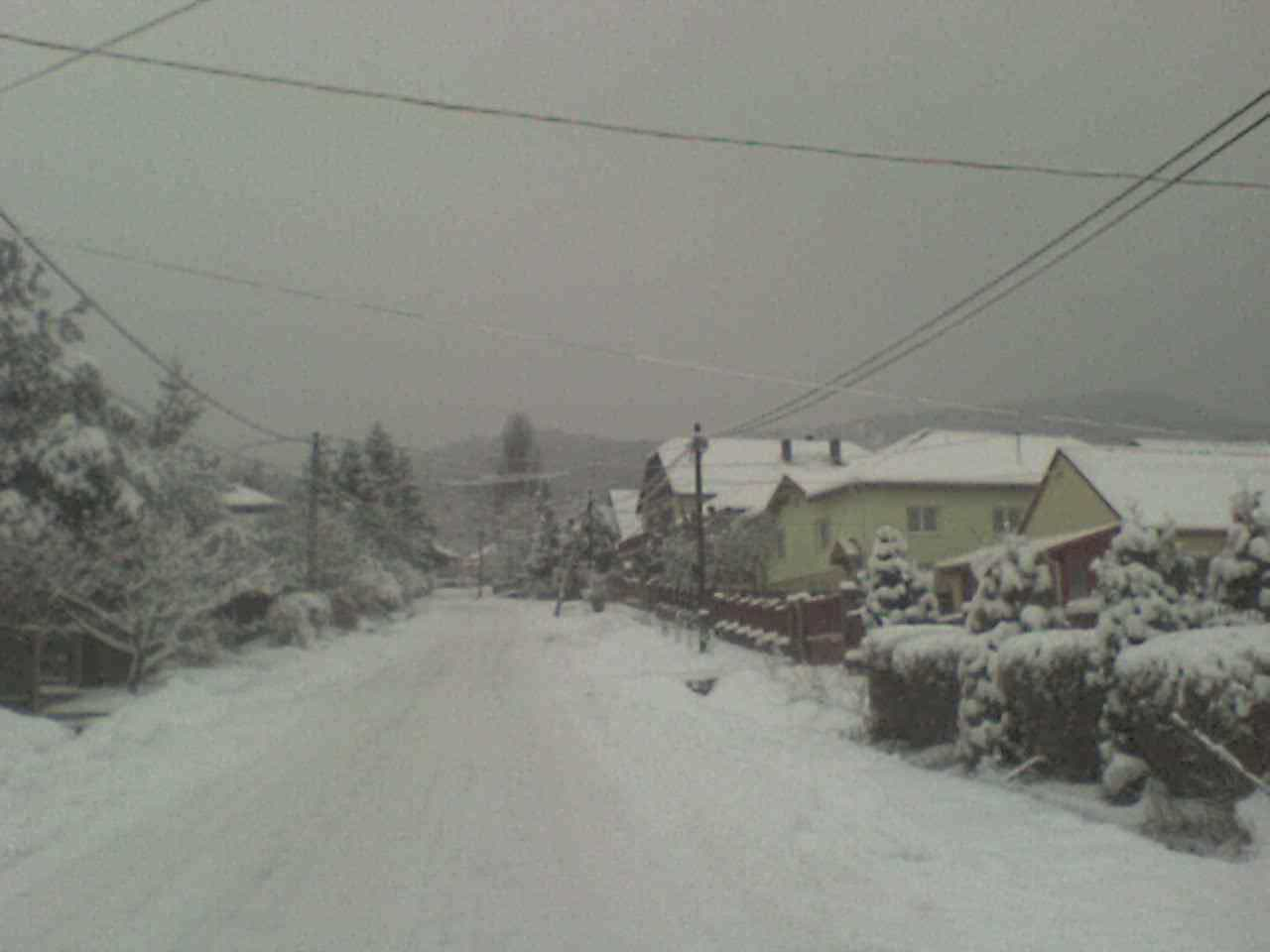

Sajóivánka is a village in the Kazincbarcika District of Borsod-Abaúj-Zemplén County in northeastern Hungary.

== Public life ==
=== Mayors ===
- 1990-1994: Gáborné Szabon (independent)
- 1994-1998: János Gáspár (independent)
- 1998-2002: János Gáspár (independent)
- 2002-2006: Zoltán Geleta (independent)
- 2006-2010: Zoltán Geleta (independent)
- 2010-2014: Ottó Seszták (independent)
- 2014-2019: Ottó Seszták (independent)
- 2019-2024: Ottó Seszták (independent)
- In the 2024 election, both Ottó Seszták and Angelika Mándoki received exactly 182 votes, after recounting. This means a by-election will be held.
