= Vadna =

- Village
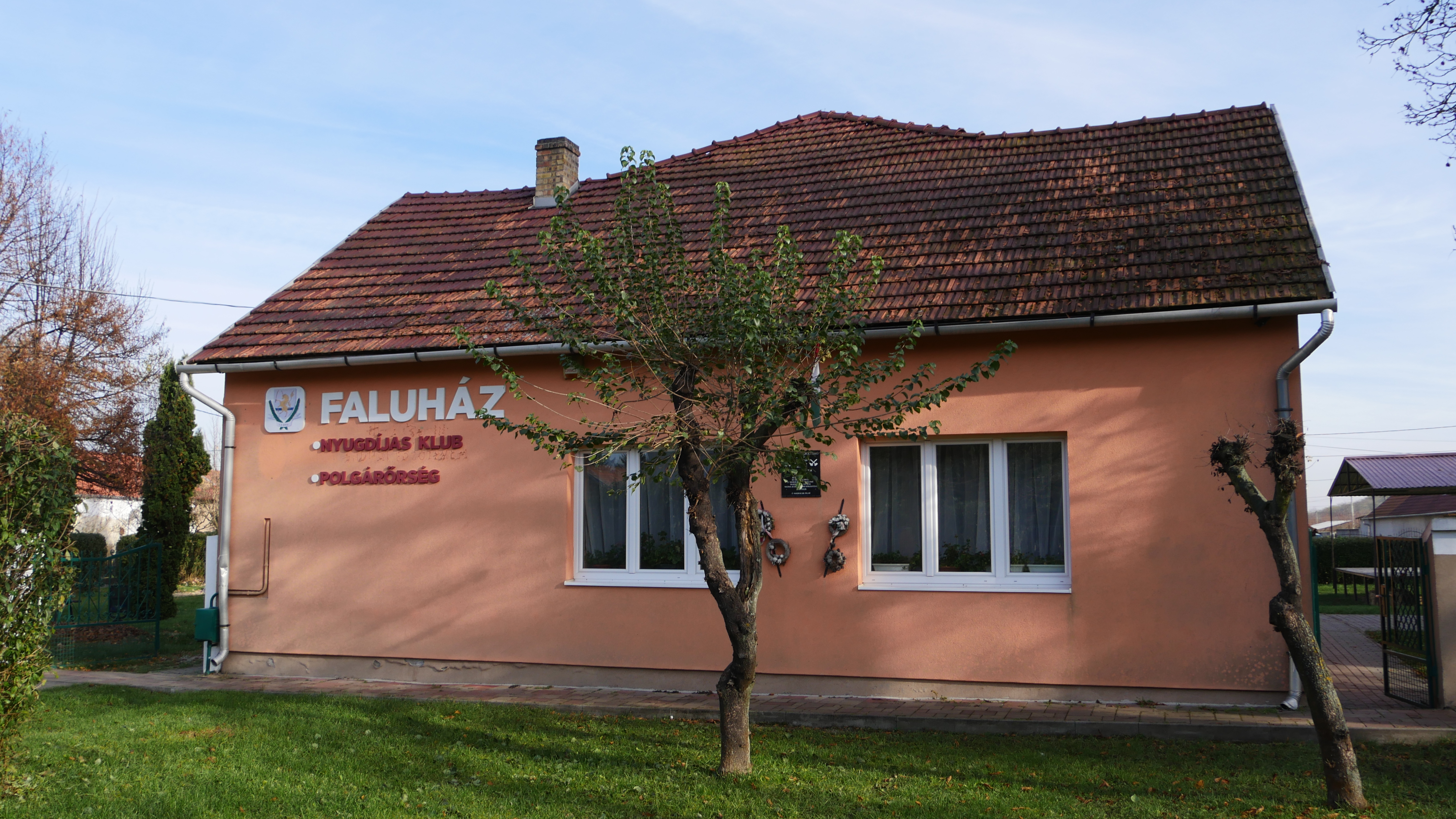
- Village hall

- Flag Coat of arms

- Location of Vadna
- Coordinates: 48.27299°N 20.55273°E
- Country: Hungary
- Region: Northern Hungary
- County: Borsod-Abaúj-Zemplén
- District: Kazincbarcika

Area
  - Total: 7.81 km^{2} (3.02 sq mi)

Population (1 January 2025)
  - Total: 614
  - Density: 78.6/km^{2} (204/sq mi)
- Time zone: UTC+1 (CET)
  - Summer (DST): UTC+2 (CEST)
- Postal code: 3636
- Area code: (+36) 48
- Website: www.vadna.hu

Vadna is a village in Borsod-Abaúj-Zemplén county, Hungary.

== Etymology ==
The name comes from Slavic/Slovak vodná derived from voda (water). Wodna (1237—1242, falsum dated to 1237).
