= Szuhakálló =

- Village
- Flag Coat of arms

- Location of Szuhakálló
- Coordinates: 48.28297°N 20.65670°E
- Country: Hungary
- Region: Northern Hungary
- County: Borsod-Abaúj-Zemplén
- District: Kazincbarcika

Area
  - Total: 6.96 km^{2} (2.69 sq mi)

Population (1 January 2026)
  - Total: 950
  - Density: 140/km^{2} (350/sq mi)
- Time zone: UTC+1 (CET)
  - Summer (DST): UTC+2 (CEST)
- Postal code: 3731
- Area code: (+36) 48
- Website: www.szuhakallo.hu

Szuhakálló is a village in Borsod-Abaúj-Zemplén county, Hungary.
