= Trstené pri Hornáde =

Trstené pri Hornáde Abaújnádasd
- Municipality
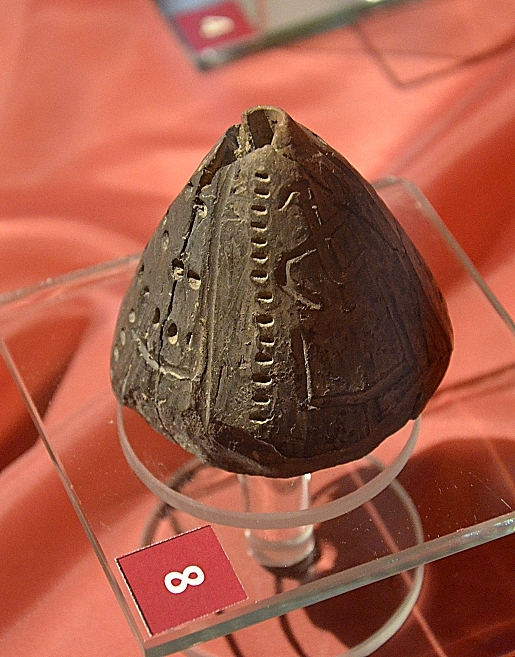
- A clay rattle from Trstené pri Hornáde that dates to the 2nd century.

- Flag

- Location of Trstené pri Hornáde in the Košice Region Location of Trstené pri Hornáde in Slovakia
- Coordinates: 48.57°N 21.33°E
- Country: Slovakia
- Region: Košice Region
- District: Košice-okolie District
- First mentioned: 1270

Government
  - Mayor: Matej Kočiš (Ind.)

Area
  - Total: 12.90 km^{2} (4.98 sq mi)
- Elevation: 175 m (574 ft)

Population (2025)
  - Total: 1,512
- Time zone: UTC+1 (CET)
  - Summer (DST): UTC+2 (CEST)
- Postal code: 441 1
- Area code: +421 55
- Vehicle registration plate (until 2022): KS
- Website: trsteneprihornade.sk

Trstené pri Hornáde (Hungarian: Abaújnádasd) is a village and municipality in Košice-okolie District in the Kosice Region of eastern Slovakia.

== History ==
In historical records the village was first mentioned in 1270.

== Geography ==
The municipality lies at an altitude of 175 metres (574 ft) and covers an area of 12.90 km^{2} (4.98 sq mi) (2025).

== Population ==
Population statistic (10 years)
Year	1995	2005	2015	2025
Count	1484	1453	1548	1512
Difference		−2.08%	+6.53%	−2.32%

Population statistic
Year	2024	2025
Count	1511	1512
Difference		+0.06%

It has a population of 1512 people (31 December 2025).

=== Ethnicity ===
Census 2021 (1+ %)
Ethnicity	Number	Fraction
Slovak	1411	95.92%
Not found out	55	3.73%
Romani	38	2.58%
Total	1471	

In year 2021 was 1471 people by ethnicity 1411 as Slovak, 55 as Not found out, 38 as Romani, 9 as Hungarian, 6 as Rusyn, 5 as Czech, 4 as Russian, 3 as Polish, 1 as Ukrainian and 1 as English.

Note on population: The difference values of population numbers in the table "Population statistic" and in the sections "Ethnicity" & "Religion" is caused by the use of various statistical methods.

=== Religion ===
Census 2021 (1+ %)
Religion	Number	Fraction
Roman Catholic Church	1139	77.43%
None	118	8.02%
Not found out	77	5.23%
Calvinist Church	61	4.15%
Greek Catholic Church	31	2.11%
Evangelical Church	17	1.16%
Total	1471	

In year 2021 was 1471 people by religion 1139 from Roman Catholic Church, 118 from None, 77 from Not found out, 61 from Calvinist Church, 31 from Greek Catholic Church, 17 from Evangelical Church, 7 from Other and not ascertained christian church, 6 from Other, 4 from Christian Congregations in Slovakia, 4 from Apostolic Church, 4 from Ad hoc movements, 2 from Eastern Orthodox Church and 1 from Paganism and natural spirituality.

== Culture ==
The village has a public library, a football playground and food facilities.
