= Szemere =

- Location of Szemere in Hungary
- Coordinates: 48.4656°N 21.0989°E
- Country: Hungary
- Region: Northern Hungary
- County: Borsod-Abaúj-Zemplén
- Subregion: Encs

Area
  - Total: 26.3 km^{2} (10.2 sq mi)

Population (2009)
  - Total: 386
  - Density: 14.7/km^{2} (38.0/sq mi)
- Time zone: UTC+1 (CET)
  - Summer (DST): UTC+2 (CEST)
- Postal code: 3866
- Area code: +36 46
- KSH code: 09830
- Website: http://szemere.hu/

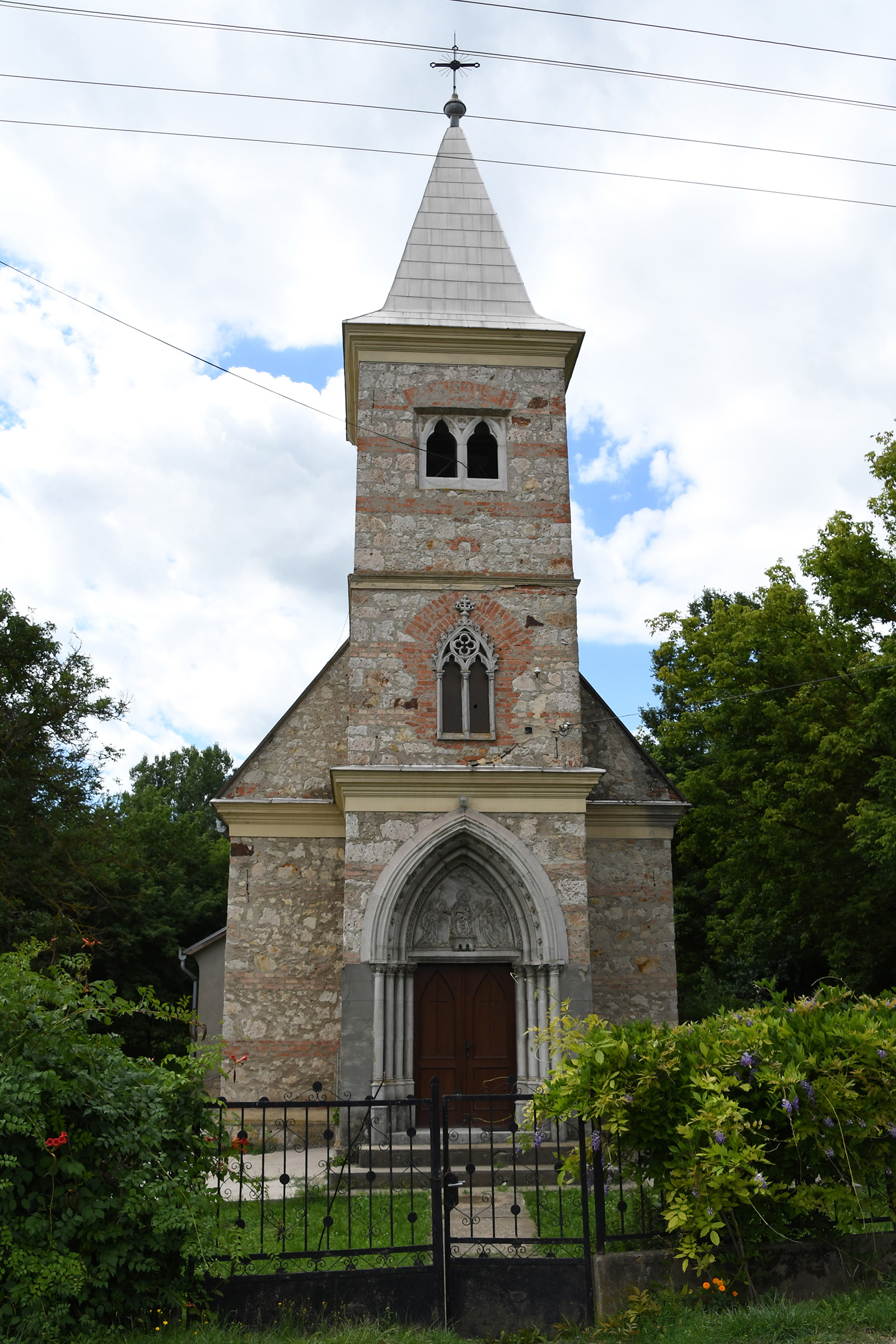
Roman Catholic church in Szemere, Hungary

Szemere is a village in Borsod-Abaúj-Zemplén County, Hungary.
