= Múcsony =

- Large village
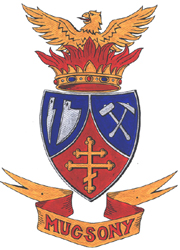
- Coat of arms

- Location within Hungary
- Coordinates: 48°16′N 20°41′E
- Country: Hungary
- County: Borsod-Abaúj-Zemplén
- District: Kazincbarcika
- Time zone: UTC+1 (CET)
  - Summer (DST): UTC+2 (CEST)
- Postal code: 3744
- Area code: (+36) 48

Múcsony (Slovak: Mučoň; Rusyn: Мучонь) is a village in Borsod-Abaúj-Zemplén County in northeastern Hungary.

== Etymology ==
The name is of Slavic origin and it probably comes from Mučín or Milčín/Miličín. 1219 Mulchun.
