= Rudolftelep =

- Village
- Flag Coat of arms

- Location of Rudolftelep
- Coordinates: 48.30901°N 20.66988°E
- Country: Hungary
- Region: Northern Hungary
- County: Borsod-Abaúj-Zemplén
- District: Kazincbarcika

Area
  - Total: 4.39 km^{2} (1.69 sq mi)

Population (1 January 2025)
  - Total: 672
  - Density: 153/km^{2} (396/sq mi)
- Time zone: UTC+1 (CET)
  - Summer (DST): UTC+2 (CEST)
- Postal code: 3742
- Area code: (+36) 48
- Website: rudolftelep.hu

Rudolftelep is a village in Borsod-Abaúj-Zemplén county, Hungary.
