= Kazincbarcika =

- Town
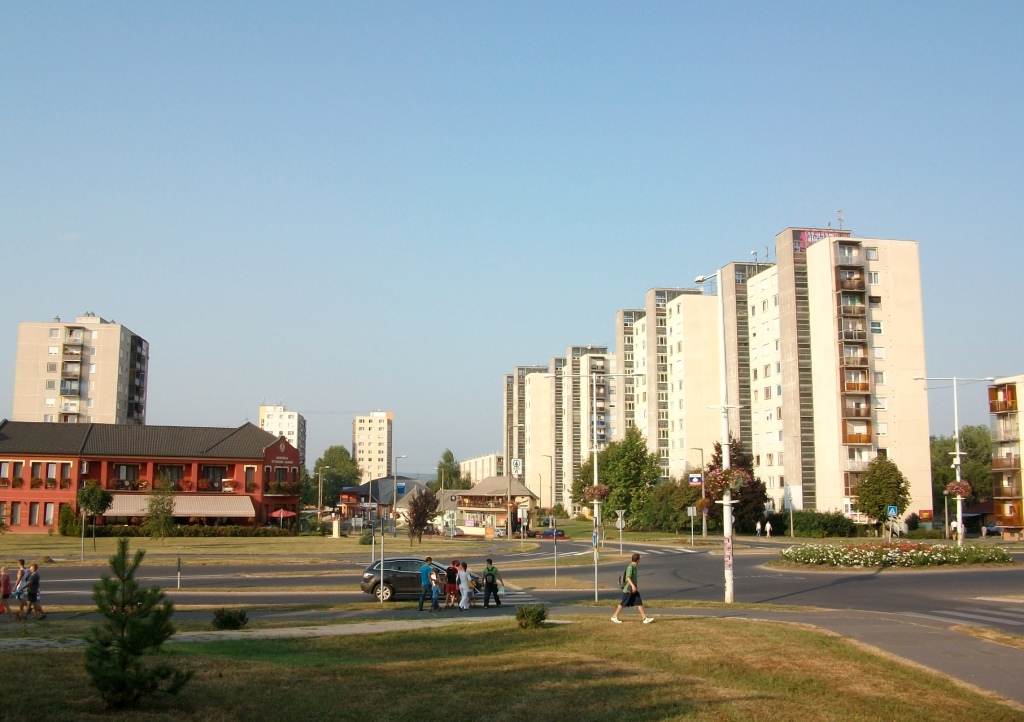
- Egressy Béni Street with typical concrete block of flats called Panelház

- Flag Coat of arms

- Location of Kazincbarcika Kazincbarcika (Europe)
- Coordinates: 48.25315°N 20.64563°E
- Country: Hungary
- County: Borsod-Abaúj-Zemplén
- District: Kazincbarcika

Area
  - Total: 36.64 km^{2} (14.15 sq mi)

Population (2010)
  - Total: 29,256
  - Density: 822.48/km^{2} (2,130.2/sq mi)
- Time zone: UTC+1 (CET)
  - Summer (DST): UTC+2 (CEST)
- Postal code: 3700
- Area code: (+36) 48
- Website: www.kazincbarcika.hu

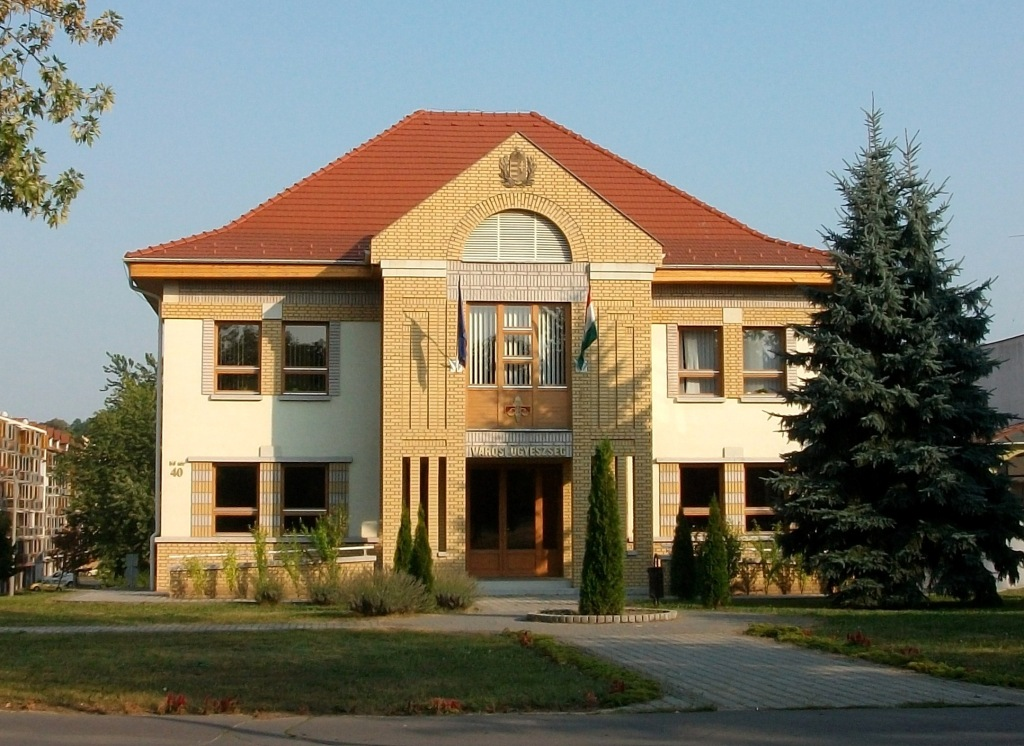
Public Prosecutors Office

Kazincbarcika is an industrial town in Borsod–Abaúj–Zemplén county, Northern Hungary. It is the district seat of Kazincbarcika District. It lies in the valley of the Sajó river, 24 kilometres (15 miles) from the county capital, Miskolc.

== History ==
Kazincbarcika was created during the Socialist industrialization, when several villages were unified with the aim of creating an industrial city to provide workers for the newly built Borsodi Vegyi Kombinát (a predecessor of today's BorsodChem). The village of Sajókazinc was first mentioned in 1240. It was a mainly agricultural village until 1850, when the first coal mine was opened. The village of Barcika came into existence with the unification of two villages, Upper- and Lower-Barcika. Although a mine was opened nearby, agriculture remained the villagers' main occupation until the 1920s, when a large power plant was built.

After World War II, Sajókazinc and Barcika were united under the name Kazincbarcika. In 1954 it was granted town status, and the nearby village of Berente was annexed. The town already had 11,000 residents. BorsodChem, founded in 1949, took an active role in developing the town, and its job opportunities drew people from all over the country.

In the 1970s Kazincbarcika already had 30,000 residents. In the 1980s mining and heavy industry faced a crisis, and the rate of unemployment was high. The district of Berente separated from the city and became an independent village, mainly due to the fact that Borsodchem was situated in this part of the town, but the residents felt more of its disadvantages than its advantages. Berente's secession from Kazincbarcika led to the newly independent village receiving the local taxes paid by the factory; it made Berente one of the richest villages in the country.

== Public life ==
=== Mayors after the end of communism in Hungary ===
- 1990-1994: Attila Ludányi (Fidesz)
- 1994-1998: Dr. Bálint Király (MSZP)
- 1998-2002: Dr. Bálint Király (MSZP)
- 2002-2006: Dr. Bálint Király (MSZP)
- 2006-2010: Péter Szitka (MSZP)
- 2010-2014: Péter Szitka (MSZP)
- 2014-2019: Péter Szitka (MSZP)
- 2019-2024: Péter Szitka (MSZP)
- 2024-current: Péter Szitka (MSZP)

== Notable people ==
- Béni Egressy composer (born in 1814, as son of the Protestant pastor of the church of Sajókazinc)
- Péter Odrobéna footballer (born in 1985)
- László Kleinheisler (born 8 April 1994) is a Hungarian football midfielder
- Kitti Szász, Hungarian freestyle football world champion

== Twin towns – sister cities ==
Kazincbarcika is twinned with:

- Burgkirchen an der Alz, Germany
- Dimitrovgrad, Bulgaria
- Knurów, Poland
- Revúca, Slovakia
- Sânnicolau Mare, Romania
- Świdnica, Poland
