= Ormosbánya =

- Village
- Flag Coat of arms

- Location of Ormosbánya
- Coordinates: 48.33635°N 20.64843°E
- Country: Hungary
- Region: Northern Hungary
- County: Borsod-Abaúj-Zemplén
- District: Kazincbarcika

Area
  - Total: 7.55 km^{2} (2.92 sq mi)

Population (1 January 2025)
  - Total: 1,463
  - Density: 194/km^{2} (502/sq mi)
- Time zone: UTC+1 (CET)
  - Summer (DST): UTC+2 (CEST)
- Postal code: 3743
- Area code: (+36) 48
- Website: www.ormosbanya.hu

Ormosbánya is a village in Borsod-Abaúj-Zemplén County in northeastern Hungary.
