= Sajókaza =

- Village
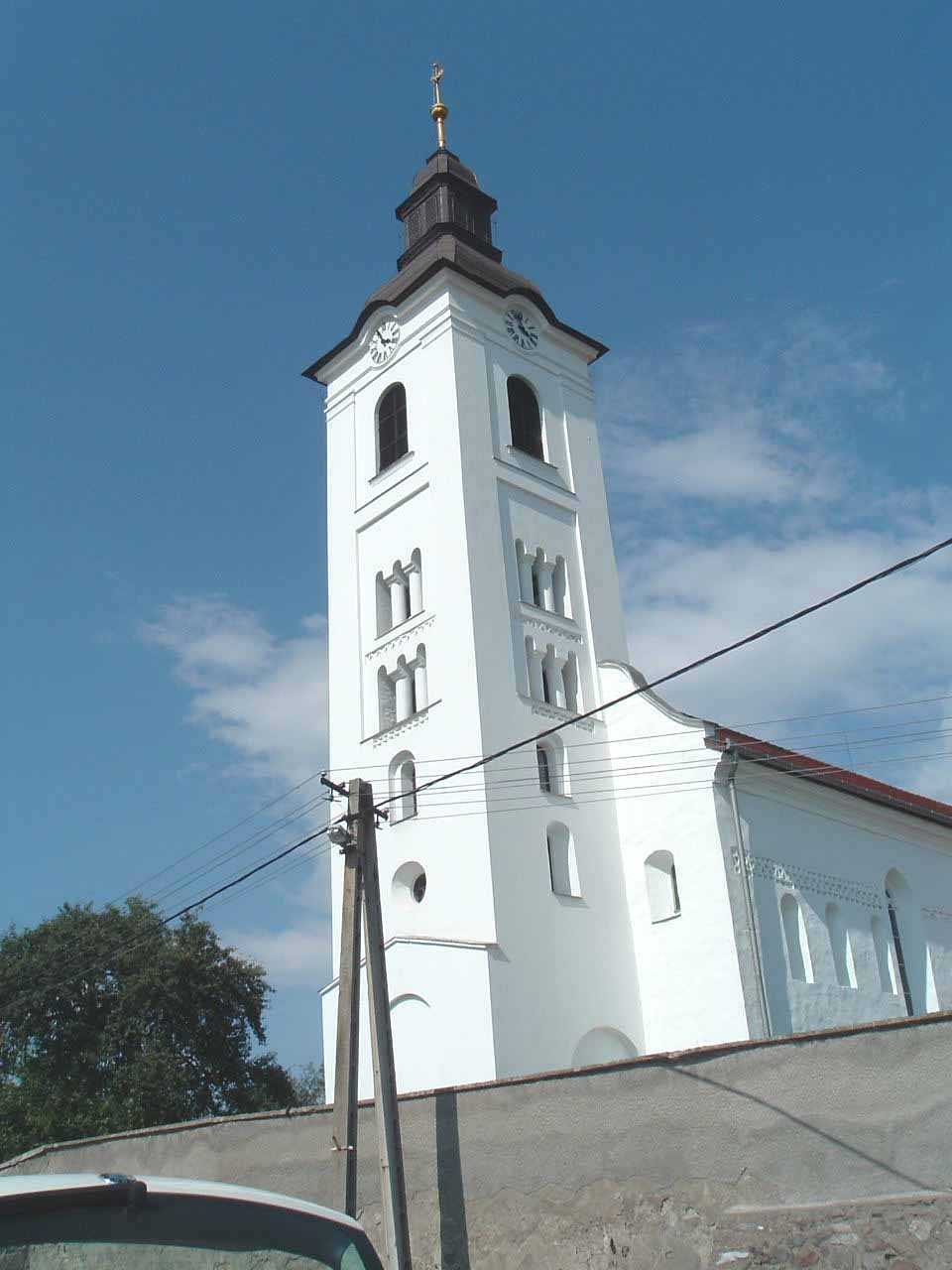

- Flag Coat of arms

- Location of Sajókaza
- Coordinates: 48.28335°N 20.582761°E
- Country: Hungary
- Region: Northern Hungary
- County: Borsod-Abaúj-Zemplén
- District: Kazincbarcika

Area
  - Total: 30.71 km^{2} (11.86 sq mi)

Population (1 January 2025)
  - Total: 2,955
  - Density: 96.22/km^{2} (249.2/sq mi)
- Time zone: UTC+1 (CET)
  - Summer (DST): UTC+2 (CEST)
- Postal code: 3720
- Area code: (+36) 48
- Website: www.sajokaza.hu

Sajókaza is a village in Borsod-Abaúj-Zemplén County in northeastern Hungary.
