= Bánhorváti =

- Village
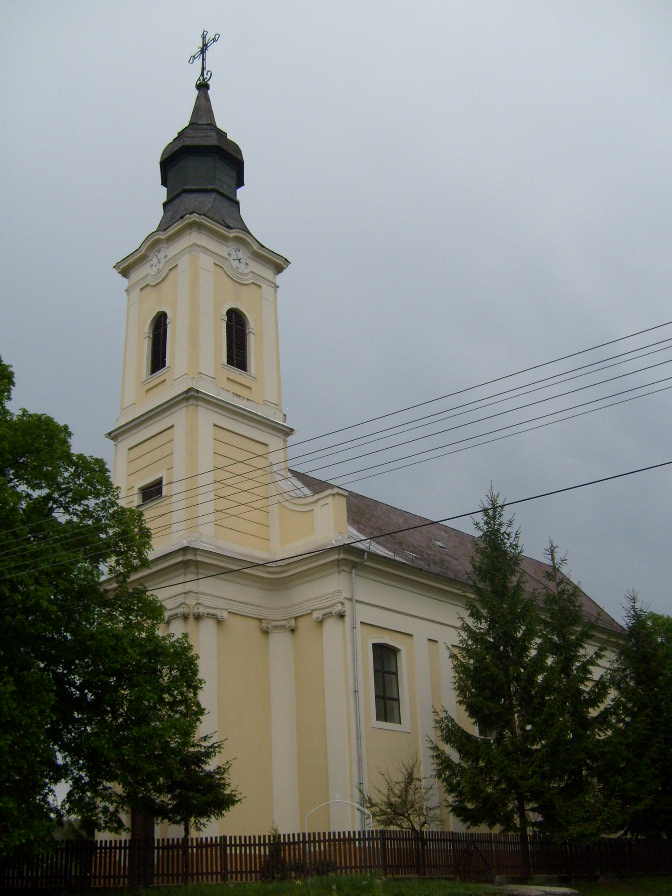

- Flag Coat of arms

- Location of Bánhorváti
- Coordinates: 48.22525°N 20.50441°E
- Country: Hungary
- Region: Northern Hungary
- County: Borsod-Abaúj-Zemplén
- District: Kazincbarcika

Area
  - Total: 28.47 km^{2} (10.99 sq mi)

Population (1 January 2026)
  - Total: 1,233
  - Density: 43.31/km^{2} (112.2/sq mi)
- Time zone: UTC+1 (CET)
  - Summer (DST): UTC+2 (CEST)
- Postal code: 3642
- Area code: (+36) 48
- Website: www.banhorvati.hu

Bánhorváti is a village in Borsod-Abaúj-Zemplén county, Hungary. It appeared after Bánfalva and Bánhorvát merged in 1950.

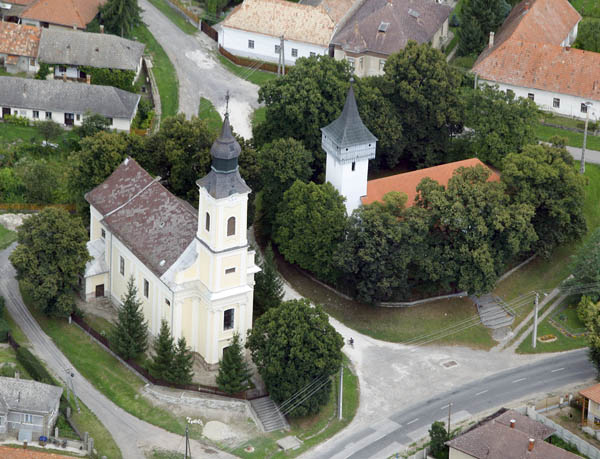

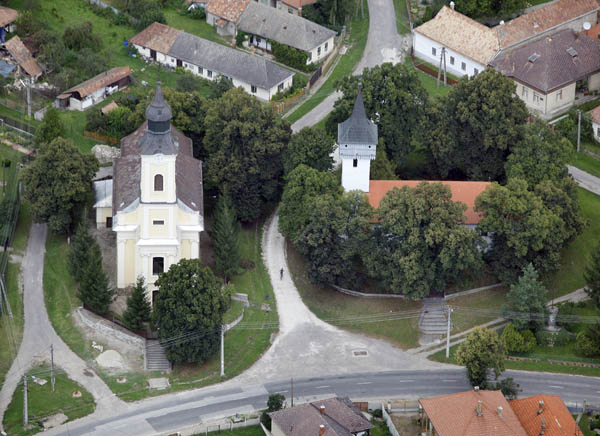

In the 19th and 20th centuries, a small Jewish community lived in the village, in 1910 56 Jews lived in the village, most of whom were murdered in the Holocaust. The community had a Jewish cemetery.
