= Ragály =

- Village
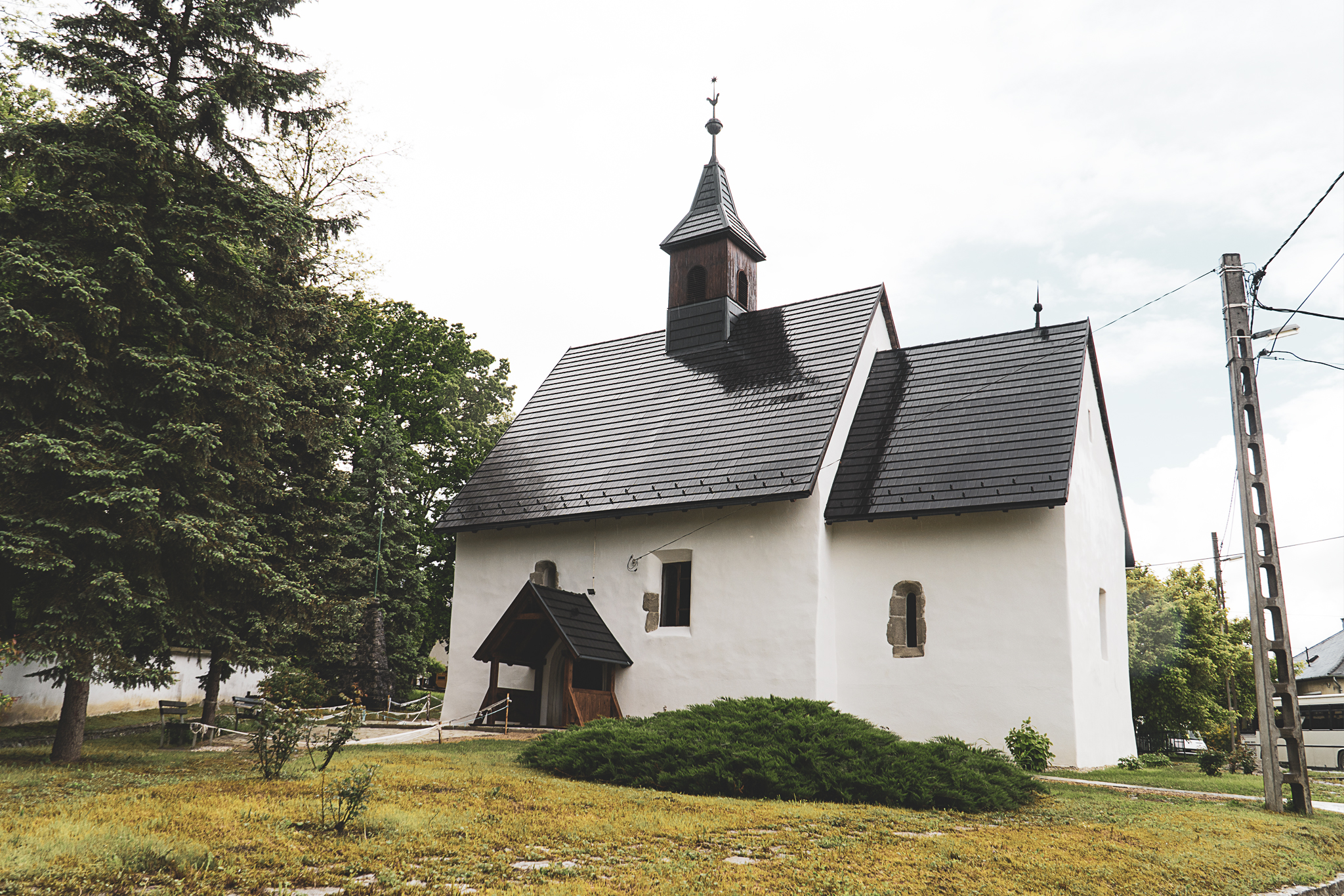

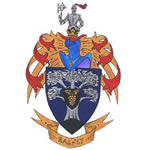
- Seal

- Location within Hungary
- Coordinates: 48°24′N 20°31′E
- Country: Hungary
- Regions: Northern Hungary
- County: Borsod-Abaúj-Zemplén County
- Time zone: UTC+1 (CET)
  - Summer (DST): UTC+2 (CEST)

Ragály is a village in Borsod-Abaúj-Zemplén County in northeastern Hungary. Name of the village has probably Slavic origin.

== Reformed Church ==
Gothic church belonging to the Reformed Church from 12.-13. century is standing in the village. It contains medieval frescoes and it was restored few years ago.

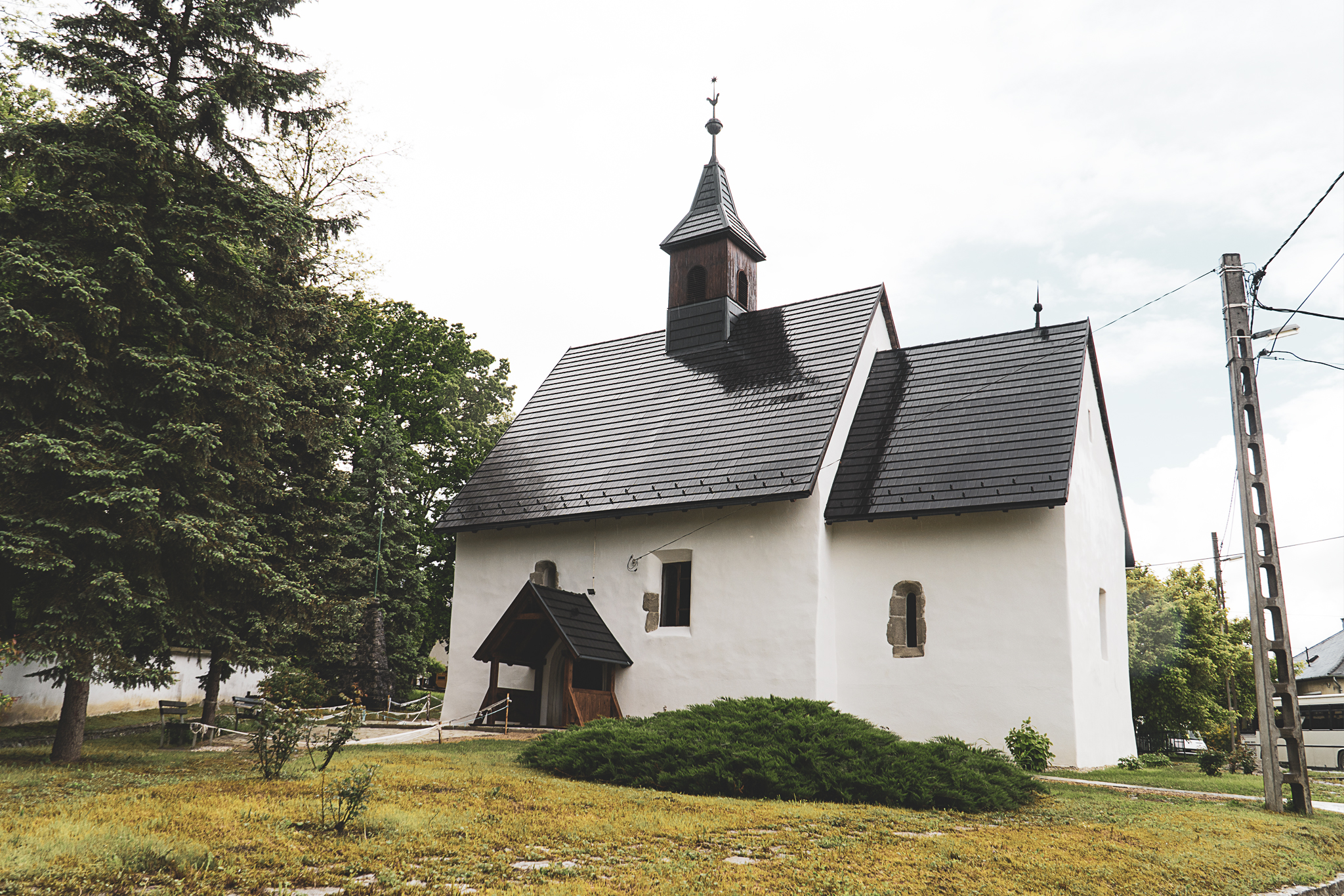

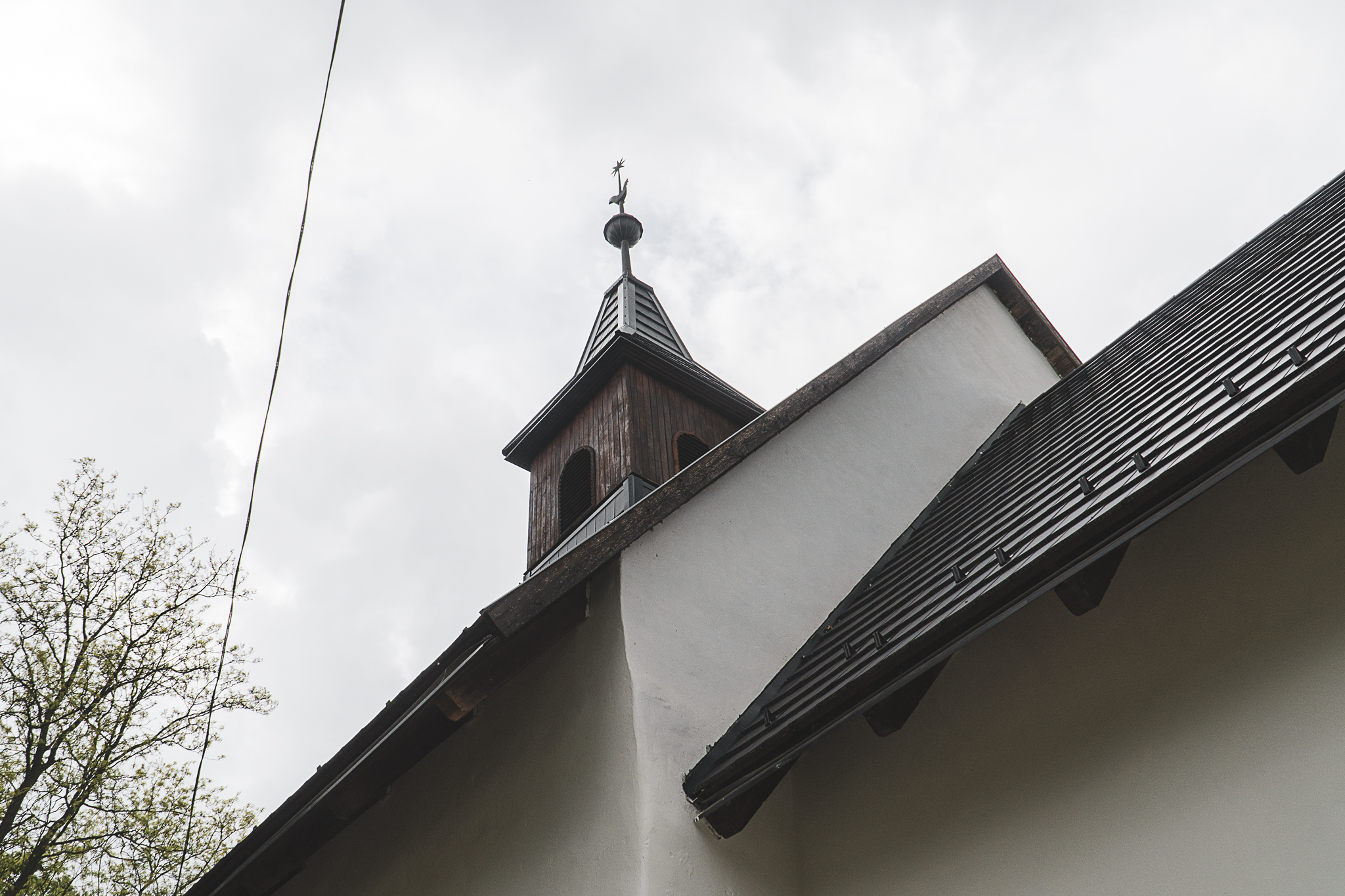

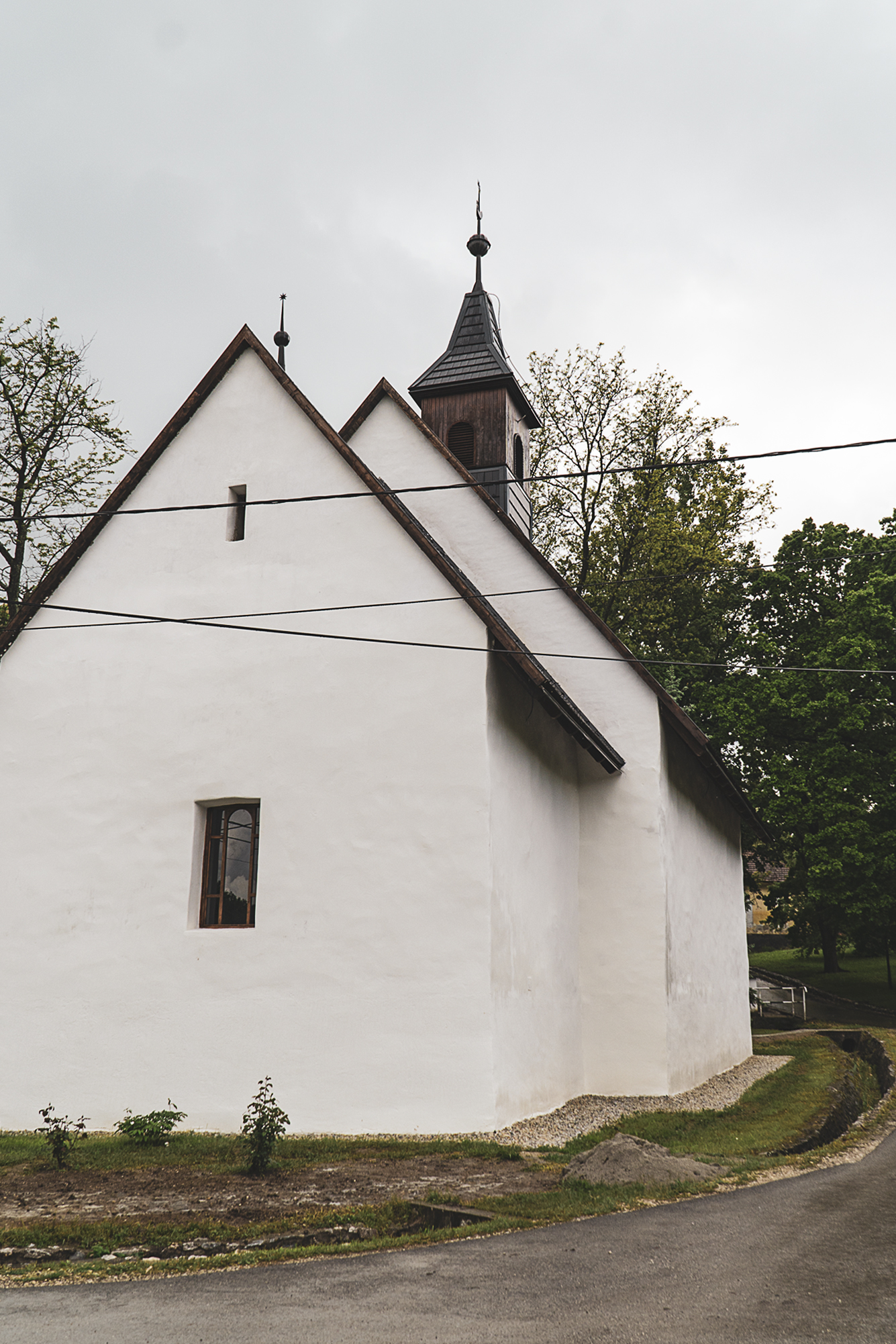

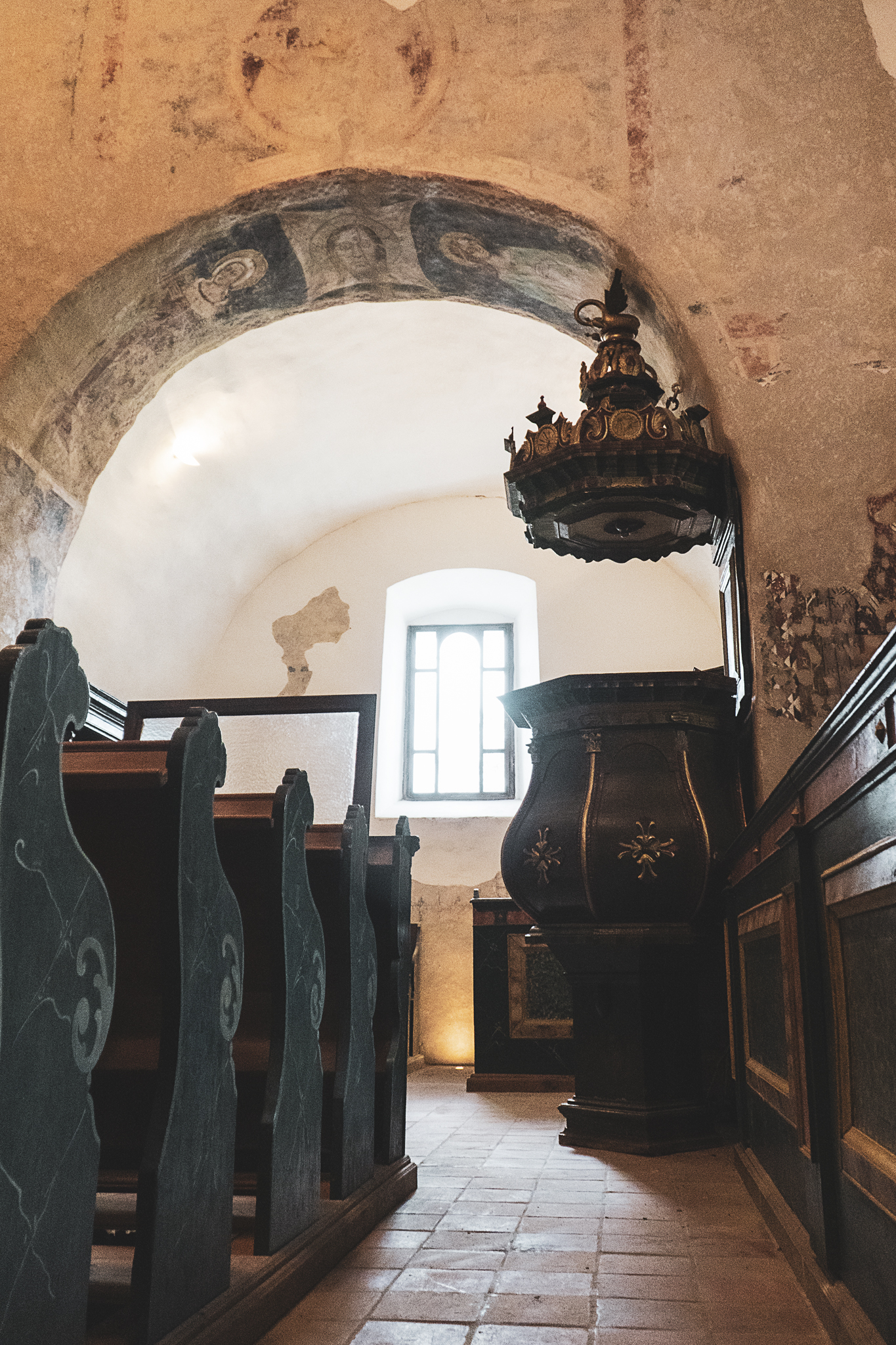

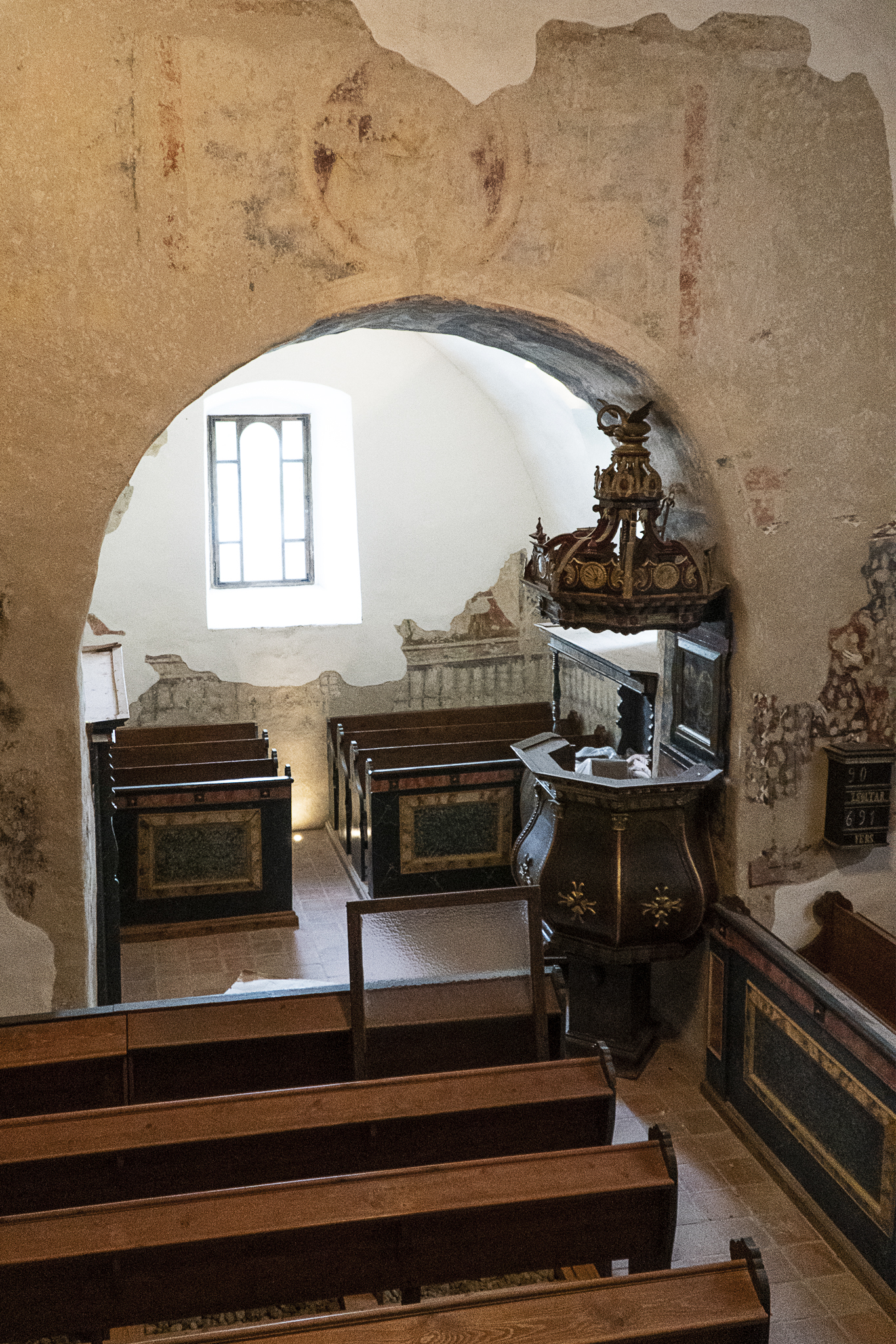

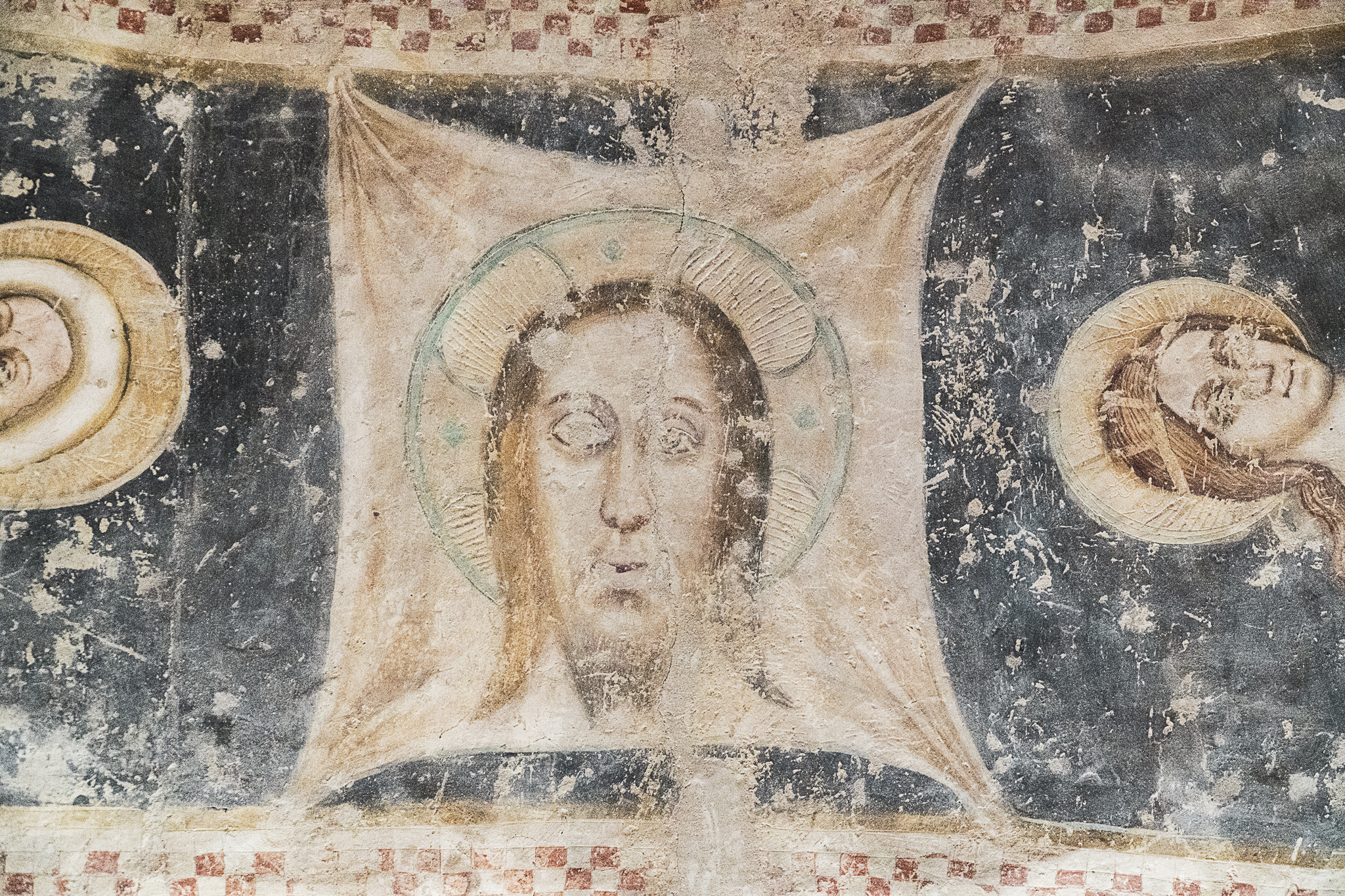

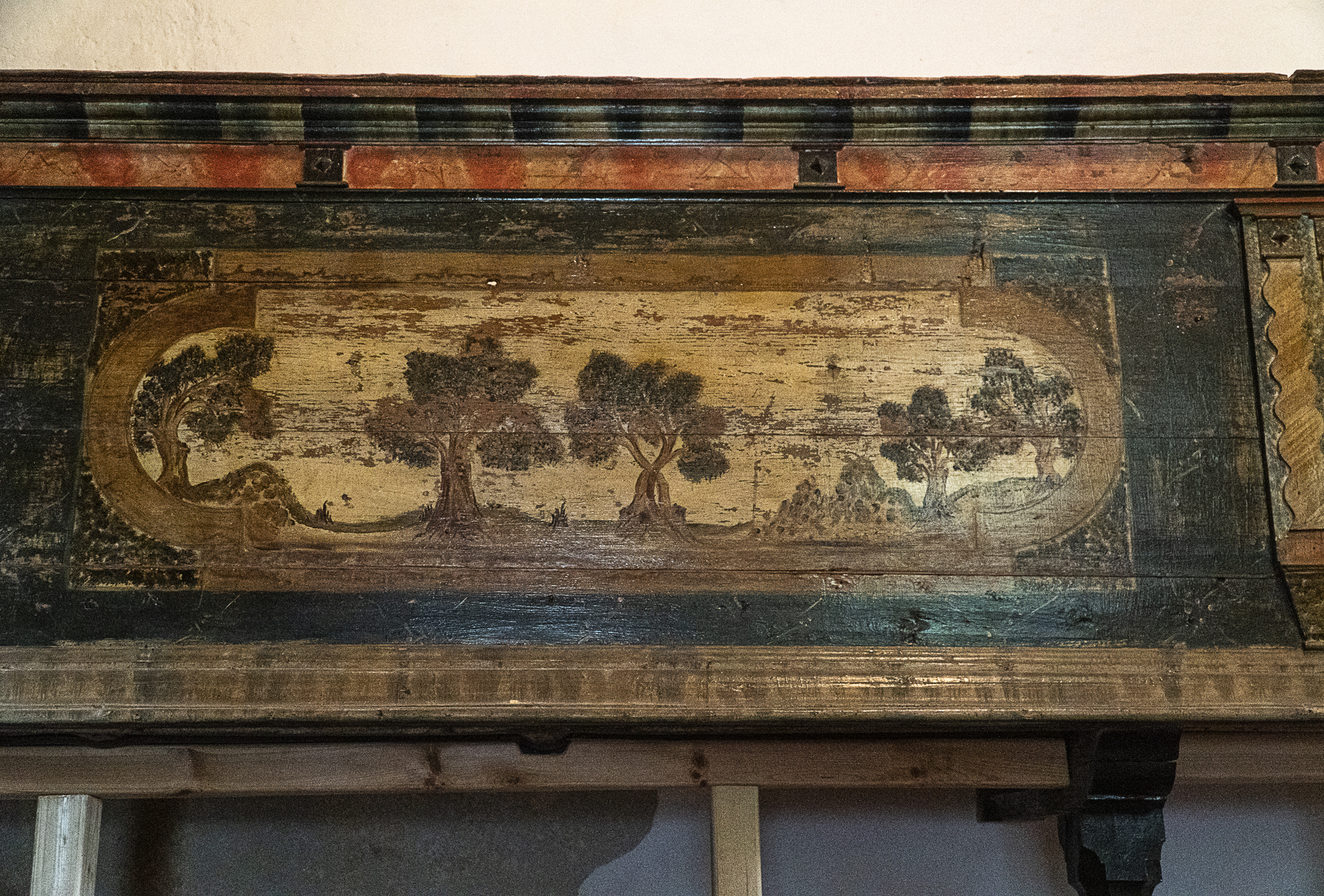
