= Nagybarca =

- Village
- Flag Coat of arms

- Location of Nagybarca
- Coordinates: 48.24498°N 20.52488°E
- Country: Hungary
- Region: Northern Hungary
- County: Borsod-Abaúj-Zemplén
- District: Kazincbarcika

Area
  - Total: 14.39 km^{2} (5.56 sq mi)

Population (1 January 2025)
  - Total: 881
  - Density: 61.2/km^{2} (159/sq mi)
- Time zone: UTC+1 (CET)
  - Summer (DST): UTC+2 (CEST)
- Postal code: 3641
- Area code: (+36) 48
- Website: www.nagybarca.hu

Nagybarca is a village in Borsod-Abaúj-Zemplén county, Hungary.
