= Berente =

- Village
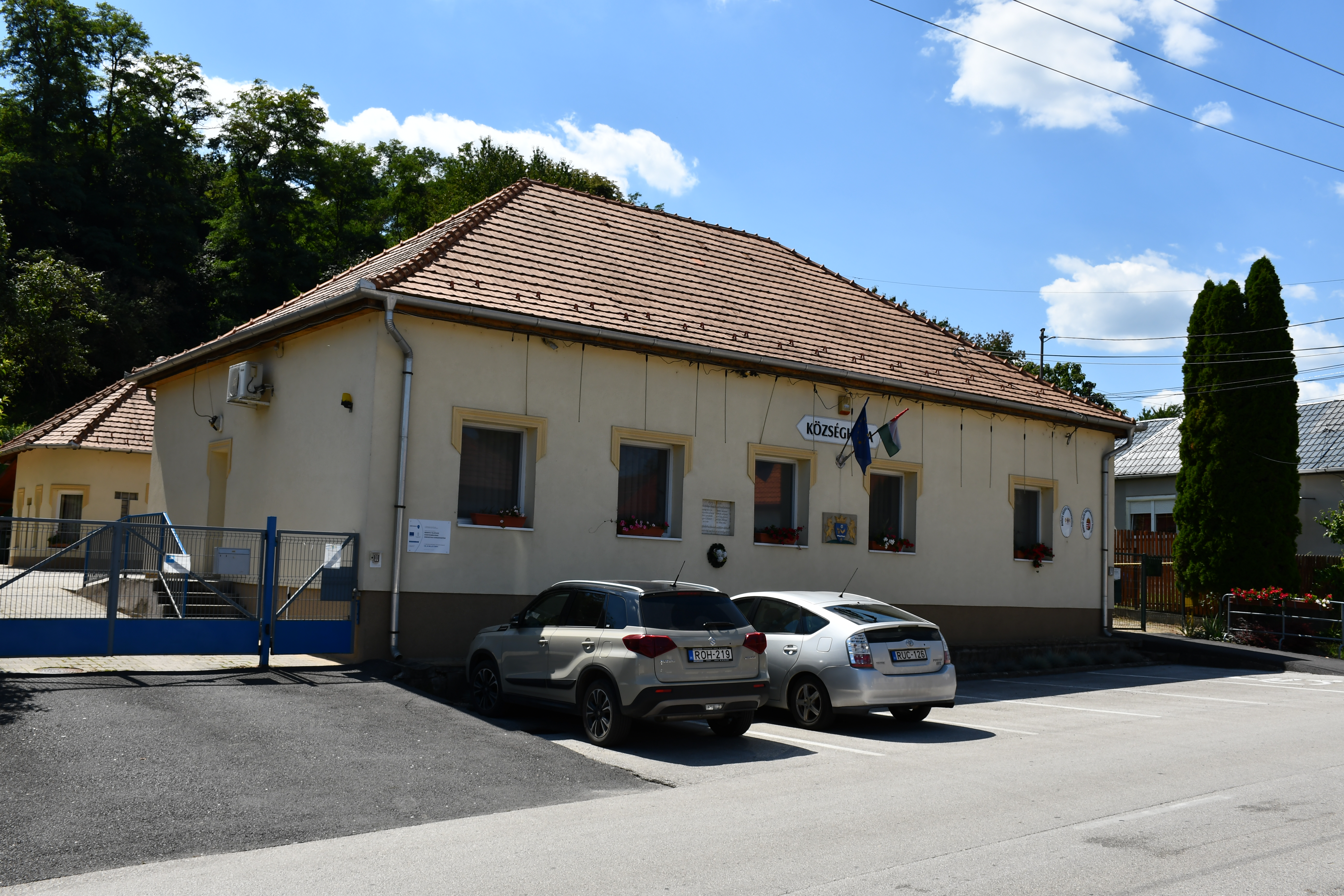
- Town hall

- Flag Coat of arms

- Location of Berente
- Coordinates: 48.24421°N 20.66331°E
- Country: Hungary
- Region: Northern Hungary
- County: Borsod-Abaúj-Zemplén
- District: Kazincbarcika

Area
  - Total: 9.2 km^{2} (3.6 sq mi)

Population (1 January 2025)
  - Total: 1,017
  - Density: 110/km^{2} (290/sq mi)
- Time zone: UTC+1 (CET)
  - Summer (DST): UTC+2 (CEST)
- Postal code: 3704
- Area code: (+36) 48
- Website: www.berente.hu

Berente is a village in Borsod-Abaúj-Zemplén county, Hungary.
