= Izsófalva =

- Large village
- Flag Coat of arms

- Location within Hungary
- Coordinates: 48°18′N 20°40′E
- Country: Hungary
- County: Borsod-Abaúj-Zemplén
- District: Kazincbarcika
- Time zone: UTC+1 (CET)
  - Summer (DST): UTC+2 (CEST)
- Postal code: 3741
- Area code: (+36) 48

Izsófalva (formerly Disznóshorvát) is a village in Borsod-Abaúj-Zemplén County in northeastern Hungary. The village has a population of 1,871.

== Notable people ==
- Gábor Szeremlei (1807–1867), Hungarian Protestant theologian and professor
