= Tardona =

- Village
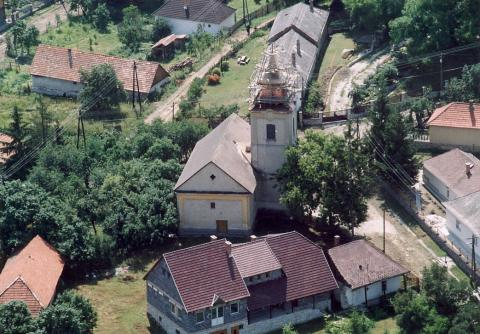
- Aerial photograph of Tardona (Reformed Church)

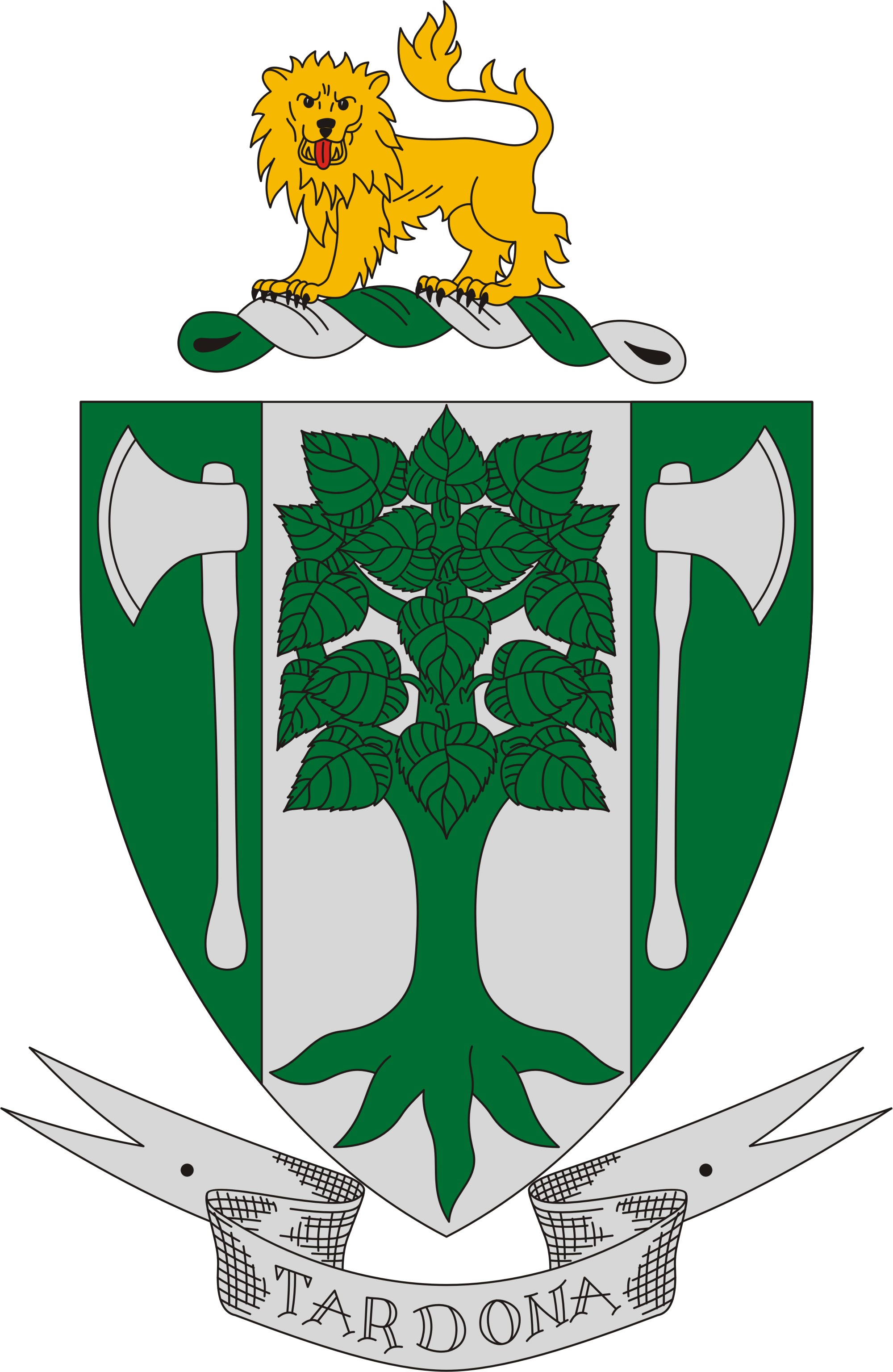
- Coat of arms

- Location of Tardona in Hungary
- Coordinates: 48.1718°N 20.5339°E
- Country: Hungary
- Region: Northern Hungary
- County: Borsod-Abaúj-Zemplén

Government
  - Mayor: Balla György (Fidesz)

Area
  - Total: 12.29 km^{2} (4.75 sq mi)

Population (1 January 2016)
  - Total: 1,013
  - Density: 82.42/km^{2} (213.5/sq mi)
- Time zone: UTC+1 (CET)
  - Summer (DST): UTC+2 (CEST)
- Postal code: 3644
- Area code: +36 48
- Website: http://tardona.hu/

Tardona is a village in Borsod-Abaúj-Zemplén county, Northern Hungary, about 20 kilometres (12 miles) from the county capital Miskolc.

== History ==
Tardona was first mentioned in written documents in 1240 as Turduna, it was most likely a village of Castle Dédes. During the 14th century, the settlement along with Castle Dédes got into the hands of the Palóczi Family.

== Reformed Church of Tardona ==
The Reformed Church of Tardona was built between 1786 and 1788 with the tower being finished later in 1811. On 19 October 1875, the original Church has burned down along with all the other buildings of the Church. Most of the important documents about the settlement were kept in the church this event lead to the lack of information about the settlements past. The church was later rebuilt, and in 1924, its tower was rebuilt to be the today known 24meters tall.

=== The bells of Tardona ===
The larger bell was made by Ráfael Szlezák in 1954. It weighs 206 kg and is 78 cm in diameter. The following is engraved on it:

„A bűnösöket hívogatom a megtérésre. Luk. 5:32. Jöjjetek el, örvendezzünk az Úrnak. Istennek ezzel az igéjével hívogatta 77 éven keresztül a híveket az a harang, amelynek anyagából ezt újraöntette a tardonai ref. egyház az 1954. évben.”

Which translates to:

"I am calling for the sinners to repent their sins. Luk. 5:32. Come, Rejoice in God. With these words of God the bell called to the faithful for 77 years, and from that bell was the bell of tardona made by the Reformed Church in 1954."

The second bell is a smaller one weighing in at 78 kg (54 cm in diameter). It was made by László Szlezák in Budapest.

== Memorial room of Mór Jókai ==
A frequently visited tourist destination is the memorial room of Mór Jókai memorating the time when Mór Jókai was hiding in Tardona during after 1849. The house housing the room was built during the beginning of the 20th century. It is situated across the Reformed Church near the centre of the village. In the room, there are many souvenirs from the period, such as handwritings, books, room furniture and even a safe, which was used by the judge of the village.

== Mentions of Tardona in Hungarian literature ==
- Mór Jókai: A tengerszemű hölgy (Eyes like the Sea)
- Mór Jókai: A barátfalvi lévita
- Béni Balogh: Tardonai papírmalom
- Erzsébet Kertész: A három Róza
- István Jávori: Hármas-forrás

== See also ==
- Miskolc
