= Kurityán =

- Location of Borsod-Abaúj-Zemplén county in Hungary

- Location of Kurityán
- Coordinates: 48.31310°N 20.62384°E
- Country: Hungary
- County: Borsod-Abaúj-Zemplén

Area
  - Total: 7.54 km^{2} (2.91 sq mi)

Population (2004)
  - Total: 1,792
  - Density: 237.66/km^{2} (615.5/sq mi)
- Time zone: UTC+1 (CET)
  - Summer (DST): UTC+2 (CEST)
- Postal code: 3732
- Area code: 48

Kurityán is a village in Borsod-Abaúj-Zemplén county, Hungary.

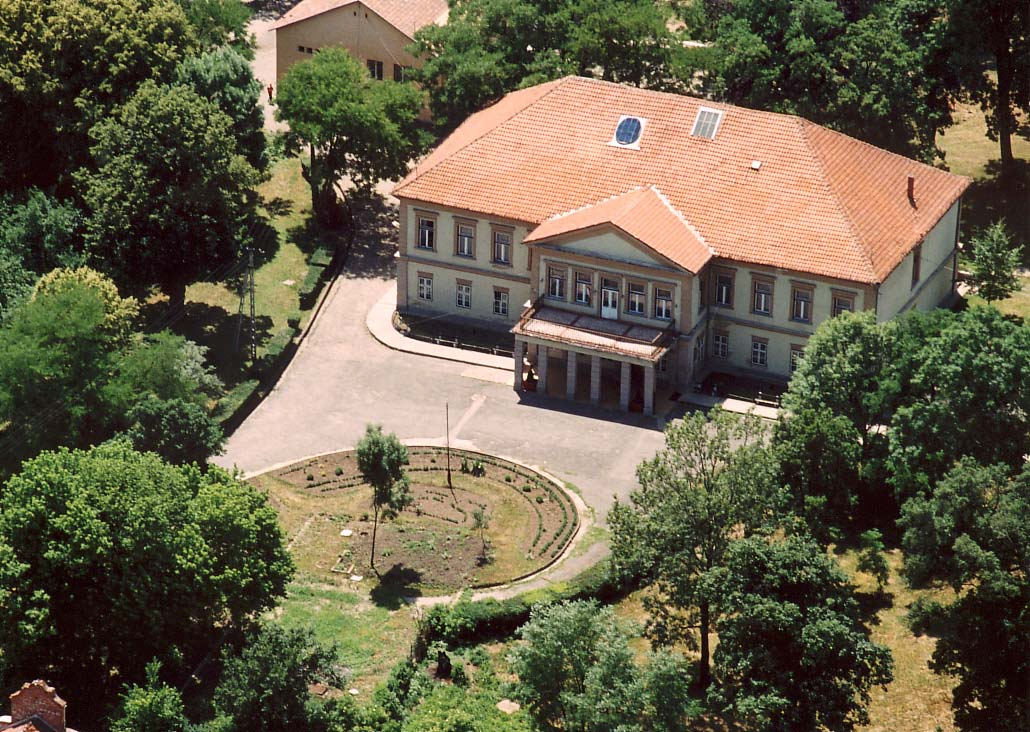
Aerial photography: Kurityán, palace

== Etymology ==
The name comes from the Slavic/Early Slovak koryto (manger) with the suffix -ťany used to derive place names referring to people. Initially the name of the valley. 1280/1413 Koryth.
