= Dédestapolcsány =

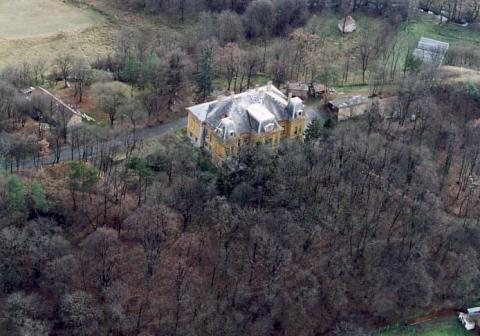
- Aerial photograph of Dédestapolcsány

- Location of Borsod-Abaúj-Zemplén county in Hungary

- Location of Dédestapolcsány
- Coordinates: 48.18026°N 20.48348°E
- Country: Hungary
- County: Borsod-Abaúj-Zemplén

Area
  - Total: 29.45 km^{2} (11.37 sq mi)

Population (2004)
  - Total: 1,603
  - Density: 54.43/km^{2} (141.0/sq mi)
- Time zone: UTC+1 (CET)
  - Summer (DST): UTC+2 (CEST)
- Postal code: 3643
- Area code: 48
- Website: www.dedestapolcsany.hu

Dédestapolcsány is a village in Borsod-Abaúj-Zemplén county, Hungary.

== Etymology ==
Dédes comes from a Slavic personal name Deduš derived from dědъ. Dedus (1240).

Tapolcsány comes from Slovak/Slavic Topoľčany (Slovak: topoľ - poplar tree, see also Topoľčany) or Tepličany (hot spring or stream, see also Tepličany, now a part of Družstevná pri Hornáde). Tapolchan (1438).
