= Szécsény District =

Coordinates: 48.0667°N 19.5667°E

Szécsény District Szécsényi járás
- Districts of Hungary
- Coat of arms

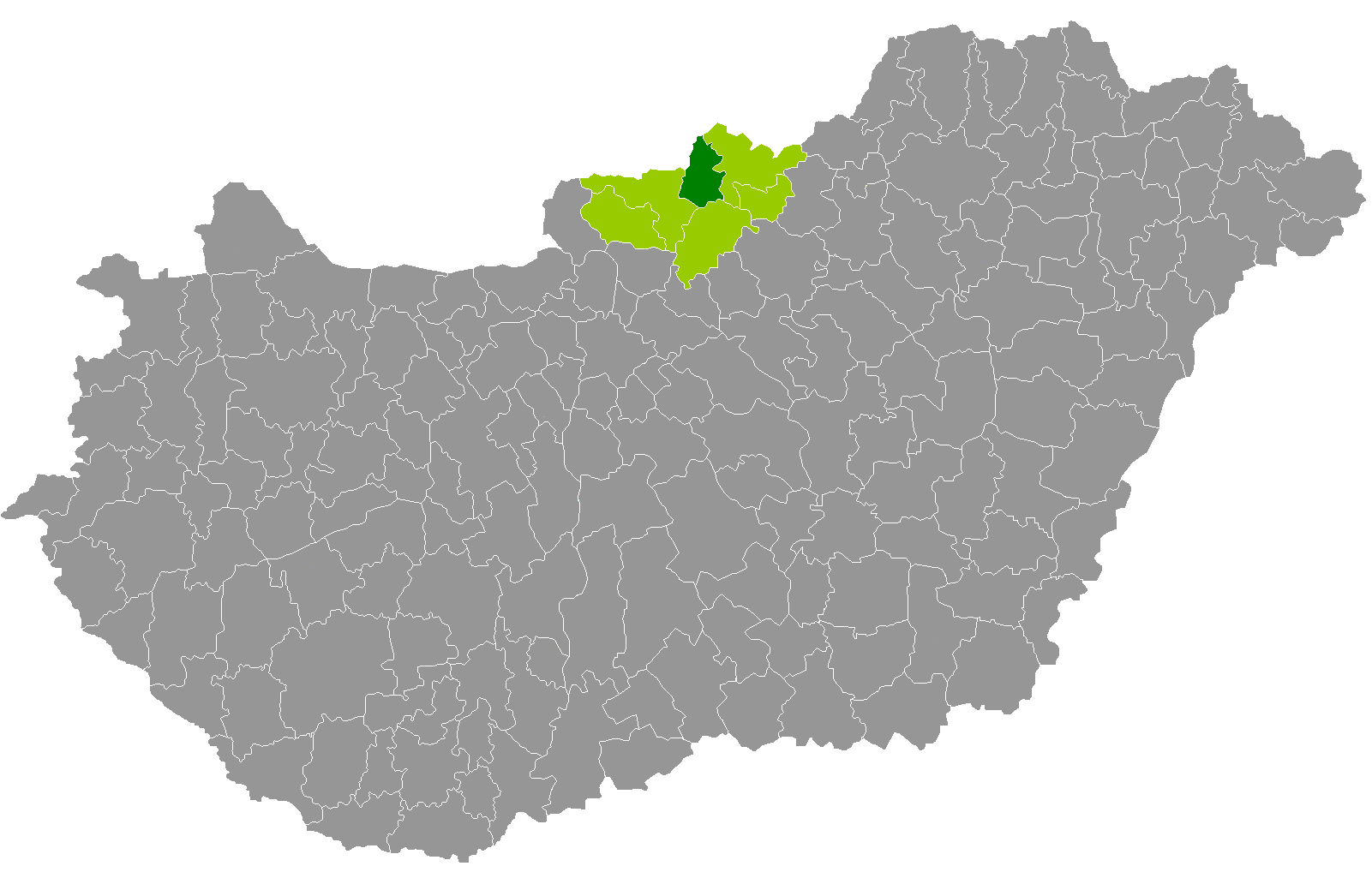
- Szécsény District within Hungary and Nógrád County.
- Country: Hungary
- County: Nógrád
- District seat: Szécsény

Area
  - Total: 285.26 km^{2} (110.14 sq mi)
  - Rank: 5th in Nógrád

Population (2011 census)
  - Total: 19,587
  - Rank: 6th in Nógrád
  - Density: 69/km^{2} (180/sq mi)

Szécsény (Hungarian: Szécsényi járás) is a district in northern part of Nógrád County. Szécsény is also the town where the district seat is found. The district is located in the Northern Hungary statistical region.

== Geography ==
Szécsény District borders with the Slovak Banská Bystrica Region to the north and west, Salgótarján District to the northeast, Pásztó District to the south, Balassagyarmat District to the southwest. The number of the inhabited places in Szécsény District is 14.

== Municipalities ==
The district has one town (bolded) and 13 villages. (ordered by population, as of 1 January 2013)

- Endrefalva (1,238)
- Hollókő (329)
- Ludányhalászi (1,496)
- Magyargéc (899)
- Nagylóc (1,591)
- Nógrádmegyer (1,716)
- Nógrádsipek (698)
- Nógrádszakál (636)
- Piliny (589)
- Rimóc (1,841)
- Szalmatercs (441)
- **Szécsény** (5,999) – district seat
- Szécsényfelfalu (418)
- Varsány (1,646)

== Demographics ==
Religion in Szécsény District (2011 census)
1. Catholic Church (72.2%)
2. Lutheranism (0.90%)
3. Calvinism (0.80%)
4. Other religions (1.70%)
5. Non-religious (5.30%)
6. Atheists (0.30%)
7. Undeclared (18.8%)

In 2011, it had a population of 19,587 and the population density was 69/km^{2}.

Year	County population	Change
2011	19,587	n/a

=== Ethnicity ===
Besides the Hungarian majority, the main minority is the Roma (approx. 3,000).

Total population (2011 census): 19,587
Ethnic groups (2011 census): Identified themselves: 20,415 persons:

- Hungarians: 17,548 (85.96%)
- Gypsies: 2,686 (13.16%)
- Others and indefinable: 181 (0.89%)

Approx. 1,000 persons in Szécsény District did declare more than one ethnic group at the 2011 census.

=== Religion ===
Religious adherence in the county according to 2011 census:

- Catholic – 14,152 (Roman Catholic – 14,134; Greek Catholic – 17);
- Evangelical – 163;
- Reformed – 146;
- other religions – 339;
- Non-religious – 1,044;
- Atheism – 56;
- Undeclared – 3,687.

== Gallery ==
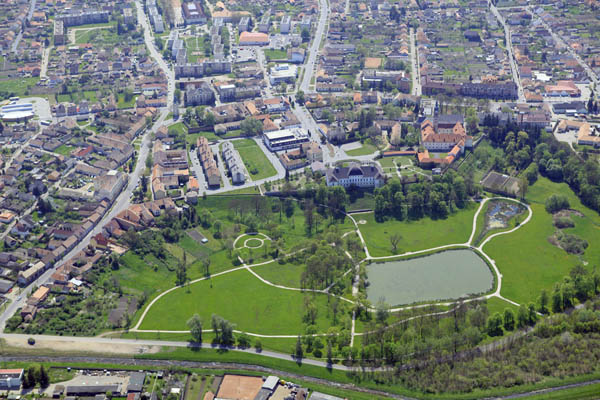
Szécsény, the district seat

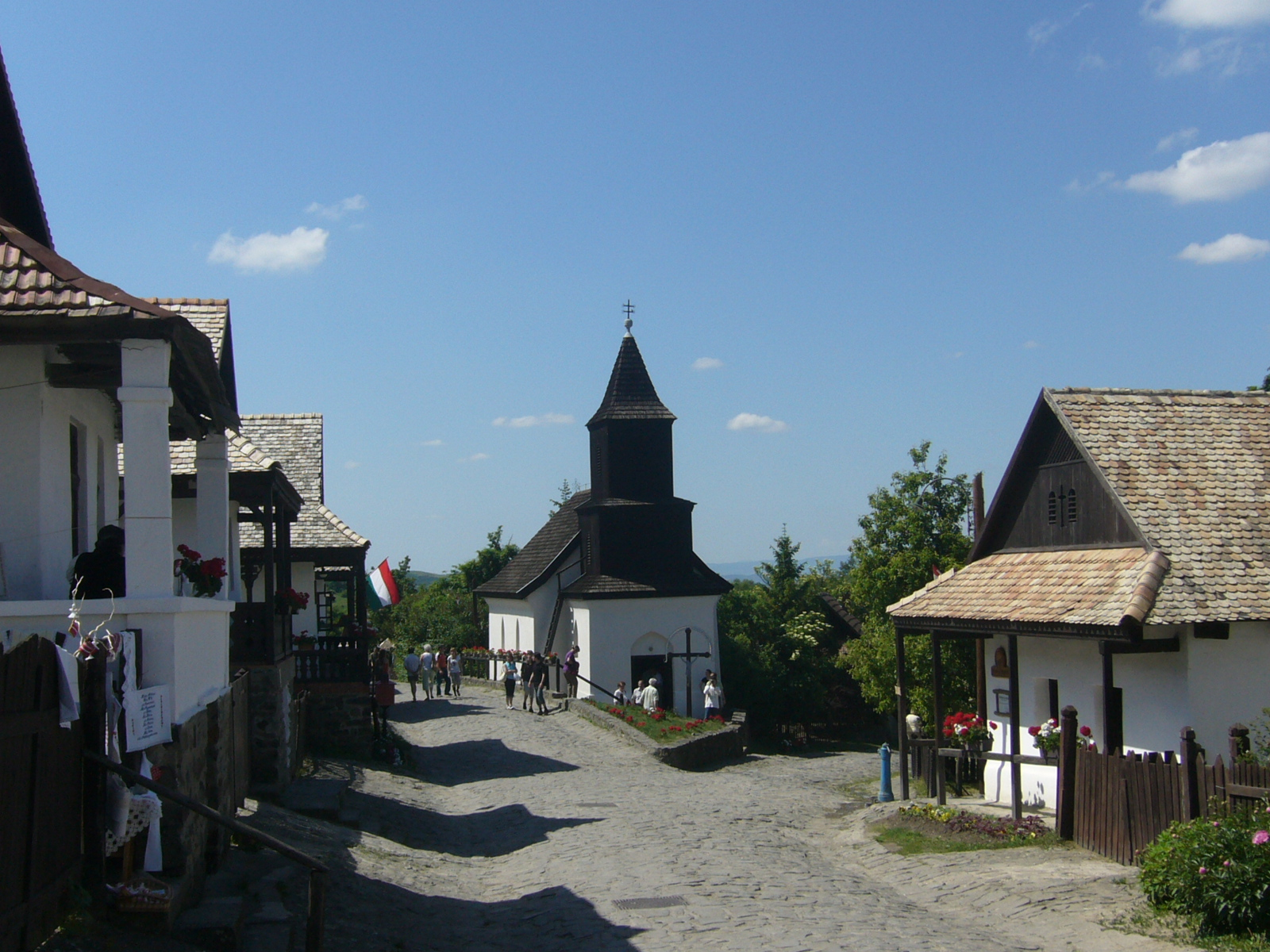
View of Hollókő

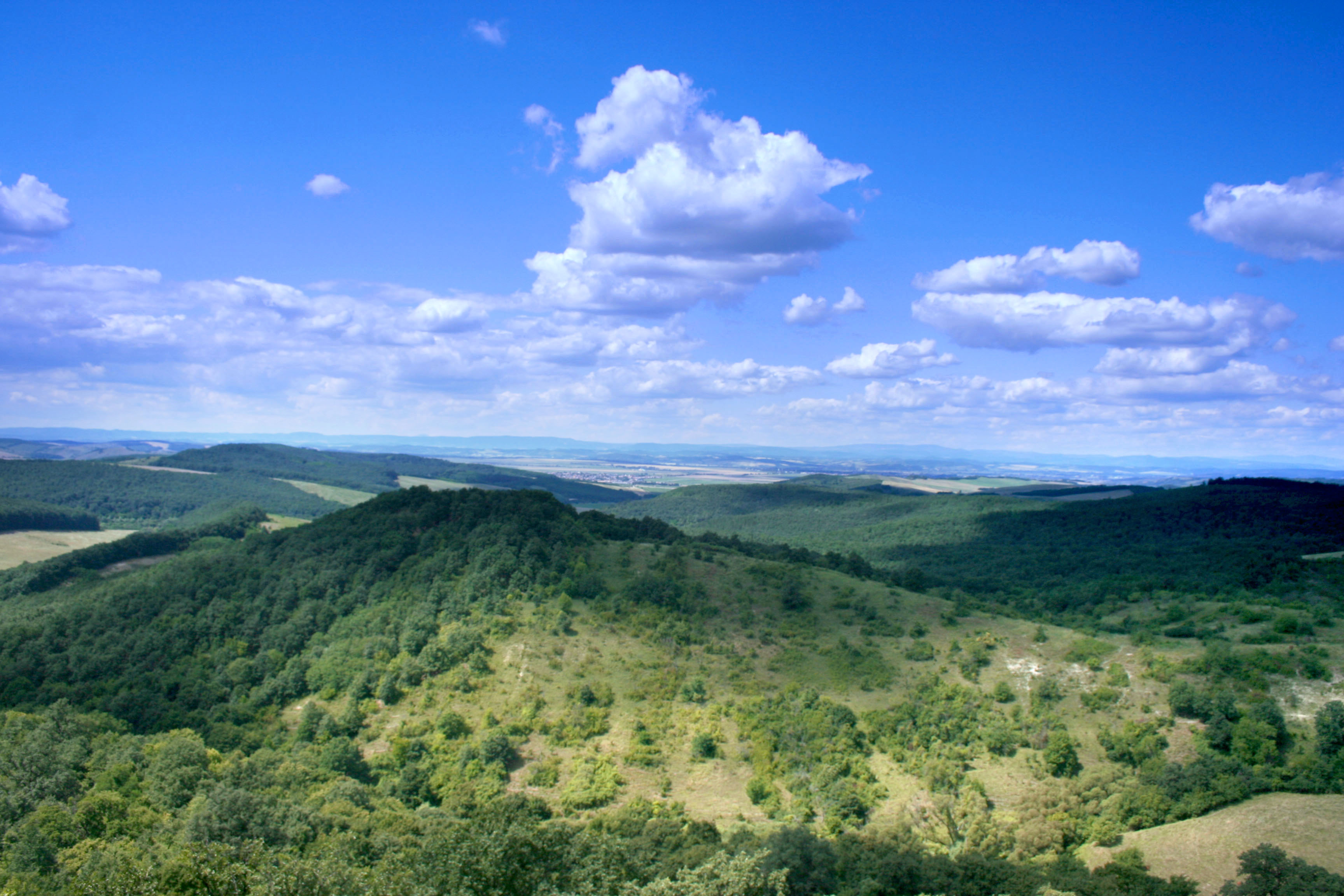
Cserhát mountains from Hollókő Castle

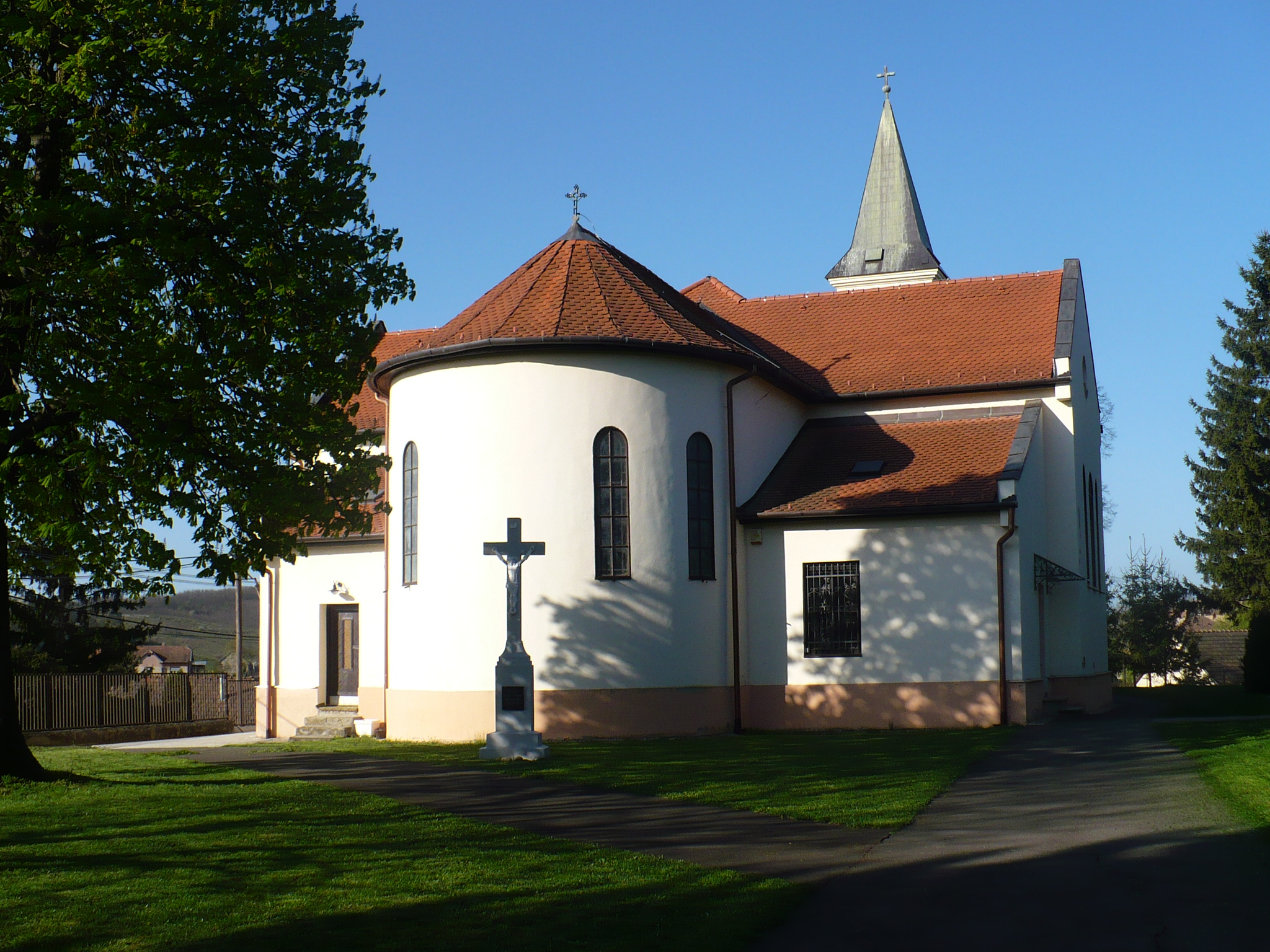
St. Michael Church in Varsány

== See also ==
- List of cities and towns of Hungary
