= Szente =

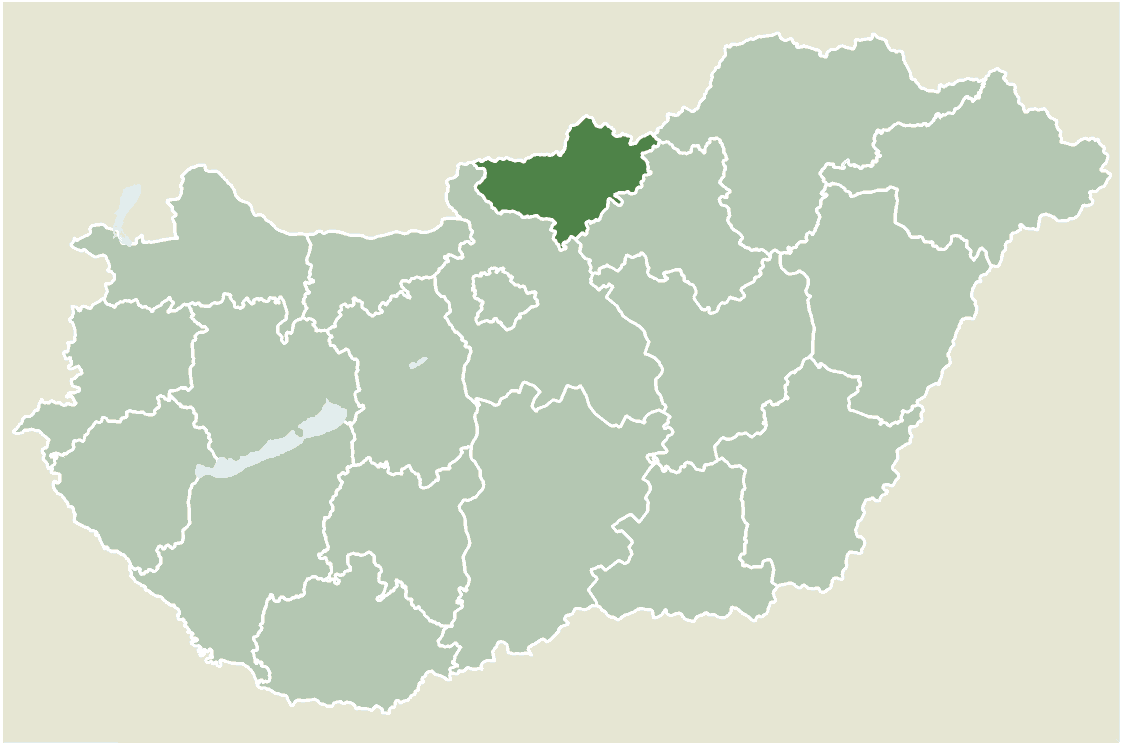
- Location of Nógrád county in Hungary

- Location of Szente
- Coordinates: 47.96757°N 19.28327°E
- Country: Hungary
- County: Nógrád

Area
  - Total: 7.53 km^{2} (2.91 sq mi)

Population (2004)
  - Total: 365
  - Density: 48.47/km^{2} (125.5/sq mi)
- Time zone: UTC+1 (CET)
  - Summer (DST): UTC+2 (CEST)
- Postal code: 2655
- Area code: 35

Szente is a village in Nógrád county, Hungary. It is located in the Cserhát range below the 348 m high Cserhát peak.
