= Bér =

Village and municipality in Nógrád, Hungary

Coordinates: 47°52′N 19°30′E

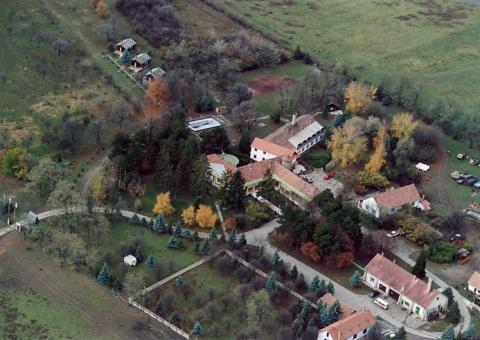
Bér

Bér is a village and municipality in the comitat of Nógrád, Hungary. The village is the part of the Novohrad-Nógrád Geopark.

Population by year
Year	Population
1870	917
1880	799
1890	866
1900	893
1910	944
1920	983
1930	988
1941	996
1949	1001
1960	921
1970	837
1980	643
1990	550
2001	453
2011	371

== Links ==
- Novohrad-Nógrád UNESCO Global Geopark
