= Karancskeszi =

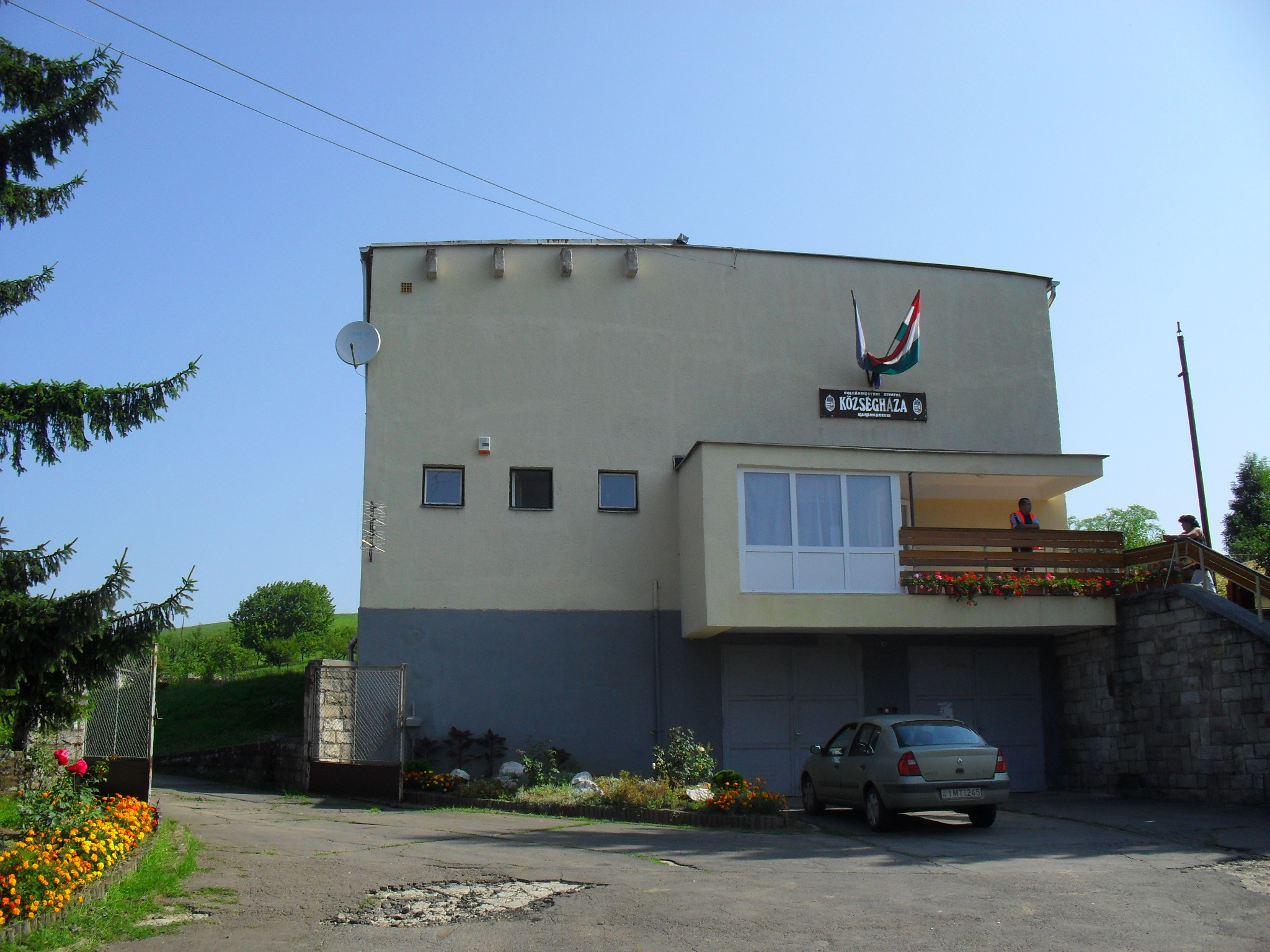
- Village hall

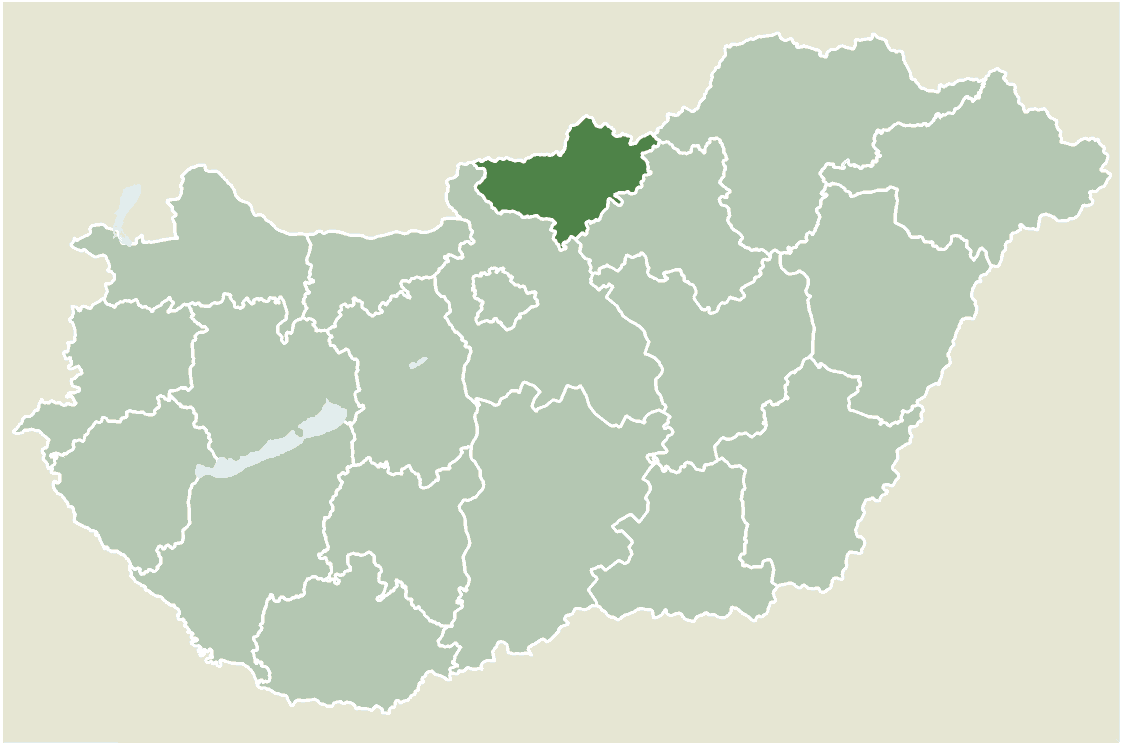
- Location of Nógrád county in Hungary

- Location of Karancskeszi
- Coordinates: 48.16329°N 19.69961°E
- Country: Hungary
- County: Nógrád

Area
  - Total: 31.69 km^{2} (12.24 sq mi)

Population (2004)
  - Total: 1,935
  - Density: 61.06/km^{2} (158.1/sq mi)
- Time zone: UTC+1 (CET)
  - Summer (DST): UTC+2 (CEST)
- Postal code: 3183
- Area code: 32

Karancskeszi is a village in Nógrád county, Hungary.
