= Kishartyán =

Village in Nógrád County, Hungary

Coordinates: 48°5′N 19°42′E

Kishartyán is a village in Nógrád County, Hungary with 496 inhabitants as of 2025.
