= Ősagárd =

Village in Nógrád County, Hungary

- Village
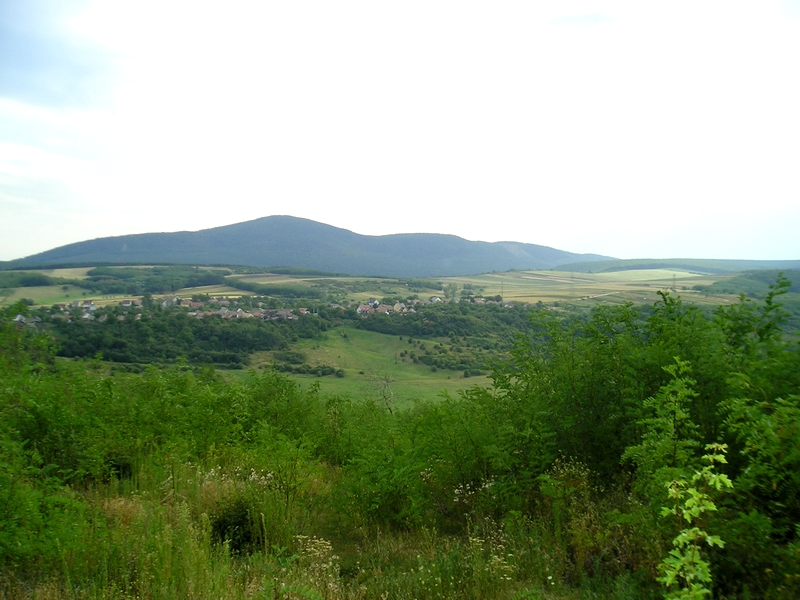

- Coat of arms

- Location within Nógrád County Location within Hungary
- Coordinates: 47°51′36″N 19°11′26″E

Government
  - Mayor: Agárdi András (independent)

Area
  - Total: 10.92 km^{2} (4.22 sq mi)

Population
  - Total: 295
  - Density: 27.0/km^{2} (70.0/sq mi)
- Time zone: CET
  - Summer (DST): CEST
- Postal code: 2610

Ősagárd (Slovak: Agárd) is a village and commune in Nógrád County, Hungary with 296 inhabitants (2015).

In 2022, 91.9% of the population identified themselves as Hungarian, 31.2% as Slovak, 0.7% as German, 0.3% as Roma, 1.7% as other non-domestic nationality.

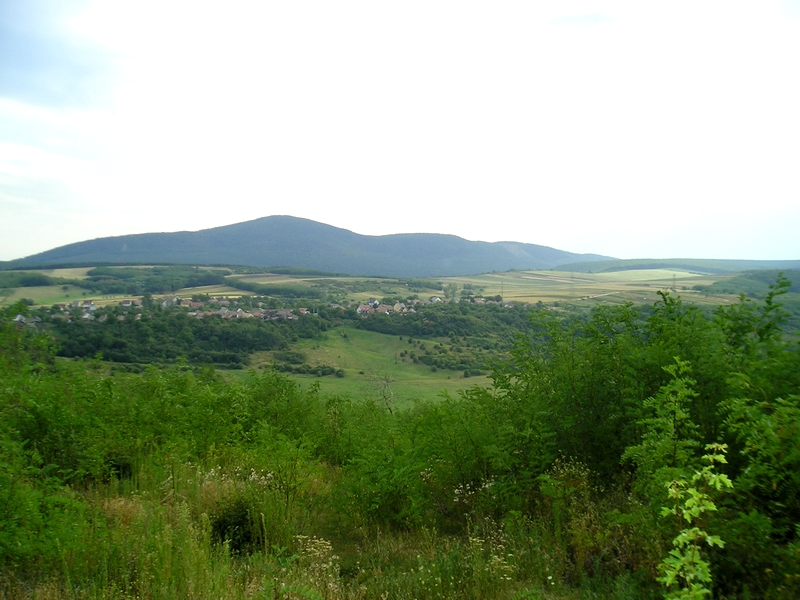
