= Lucfalva =

Lucfalva Lucina
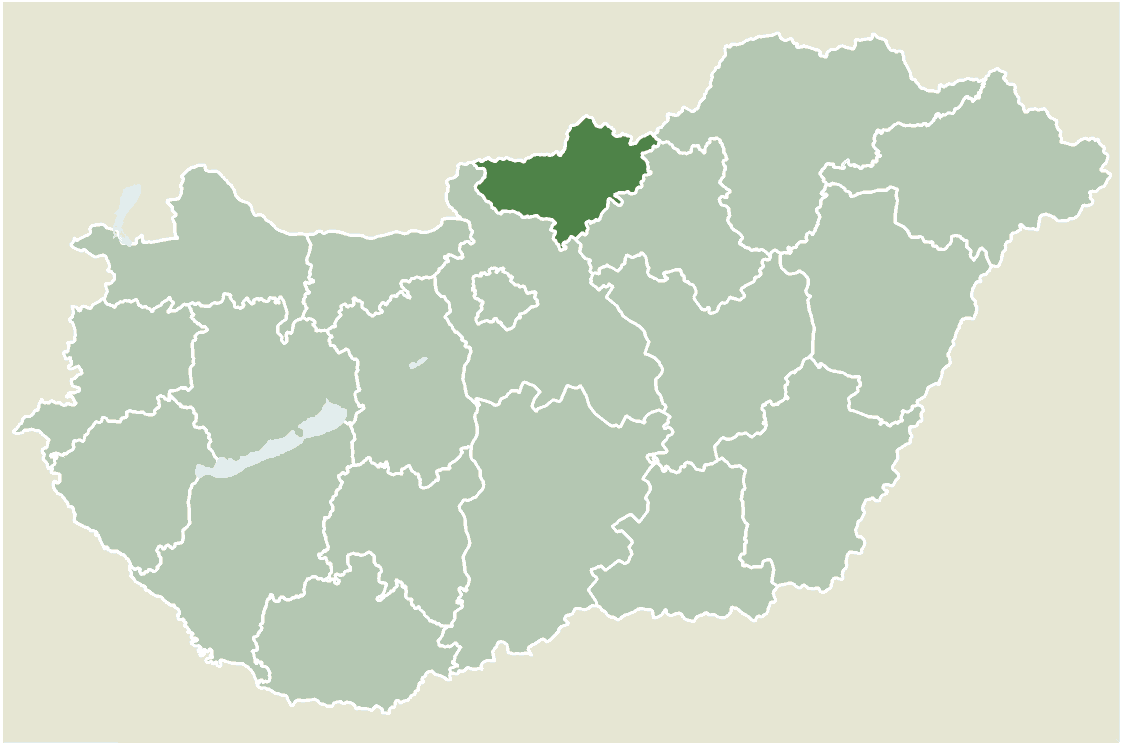
- Location of Nógrád county in Hungary

- Location of Lucfalva
- Coordinates: 48.03051°N 19.68951°E
- Country: Hungary
- County: Nógrád

Area
  - Total: 14.1 km^{2} (5.4 sq mi)

Population (2004)
  - Total: 631
  - Density: 44.75/km^{2} (115.9/sq mi)

Population by ethnicity (2011)
  - Hungarians: 93.4%
  - Gypsies: 25.4%
  - Slovaks: 24.3%
  - Germans: 0.6%
  - Other: 0.2%
  - Unreported: 6.2%

Population by religion (2011)
  - Lutherans: 55.6%
  - Roman Catholic: 23.4%
  - Calvinists: 0.2%
  - Non-religious: 5.5%
  - Other: 6.6%
  - Unreported: 9.3%
- Time zone: UTC+1 (CET)
  - Summer (DST): UTC+2 (CEST)
- Postal code: 3129
- Area code: 32

Lucfalva (Slovak: Lucina) is a village in Nógrád County, Hungary.
