= Szendehely =

Szendehely Sende
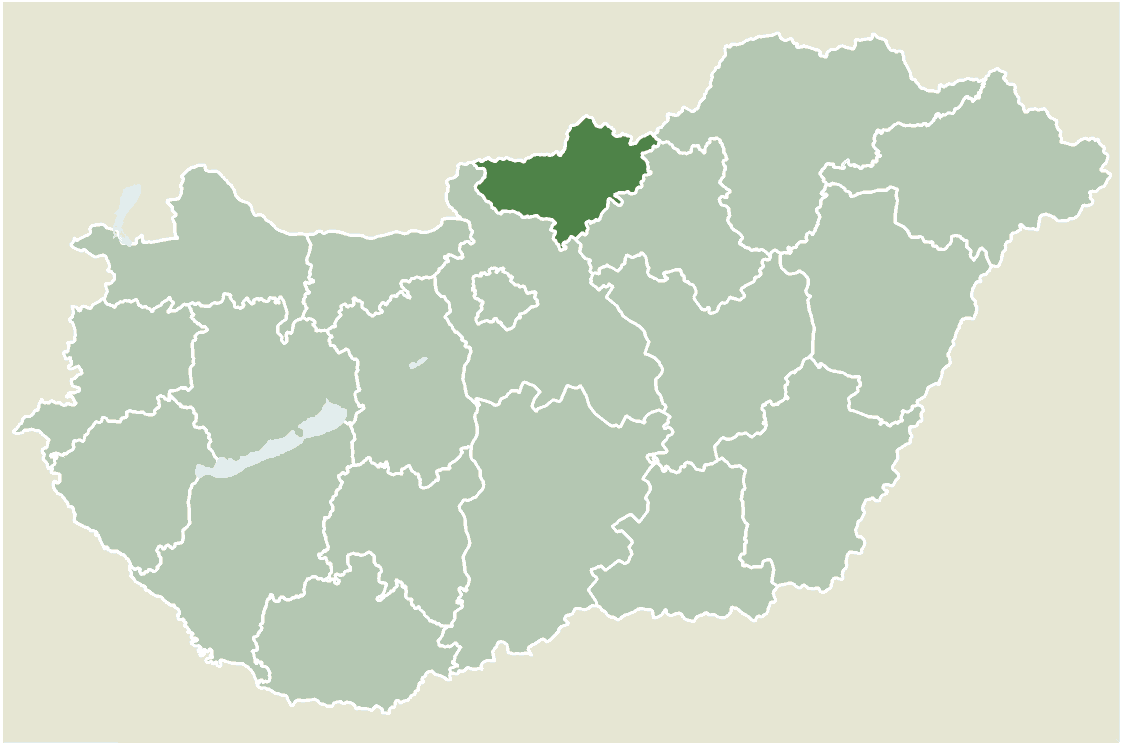
- Location of Nógrád county in Hungary

- Location of Szendehely
- Coordinates: 47.85585°N 19.10300°E
- Country: Hungary
- County: Nógrád

Area
  - Total: 10.04 km^{2} (3.88 sq mi)

Population (2004)
  - Total: 1,478
  - Density: 147.21/km^{2} (381.3/sq mi)
- Time zone: UTC+1 (CET)
  - Summer (DST): UTC+2 (CEST)
- Postal code: 2640
- Area code: 35

Szendehely (German: Sende) is a village in Nógrád County, Hungary. According to data of the 2001 census, the settlement has a relatively high German population of 37%.
