= Vanyarc =

Vanyarc Veňarec
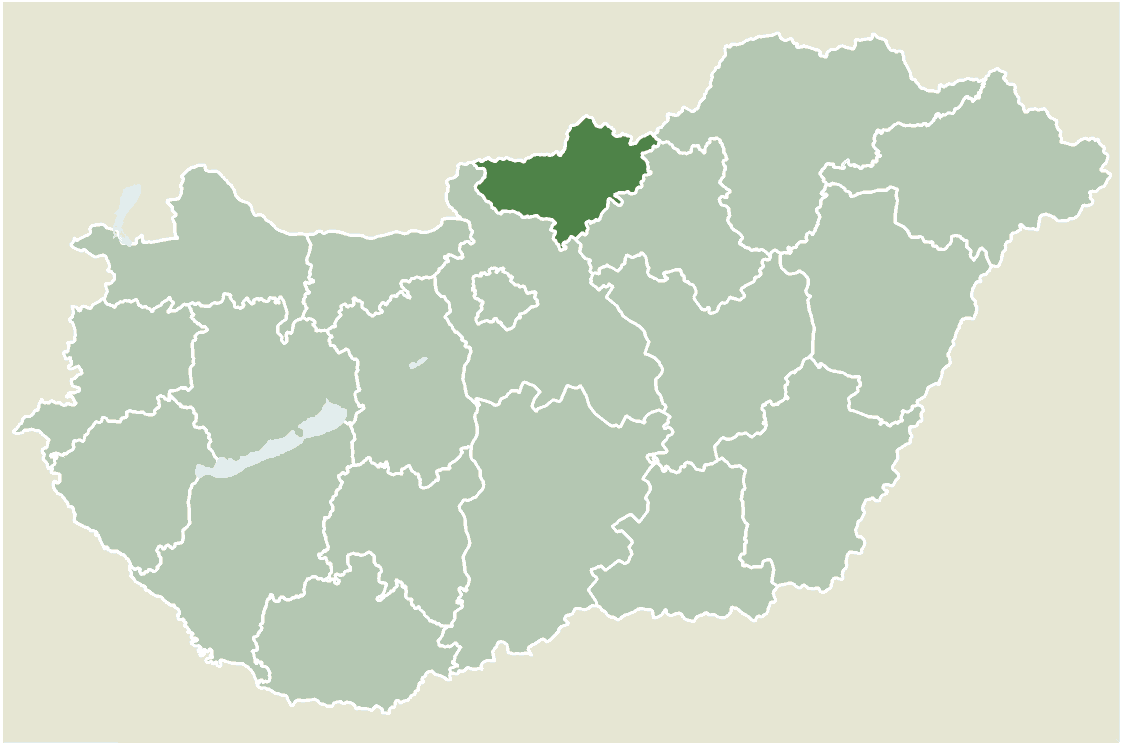
- Location of Nógrád county in Hungary

- Location of Vanyarc
- Coordinates: 47.82116°N 19.45228°E
- Country: Hungary
- County: Nógrád

Area
  - Total: 32.22 km^{2} (12.44 sq mi)

Population (2004)
  - Total: 1,388
  - Density: 43.07/km^{2} (111.6/sq mi)
- Time zone: UTC+1 (CET)
  - Summer (DST): UTC+2 (CEST)
- Postal code: 2688
- Area code: 32

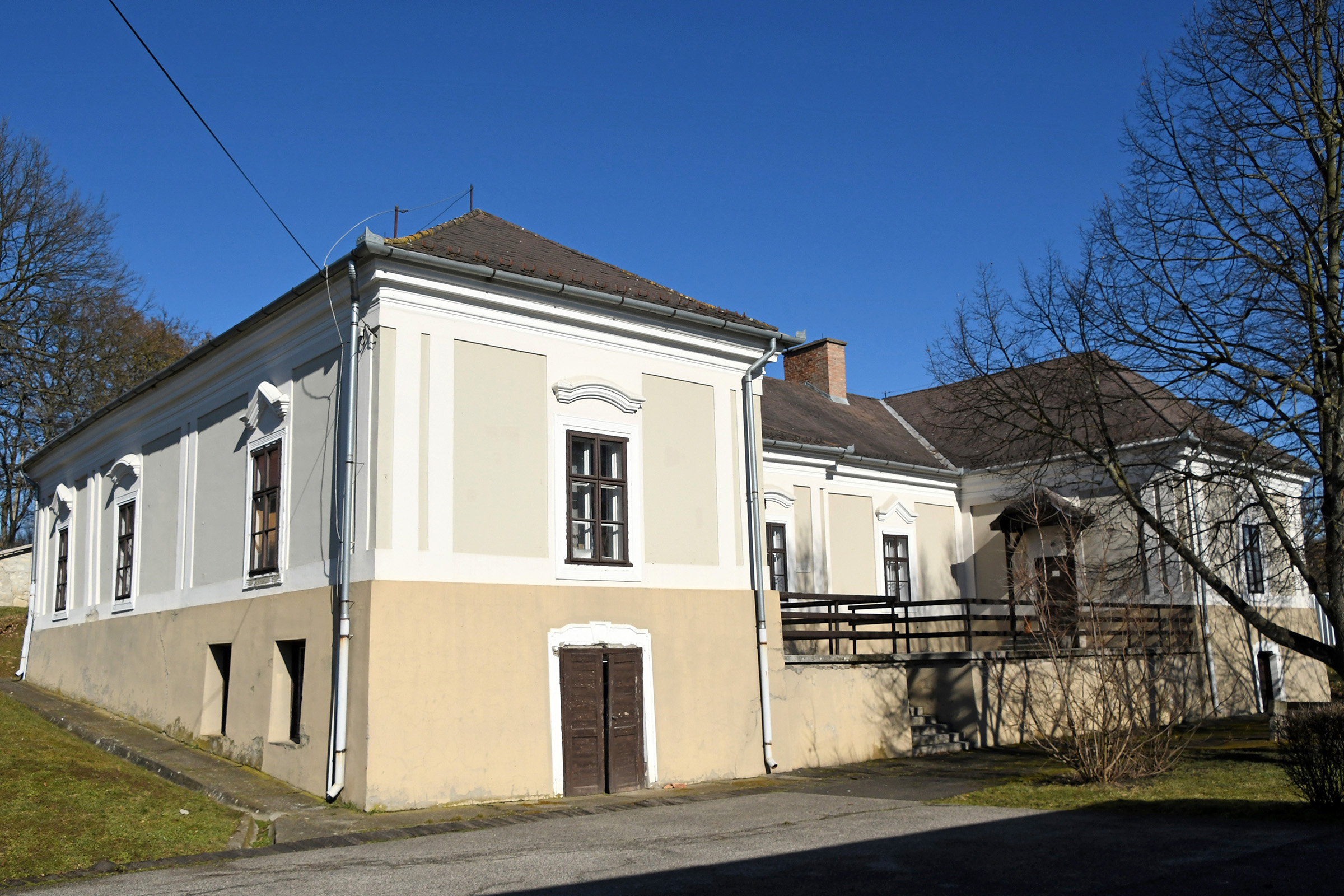
Vanyark Village

Vanyarc (Slovak: Veňarec) is a village in Nógrád County, Hungary.
