= Vizslás =

- Village (község)
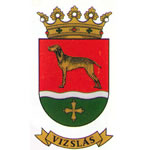
- Coat of arms

- Location of Nograd County in Hungary

- Location of Vizslás in Hungary
- Coordinates: 48°02′56″N 19°49′12″E
- Country: Hungary
- Region: Northern Hungary
- County: Nógrád County
- Subregion: Salgótarján
- First mentioned: 1456

Government
  - Mayor: Jenő Angyal (MSZP)

Area
  - Total: 10.12 km^{2} (3.91 sq mi)
- Elevation: 232 m (761 ft)

Population (1 Jan. 2015)
  - Total: 1 316
  - Density: 130.53/km^{2} (338.1/sq mi)
- Time zone: UTC+1 (CET)
  - Summer (DST): UTC+2 (CEST)
- Postal code: 3128
- Area code: 32

Vizslás is a village in Nógrád County, Northern Hungary Region, Hungary.
