= Mihálygerge =

Village in Nógrád County, Hungary

Coordinates: 48°11′N 19°38′E

Mihálygerge is a village in Nógrád County, Hungary with 490 inhabitants (2025).

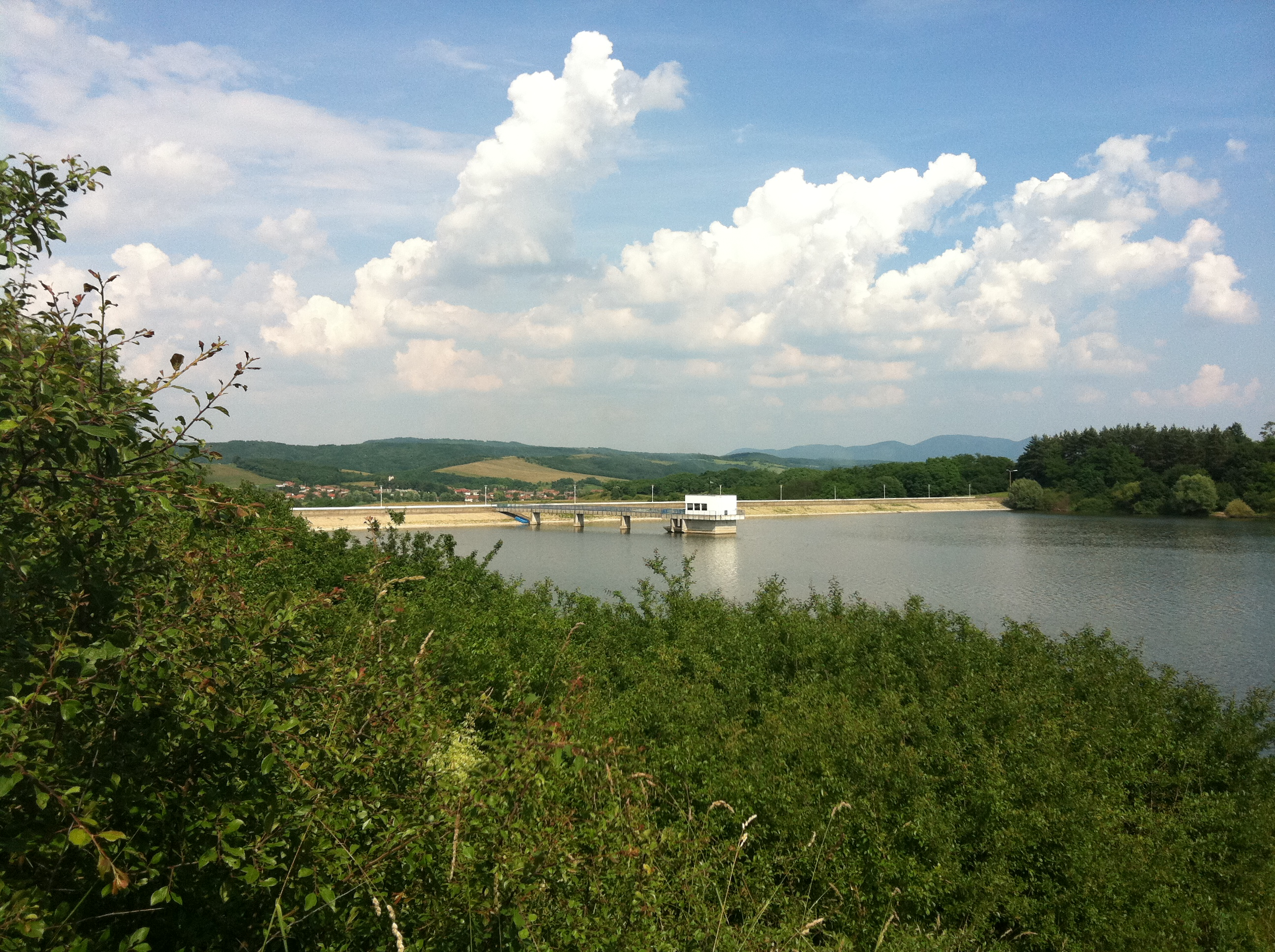
