= Rákóczibánya =

- Village (község)
- Coat of arms

- Location of Nograd County in Hungary

- Location of Rákóczibánya in Hungary
- Coordinates: 48°01′43″N 19°52′16″E
- Country: Hungary
- Region: Northern Hungary
- County: Nógrád County
- Subregion: Salgótarján

Government
  - Mayor: Jakab Gábor (Ind.)

Area
  - Total: 4.57 km^{2} (1.76 sq mi)

Population (1 Jan. 2015)
  - Total: 668
  - Density: 146/km^{2} (380/sq mi)
- Time zone: UTC+1 (CET)
  - Summer (DST): UTC+2 (CEST)
- Postal code: 3151
- Area code: 32
- Website: http://rakoczibanya.hu/

Rákóczibánya is a village in Nógrád County, Northern Hungary Region, Hungary.
