= Kétbodony =

Village in Nógrád County, Hungary

Coordinates: 47°59′N 19°17′E

Kétbodony is a village in Nógrád County, Hungary, with 438 inhabitants as of 2014. It is in the southwestern part of the county, in a valley of the Cserhát River. Its distance from the capital, Budapest, is 70 kilometres, from Balassagyarmat 23 km, and from Vác 30 km.
