= Nógrád County =

County of Hungary

Coordinates: 48.00°N 19.57°E

Nógrád County Nógrád megye
- County
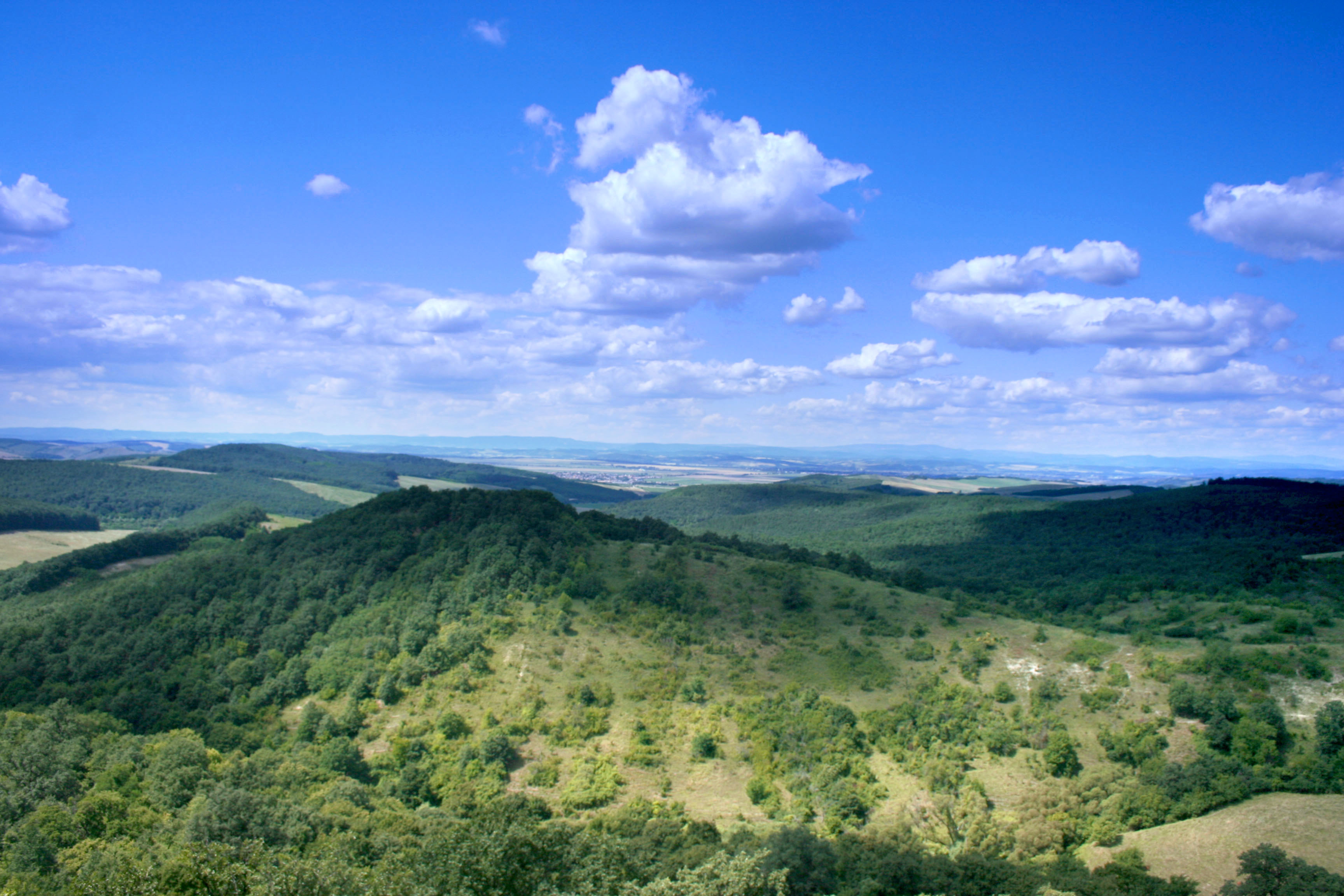
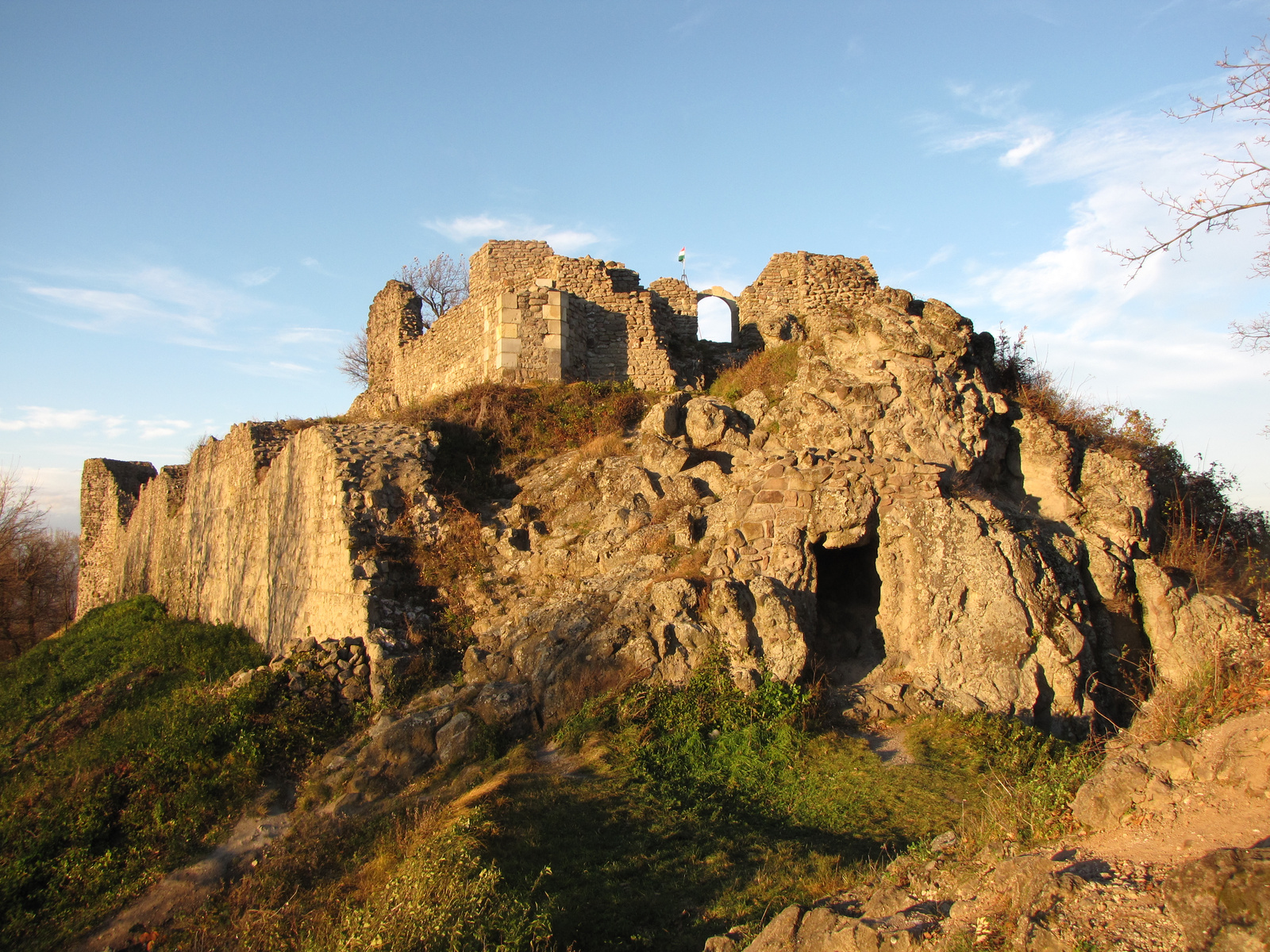
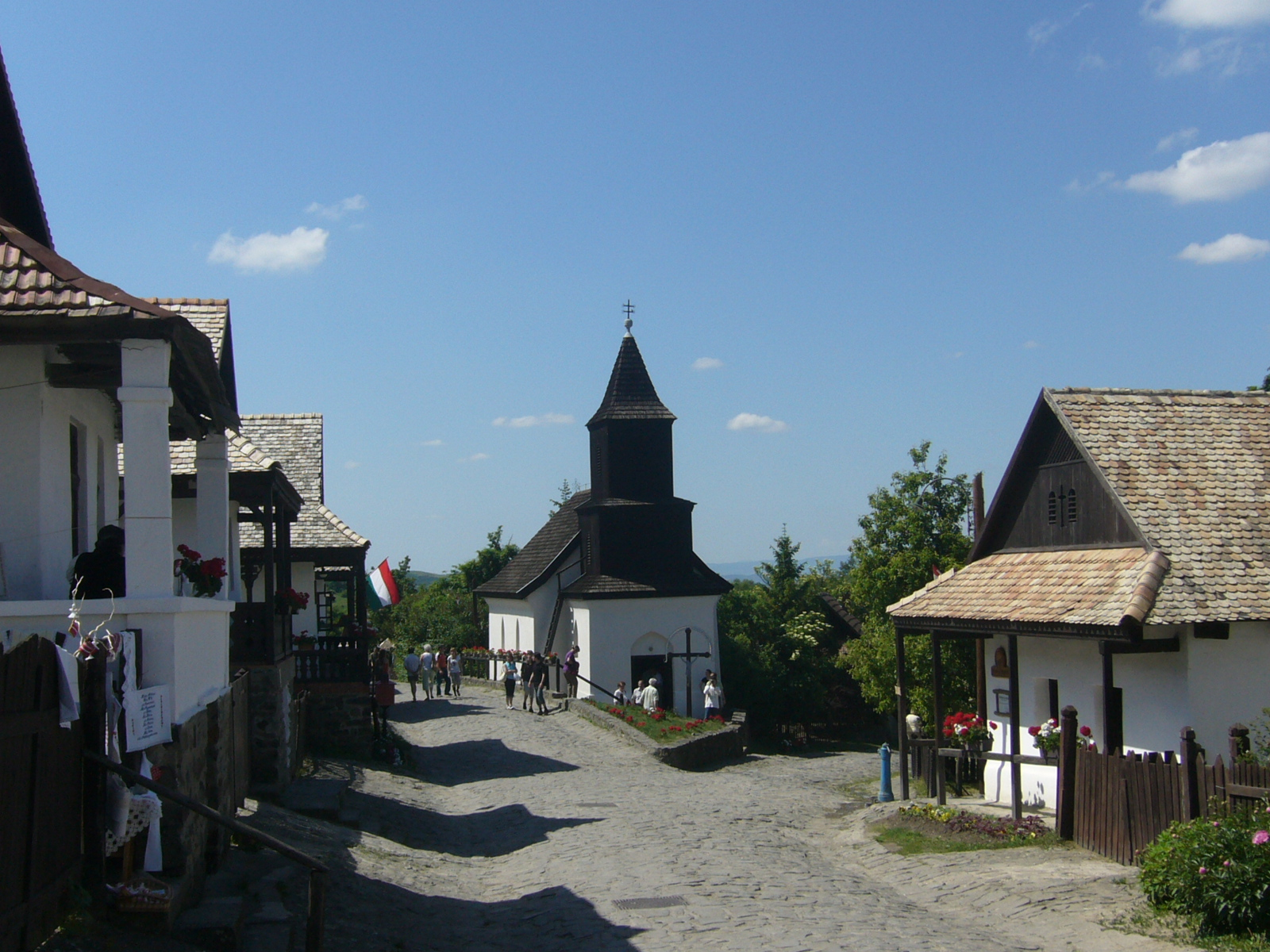
- Descending, from top: hills near Hollókő, Castle of Drégely, view of Hollókő

- Flag Coat of arms

- Nógrád County within Hungary
- Country: Hungary
- Region: Northern Hungary
- County seat: Salgótarján
- Districts: 6 districts: Balassagyarmat District; Bátonyterenye District; Pásztó District; Rétság District; Salgótarján District; Szécsény District

Government
  - President of the General Assembly: Nándor Skuczi (Fidesz-KDNP)

Area
  - Total: 2,545.48 km^{2} (982.82 sq mi)
  - Rank: 18th in Hungary

Population (2022)
  - Total: 182,459
  - Rank: 19th in Hungary
  - Density: 71.6796/km^{2} (185.649/sq mi)

GDP
  - Total: HUF 303 billion €0.972 billion (2016)
- Postal code: 2175 – 2179, 2610, 2611, 2616 – 2619, 264x – 269x, 304x – 31xx
- Area code(s): (+36) 32, 35
- ISO 3166 code: HU-NO
- Website: nograd.hu

Nógrád (Hungarian: Nógrád megye, pronounced [ˈnoːɡraːd]; Slovak: Novohradská župa) is a county (Hungarian: megye) of Hungary. It sits on the northern edge of Hungary and borders Slovakia.

== Description ==
Nógrád county lies in northern Hungary. It shares borders with Slovakia and the Hungarian counties Pest, Heves and Borsod-Abaúj-Zemplén. The capital of Nógrád county is Salgótarján. Its area is 2,544 km^{2} (982 sq mi). It is the smallest county by population and the second smallest by area (after Komárom-Esztergom).

Nógrád is famous for its historic architecture of ancient Gothic churches and stone castles dated to the 13th century. Some historic landmarks includes the Salgó Castle and several baroque buildings constructed in the 18th century and the Vay, Teleki. Much of the northern border of the county is formed by the river Ipoly. The mountain ranges Börzsöny, Cserhát and Mátra lie partly in the county.

Due to the mountains, the county is characterised by small villages nestled in the valleys. The two largest settlements are Balassagyarmat, the former county seat, and Salgótarján, which has become a center of industry in the early 20th century due to coal mines nearby.

== History ==
Nógrád (Latin: comitatus Neogradiensis, German: Neuburg or Neograd, Slovak: Novohrad) was also the name of a historic administrative county (comitatus) of the Kingdom of Hungary. The name stems from the former Nógrád castle (Slovak: Novohrad - this name is still used in Slovakia as well as the informal designation of the corresponding territory, now located in southern Slovakia and in northern Hungary). In turn, Novohrad means "new castle" in Slovak.

== Demographics ==
The population of Nógrád County was 182,459 as of the 2022 Census, with a population density of 72 individuals per square kilometer (72/km^{2}). The number of households was 75,526 and the number of families was 49,077. Since the 2011 Census, the population decreased by 19,968 (-9.9%).

Historical population
Year	Pop.	±%
1870	125,522	—
1880	123,261	−1.8%
1890	141,314	+14.6%
1900	159,266	+12.7%
1910	174,155	+9.3%
1920	185,217	+6.4%
1930	200,438	+8.2%
1941	211,253	+5.4%
1949	214,757	+1.7%
1960	235,675	+9.7%
1970	234,430	−0.5%
1980	240,251	+2.5%
1990	227,137	−5.5%
2001	220,261	−3.0%
2011	202,427	−8.1%
2022	182,459	−9.9%

=== Ethnicity ===
In the 2022 Census, the vast majority (86.3%) of the population identified as Hungarian. A minority of 7.8% identified as belonging to another ethnic group and 11.3% of the population did not respond. The ethnic groups most identified with were Romani (5.8%), Slovak (1.2%), and German (0.4%). Small numbers identified as other domestic ethnic groups (390) or other groups (421). (Note: Individuals were able to identify with multiple ethnic groups, so the percentages may not add up to 100%.)

In the 2011 Census, 85.4% of the population identified as Hungarian. Nearly a tenth (9.6%) of the population identified as belonging to another ethnic group and 13.0% did not respond. Romani made up 7.5% of the population, Slovak 1.3%, and German (0.5%). Small numbers identified as other domestic ethnic groups (407) or other groups (308).

=== Religion ===
Religion in Nógrád County (2022 census – of those who declared their religion (63.6%))
1. Roman Catholic (66.8%)
2. Lutheran (5.20%)
3. Calvinistic (3.00%)
4. Faith Church (1.40%)
5. Other Christian denomination (4.10%)
6. Other religion (0.30%)
7. Not religious (19.2%)

In the 2022 Census, just over half of the population (51.4%) were religious adherents. The largest religious community was Roman Catholic (42.5%). Other communities included Lutheran (3.4%), Calvinist (2.0%), Greek Catholic (0.3%), Other Christian denomination (2.1%), and other religious affiliations (0.2%). Small numbers (less than 100) were affiliated with Judaism and Orthodox Christianity. The non-religious made up 12.2% of the population. More than a third (36.4%) of the population did not respond.

In the 2011 Census, 63.4% of the population were religious adherents. The largest religious community was Roman Catholic (55.4%). Others included Lutheran (3.9%), Calvinist (2.1%), Greek Catholic (0.2%), Other Christian denomination (1.6%), and other religious affiliations (0.2%). Small numbers (less than 100) were affiliated with Judaism and Orthodox Christianity. Atheists made up (0.9%) of the population and other non-religious made up 12.2%. Nearly a quarter (23.5%) of the population did not respond.

In 1930, the population was 85.6% Roman Catholic, 9.4% Lutheran, 2.8% Jewish, 1.9% Calvinist, and others (0.3%).

== Regional structure ==
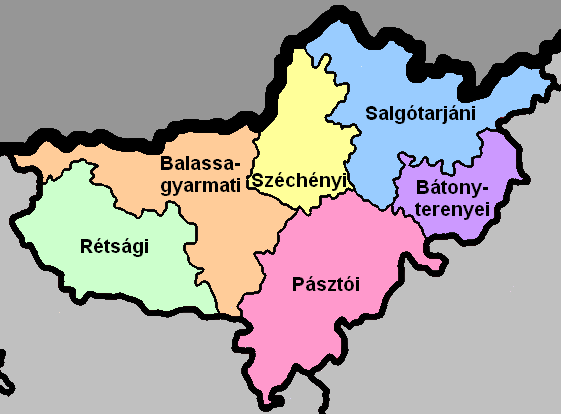
District of Nógrád County

No.	English and Hungarian names	Area (km^{2})	Population (2022)	Density (pop./km^{2})	Seat	No. of municipalities
1	Balassagyarmat District; Balassagyarmati járás	532.94	36,606	69	Balassagyarmat	29
2	Bátonyterenye District; Bátonyterenyei járás	215.45	18,878	88	Bátonyterenye	8
3	Pásztó District; Pásztói járás	551.56	29,415	53	Pásztó	26
4	Rétság District; Rétsági járás	435.03	24,222	56	Rétság	25
5	Salgótarján District; Salgótarjáni járás	525.23	55,769	106	Salgótarján	29
6	Szécsény District; Szécsényi járás	285.26	17,569	62	Szécsény	14
Nógrád County		2,545.48	182,459	72	Salgótarján	131

== Politics ==
The Nógrád County Council, elected at the 2024 local government elections, is made up of 15 counselors, with the following party composition:

Party	Seats	Current County Assembly
Fidesz-KDNP	10	
Our Homeland Movement	3	
Democratic Coalition	1	
Momentum Movement	1	

=== Presidents of the General Assembly ===
List of presidents since 1990
Ferenc Korill (SZDSZ)	1990–1994
Sándor Smitnya (SZDSZ)	1994–1998
Zsolt Becsó (Fidesz)	1998–2002
Ottó Dóra (MSZP)	2002–2006
Zsolt Becsó (Fidesz-KDNP)	2006–2014
Nándor Skuczi (Fides-KDNP)	2014–

== Municipalities ==
Nógrád County has 1 urban county, 5 towns and 125 villages.

City with county rights

(ordered by population, as of 2011 census)

- Salgótarján (37,262) – county seat

Towns

- Balassagyarmat (16,397)
- Bátonyterenye (12,841)
- Pásztó (9,689)
- Szécsény (5,962)
- Rétság (2,822)

Villages

- Alsópetény
- Alsótold
- Bánk
- Bárna
- Becske
- Bercel
- Berkenye
- Bér
- Bokor
- Borsosberény
- Buják
- Cered
- Csécse
- Cserháthaláp
- Cserhátsurány
- Cserhátszentiván
- Csesztve
- Csitár
- Debercsény
- Dejtár
- Diósjenő
- Dorogháza
- Drégelypalánk
- Ecseg
- Egyházasdengeleg
- Egyházasgerge
- Endrefalva
- Erdőkürt
- Erdőtarcsa
- Érsekvadkert
- Etes
- Felsőpetény
- Felsőtold
- Galgaguta
- Garáb
- Herencsény
- Héhalom
- Hollókő
- Hont
- Horpács
- Hugyag
- Iliny
- Ipolyszög
- Ipolytarnóc
- Ipolyvece
- Jobbágyi
- Karancsalja
- Karancsberény
- Karancskeszi
- Karancslapujtő
- Karancsság
- Kazár
- Kálló
- Keszeg
- Kétbodony
- Kisbágyon
- Kisbárkány
- Kisecset
- Kishartyán
- Kozárd
- Kutasó
- Legénd
- Litke
- Lucfalva
- Ludányhalászi
- Magyargéc
- Magyarnándor
- Márkháza
- Mátramindszent
- Mátranovák
- Mátraszele
- Mátraszőlős
- Mátraterenye
- Mátraverebély
- Mihálygerge
- Mohora
- Nagybárkány
- Nagykeresztúr
- Nagylóc
- Nagyoroszi
- Nemti
- Nézsa
- Nógrád
- Nógrádkövesd
- Nógrádmarcal
- Nógrádmegyer
- Nógrádsáp
- Nógrádsipek
- Nógrádszakál
- Nőtincs
- Őrhalom
- Ősagárd
- Palotás
- Patak
- Patvarc
- Piliny
- Pusztaberki
- Rákóczibánya
- Rimóc
- Romhány
- Ságújfalu
- Sámsonháza
- Somoskőújfalu
- Sóshartyán
- Szalmatercs
- Szanda
- Szarvasgede
- Szátok
- Szendehely
- Szente
- Szécsénke
- Szécsényfelfalu
- Szilaspogony
- Szirák
- Szuha
- Szurdokpüspöki
- Szügy
- Tar
- Terény
- Tereske
- Tolmács
- Vanyarc
- Varsány
- Vizslás
- Zabar

== Gallery ==
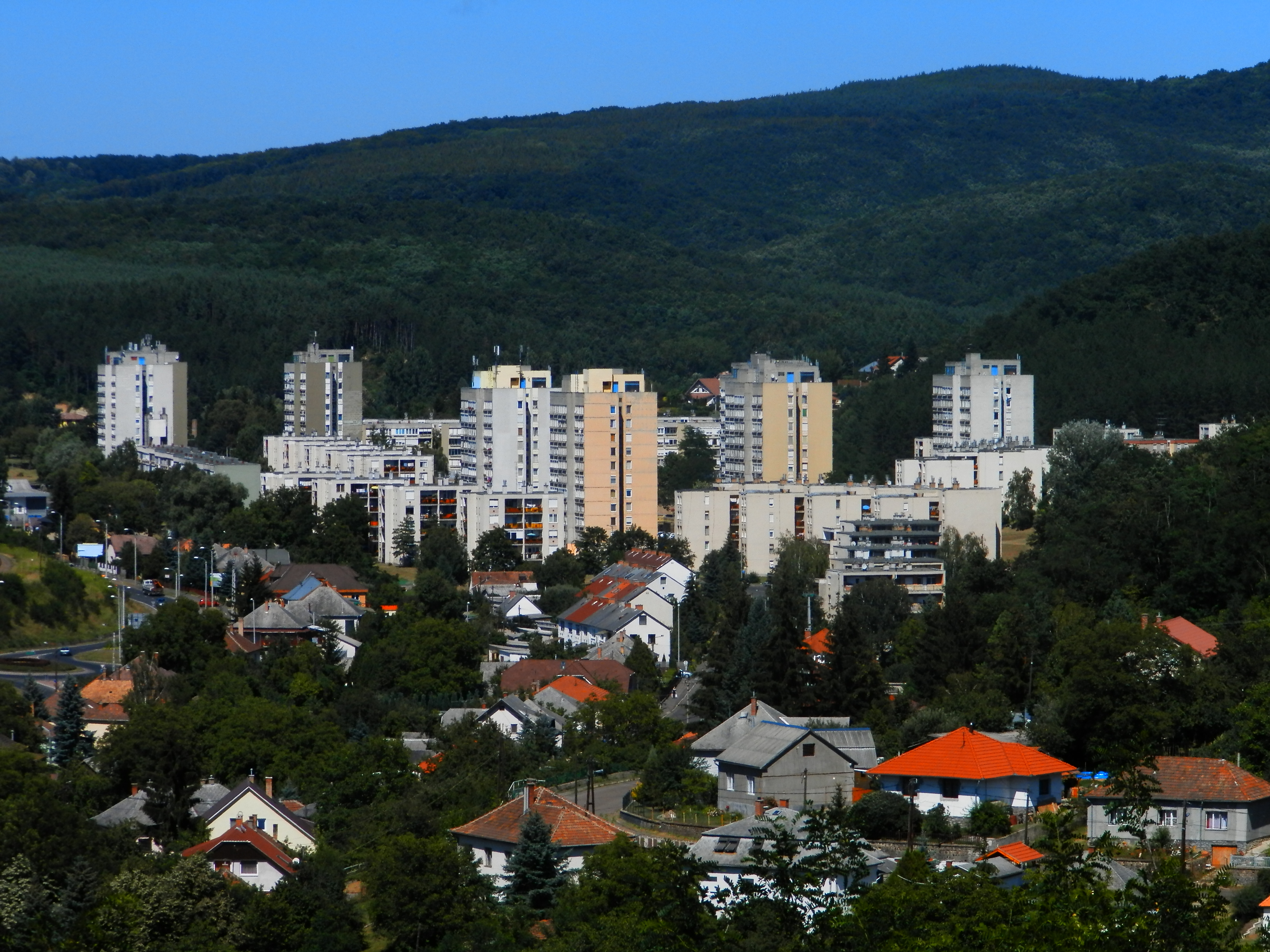
Salgótarján, the capital of the county

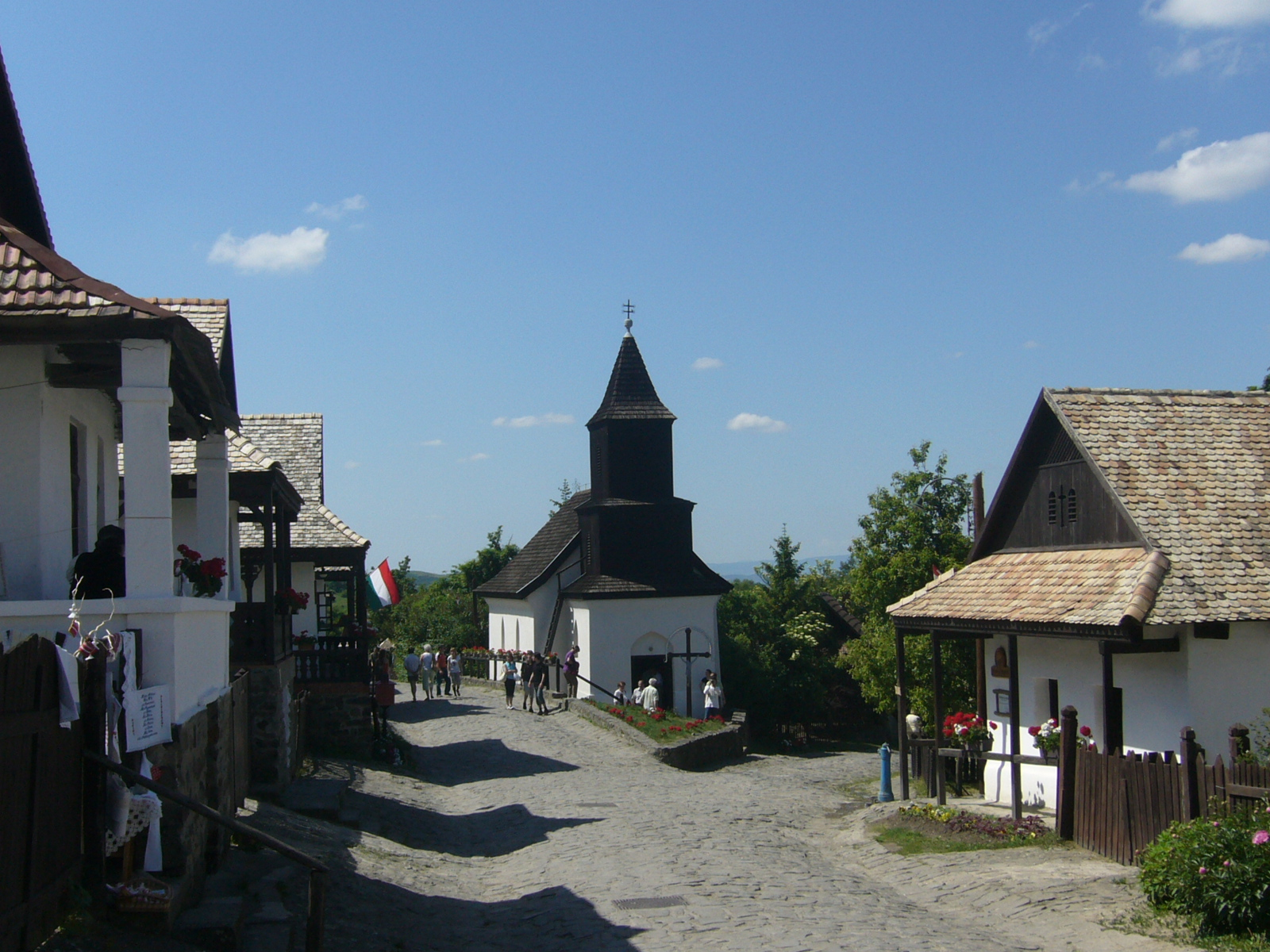
Hollókő village

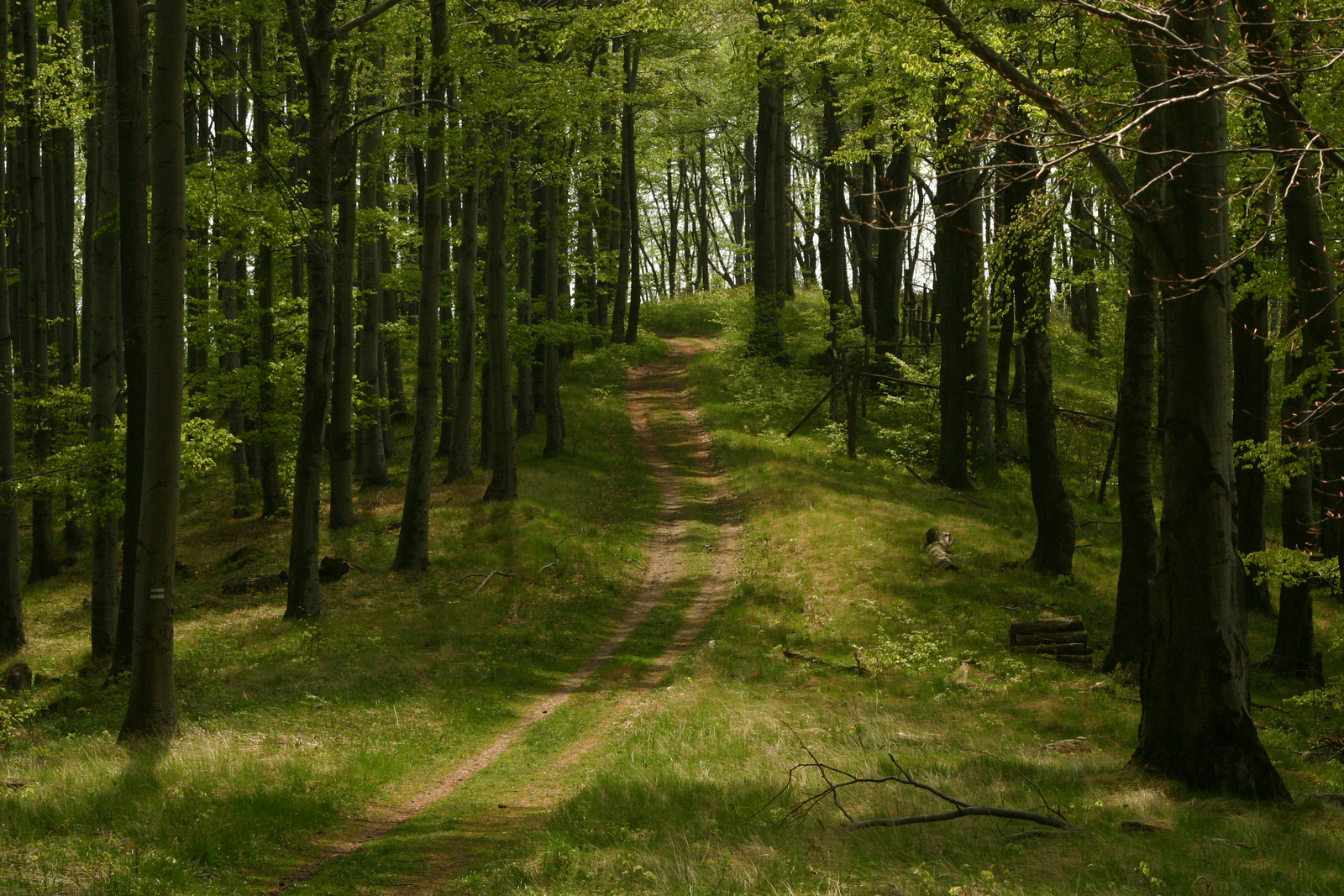
Tourist path in the Börzsöny near Diósjenő

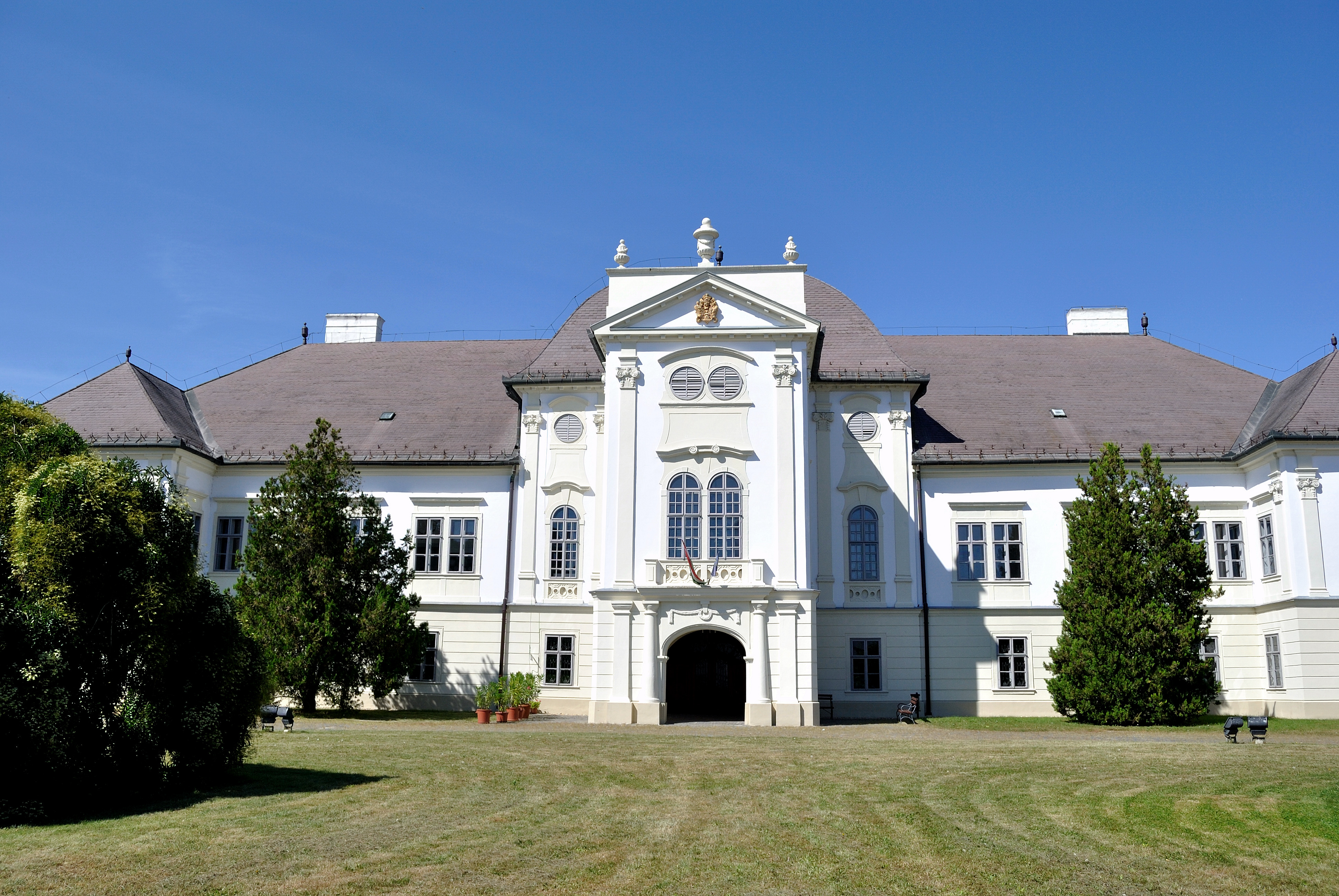
Forgách Mansion in Szécsény

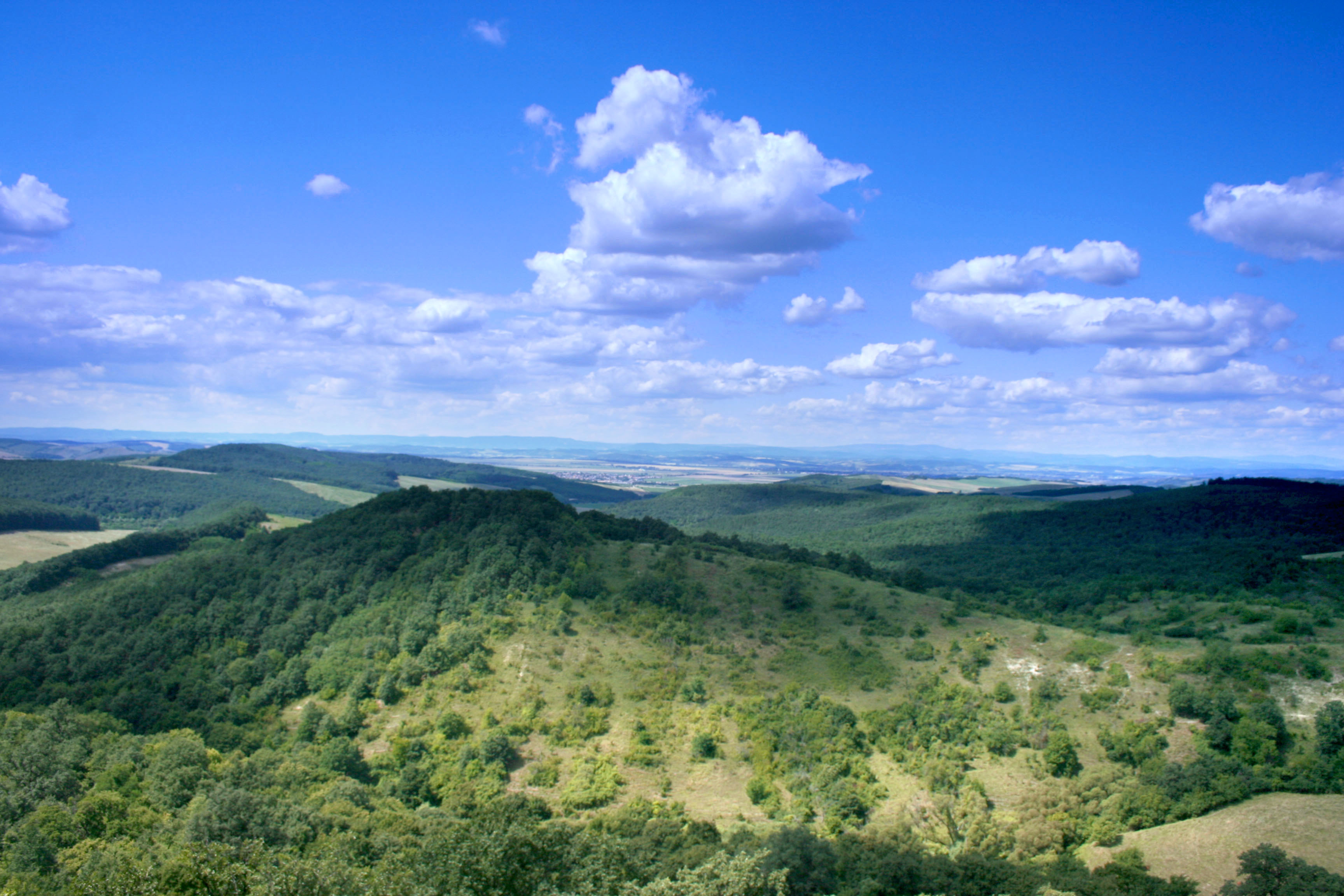
The Cserhát mountain range

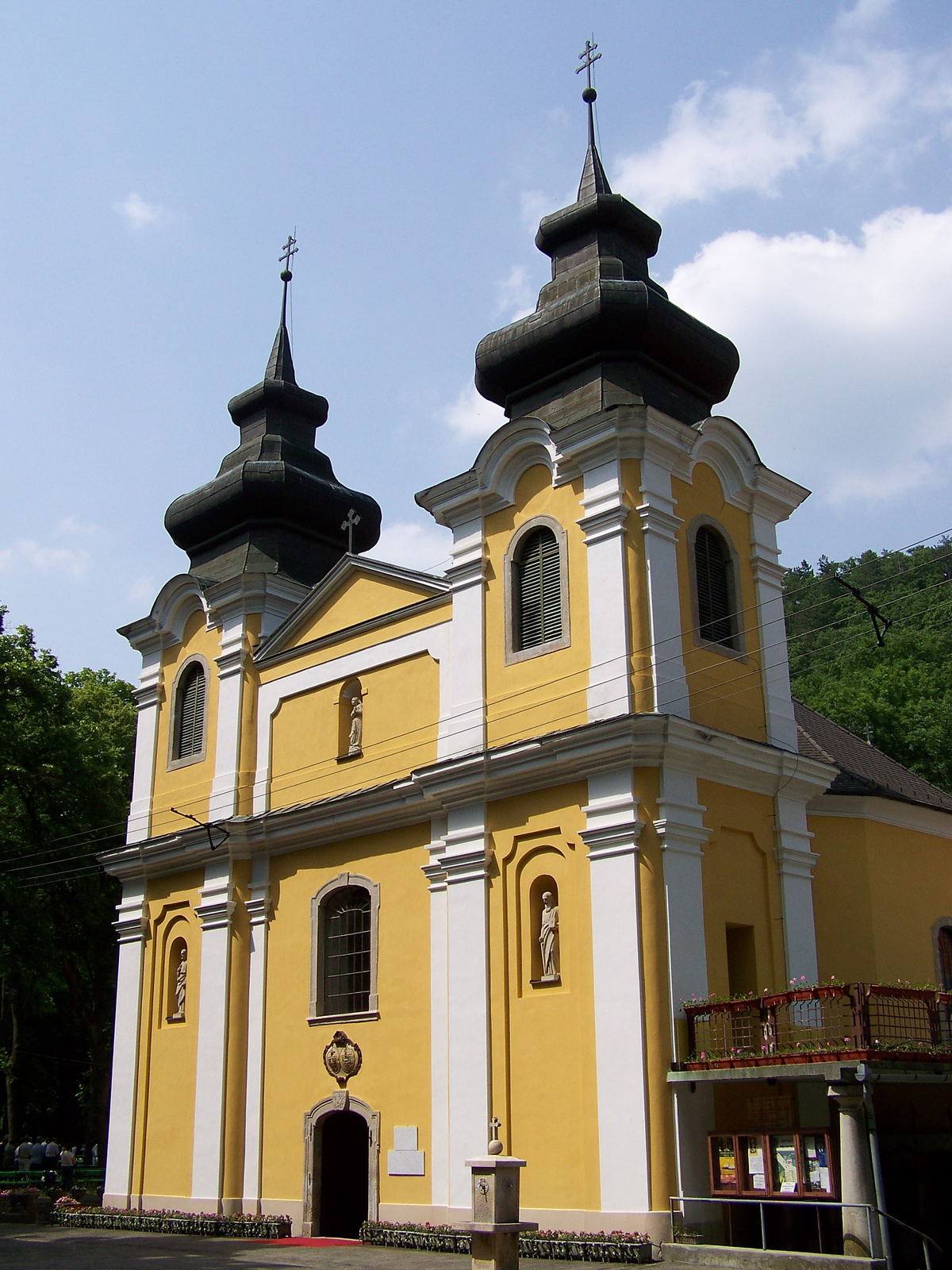
Our Lady church in Mátraverebély

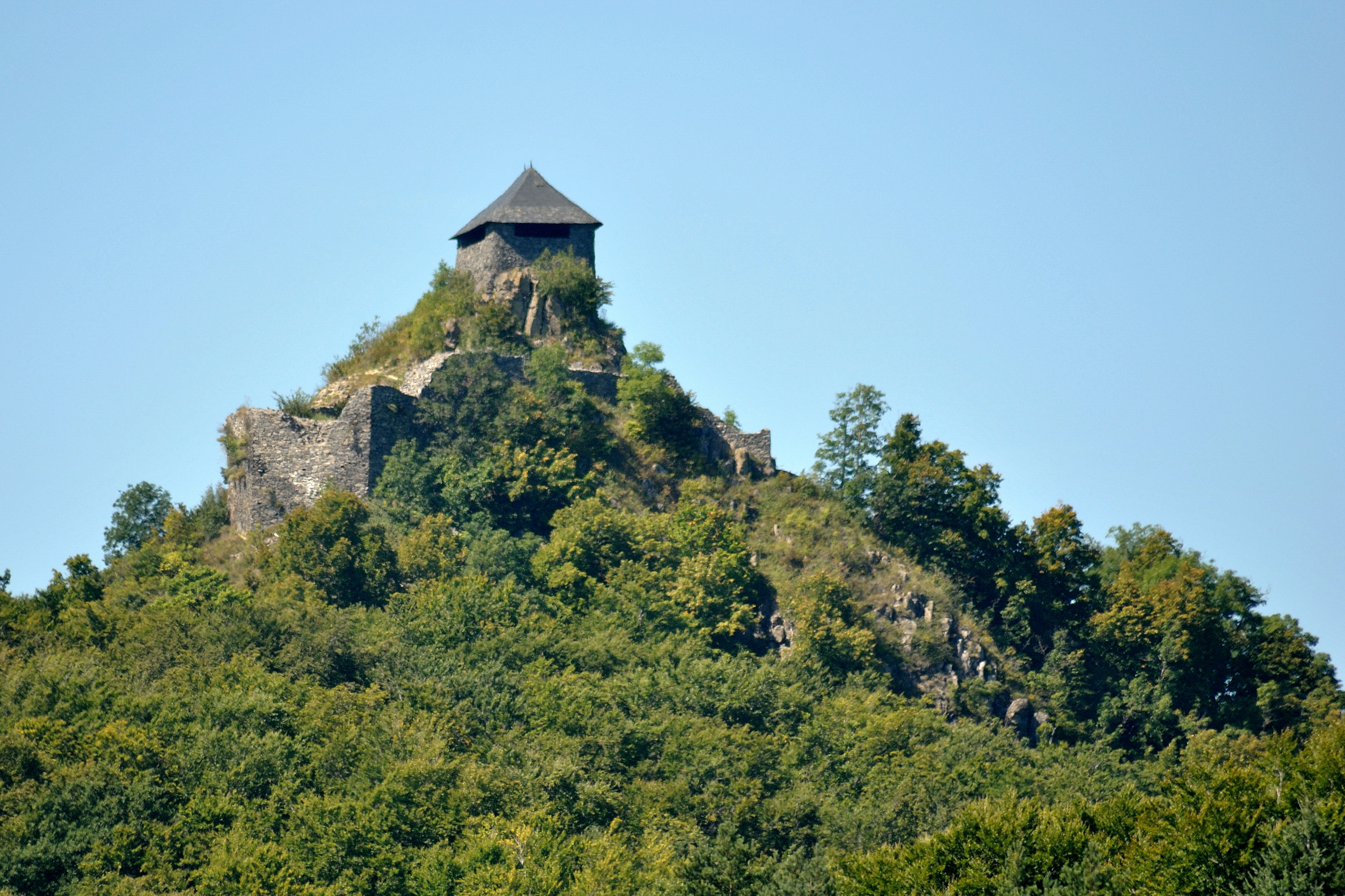
Salgó Castle

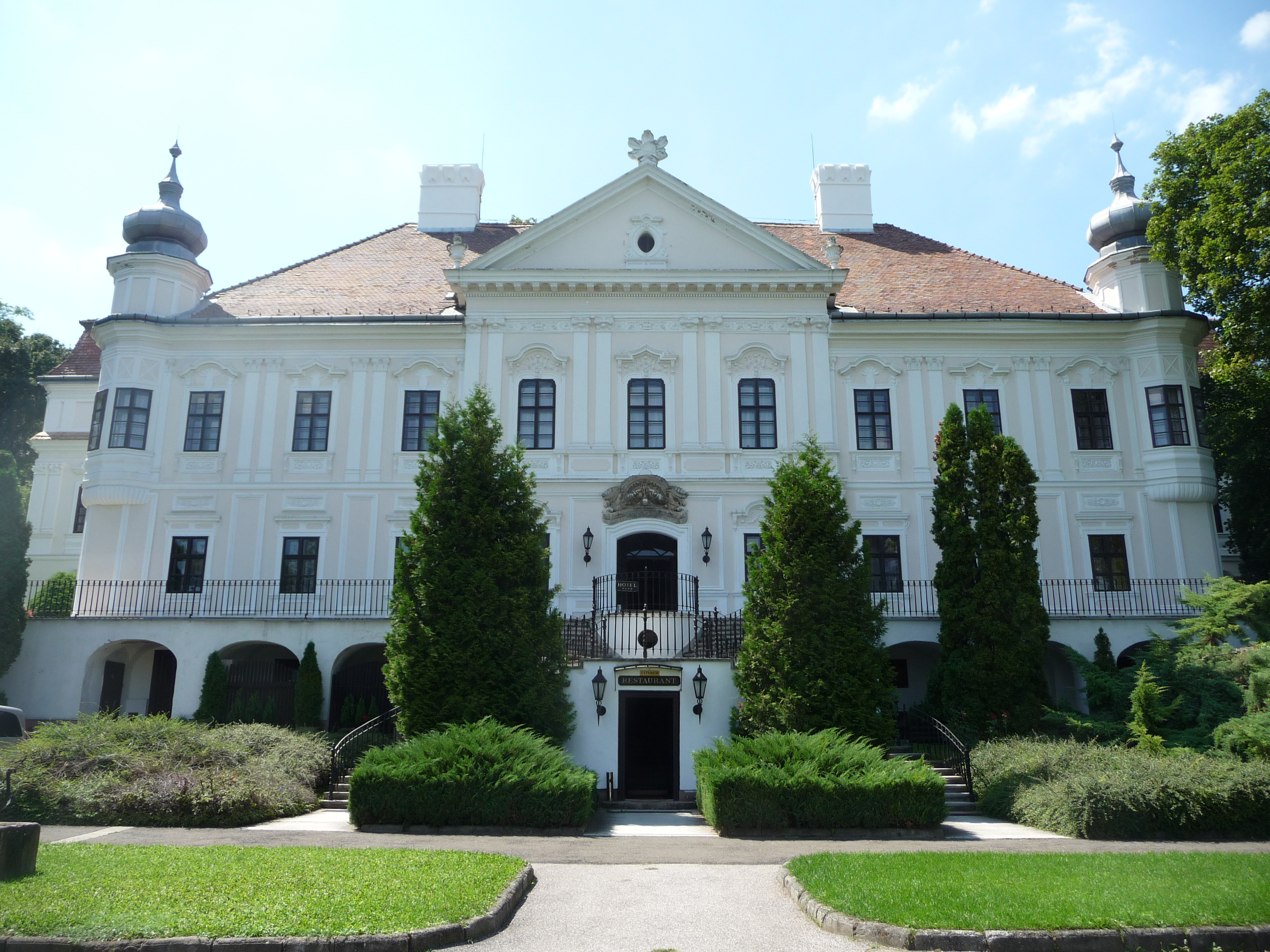
Teleki Mansion in Szirák
