= Keszeg =

- Flag Coat of arms

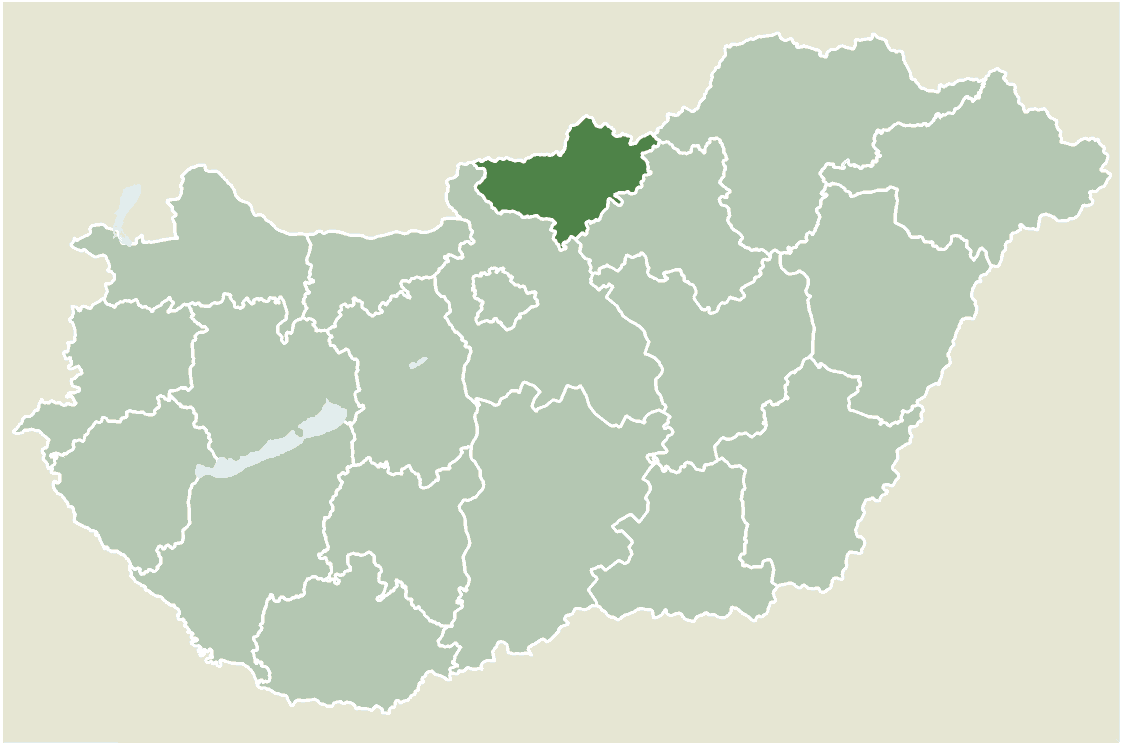
- Location of Nógrád county in Hungary

- Location of Keszeg
- Coordinates: 47.83595°N 19.23848°E
- Country: Hungary
- County: Nógrád

Area
  - Total: 9.95 km^{2} (3.84 sq mi)

Population (2004)
  - Total: 688
  - Density: 69.14/km^{2} (179.1/sq mi)
- Time zone: UTC+1 (CET)
  - Summer (DST): UTC+2 (CEST)
- Postal code: 2616
- Area code: 35

Keszeg is a village in Nógrád county, Hungary. The county is on the northern edge of Hungary and borders Slovakia.

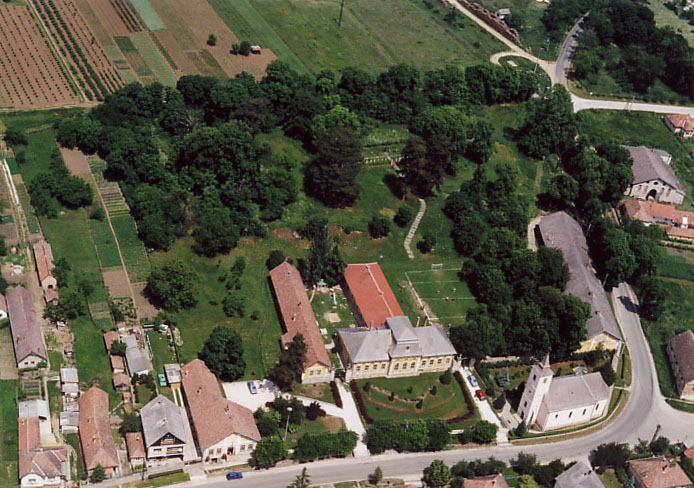
Keszeg, palace from above
