= Nagykeresztúr =

Village in Nógrád County, Hungary

Coordinates: 48°02′19″N 19°43′20″E

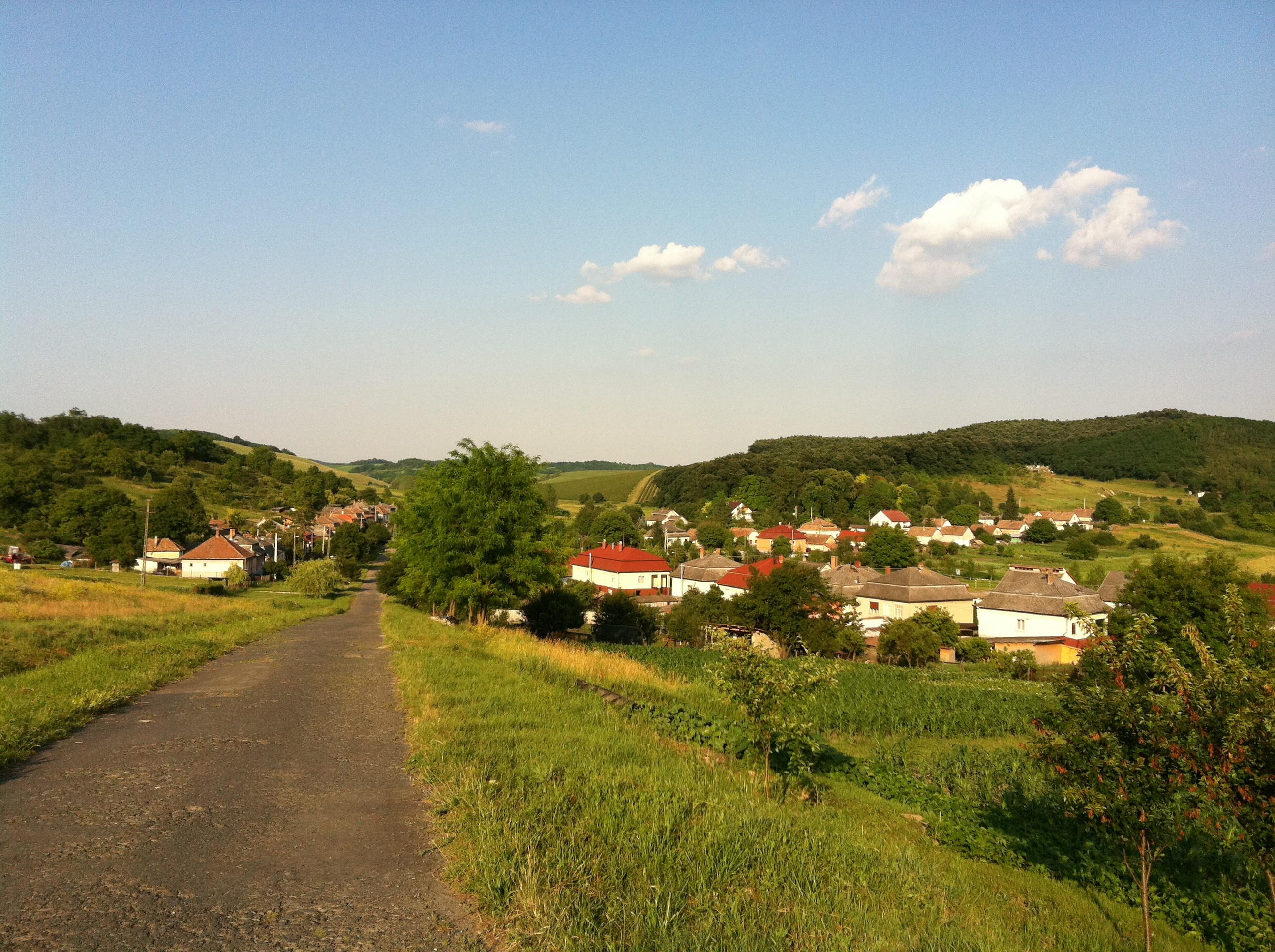

Nagykeresztúr is a village in Nógrád County, Hungary with 245 inhabitants (2014).
