= Bárna =

Municipality in Nógrád County, Hungary

Coordinates: 48°06′N 19°56′E

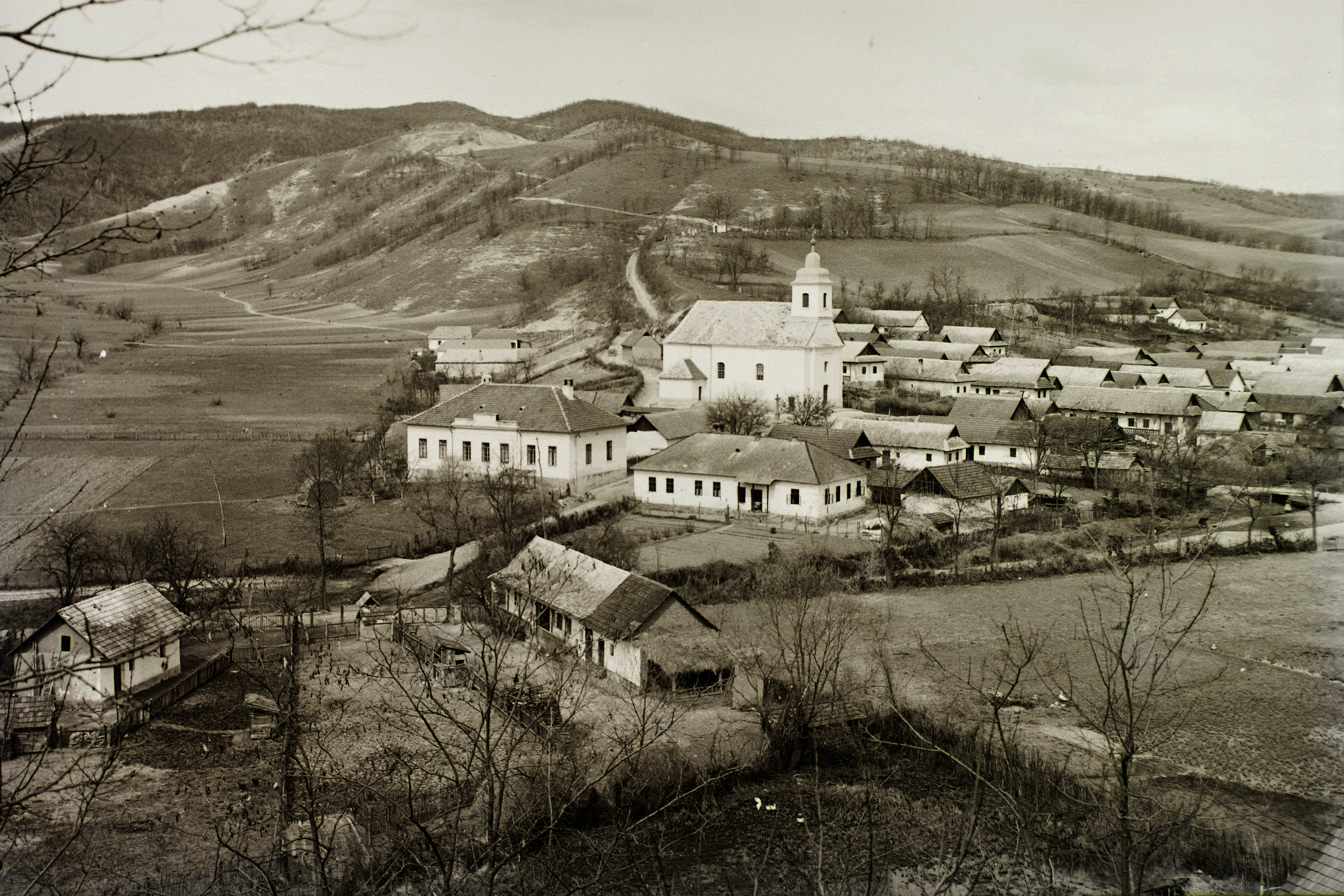
Bárna

Bárna is a village and municipality in the comitat of Nógrád, Hungary. The village is the part of the Nohohrad-Nógrád UNESCO Global Geopark.

== Population ==
Population by year
Year	Population
1870	567
1880	546
1890	629
1900	653
1910	784
1920	930
1930	999
1941	1123
1949	1229
1960	1288
1970	1300
1980	1259
1990	1208
2001	1172
2011	1120
