= Szirák =

Szirák Zirok
- Village (község)
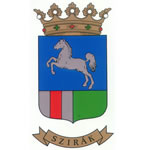
- Coat of arms

- Location of Nograd County in Hungary

- Location in Hungary
- Coordinates: 47°49′53″N 19°31′55″E
- Country: Hungary
- Region: Northern Hungary
- County: Nógrád County
- Subregion: Pásztói
- Established in: 1219

Government
  - Mayor: Jánosné Kómár

Area
  - Total: 19.09 km^{2} (7.37 sq mi)
- Elevation: 156 m (512 ft)

Population (2025)
  - Total: 1,093
  - Density: 64.22/km^{2} (166.3/sq mi)
- Time zone: UTC+1 (CET)
  - Summer (DST): UTC+2 (CEST)
- Postal code: 3044
- Area code: 32
- Website: http://www.szirak.hu/

Szirák (German: Zirok) is a village in Nógrád County, Northern Hungary Region, Hungary.
