= Erdőtarcsa =

Village in Nógrád County, Hungary

Coordinates: 47°45′N 19°32′E

Erdőtarcsa is a village in Nógrád County, Hungary with 624 inhabitants (2001).

Population by year
Year	Population
1870	765
1880	768
1890	738
1900	858
1910	755
1920	881
1930	913
1941	981
1949	1020
1960	1010
1970	962
1980	790
1990	672
2001	648
2011	531
