= Márkháza =

- Coat of arms

- Location of Márkháza in Hungary
- Coordinates: 48.01641°N 19.72170°E
- Country: Hungary
- Region: Northern Hungary
- County: Nógrád
- Subregion: Bátonyterenyei
- Rank: Village

Area
  - Total: 6.31 km^{2} (2.44 sq mi)

Population (1 January 2008)
  - Total: 228
  - Density: 36.1/km^{2} (93.6/sq mi)
- Time zone: UTC+1 (CET)
  - Summer (DST): UTC+2 (CEST)
- Postal code: 3075
- Area code: +36 32
- KSH code: 14641
- Website: http://markhaza.hu/

Márkháza is a village in Nógrád County, Hungary. It is located 15 kilometers from Salgótarján in the Kis Zagyva Valley.

The village is believed to have been named after Mark, the son of one of the owners of Fehérkő Castle. It was first mentioned in writing in 1548, when it was destroyed by Turkish troops. Afterwards, it was known as Tótmarokháza, indicating a Slovak presence and influence in the village.

Historically, the village's primary industry was coal mining.
