= Erdőkürt =

Village in Nógrád County, Hungary

Coordinates: 49°46′N 19°27′E

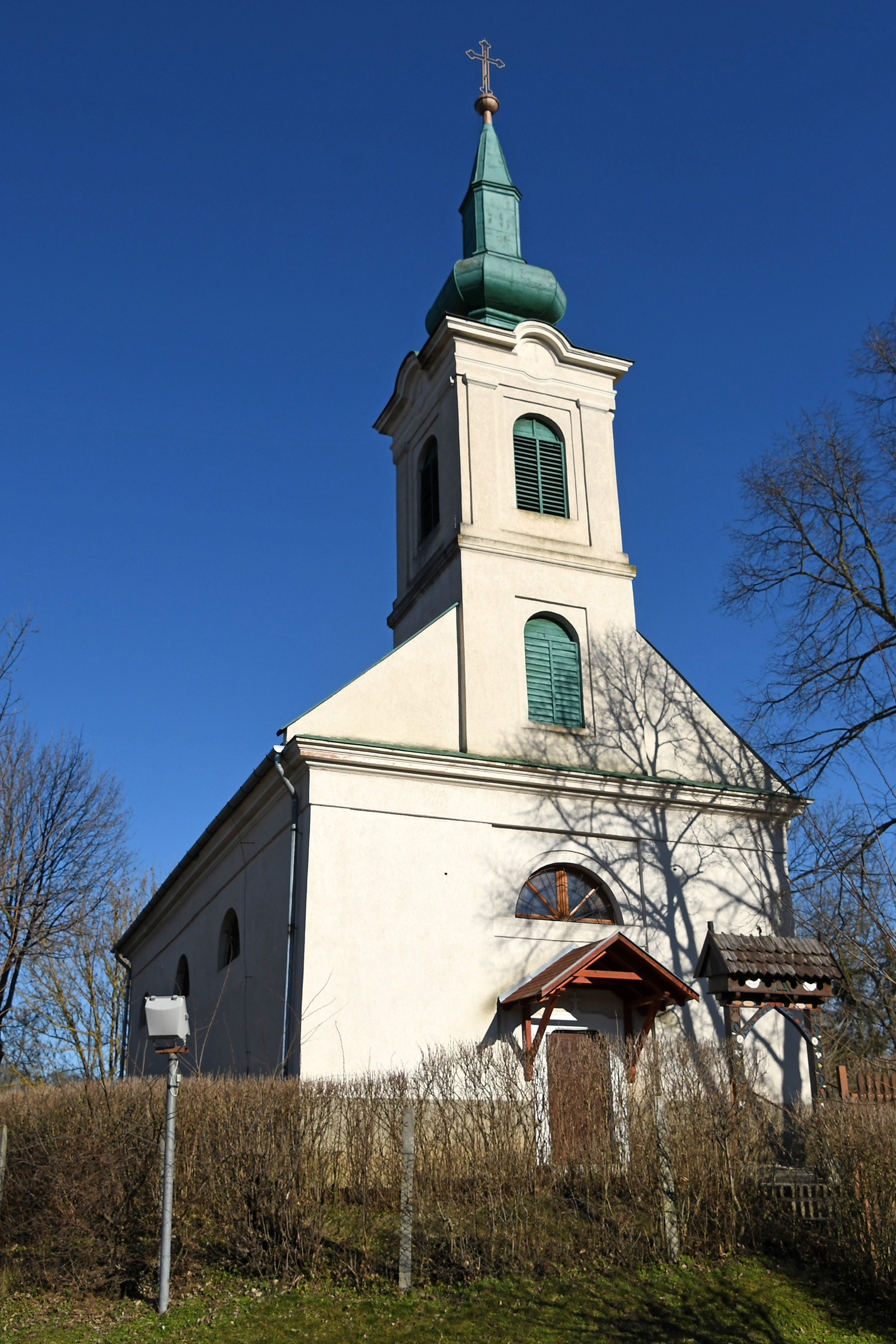

Erdőkürt is a village in Nógrád County, Hungary with 609 inhabitants (2001).

Population by year
Year	Population
1870	658
1880	596
1890	694
1900	825
1910	919
1920	919
1930	906
1941	989
1949	981
1960	993
1970	905
1980	806
1990	685
2001	611
2011	537
