= Egyházasgerge =

Village in Nógrád County, Hungary

Coordinates: 48°10′N 19°38′E

Egyházasgerge is a village in Nógrád County, Hungary with 850 inhabitants (2001).

Coat of arms

Population by year
Year	Population
1870	704
1880	736
1890	768
1900	863
1910	950
1920	1012
1930	944
1941	995
1949	1057
1960	1033
1970	1010
1980	968
1990	908
2001	840
2011	776
