= Cserháthaláp =

- Village
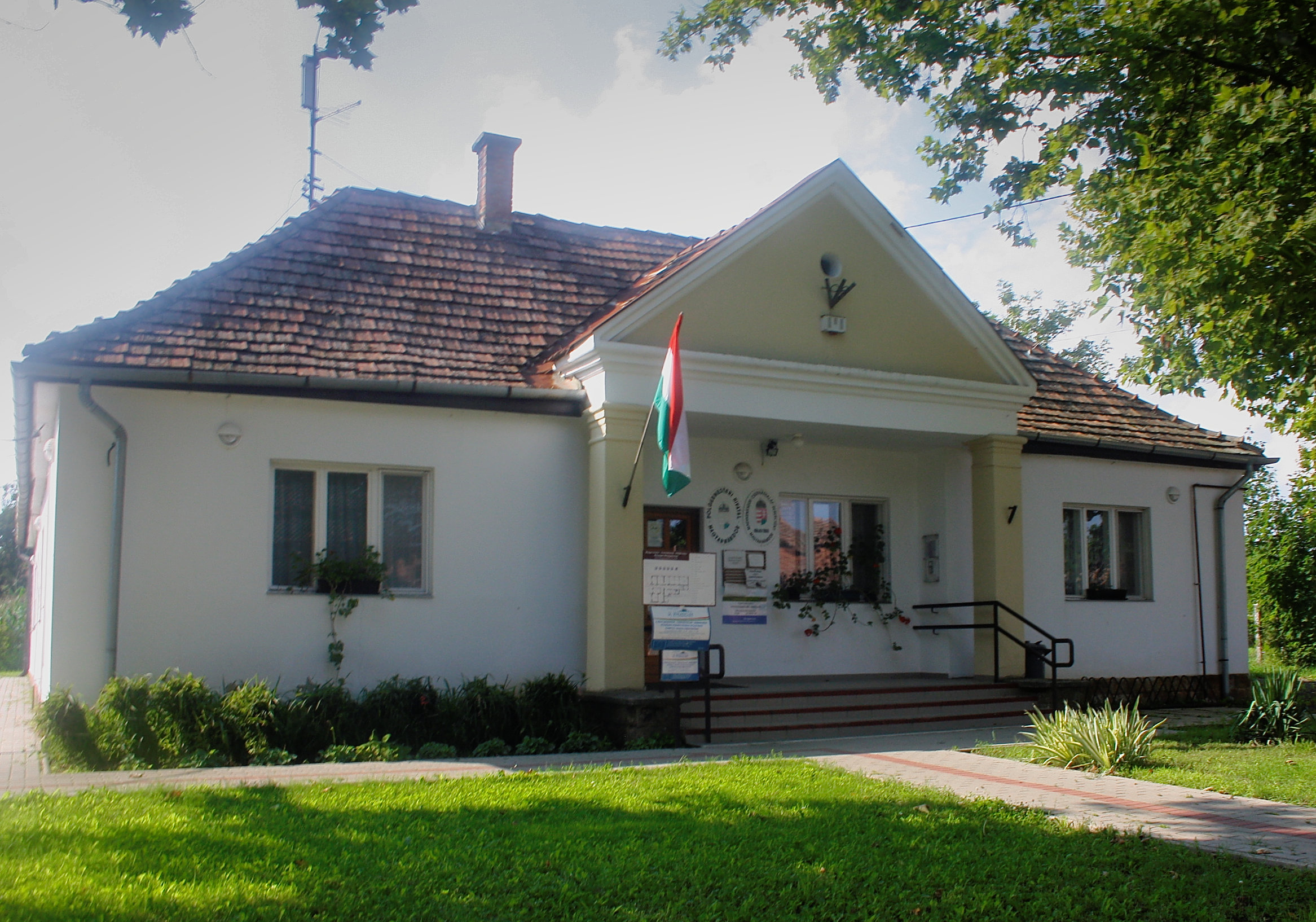

- Coat of arms

- Location within Hungary
- Coordinates: 47°58′51″N 019°22′36″E
- Country: Hungary
- Region: Northern Hungary
- Subregion: Nógrád County

Government
  - mayor: Dávid Dócs (Our Homeland Movement) 2015-2022

Population
  - Total: 398

Cserháthaláp is a village and municipality in the comitat of Nógrád, Hungary.

Population by year
Year	Population
1870	543
1880	483
1890	455
1900	501
1910	478
1920	512
1930	530
1941	501
1949	560
1960	598
1970	568
1980	553
1990	483
2001	419
2011	377
