= Berkenye =

Berkenye Berkina
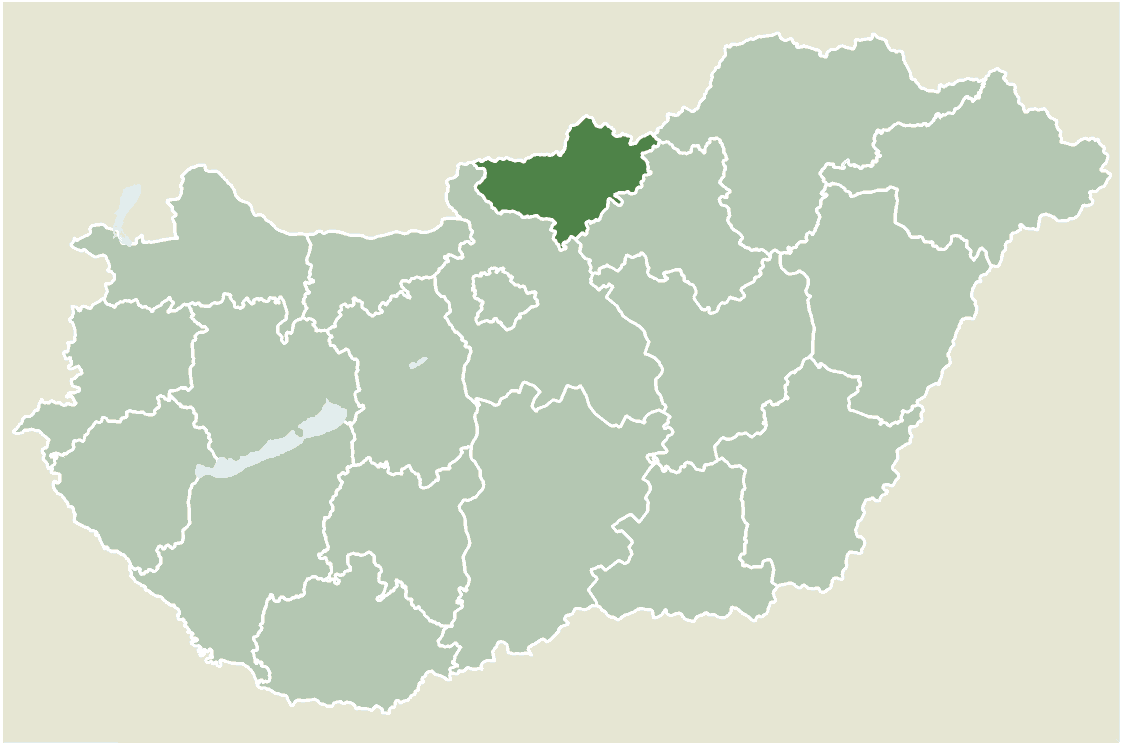
- Location of Nógrád county in Hungary

- Location of Berkenye
- Coordinates: 47.89004°N 19.07083°E
- Country: Hungary
- County: Nógrád

Area
  - Total: 13.46 km^{2} (5.20 sq mi)

Population (2004)
  - Total: 618
  - Density: 45.91/km^{2} (118.9/sq mi)
- Time zone: UTC+1 (CET)
  - Summer (DST): UTC+2 (CEST)
- Postal code: 2641
- Area code: 35

Berkenye (German: Berkina) is a village in Nógrád County, Hungary, near the country's border with Slovakia.

Population by year
Year	Population
1870	371
1880	415
1890	429
1900	482
1910	527
1920	536
1930	588
1941	595
1949	686
1960	699
1970	638
1980	615
1990	604
2001	587
2011	629
