= Nagybárkány =

Village in Nógrád County, Hungary

Coordinates: 47°59′50″N 19°42′14″E

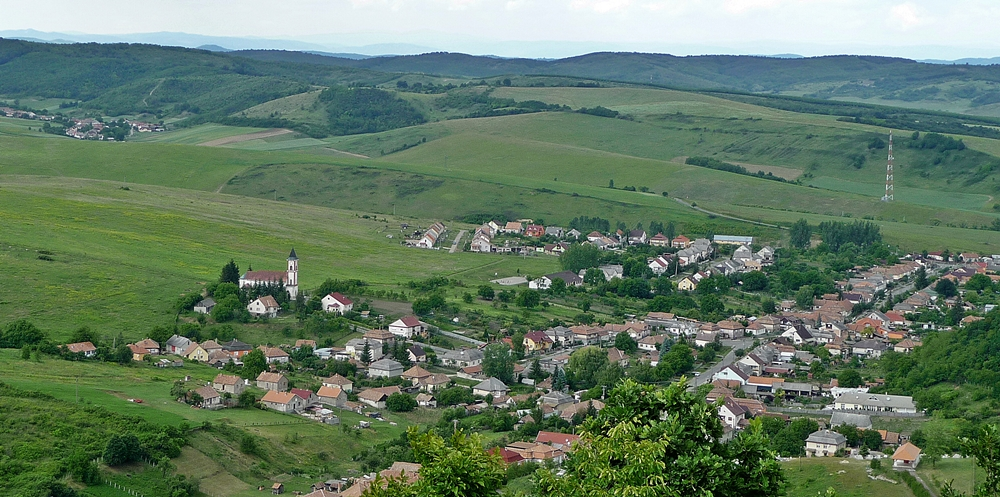

Nagybárkány is a village in Nógrád County, Hungary with 689 inhabitants (2014).
