= Magyargéc =

Village in Nógrád County, Hungary

Coordinates: 48°5′N 19°32′E

Magyargéc (Hungarian pronunciation: [ˈmɒɟɒrɡeːt͡s]) is a village in Nógrád County, Hungary with 788 inhabitants (2025).
