= Nógrádmegyer =

Village in Nógrád County, Hungary

Coordinates: 48°04′07″N 19°37′26″E

Coat of Arms

Nógrádmegyer is a village in Nógrád County, Hungary with 1,549 inhabitants (2025).
