= Piliny =

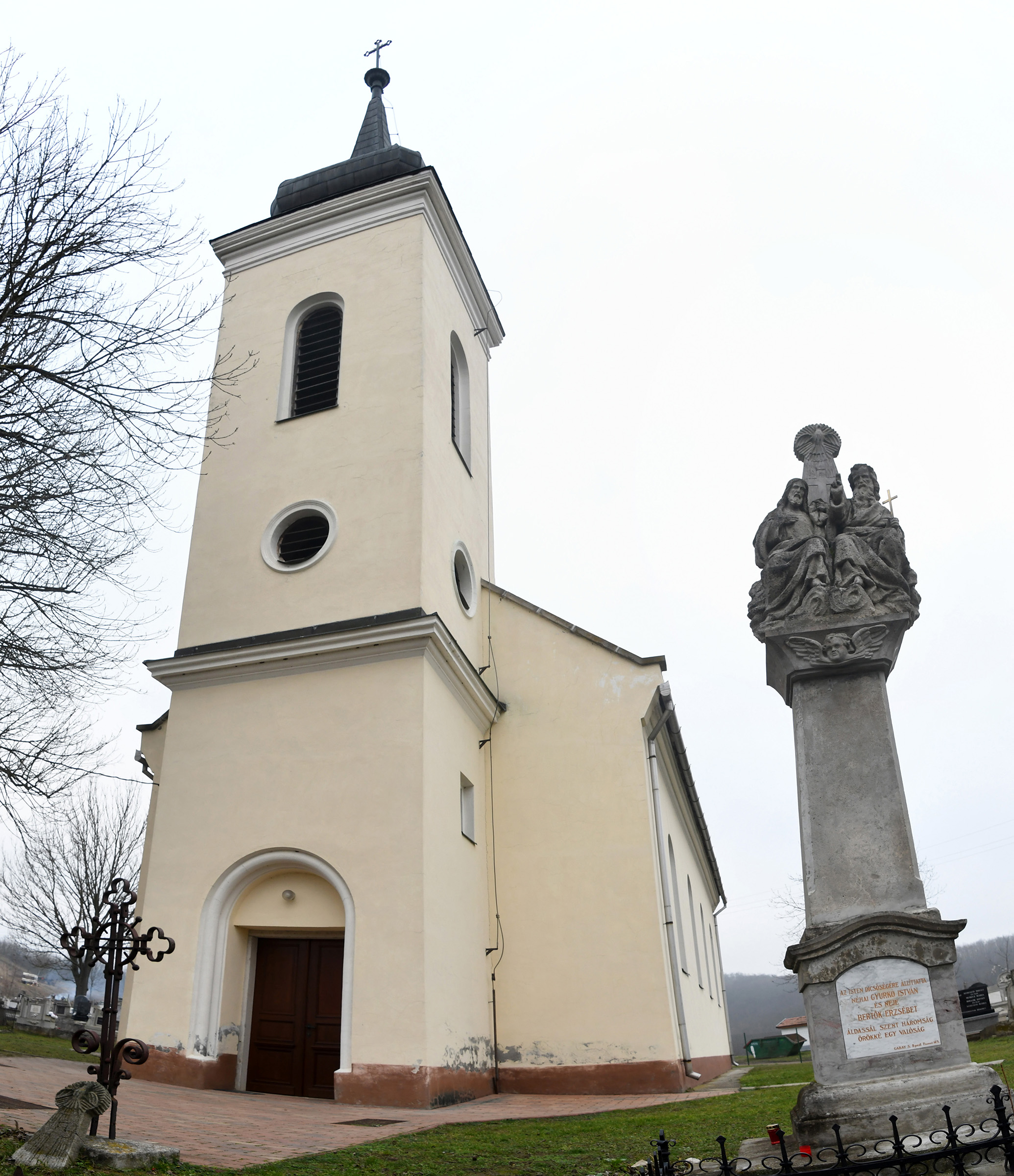
- Roman Catholic Church and Trinity Column

- Coat of arms

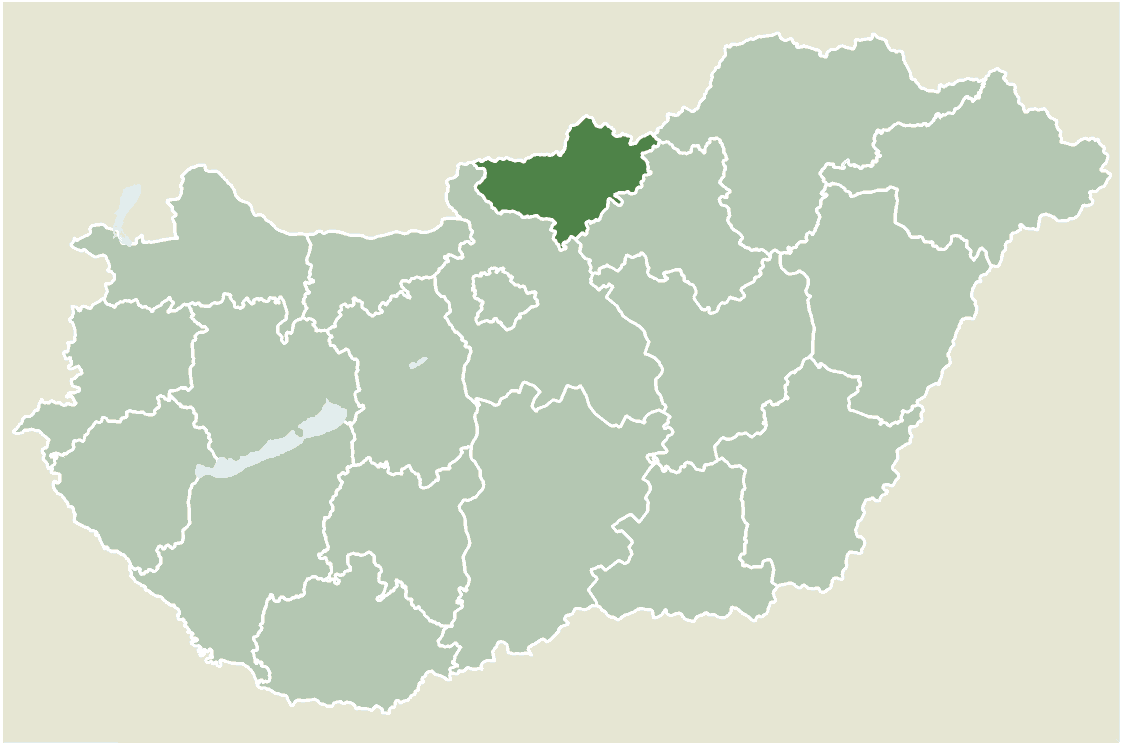
- Location of Nógrád county in Hungary

- Location of Piliny
- Coordinates: 48.13863°N 19.60032°E
- Country: Hungary
- County: Nógrád

Government
  - Mayor: Szabó Gábor (Ind.)

Area
  - Total: 16.04 km^{2} (6.19 sq mi)

Population (2022)
  - Total: 572
  - Density: 40.21/km^{2} (104.1/sq mi)
- Time zone: UTC+1 (CET)
  - Summer (DST): UTC+2 (CEST)
- Postal code: 3134
- Area code: 32

Piliny is a village in Nógrád county, Hungary.
