= Szécsényfelfalu =

- Village (község)
- Coat of arms

- Location of Nograd County in Hungary

- Location of Szécsénke in Hungary
- Coordinates: 48°08′45″N 19°34′05″E
- Country: Hungary
- Region: Northern Hungary
- County: Nógrád County
- Subregion: Szécsény

Government
  - Mayor: Keresztes Imre

Area
  - Total: 8.22 km^{2} (3.17 sq mi)

Population (1 Jan. 2015)
  - Total: 390
  - Density: 47/km^{2} (120/sq mi)
- Time zone: UTC+1 (CET)
  - Summer (DST): UTC+2 (CEST)
- Postal code: 3135
- Area code: 32
- Website: http://szecsenyfelfalu.hu/

Szécsényfelfalu is a village in Nógrád County, Northern Hungary Region, Hungary.
