= Ludányhalászi =

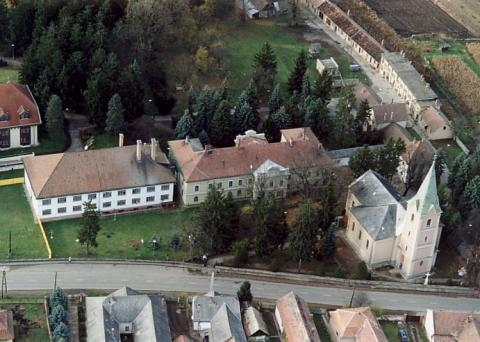
- The Ráday palace and Church from above

- Coat of arms

- Location of Ludányhalászi
- Coordinates: 48.13318°N 19.52281°E
- Country: Hungary
- County: Nógrád
- Subregion: Szécsényi

Area
  - Total: 21.20 km^{2} (8.19 sq mi)

Population (2001)
  - Total: 1,635
  - Density: 77.12/km^{2} (199.7/sq mi)
- Time zone: UTC+1 (CET)
  - Summer (DST): UTC+2 (CEST)
- Postal code: 3188
- Area code: 32

Ludányhalászi is a village in Nógrád county, Hungary. It is the longest village in Central Europe.
