= Cserhát =

Mountain range in Hungary

Coordinates: 47°55′N 19°30′E

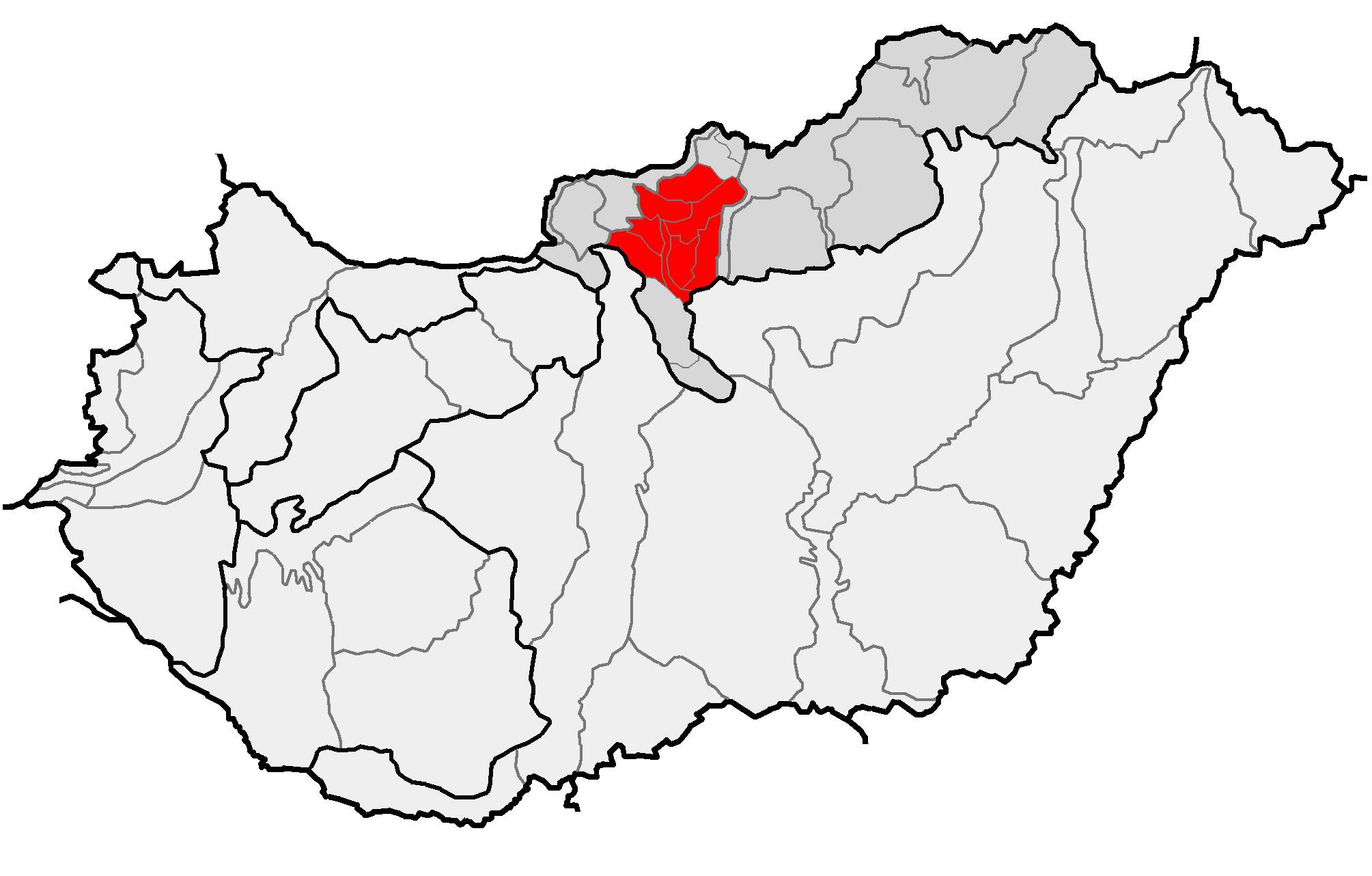
Location of the Cserhát Mountains proper within physical subdivisions of Hungary

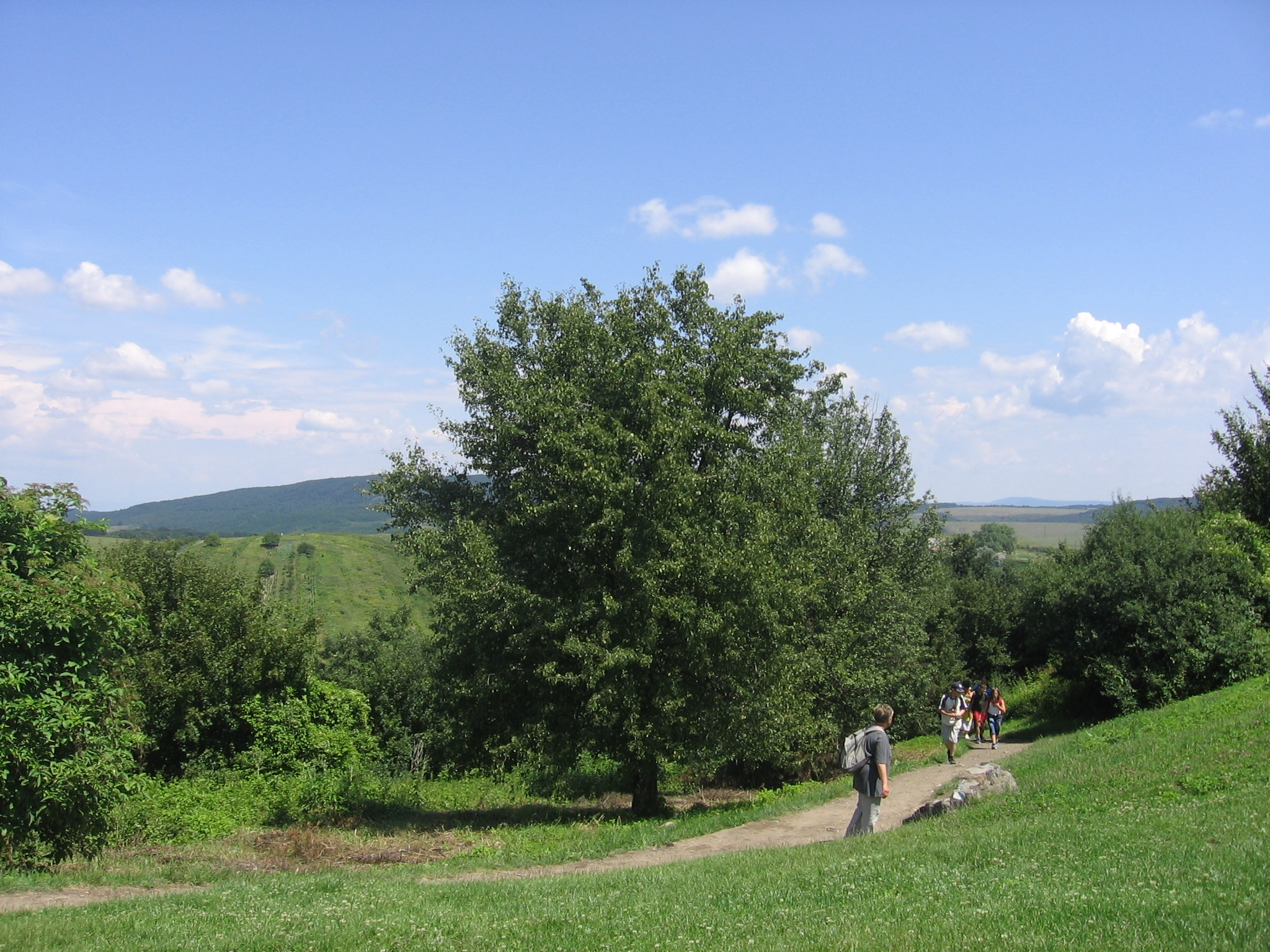
Cserhát Mountains near the ethnographic village of Hollókő

Cserhát ([ˈtʃɛrhaːt]) is a mountain range in Hungary, part of the North Hungarian Mountains. It is divided between Pest and Nógrád counties. Its highest point is the Karancs with an elevation of 729 metres above sea level.

Cserhát stretches from Cserhátalja to the valley of the Ipoly (Slovak: Ipeľ) river. Its central part is mountainous, covered with forests, while its southern and northern parts are hilly.

Architecturally, the territory is rich in castles. Hollókő, an ethnographic village, located here, was inscribed as a UNESCO World Heritage Site in 1987.

== See also ==
- Geography of Hungary
- North Hungarian Mountains
