= Nógrád County 2nd constituency =

Hungarian national legislative constituency

Nógrád County 2nd constituency (Balassagyarmat)
- Constituency for the National Assembly
- Location of Nógrád county 02 within Nógrád county

- Location of Nógrád county within Hungary
- County: Nógrád
- Electorate: 79,088 (2018)
- Major settlements: Balassagyarmat

Current constituency
- Created: 2011
- Party: Fidesz–KDNP
- Member: Mihály Balla
- Created from: Constituency no. 4; Constituency no. 3; Constituency no. 2
- Elected: 2014, 2018, 2022, 2026

The 2nd constituency of Nógrád County (Hungarian: Nógrád megyei 02. számú országgyűlési egyéni választókerület) is one of the single member constituencies of the National Assembly, the national legislature of Hungary. The constituency standard abbreviation: Nógrád 02. OEVK.

Since 2014, it has been represented by Mihály Balla of the Fidesz–KDNP party alliance.

== Geography ==
The 2nd constituency is located in western part of Nógrád County.

=== List of municipalities ===
The constituency includes the following municipalities:

1. Alsópetény
2. Balassagyarmat
3. Bánk
4. Becske
5. Bér
6. Bercel
7. Berkenye
8. Borsosberény
9. Cserháthaláp
10. Cserhátsurány
11. Csesztve
12. Csitár
13. Debercsény
14. Dejtár
15. Diósjenő
16. Drégelypalánk
17. Egyházasgerge
18. Endrefalva
19. Erdőkürt
20. Erdőtarcsa
21. Érsekvadkert
22. Etes
23. Felsőpetény
24. Galgaguta
25. Herencsény
26. Hont
27. Horpács
28. Hugyag
29. Iliny
30. Ipolyszög
31. Ipolytarnóc
32. Ipolyvece
33. Kálló
34. Karancsalja
35. Karancsberény
36. Karancskeszi
37. Karancslapujtő
38. Karancsság
39. Keszeg
40. Kétbodony
41. Kisecset
42. Legénd
43. Litke
44. Ludányhalászi
45. Magyargéc
46. Magyarnándor
47. Mihálygerge
48. Mohora
49. Nagylóc
50. Nagyoroszi
51. Nézsa
52. Nógrád
53. Nógrádkövesd
54. Nógrádmarcal
55. Nógrádmegyer
56. Nógrádsáp
57. Nógrádsipek
58. Nógrádszakál
59. Nőtincs
60. Őrhalom
61. Ősagárd
62. Patak
63. Patvarc
64. Piliny
65. Pusztaberki
66. Rétság
67. Rimóc
68. Romhány
69. Ságújfalu
70. Szalmatercs
71. Szanda
72. Szátok
73. Szécsénke
74. Szécsény
75. Szécsényfelfalu
76. Szendehely
77. Szente
78. Szirák
79. Szügy
80. Terény
81. Tereske
82. Tolmács
83. Vanyarc
84. Varsány

== History ==
The current 2nd constituency of Nógrád County was created in 2011 and contains the pre-2011 4th constituency and part of the pre-2011 3rd and 2nd constituencies of Nógrád County. Its borders have not changed since its creation.

== Members ==
The constituency was first represented by Mihály Balla of the Fidesz from 2014, and he was re-elected in 2018, 2022, and 2026.

Election	Member	Party	%
2014	Mihály Balla	Fidesz	48.8
2018	Mihály Balla	Fidesz	54.3
2022	Mihály Balla	Fidesz	60.1
2026	Mihály Balla	Fidesz	44.58
