= Balassagyarmat District =

Balassagyarmat District Balassagyarmati járás
- District
- Flag Coat of arms

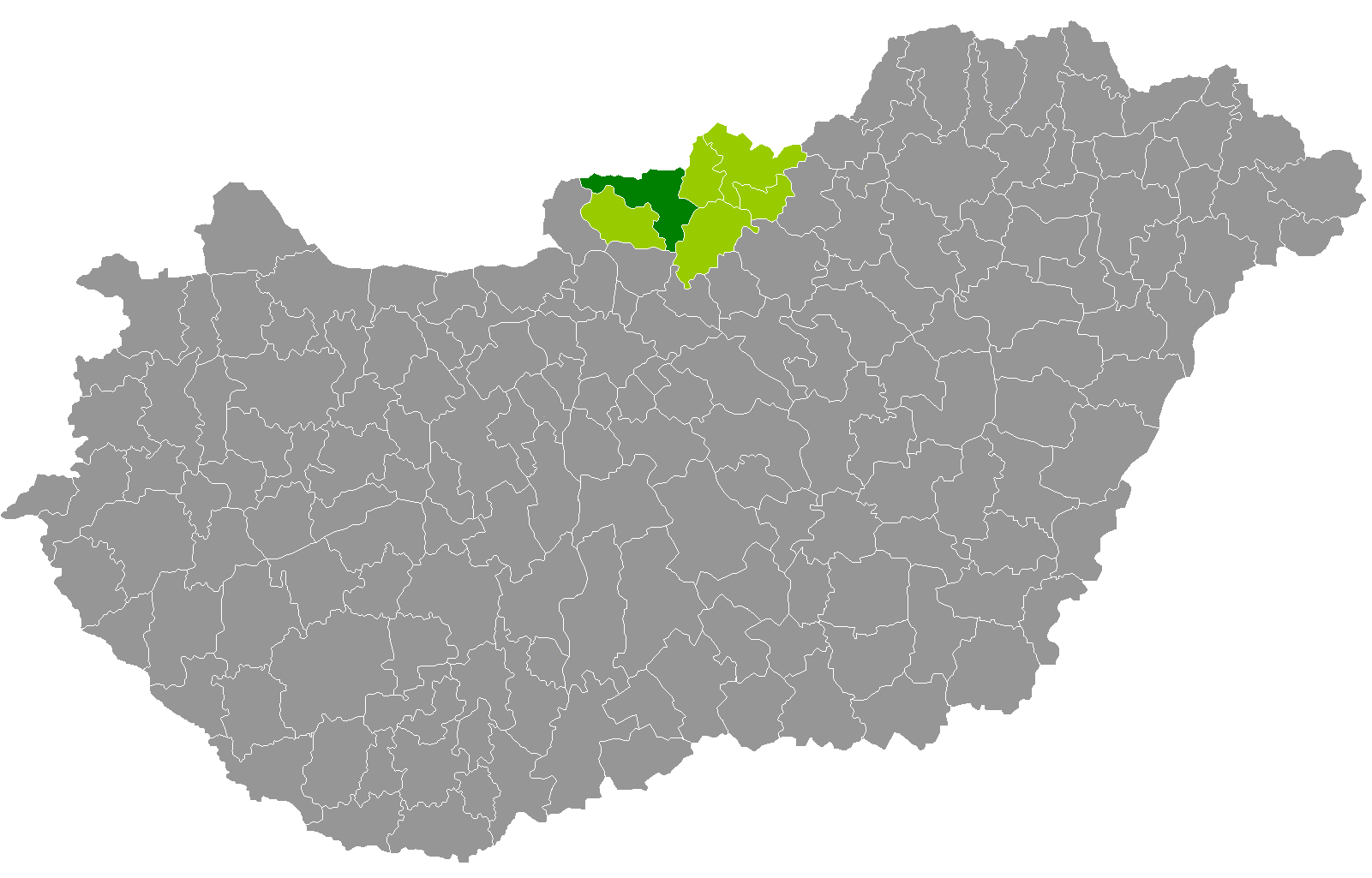
- Balassagyarmat District within Hungary and Nógrád County.
- Country: Hungary
- County: Nógrád
- District seat: Balassagyarmat

Area
  - Total: 532.94 km^{2} (205.77 sq mi)
  - Rank: 2nd in Nógrád

Population (2011 census)
  - Total: 40,326
  - Rank: 2nd in Nógrád
  - Density: 76/km^{2} (200/sq mi)

Balassagyarmat (Hungarian: Balassagyarmati járás) is a district in north-western part of Nógrád County. Balassagyarmat is also the town where the district seat is found. The district is located in the Northern Hungary statistical region.

== Geography ==
Balassagyarmat District borders with the Slovak regions of Nitra and Banská Bystrica to the north, Szécsény District and Pásztó District to the east, Vác District (Pest County) to the south, Rétság District to the southwest, Szob District (Pest County) to the west. The number of the inhabited places in Balassagyarmat District is 29.

== Municipalities ==
The district has one town (bolded) and 28 villages. (ordered by population, as of 1 January 2013)

- **Balassagyarmat** (16,055) – district seat
- Becske (549)
- Bercel (2,088)
- Cserháthaláp (359)
- Cserhátsurány (837)
- Csesztve (327)
- Csitár (404)
- Debercsény (73)
- Dejtár (1,377)
- Drégelypalánk (1,491)
- Érsekvadkert (3,574)
- Galgaguta (645)
- Herencsény (593)
- Hont (475)
- Hugyag (856)
- Iliny (157)
- Ipolyszög (649)
- Ipolyvece (773)
- Magyarnándor (1,122)
- Mohora (942)
- Nógrádkövesd (692)
- Nógrádmarcal (556)
- Őrhalom (983)
- Patak (912)
- Patvarc (708)
- Szanda (662)
- Szécsénke (199)
- Szügy (1,391)
- Terény (380)

== Demographics ==
Religion in Balassagyarmat District (2011 census)
1. Catholic Church (61.5%)
2. Greek Catholicism (0.10%)
3. Lutheranism (6.40%)
4. Calvinism (1.70%)
5. Other religions (1.50%)
6. Non-religious (5.10%)
7. Atheists (0.80%)
8. Undeclared (22.9%)

In 2011, it had a population of 40,326 and the population density was 76/km^{2}.

Year	County population	Change
2011	40,326	n/a

=== Ethnicity ===
Besides the Hungarian majority, the main minorities are the Roma (approx. 2,000), Slovak (400) and German (100).

Total population (2011 census): 40,326
Ethnic groups (2011 census): Identified themselves: 37,603 persons:

- Hungarians: 34,861 (93.70%)
- Gypsies: 1,932 (5.19%)
- Slovaks: 380 (1.02%)
- Others and indefinable: 430 (1.14%)

Approx. 2,500 persons in Balassagyarmat District did not declare their ethnic group at the 2011 census.

=== Religion ===
Religious adherence in the county according to 2011 census:

- Catholic – 24,829 (Roman Catholic – 24,781; Greek Catholic – 45);
- Evangelical – 2,561;
- Reformed – 681;
- other religions – 610;
- Non-religious – 2,049;
- Atheism – 335;
- Undeclared – 9,261.

== Gallery ==
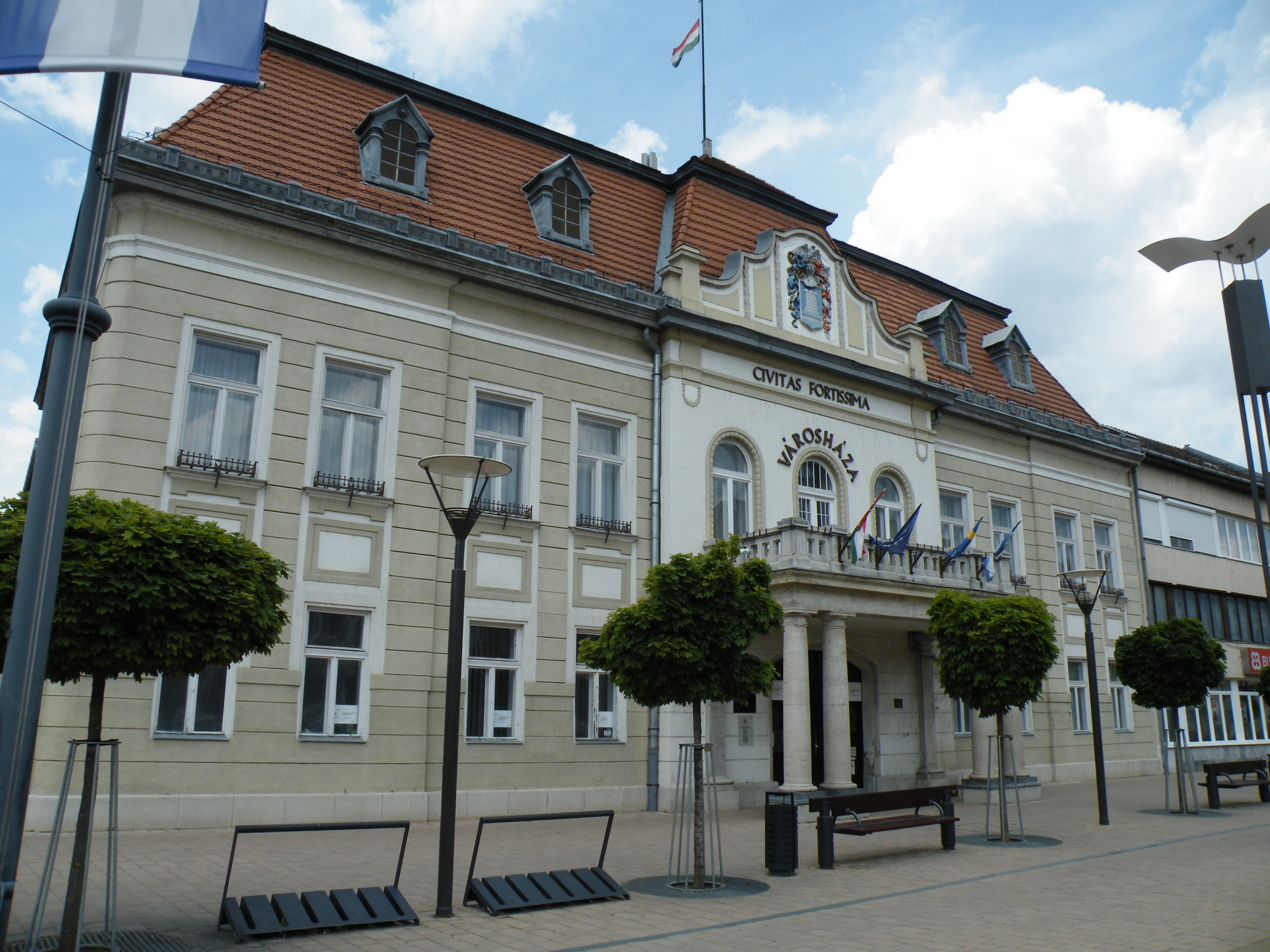
Balassagyarmat, Civitas Fortissima

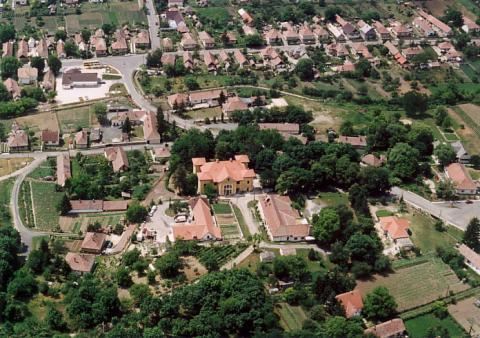
Aerial view of Bercel

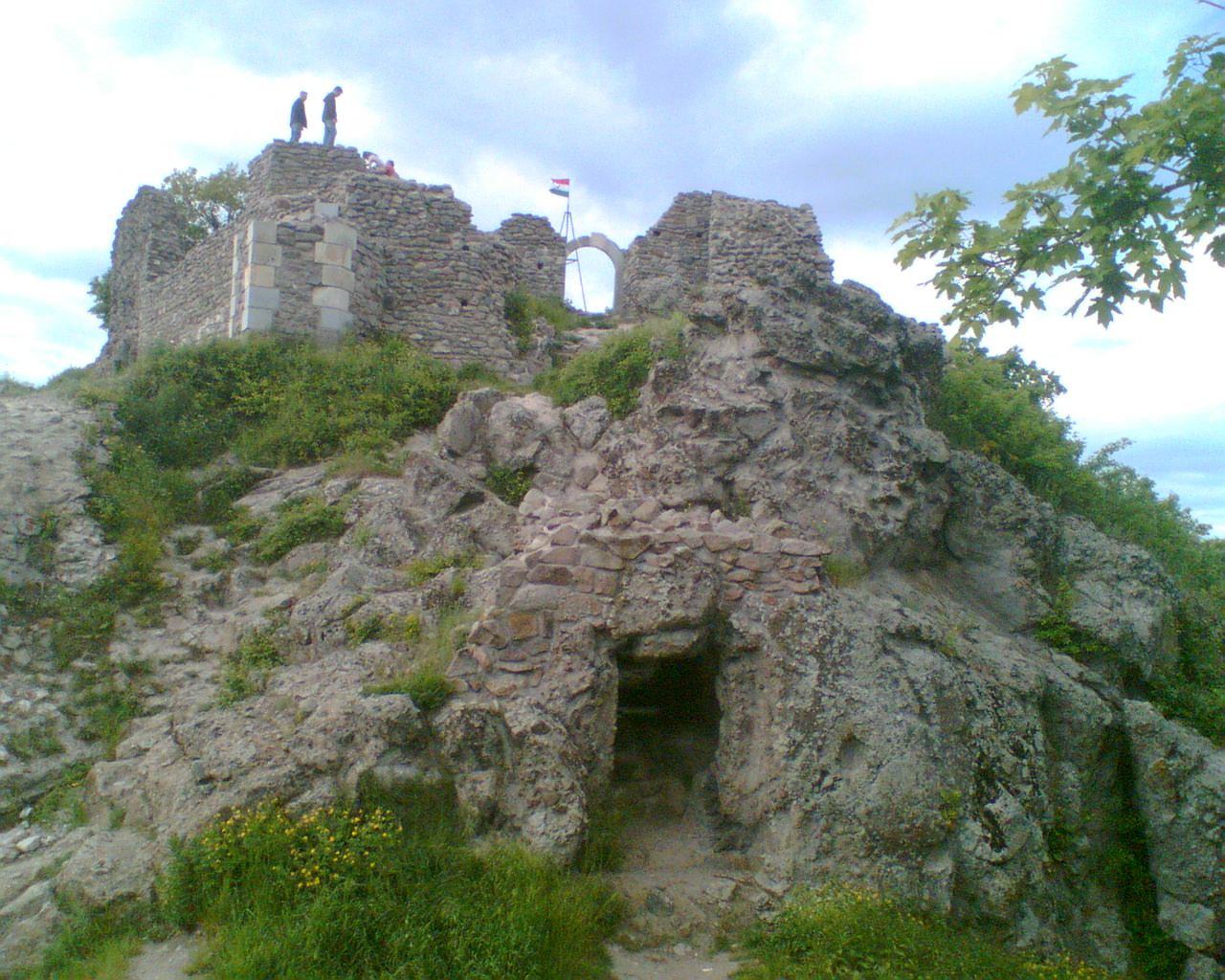
Drégely Castle

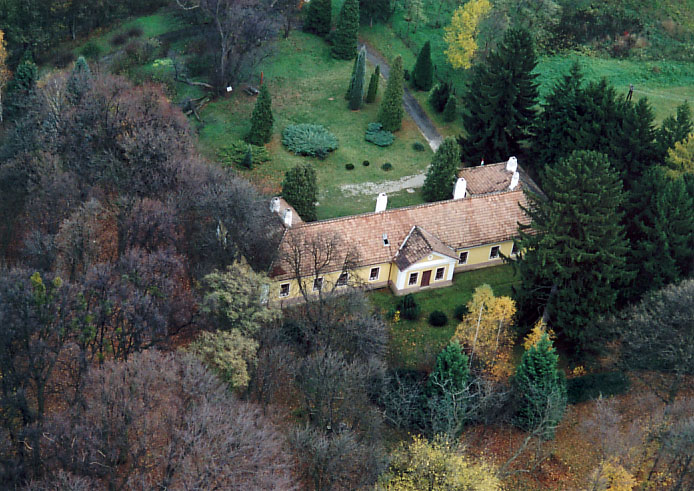
Madách Chateau in Csesztve

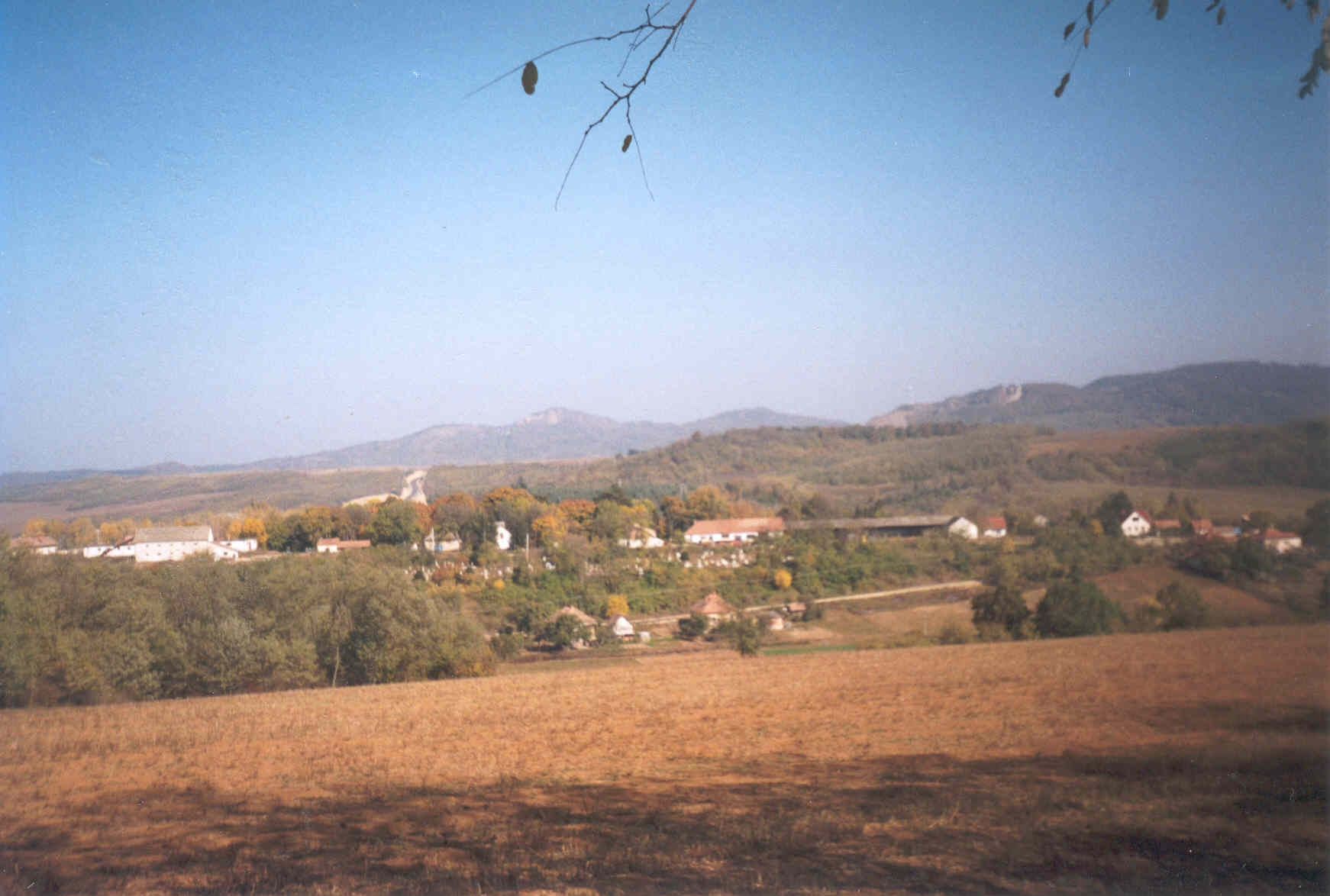
View of Szanda

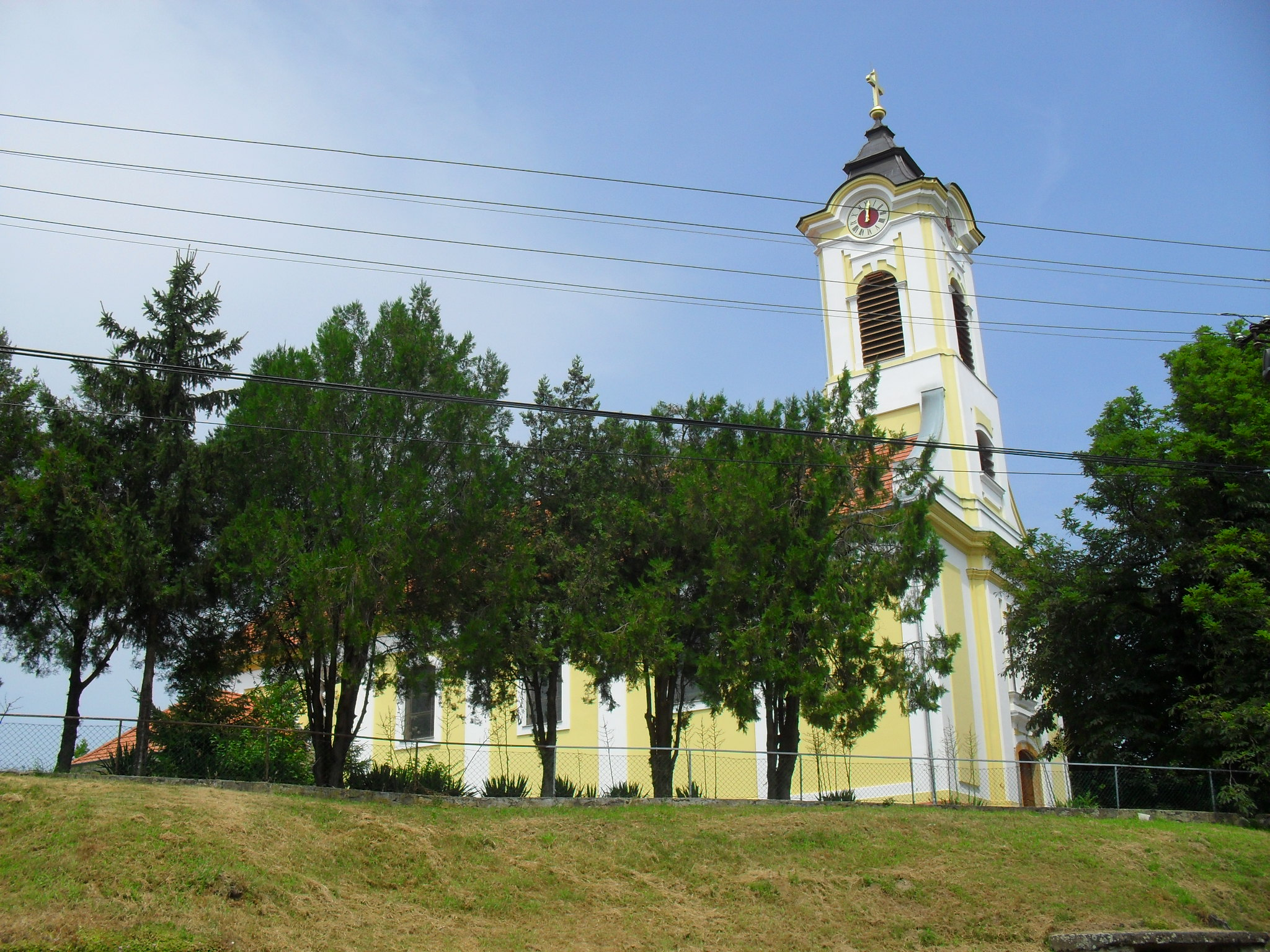
Holy Trinity Church in Patak

== See also ==
- List of cities and towns of Hungary
