= Árpád Urbán =

Hungarian teacher and politician (1942–2005)

Member of the National Assembly
- In office 15 May 2002 – 26 November 2005
- In office 28 June 1994 – 17 June 1998

Personal details
- Born: 26 January 1942 Ipolyvece, Hungary
- Died: 26 November 2005 (aged 63) Balassagyarmat, Hungary
- Party: MSZMP (1964–1989); MSZP (1989–2005)
- Profession: Teacher, politician

Árpád Urbán (26 January 1942 – 26 November 2005) was a Hungarian teacher and politician. He was a member of the National Assembly for Balassagyarmat (Nógrád County Constituency IV) between 1994 and 1998. He was also MP from the Hungarian Socialist Party's Nógrád County Regional List from 2002 until his death.

== Biography ==
Urbán was born in Ipolyvece on 26 January 1942. He finished his secondary studies at the Bálint Balassi Secondary Grammar School of Balassagyarmat in 1960. He worked as a health inspector in the local district for a year. He taught in the Francis II Rákóczi Primary School between 1965 and 1970, while graduated from the Teacher Training College of Eger in 1967. He served as teacher and deputy principal of the György Dózsa Primary School since 1970 and as principal between 1990 and 1994. He earned a degree at Budapest University of Technology and Economics in 1995. After 1998 he taught in Őrhalom.

Beside teaching activity, Urbán was a football referee between 1964 and 1985. He had been a full international referee for FIFA since 1984.

=== Political career ===
He joined Hungarian Socialist Workers' Party (MSZMP) in 1964. He was a founding member of the Hungarian Socialist Party (MSZP) since October 1989. He became a member of the party's Nógrád County coordination branch and the National Board in 1993. He was elected MP for Balassagyarmat during the 1994 parliamentary election. He was a member of the Committee on Education, Science, Youth and Sports from 28 June 1994 to 17 June 1998. He lost his parliamentary seat in the 1998 general election. Nevertheless, he was elected a member of the General Assembly of Balassagyarmat in the 1998 local elections.

Urbán gained a parliamentary seat from the Socialist party's Nógrád County Regional List in the 2002 parliamentary election. He functioned as a member of the Committee on Youth and Sports since 15 May 2002 and Committee on Human Rights, Minority and Religious Affairs since 4 June 2002.

== Death ==
Árpád Urbán died in a hunting accident near Balassagyarmat and Érsekvadkert on 26 November 2005, when his 73-year-old elder brother accidentally mortally wounded him in the chest by shotgun. Urbán later died of his injuries in hospital at Balassagyarmat.
