= Varsány =

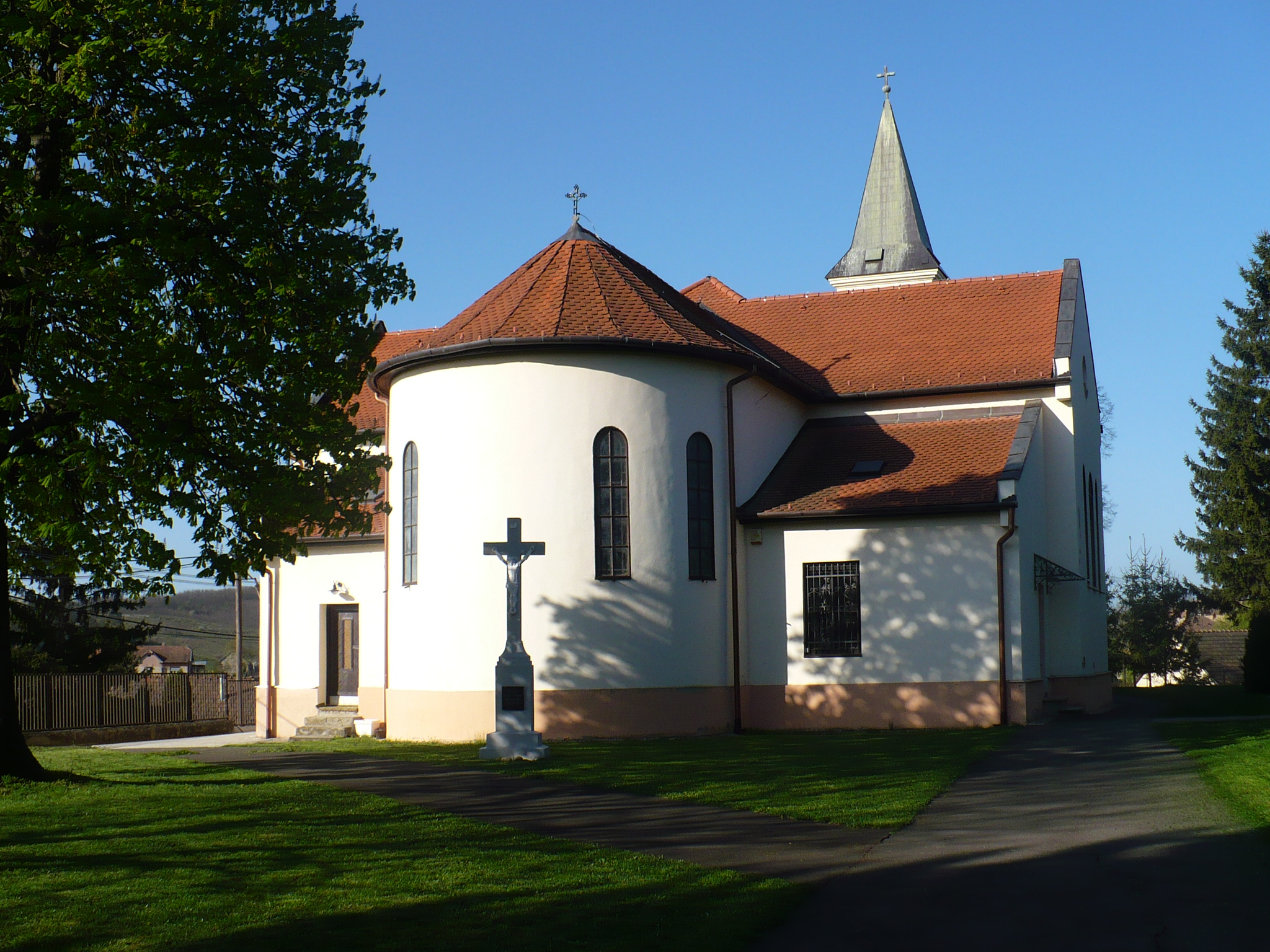
- Church of Saint Michael

- Coat of arms

- Location within Hungary
- Coordinates: 48°02′22.97″N 19°29′21.31″E
- Country: Hungary
- County: Nógrád

Area
  - Total: 25.58 km^{2} (9.88 sq mi)

Population (2025)
  - Total: 1,480
  - Density: 65.87/km^{2} (170.6/sq mi)
- Time zone: UTC+1 (CET)
  - Summer (DST): UTC+2 (CEST)
- Postal code: 3178
- Area code: 32
- Website: http://www.varsany.hu/

Varsány is a village in Nógrád County, Hungary with 1,480 inhabitants (2025).

== Location ==
The village is located in Nógrád county, approximately 100 kilometres northeast from Budapest, the capital of Hungary and 21 kilometres from Hollókő. Varsány is bordered by Szécsény on the north, by Rimóc on the east, by Nógrádsipek on the south and by Csitár and Iliny on the west. Nearby this village there is Darázsdói-patak.

== Sights ==
- Saint Michael Roman Catholic Church (Szent Mihály Római Katolikus Templom)
- Chapel of Patrona Hungariae (Magyarok Nagyasszonya-kápolna)
- Calvary from the Church to Cemetery across Varsány
- Villagemuseum (Falumúzeum)
- Tábpuszta

== Twin towns – sister cities ==
Varsány is twinned with:

- Radzovce, Slovakia
- Otmuchów, Poland
- Sedziejowice, Poland
- Crăciunel, Romania
- Palić, Serbia
