= Vrbovka =

Vrbovka Ipolyvarbó
- Municipality
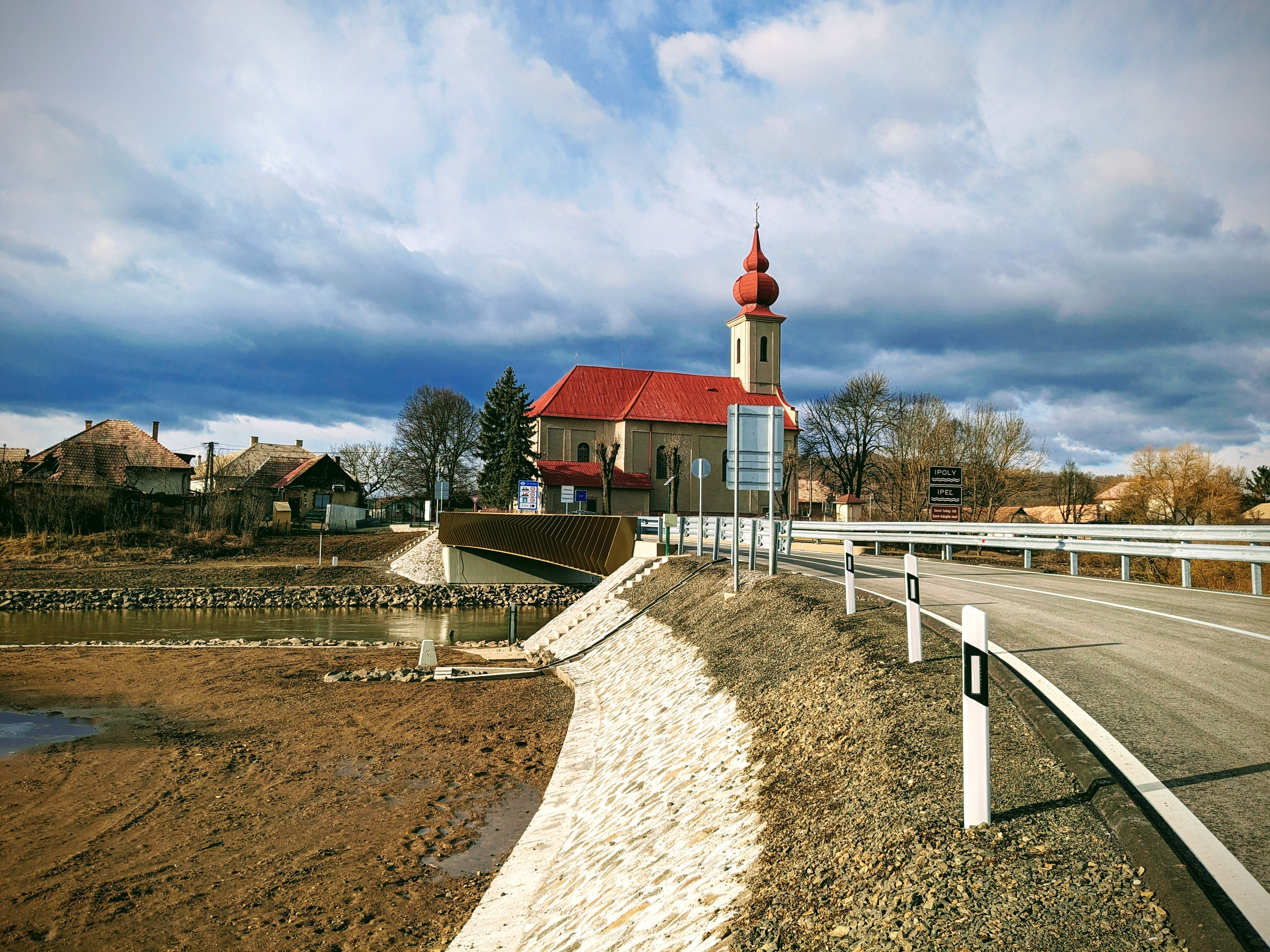
- Cross-border bridge with the parish church

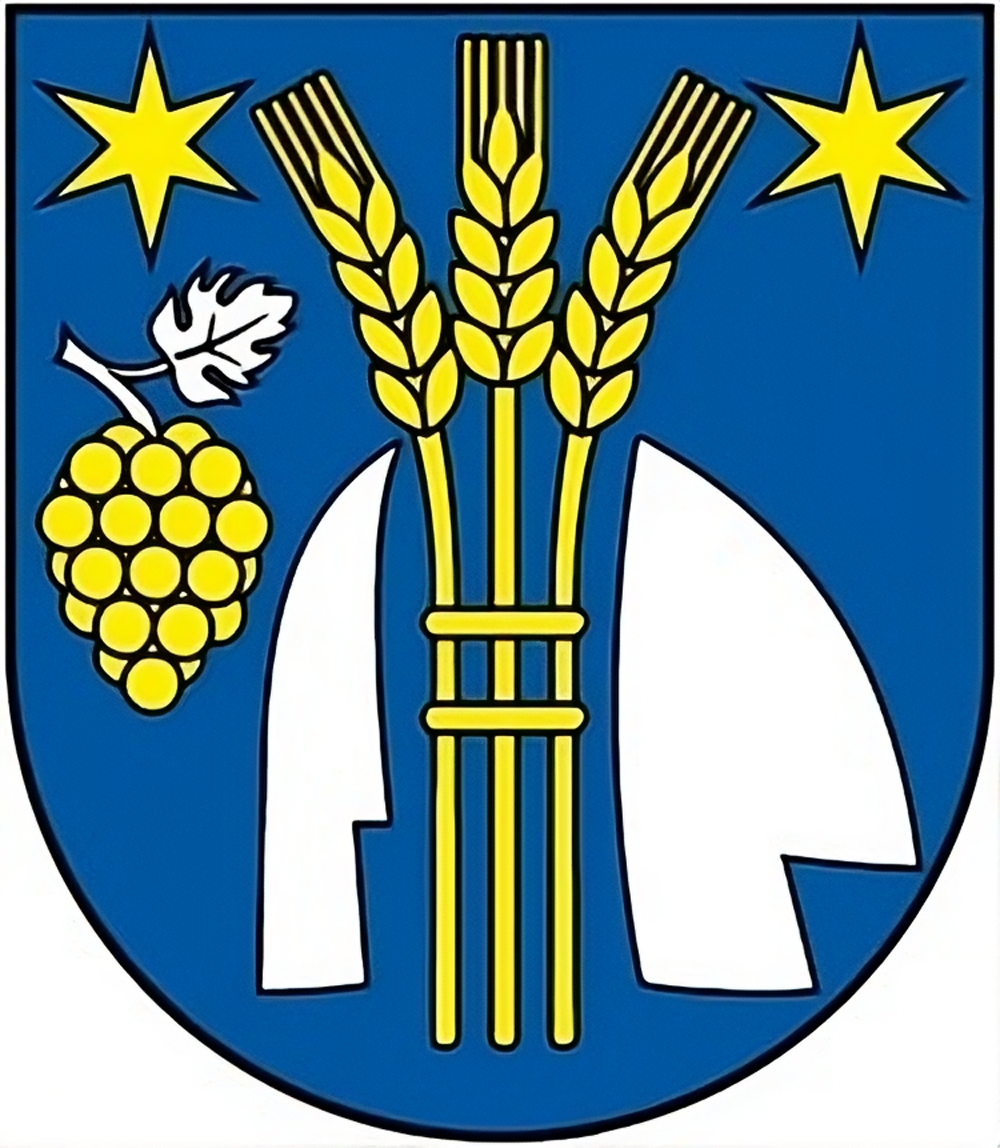
- Flag Coat of arms

- Location of Vrbovka in the Banská Bystrica Region Location of Vrbovka in Slovakia
- Coordinates: 48.09°N 19.41°E
- Country: Slovakia
- Region: Banská Bystrica Region
- District: Veľký Krtíš District
- First mentioned: 1327

Government
  - Mayor: Marcel Fagyas

Area
  - Total: 10.59 km^{2} (4.09 sq mi)
- Elevation: 151 m (495 ft)

Population (2025)
  - Total: 307
- Time zone: UTC+1 (CET)
  - Summer (DST): UTC+2 (CEST)
- Postal code: 991 31
- Area code: +421 47
- Vehicle registration plate (until 2022): VK
- Website: www.vrbovka.sk

Vrbovka (Hungarian: Ipolyvarbó) is a village in southern Slovakia by the Ipeľ/Ipoly river very close to the Hungarian border. The nearest urban centre in Slovakia is Veľký Krtíš which also serves as a district seat. On the Hungarian side Szécsény and Balassagyarmat are the nearest towns. With the opening of the cross-border bridge in 2024, Vrbovka has once again become a border crossing point to Hungary, but thanks to the Schengen Union, the border can be crossed freely.

== Geography ==
The municipality lies at an altitude of 151 metres (495 ft) and covers an area of 10.59 km^{2} (4.09 sq mi) (2025).

== History ==
The first written reference is from 1327 as Vrbou, the name comes from the Slavic "vrba" meaning willow. The place name clearly refers to the natural environment, as many willow trees still grow on the wide flood plain of Ipoly/Ipeľ river.

There is a cross-border bridge above the Ipoly/Ipeľ river between Slovakia and Hungary. The Szent-Iványi híd/Szent-Iványiho most was built in 2023 replacing a temporary wooden bridge that served pedestrian and bicycle traffic since 2007. Previous bridges connected Ipolyvarbó and Őrhalom from the 19th century until the early 1950s when the border was closed. The Roman Catholic Church of the Holiest Trinity in Vrbovka was built in 1798.

== Population ==
Population statistic (10 years)
Year	1995	2005	2015	2025
Count	443	397	348	307
Difference		−10.38%	−12.34%	−11.78%

Population statistic
Year	2024	2025
Count	315	307
Difference		−2.53%

It has a population of 307 people (31 December 2025).

=== Ethnicity ===
Census 2021 (1+ %)
Ethnicity	Number	Fraction
Hungarian	241	73.25%
Slovak	101	30.69%
Not found out	12	3.64%
Total	329	

In year 2021 was 329 people by ethnicity 241 as Hungarian, 101 as Slovak, 12 as Not found out and 1 as Jewish.

Note on population: The difference values of population numbers in the table "Population statistic" and in the sections "Ethnicity" & "Religion" is caused by the use of various statistical methods.

=== Religion ===
Census 2021 (1+ %)
Religion	Number	Fraction
Roman Catholic Church	296	89.97%
None	18	5.47%
Evangelical Church	7	2.13%
Not found out	6	1.82%
Total	329	

In year 2021 was 329 people by religion 296 from Roman Catholic Church, 18 from None, 7 from Evangelical Church, 6 from Not found out, 1 from Old Catholic Church and 1 from Other and not ascertained christian church.
