= Mihály Balla =

Hungarian politician

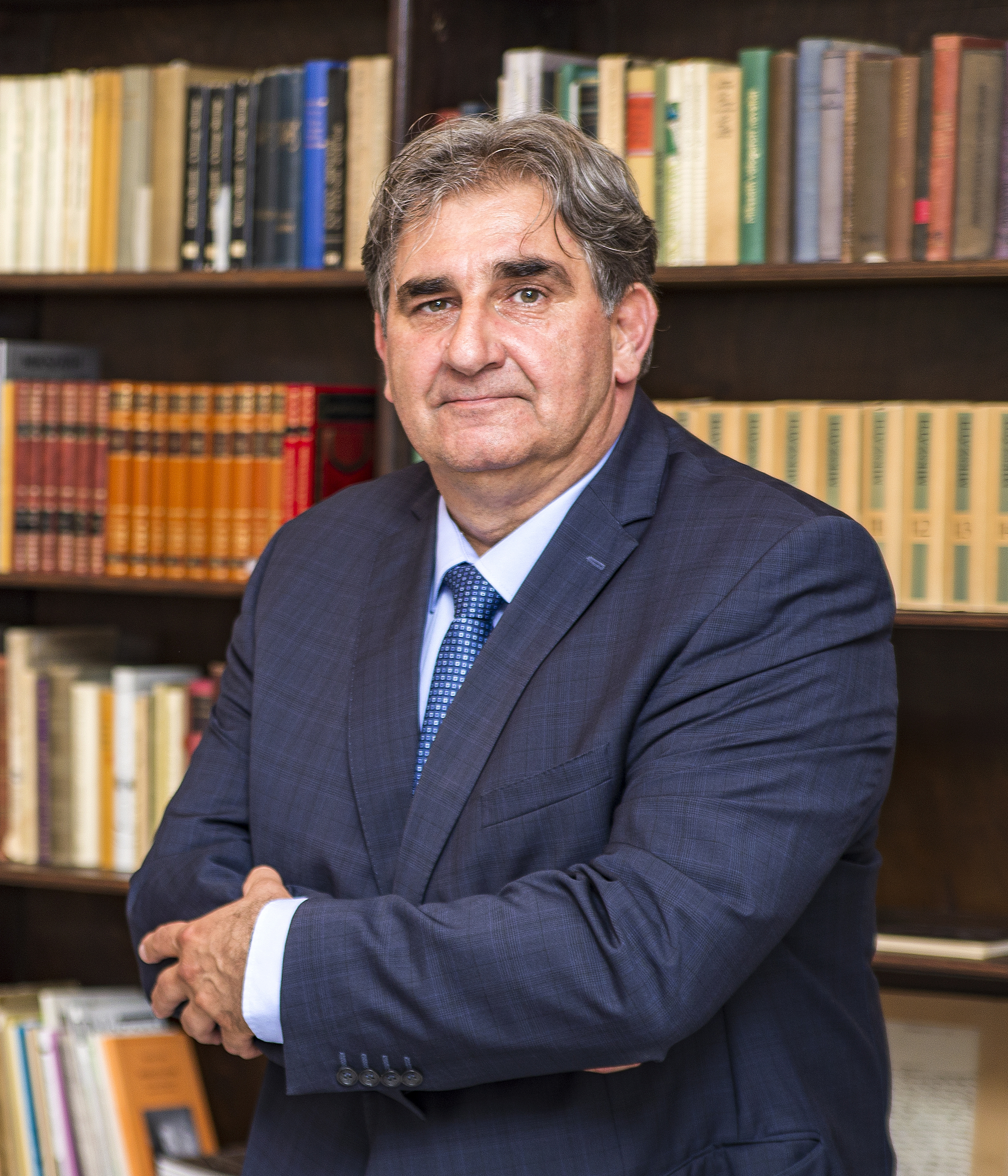

Member of the National Assembly
- Incumbent
- Assumed office 18 June 1998

Personal details
- Born: 21 May 1965 (age 60) Nyíregyháza, Hungary
- Party: Fidesz
- Profession: politician

Mihály Balla (born 21 May 1965) is a Hungarian politician, member of the National Assembly (MP) for Balassagyarmat, Nógrád County (Constituency IV then II) since 1998. He is one of the deputy leaders of the Fidesz parliamentary group since 8 June 2010. He served as Chairman of the Parliamentary Committee on Foreign Affairs from 2010 to 2014.

== Career ==
Balla graduated as a teacher of Hungarian and Russian from Bessenyei György Teacher Training College in 1987. He took his advanced degree in Hungarian language and literature from University of Miskolc in 1998. He has been a member of the Board of Trustees of the Foundation for the Development of Balassagyarmat since 1998.

He joined to the Fidesz in 1997 and has been Vice President of the Nógrád County Board since 1998. He secured a seat in Parliament in the 1998 parliamentary elections as an individual candidate (representing Constituency IV, Balassagyarmat, Nógrád County). When Fidesz developed its organisational structure in the course of 2003 and 2004 he was appointed to the post of chairman of the Balassagyarmat Constituency.

He led the Hungarian parliamentary group delegated to the Organization for Security and Co-operation in Europe (OSCE) and the Hungarian parliamentary delegation to NATO Parliamentary Assembly from 1998 to 2002. As deputy chairman of the Foreign Affairs Committee he headed the foreign and security policy cabinet of the parliamentary group of Fidesz from 1999. He had been deputy parliamentary faction leader for Fidesz from 28 April 2000 to 2002. As an individual candidate he secured incumbency as the MP for his Balassagyarmat Constituency in the second round of the parliamentary elections in April 2002. Once Parliament was established he was chairman of the Foreign Affairs Committee for a brief period, then worked as a member, and had been deputy chairman since June 2003. He ran in the local elections in October 2002 and secured a seat in the Nógrád County Assembly as well as in the body of representatives of Érsekvadkert. He was a delegate to the European Parliament from the autumn of 2002 to the summer of 2004. He served as Deputy Chairman of the Hungarian delegation to the Interparliamentary Union from 2008 to 2014. He was elected head of the delegation on 10 June 2014.

He could repeat his success in 2006 2010, 2014 and 2018 as Member of Parliament for Balassagyarmat. Balla was appointed Chairman of the Parliamentary Committee on Foreign Affairs on 14 May 2010, holding the position until June 2014.
