= Ipolyszög =

- Village (község)
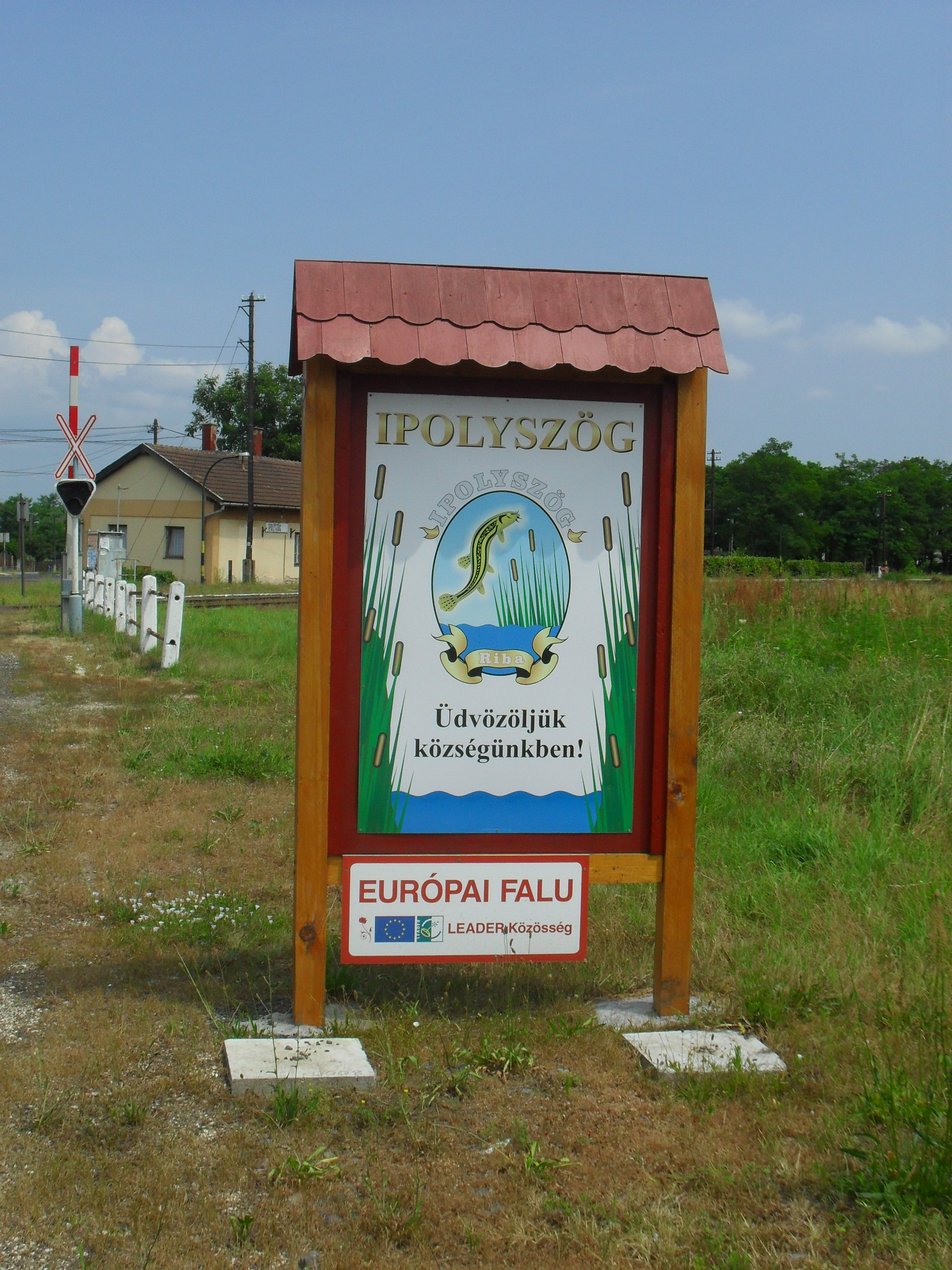

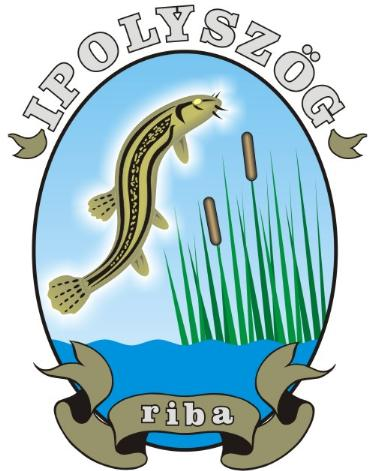
- Coat of arms

- Location of Nograd County in Hungary

- Location of Ipolyszög in Hungary
- Coordinates: 48°03′15″N 19°13′42″E
- Country: Hungary
- Region: Northern Hungary
- County: Nógrád County
- District: Balassagyarmat

Government
  - Mayor: Kárdási Jánosné (Ind.)

Area
  - Total: 6.11 km^{2} (2.36 sq mi)

Population (1 Jan. 2015)
  - Total: 665
  - Density: 102/km^{2} (260/sq mi)
- Time zone: UTC+1 (CET)
  - Summer (DST): UTC+2 (CEST)
- Postal code: 2660
- Area code: 35
- Website: https://ipolyszog.hu/

Ipolyszög (Slovak: Ryba) is a village in Nógrád County, Northern Hungary Region, Hungary.
