= Debraď =

Village and municipality in Slovakia

Debraď Debrőd
- Municipality
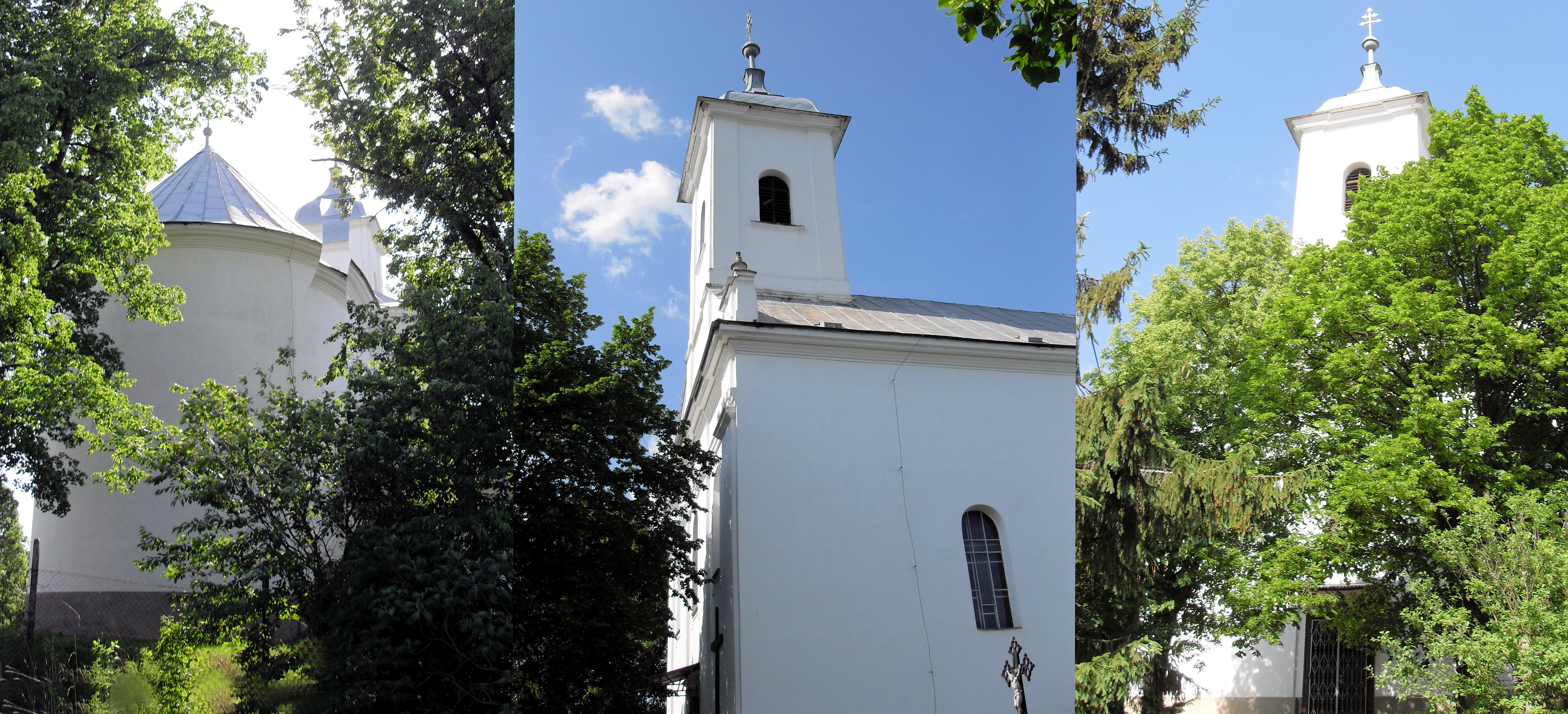

- Flag

- Location of Debraď in the Košice Region Location of Debraď in Slovakia
- Coordinates: 48.65°N 20.98°E
- Country: Slovakia
- Region: Košice Region
- District: Košice-okolie District
- First mentioned: 1255

Area
  - Total: 23.79 km^{2} (9.19 sq mi)
- Elevation: 265 m (869 ft)

Population (2025)
  - Total: 400
- Time zone: UTC+1 (CET)
  - Summer (DST): UTC+2 (CEST)
- Postal code: 442 3
- Area code: +421 55
- Vehicle registration plate (until 2022): KS
- Website: debrad.sk

Debraď (Hungarian: Debrőd) is a village and municipality in Košice-okolie District in the Košice Region of eastern Slovakia.

== Geography ==
The municipality lies at an altitude of 265 metres (869 ft) and covers an area of 23.79 km^{2} (9.19 sq mi) (2025).

== Population ==
Population statistic (10 years)
Year	1995	2005	2015	2025
Count	397	372	388	400
Difference		−6.29%	+4.30%	+3.09%

Population statistic
Year	2024	2025
Count	400	400
Difference		+0%

It has a population of 400 people (31 December 2025).

=== Ethnicity ===
Census 2021 (1+%)
Ethnicity	Number	Fraction
Hungarian	254	62.1%
Slovak	149	36.43%
Not found out	43	10.51%
Total	409	

In year 2021 was 409 people by ethnicity 254 as Hungarian, 149 as Slovak, 43 as Not found out, 2 as Czech, 2 as Other, 1 as Rusyn and 1 as Russian.

Note on population: The difference values of population numbers in the table "Population statistic" and in the sections "Ethnicity" & "Religion" is caused by the use of various statistical methods.

=== Religion ===
Census 2021 (1+%)
Religion	Number	Fraction
Roman Catholic Church	301	73.59%
Not found out	49	11.98%
None	27	6.6%
Calvinist Church	17	4.16%
Evangelical Church	5	1.22%
Total	409	

In year 2021 was 409 people by religion 301 from Roman Catholic Church, 49 from Not found out, 27 from None, 17 from Calvinist Church, 5 from Evangelical Church, 4 from Greek Catholic Church, 2 from Eastern Orthodox Church, 2 from Ad hoc movements, 1 from Other and 1 from Buddhism.

== Government ==
The village relies on the tax and district offices and fire brigade at Moldava nad Bodvou. The village relies on the police force of Jasov.

== Transport ==
The nearest railway station is located at Moldava nad Bodvou 9 kilometres away.

== Genealogical resources ==
The records for genealogical research are available at the state archive "Statny Archiv in Kosice, Slovakia".

- Roman Catholic church records (births/marriages/deaths): 1792–1894 (parish A)
- Greek Catholic church records (births/marriages/deaths): 1870–1902 (parish B)
- Reformed church records (births/marriages/deaths): 1727–1904 (parish B)

== See also ==
- List of municipalities and towns in Slovakia
