= Debercsény =

Village and municipality in Hungary

Coordinates: 47°58′N 19°19′E

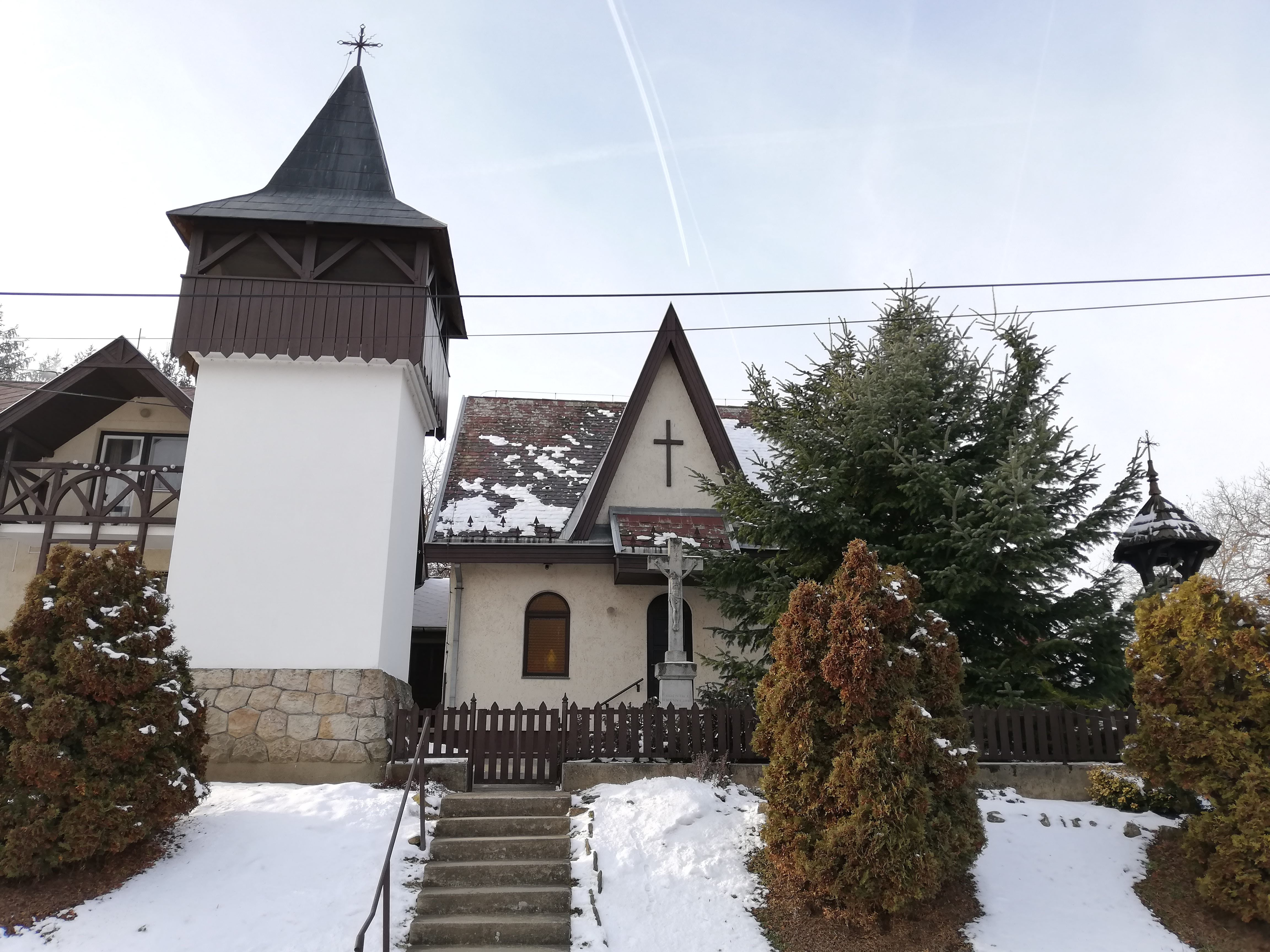
Debercsény, Szent Erzsébet-templom és harangláb

Debercsény is a village and municipality in the comitat of Nógrád, Hungary.

== Etymology ==
The name probably comes from Slavic/Slovak Debrečany (older etymologies were Dobročany, Dobročín, Dobrčín). Old Slavic deber, debra - a valley, a ravine, a pothole. Similar place names can be found in Eastern Slovakia (see e.g. Debraď) where the word has been preserved in dialects until the modern times.

Population by year
Year	Population
1870	148
1880	108
1890	102
1900	115
1910	155
1920	167
1930	183
1941	190
1949	200
1960	222
1970	254
1980	199
1990	153
2001	102
2011	79
