= Herencsény =

Municipality of Hungary

Coordinates: 47°59′N 19°29′E

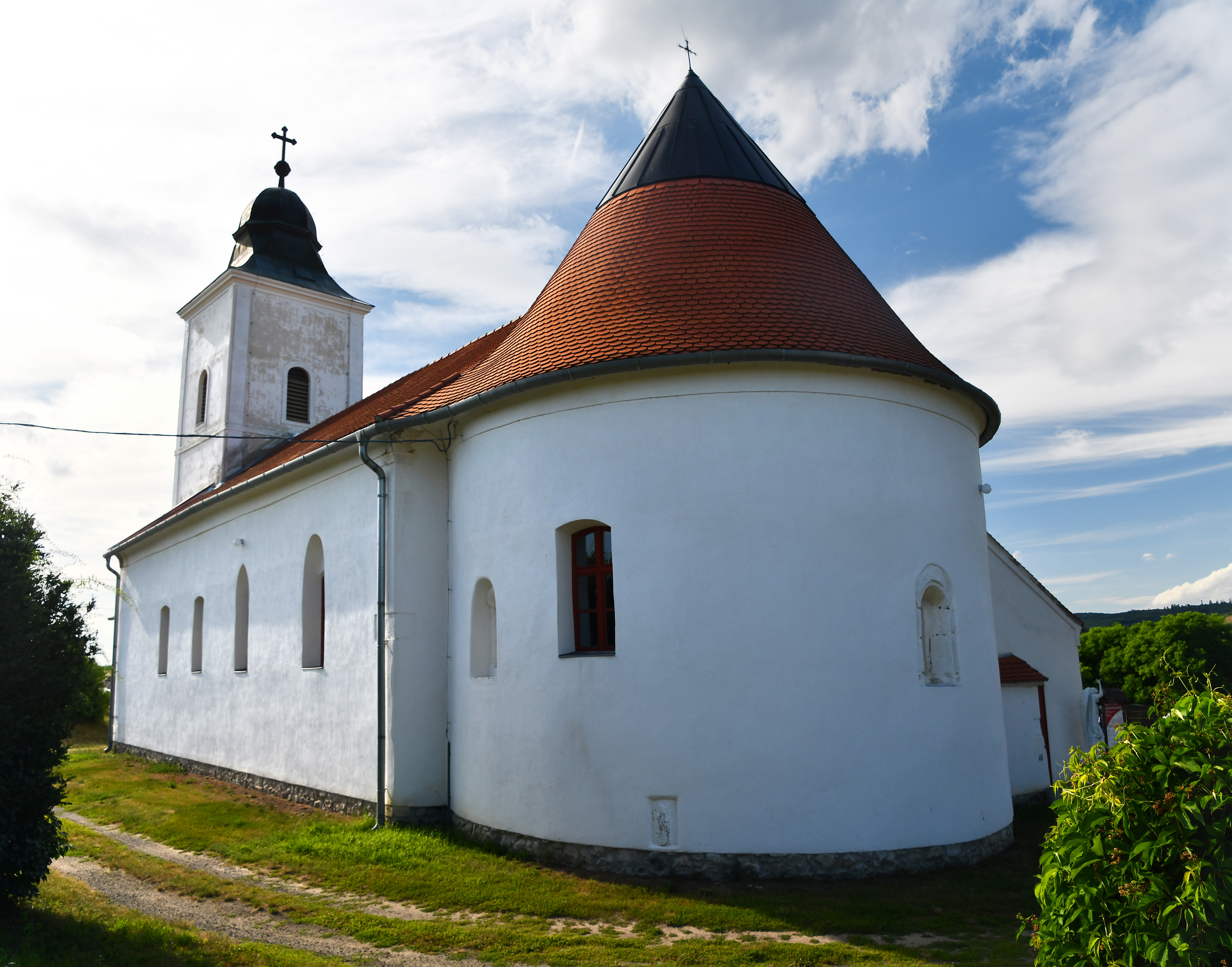

Herencsény is a village and municipality in the comitat of Nógrád, Hungary.

== Etymology ==
The name is of Slavic origin and comes from Slovak Chrěnčany ("chren" - horseradish). See also etymology of Hriňová.
