= Mohora =

- Coat of arms

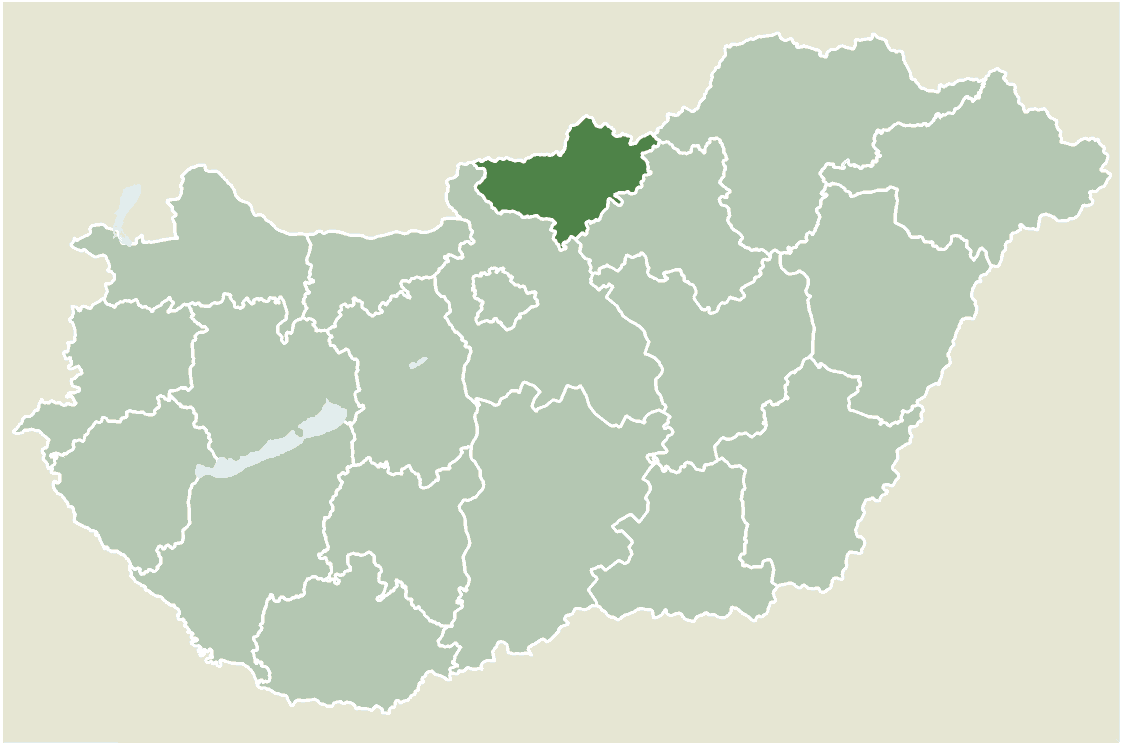
- Location of Nógrád county in Hungary

- Location of Mohora
- Coordinates: 47.99328°N 19.34279°E
- Country: Hungary
- County: Nógrád

Area
  - Total: 15.96 km^{2} (6.16 sq mi)

Population (2004)
  - Total: 1,000
  - Density: 62.65/km^{2} (162.3/sq mi)
- Time zone: UTC+1 (CET)
  - Summer (DST): UTC+2 (CEST)
- Postal code: 2698
- Area code: 35

Mohora is a village in Nógrád county, Hungary.

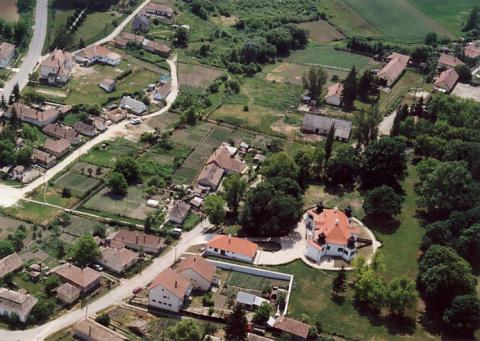
Aerial photography of Mohora
