= Csesztve =

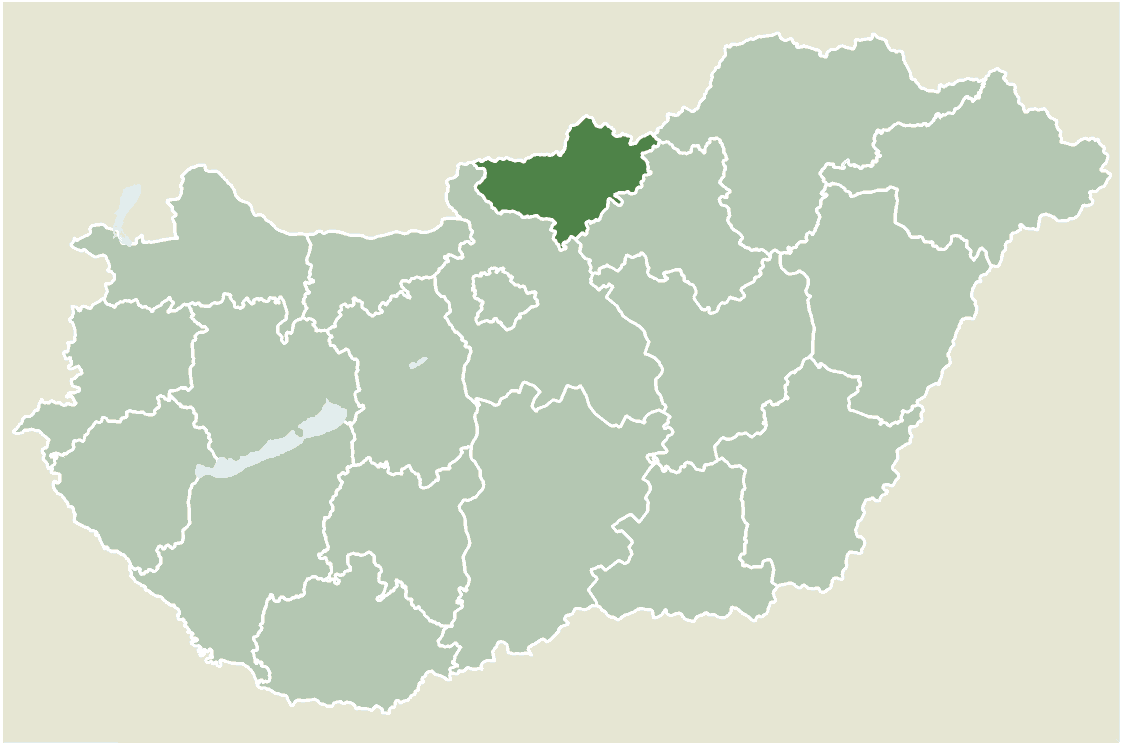
- Location of Nógrád county in Hungary

- Location of Csesztve
- Coordinates: 48.01519°N 19.27757°E
- Country: Hungary
- County: Nógrád

Area
  - Total: 16.25 km^{2} (6.27 sq mi)

Population (2004)
  - Total: 335
  - Density: 20.61/km^{2} (53.4/sq mi)
- Time zone: UTC+1 (CET)
  - Summer (DST): UTC+2 (CEST)
- Postal code: 2678
- Area code: 35

Csesztve (Slovak: Častva) is a village in Nógrád county, Hungary.

== Etymology ==
The name comes from a Slavic personal name Čestovoj, Častovoj. 1255 Chestue, 1339 Chestwe.
