= Cserhátsurány =

Coordinates: 47°59′N 19°26′E

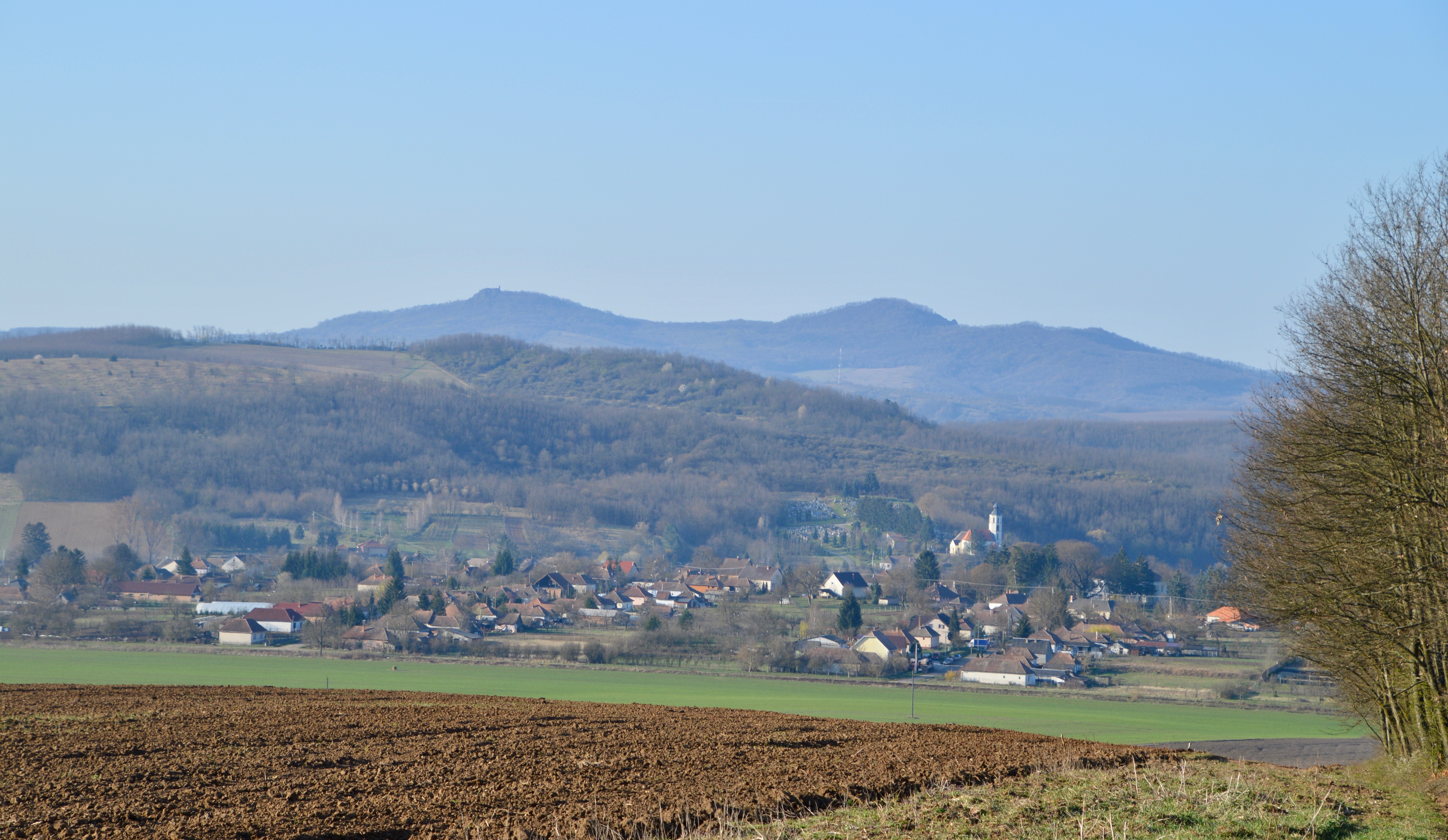

Cserhátsurány is a village and municipality in Nógrád county of Hungary.

Population by year
Year	Population
1870	755
1880	684
1890	698
1900	890
1910	1045
1920	1044
1930	1071
1941	1150
1949	1219
1960	1163
1970	1264
1980	1120
1990	1001
2001	994
2011	877
