= Hugyag =

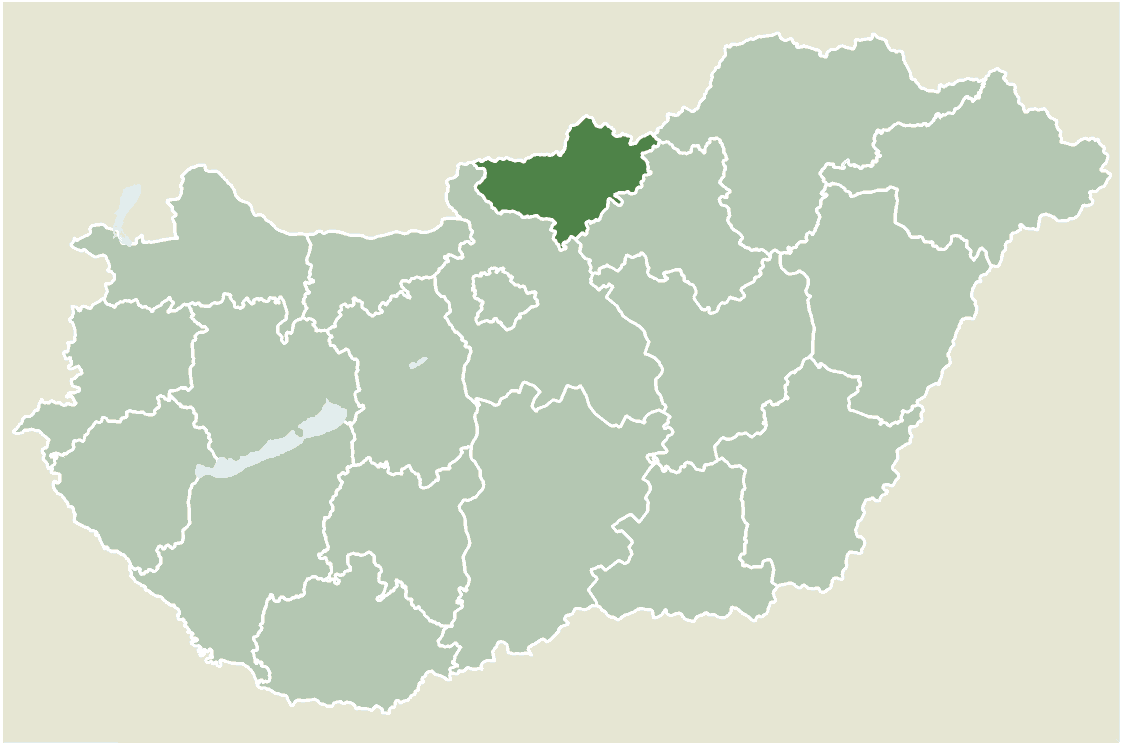
- Location of Nógrád county in Hungary

- Location of Hugyag
- Coordinates: 48.08801°N 19.43080°E
- Country: Hungary
- County: Nógrád

Area
  - Total: 10.91 km^{2} (4.21 sq mi)

Population (2004)
  - Total: 929
  - Density: 85.15/km^{2} (220.5/sq mi)
- Time zone: UTC+1 (CET)
  - Summer (DST): UTC+2 (CEST)
- Postal code: 2672
- Area code: 35

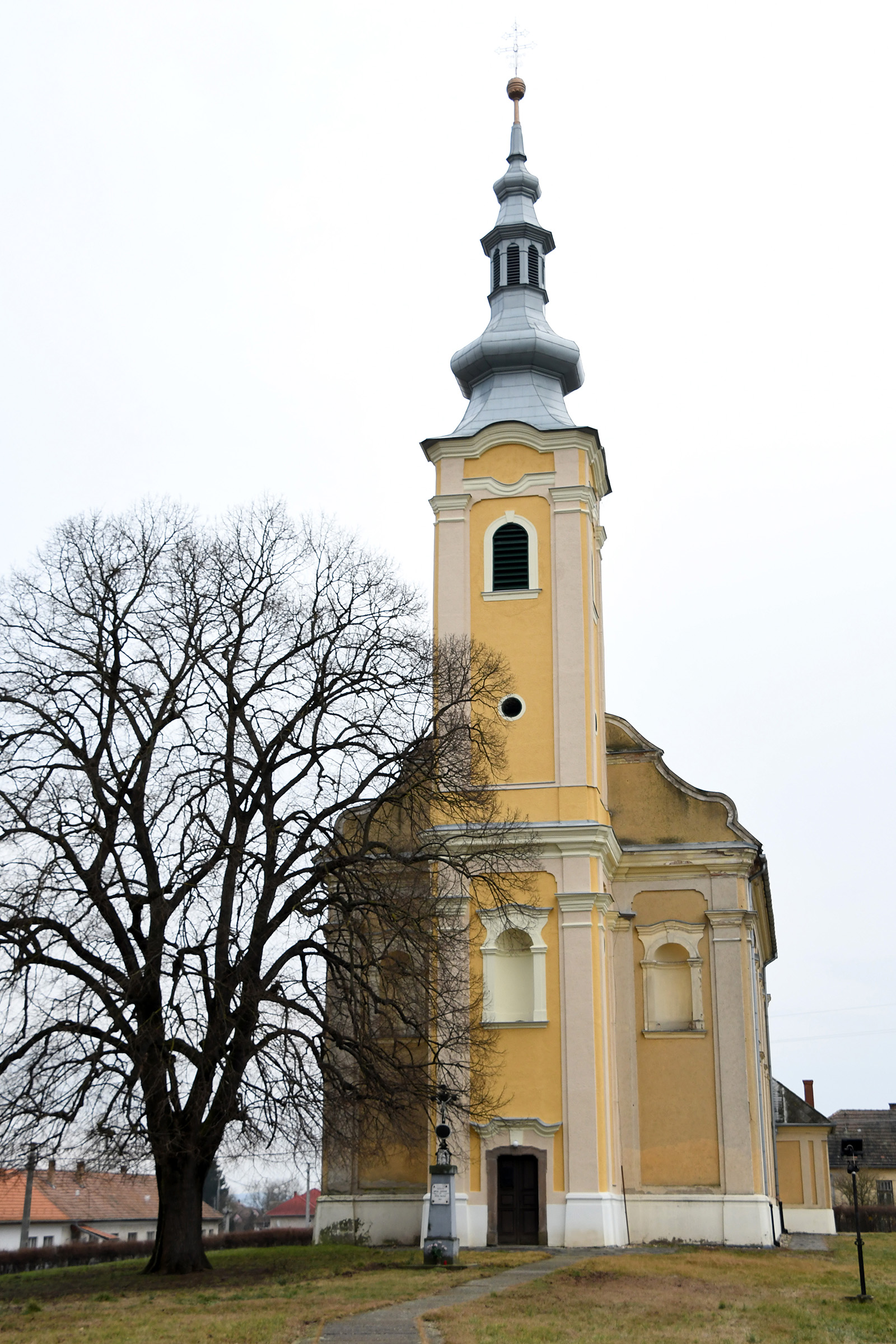
Roman Catholic church in Hugyag, Hungary

Hugyag is a village in Nógrád county, Hungary.

Population by year
Year	Population
1870	1004
1880	812
1890	953
1900	1012
1910	1108
1920	1110
1930	1362
1941	1444
1949	1340
1960	1274
1970	1245
1980	1136
1990	986
2001	911
2011	925
