= Szügy =

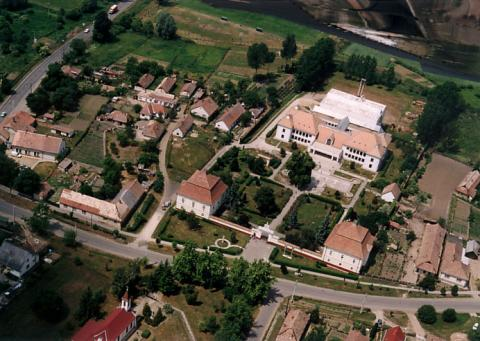
- Picture of Szügy.

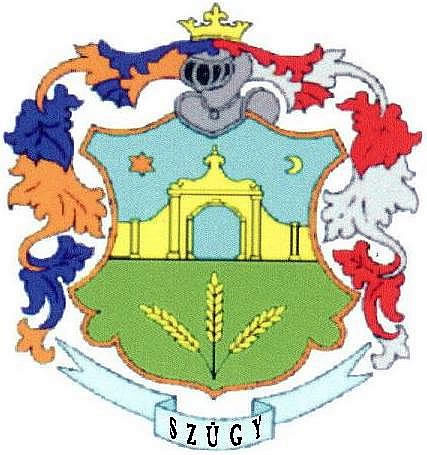
- Coat of arms

- Location of Szügy in Hungary.
- Coordinates: 48°02′10″N 19°19′15″E
- Country: Hungary
- Region: Northern Hungary
- County: Nógrád

Government
  - Mayor: Frenyó Gábor (Ind.)

Area
  - Total: 19.5 km^{2} (7.5 sq mi)

Population (2022)
  - Total: 1,400
  - Density: 72/km^{2} (190/sq mi)
- Time zone: UTC+1 (CET)
  - Summer (DST): UTC+2 (CEST)
- Postal code: 2699
- Area code: 35

Szügy (Slovak: Sudice) is a village and municipality of county Nógrád in northern Hungary.
