= Szécsénke =

- Village (község)
- Location of Nograd County in Hungary

- Location of Szécsénke in Hungary
- Coordinates: 47°54′11″N 19°20′09″E
- Country: Hungary
- Region: Northern Hungary
- County: Nógrád County
- Subregion: Balassagyarmat

Government
  - Mayor: Boglárka Hevér (Ind.)

Area
  - Total: 9.78 km^{2} (3.78 sq mi)
- Elevation: 225 m (738 ft)

Population (1 Jan. 2015)
  - Total: 195
  - Density: 23.11/km^{2} (59.9/sq mi)
- Time zone: UTC+1 (CET)
  - Summer (DST): UTC+2 (CEST)
- Postal code: 2692
- Area code: 35
- Website: http://szecsenke.hu/

Szécsénke is a village in Nógrád County, Northern Hungary Region, Hungary.
