= Magyarnándor =

Village in Nógrád County, Hungary

Coordinates: 47°58′N 19°20′E

Magyarnándor is a village in Nógrád County, Hungary with 1,077 inhabitants (2025).
