= Galgaguta =

- Coat of arms

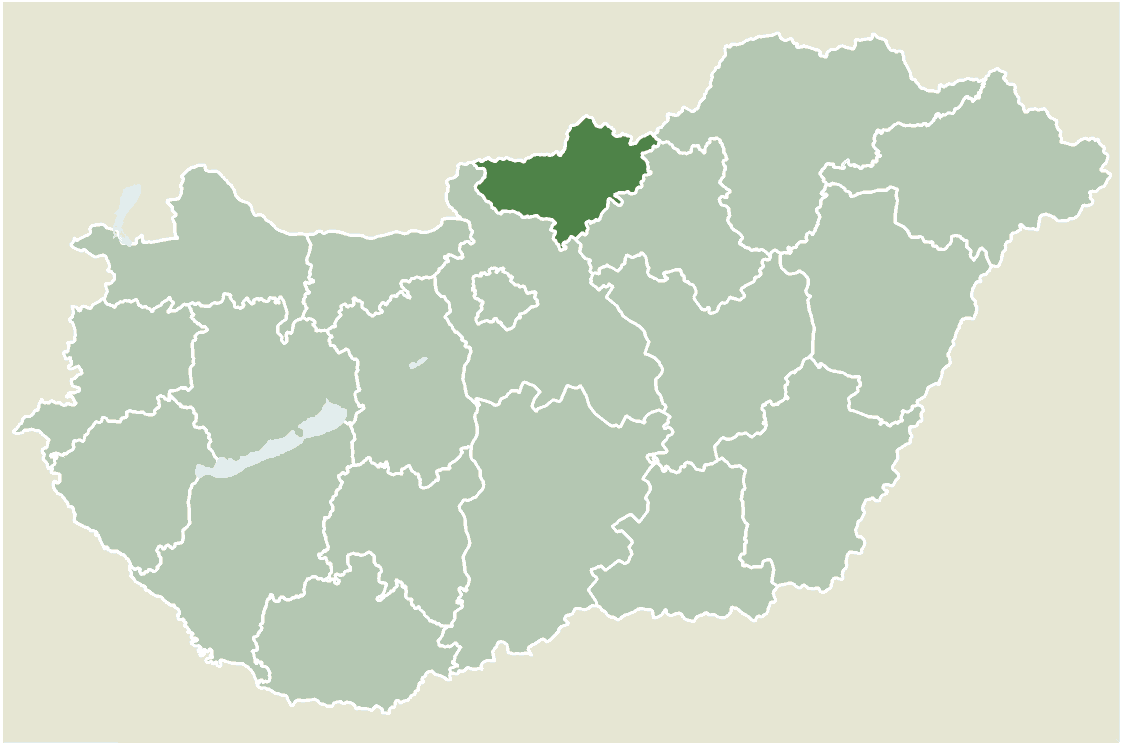
- Location of Nógrád county in Hungary

- Location of Galgaguta
- Coordinates: 47.85092°N 19.38805°E
- Country: Hungary
- County: Nógrád

Area
  - Total: 15.89 km^{2} (6.14 sq mi)

Population (2004)
  - Total: 725
  - Density: 45.62/km^{2} (118.2/sq mi)
- Time zone: UTC+1 (CET)
  - Summer (DST): UTC+2 (CEST)
- Postal code: 2686
- Area code: 35

Galgaguta (Slovak: Guta) is a village in Nógrád county, Hungary.

Population by year
Year	Population
1870	679
1880	568
1890	625
1900	659
1910	705
1920	860
1930	981
1941	1020
1949	997
1960	952
1970	937
1980	928
1990	808
2001	768
2011	657
