= Nógrádkövesd =

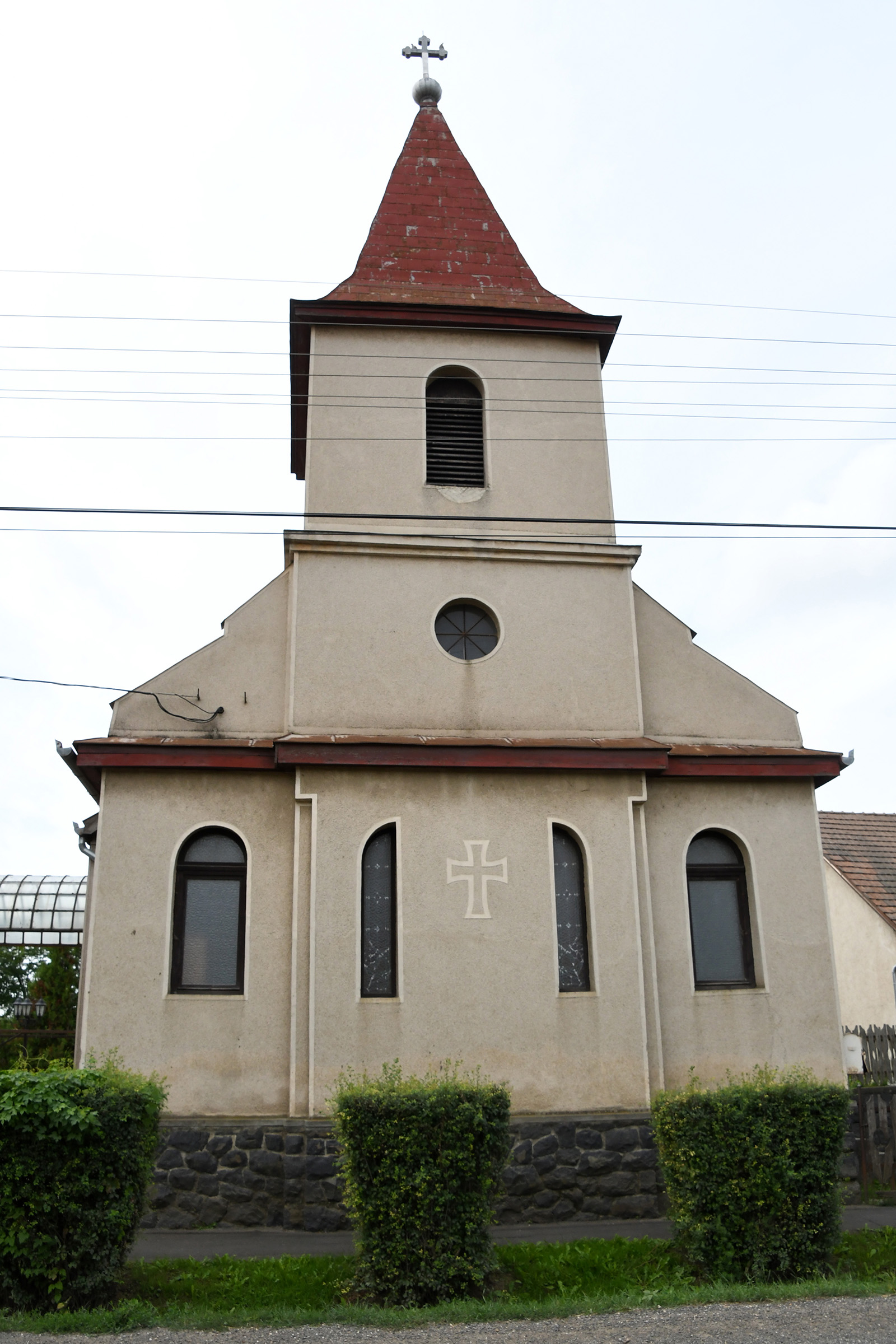
- A Roman Catholic church in Nógrádkövesd.

- Location of Nógrádkövesd in Hungary.
- Coordinates: 47°53′07″N 19°22′08″E
- Country: Hungary
- Region: Northern Hungary
- County: Nógrád

Government
  - Mayor: Gyurek László (Ind.)

Area
  - Total: 8.99 km^{2} (3.47 sq mi)

Population (2022)
  - Total: 612
  - Density: 68.1/km^{2} (176/sq mi)
- Time zone: UTC+1 (CET)
  - Summer (DST): UTC+2 (CEST)
- Postal code: 2691
- Area code: 35

Nógrádkövesd (Slovak: Kivešd) is a village in Nógrád County, Hungary with 612 inhabitants (2022).
