= Becske =

- Coat of arms

- Location of Becske in Hungary
- Coordinates: 47.9106°N 19.377°E
- Country: Hungary
- Region: Northern Hungary
- County: Nógrád

Area
  - Total: 15.66 km^{2} (6.05 sq mi)

Population (2012)
  - Total: 518
  - Density: 33.1/km^{2} (85.7/sq mi)
- Time zone: UTC+1 (CET)
  - Summer (DST): UTC+2 (CEST)
- Postal code: 2693
- Area code: +36 35
- Website: https://becske.hu/

Becske is a village in Nógrád county, Hungary.
