= Bercel =

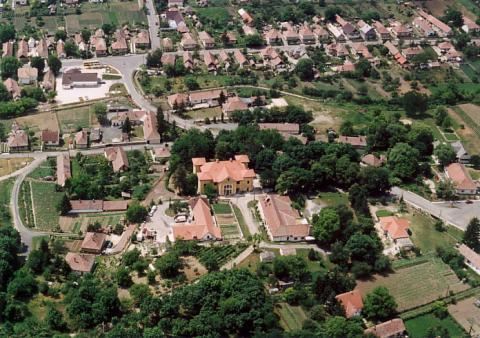
- Aerial view

- Location of Bercel
- Coordinates: 47.87067°N 19.40321°E
- Country: Hungary
- County: Nógrád

Area
  - Total: 35.88 km^{2} (13.85 sq mi)

Population (2019)
  - Total: 1,861
  - Density: 51.87/km^{2} (134.3/sq mi)
- Time zone: UTC+1 (CET)
  - Summer (DST): UTC+2 (CEST)
- Postal code: 2687
- Area code: 35
- Website: http://www.bercel.hu/

Bercel is a village in Nógrád county, Hungary.

Population by year
Year	Population
1870	1712
1880	1642
1890	1721
1900	1822
1910	2060
1920	2228
1930	2190
1941	2277
1949	2356
1960	2438
1970	2528
1980	2309
1990	2198
2001	2127
2011	1982

== Twin towns – sister cities ==
Bercel is twinned with:

- Căpâlnița, Romania
- Modrý Kameň, Slovakia
