= Patvarc =

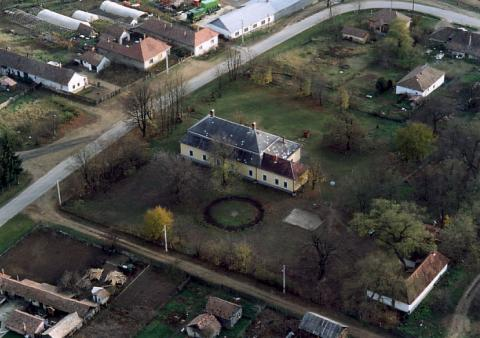

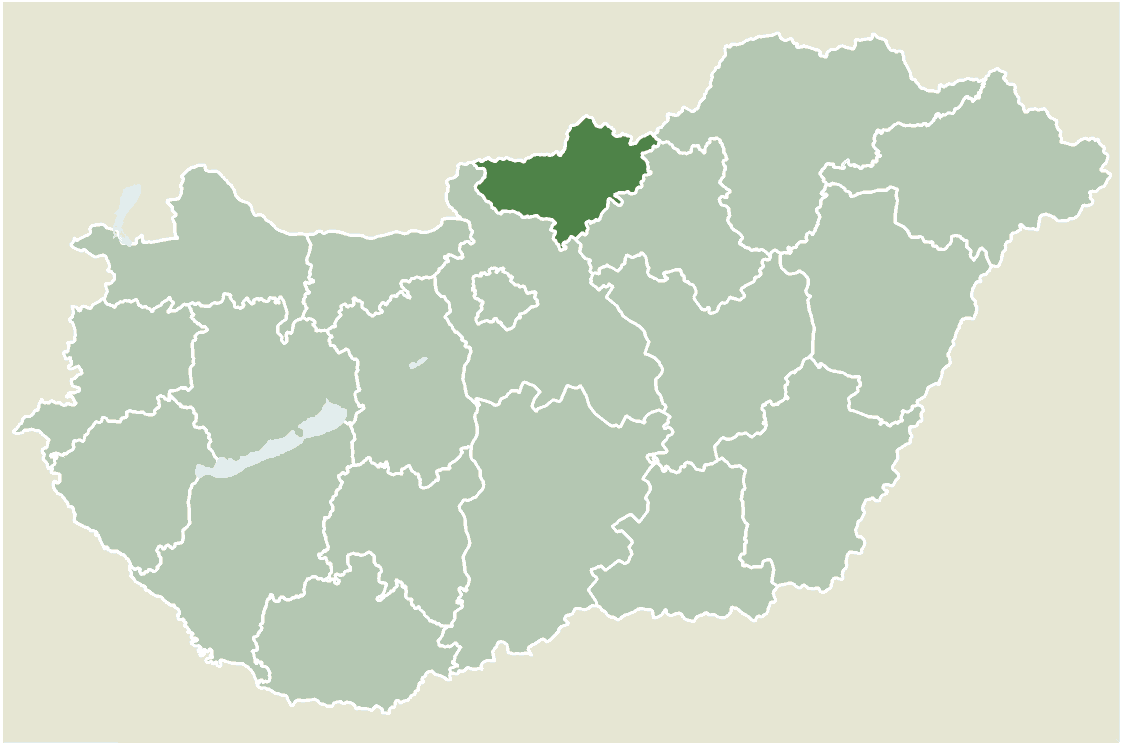
- Location of Nógrád county in Hungary

- Location of Patvarc
- Coordinates: 48.065°N 19.349°E
- Country: Hungary
- County: Nógrád

Government

Area
  - Total: 7.84 km^{2} (3.03 sq mi)

Population (2004)
  - Total: 670
  - Density: 85.45/km^{2} (221.3/sq mi)
- Time zone: UTC+1 (CET)
  - Summer (DST): UTC+2 (CEST)
- Postal code: 2668
- Area code: 35

Patvarc (Slovak: Patvarec) is a village in Nógrád county, Hungary.

== History ==
At the time of the conquest, the Slavs lived most densely in the Ipoly Valley. The name of the village was given by the Slavs, which suggests that the settlement was known as Patvarc at the time of the conquest. Patvarc is a single-item proper name. The first linguistic memory dates from 1335, where it was read as Potvorch. He's actually the people of a person named Potvor.

== Etymology ==
The name comes from the Slovak/Slavic personal name Potvor (potvora - a monster). Potvorce → Patvarc. See also Potvorice, Potvorov.
