= Szanda =

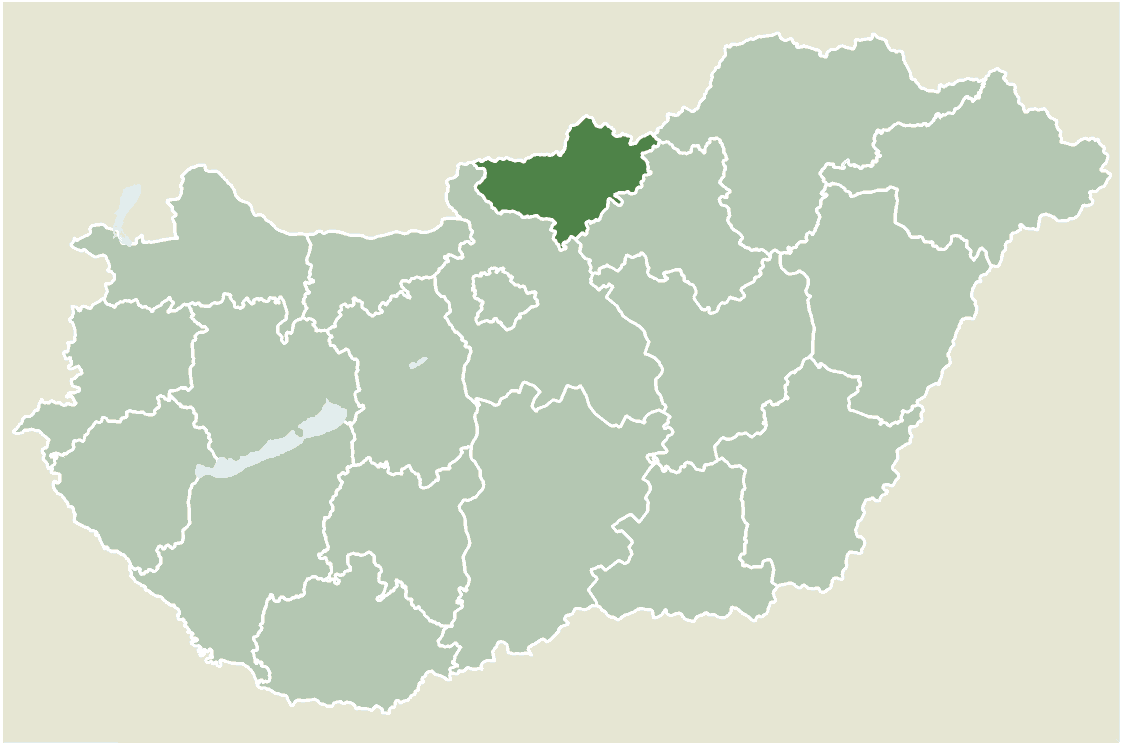
- Location of Nógrád county in Hungary

- Location of Szanda
- Coordinates: 47.92689°N 19.43844°E
- Country: Hungary
- County: Nógrád

Area
  - Total: 21.49 km^{2} (8.30 sq mi)

Population (2004)
  - Total: 707
  - Density: 32.89/km^{2} (85.2/sq mi)
- Time zone: UTC+1 (CET)
  - Summer (DST): UTC+2 (CEST)
- Postal code: 2697
- Area code: 35

Szanda is a village in Nógrád county, Hungary.

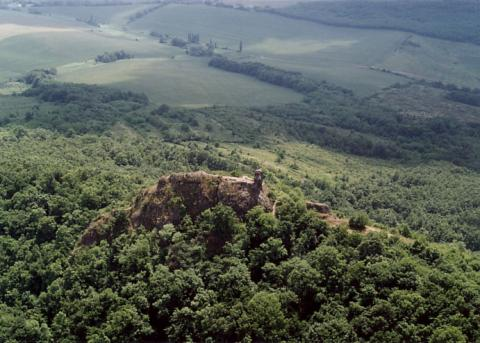

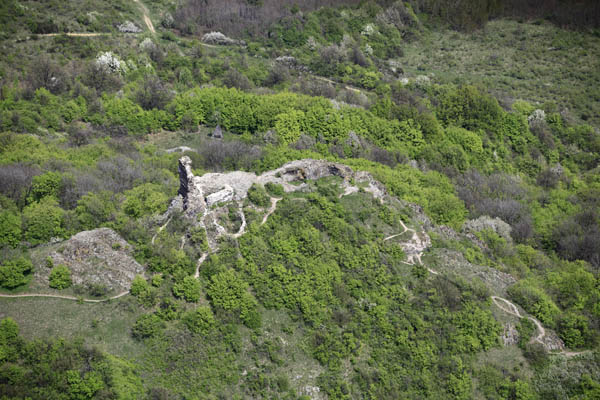

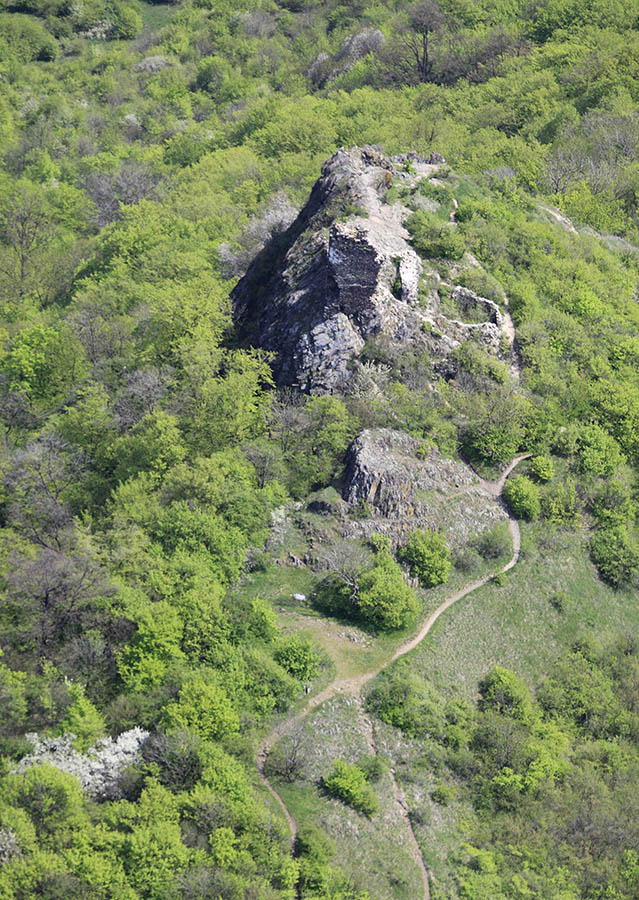

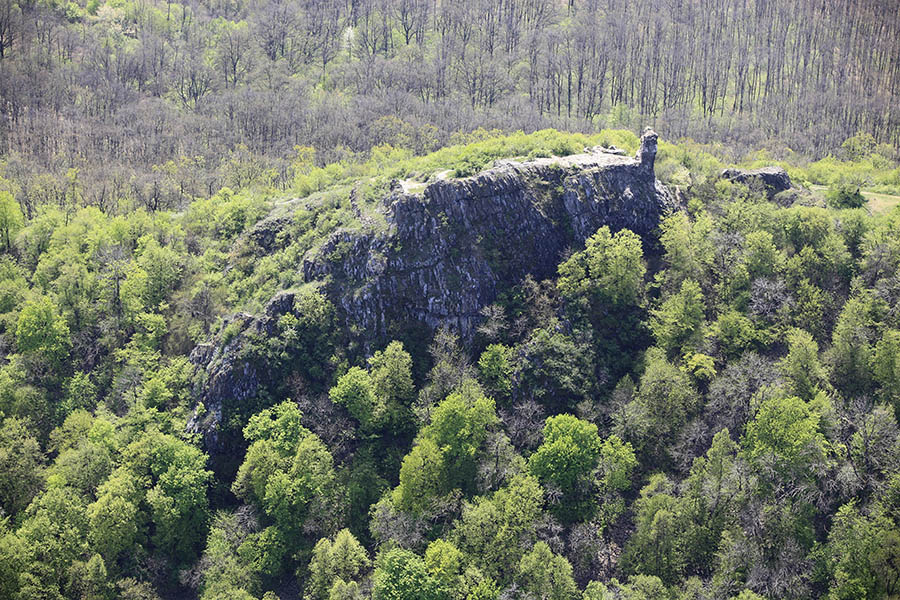

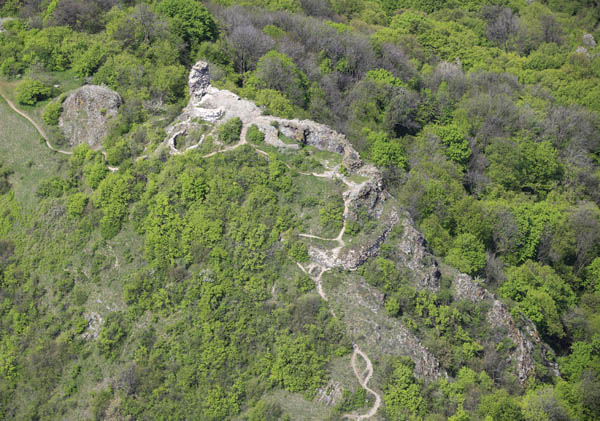

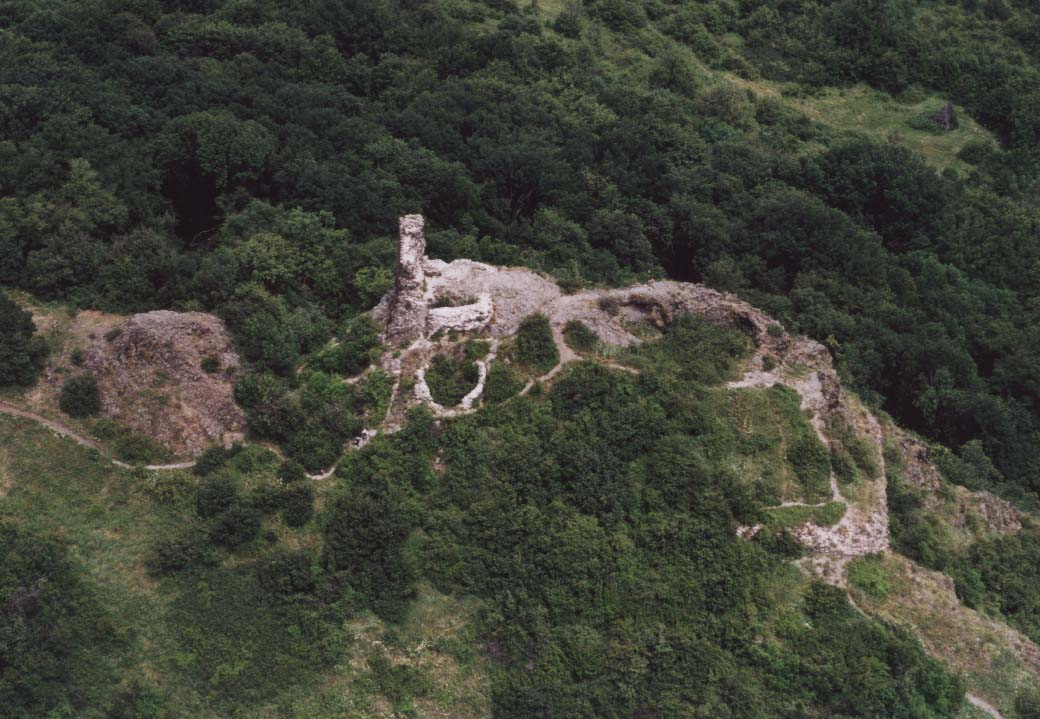
Aerial photography of a castle in Szanda
