= Nógrádmarcal =

Village in Nógrád County, Hungary

Coordinates: 48°01′39″N 19°23′08″E

Nógrádmarcal is a village in Nógrád County, Hungary with 417 inhabitants (2025).
