= Nógrádsipek =

Village in Nógrád County, Hungary

Coordinates: 48°00′40″N 19°30′01″E

Nógrádsipek is a village in Nógrád County, Hungary with 702 inhabitants (1899).

== Etymology ==
The name comes from the Slavic šípek—dog rose.
