= Patak, Hungary =

Patak
- Village (község)
- Location of Nograd County in Hungary

- Location of Patak in Hungary Location of Patak in Nógrád County
- Coordinates: 48°01′09″N 19°08′38″E
- Country: Hungary
- Region: Northern Hungary
- County: Nógrád County
- Subregion: Balassagyarmat

Government
  - Mayor: Fekete Tibor (Fidesz-KDNP)

Area
  - Total: 16.22 km^{2} (6.26 sq mi)

Population (1 Jan. 2015)
  - Total: 898
  - Density: 55/km^{2} (140/sq mi)
- Time zone: UTC+1 (CET)
  - Summer (DST): UTC+2 (CEST)
- Postal code: 2648
- Area code: 35
- Website: http://patak.hu/

Patak is a village in Nógrád County, Northern Hungary Region, Hungary.
