= Dejtár =

Coordinates: 48°02′N 19°10′E

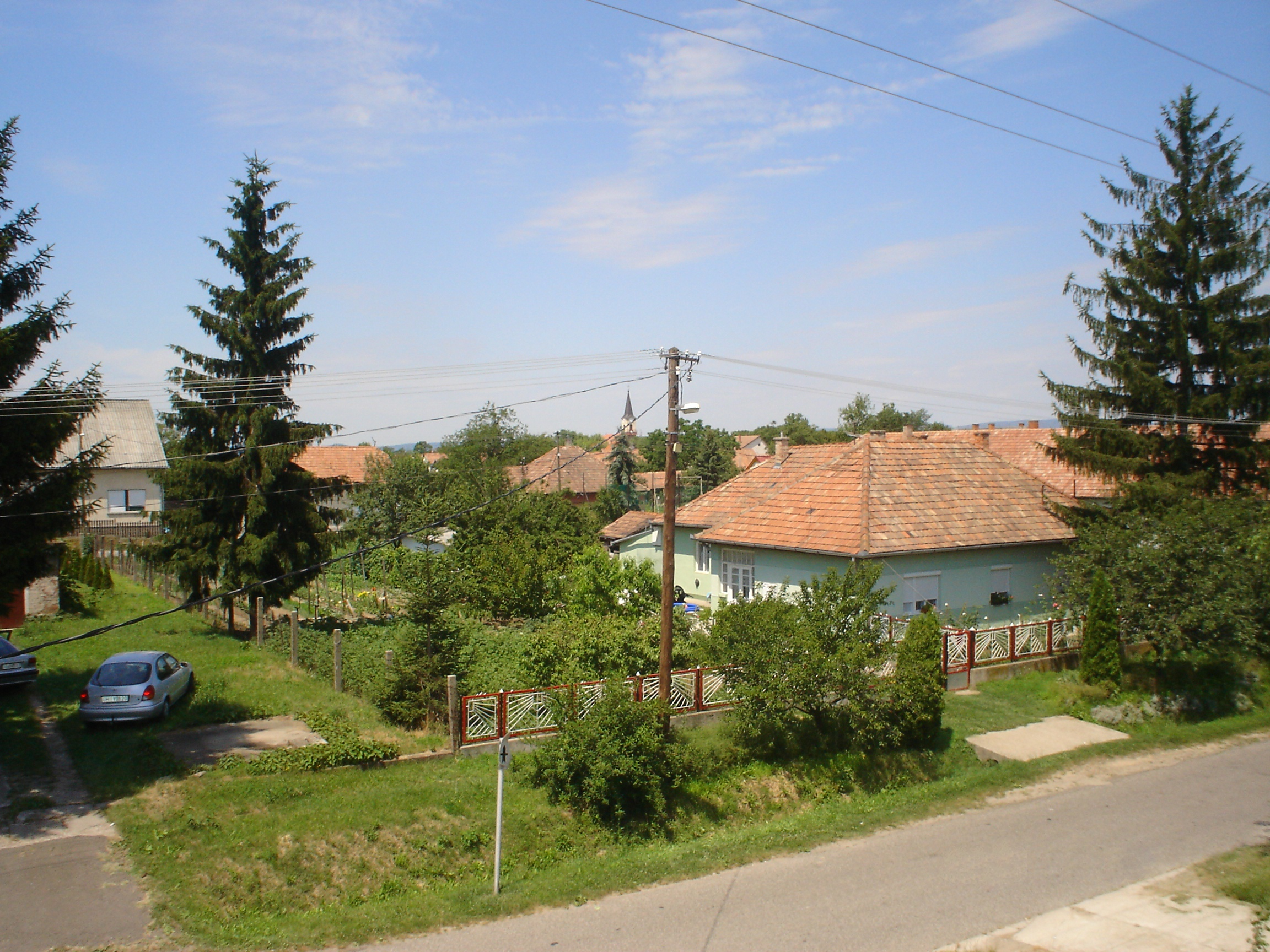
Dejtár

Dejtár is a village and municipality in the comitat of Nógrád, Hungary.

Population by year
Year	Population
1870	1451
1880	1503
1890	1633
1900	1834
1910	1757
1920	1992
1930	1960
1941	1884
1949	2067
1960	2037
1970	1942
1980	1776
1990	1603
2001	1531
2011	1447
