= Terény =

Village in Nógrád County, Hungary

Coordinates: 48°0′26.78″N 19°22′5.05″E

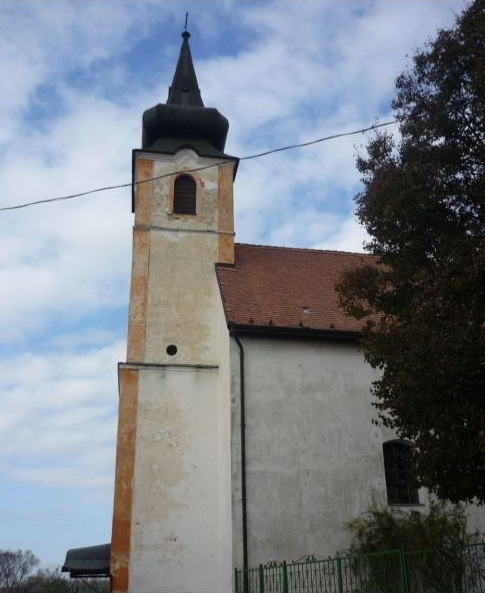
Terényi római katolikus templom

Terény (Slovak: Terany) is a village in Nógrád county, Hungary.

== Geography ==
The village is situated 20 km south of Balassagyarmat, in the valley of Szanda creek, 95 km from Budapest.

== History ==
Terény was first mentioned as Teryan on a diploma during the Árpád dynasty, in 1274.

During the Middle Ages, Terény was referred to as Vásáros-Terjén (Terjén having a fair) on certificates and had the privileges of a city.

== Notable residents ==
The most notable person from Terény is Albert Szent-Györgyi, a Hungarian physiologist, Nobel Prize winner in Physiology or Medicine in 1937. He spent his childhood in Kiskérpuszta in Terény.
