= Iliny =

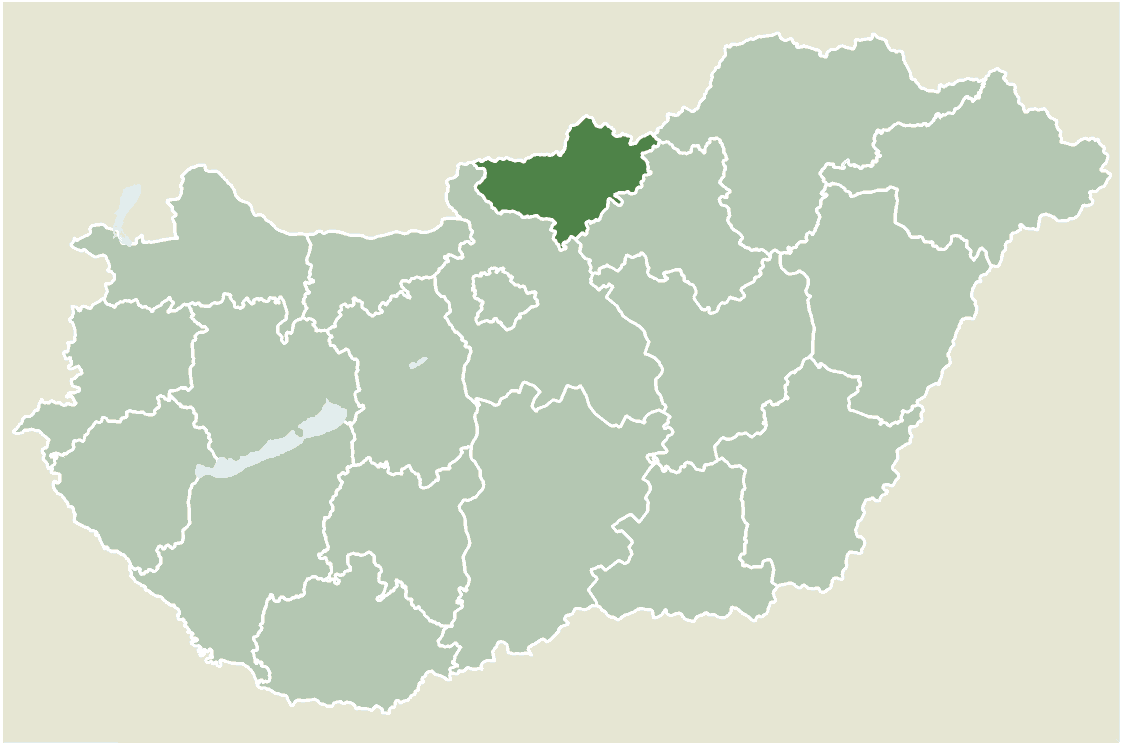
- Location of Nógrád county in Hungary

- Location of Iliny
- Coordinates: 48.03311°N 19.42535°E
- Country: Hungary
- County: Nógrád

Area
  - Total: 6.46 km^{2} (2.49 sq mi)

Population (2004)
  - Total: 185
  - Density: 28.63/km^{2} (74.2/sq mi)
- Time zone: UTC+1 (CET)
  - Summer (DST): UTC+2 (CEST)
- Postal code: 2675
- Area code: 35

Iliny is a village in Nógrád county, Hungary. It lies in the northern part of Nógrád county.

Population by year
Year	Population
1870	300
1880	178
1890	186
1900	214
1910	264
1920	248
1930	261
1941	283
1949	308
1960	352
1970	344
1980	276
1990	222
2001	198
2011	163
