= Érsekvadkert =

Coordinates: 47.997301°N 19.198412°E

- Village
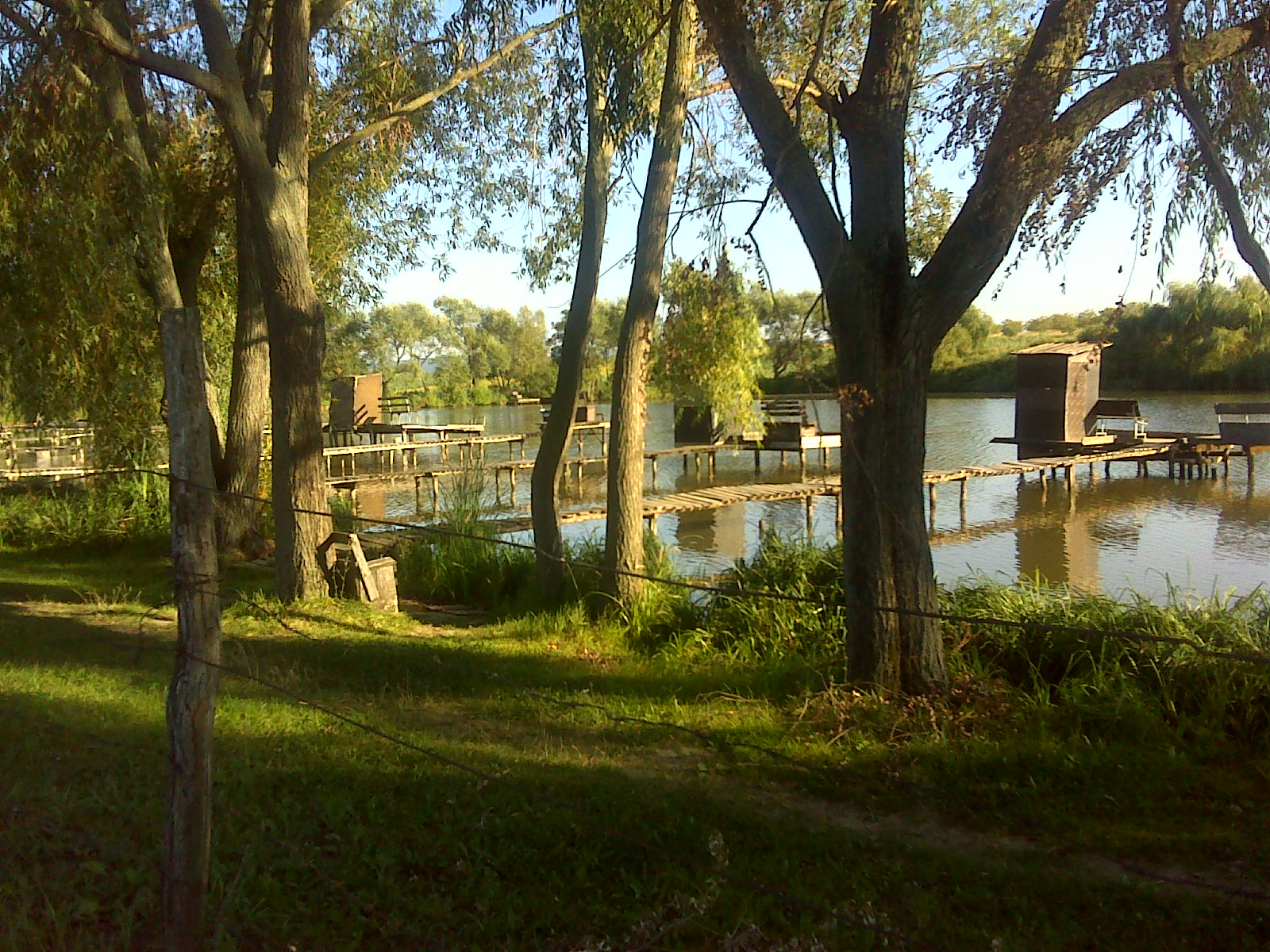

- Coat of arms
- Interactive map of Érsekvadkert
- Country: Hungary
- Region: Northern Hungary
- County: Nógrád
- District: Balassagyarmat

Government
  - Mayor: Attila Őszi Csaba (Ind.)

Area
  - Total: 55.37 km^{2} (21.38 sq mi)

Population (2023)
  - Total: 3,415
  - Density: 61.68/km^{2} (159.7/sq mi)
- Time zone: UTC+1 (CET)
- Postal code: 2659
- Area code: 35

Érsekvadkert is a village in Nógrád County, Hungary with 3,526 inhabitants (2011).
