= Csitár =

Municipality in Nógrád, Hungary

Coordinates: 48°03′N 19°26′E

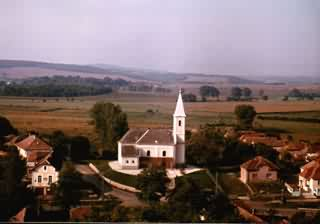
Csitári templom 1

Csitár (Slovak: Čitáre) is a village and municipality in the comitat of Nógrád, Hungary.

Population by year
Year	Population
1870	688
1880	583
1890	608
1900	822
1910	840
1920	861
1930	900
1941	885
1949	884
1960	975
1970	799
1980	632
1990	543
2001	470
2011	424
