= Ipolyvece =

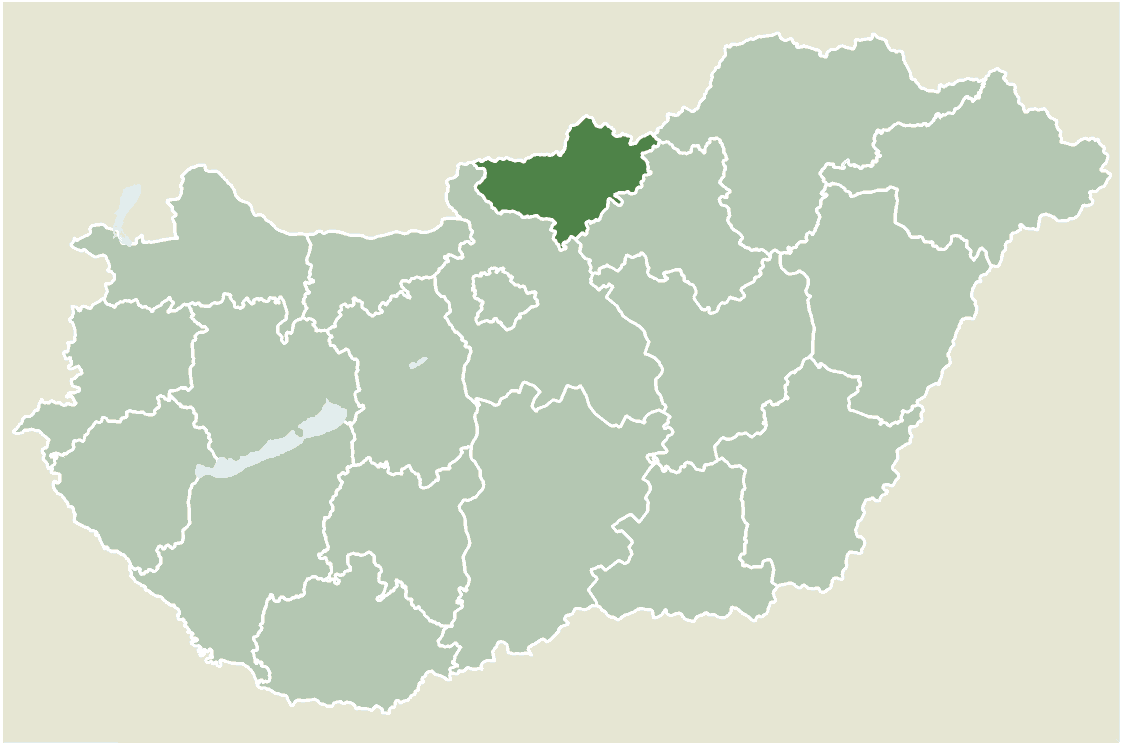
- Location of Nógrád county in Hungary

- Location of Ipolyvece
- Coordinates: 48.06033°N 19.10702°E
- Country: Hungary
- County: Nógrád

Area
  - Total: 13.9 km^{2} (5.4 sq mi)

Population (2004)
  - Total: 898
  - Density: 64.6/km^{2} (167/sq mi)
- Time zone: UTC+1 (CET)
  - Summer (DST): UTC+2 (CEST)
- Postal code: 2669
- Area code: 35

Ipolyvece is a village in Nógrád county, Hungary.

Population by year
| Year | Population |
|---|---|
| 1870 | 687 |
| 1880 | 676 |
| 1890 | 725 |
| 1900 | 852 |
| 1910 | 943 |
| 1920 | 895 |
| 1930 | 1020 |
| 1941 | 1019 |
| 1949 | 1100 |
| 1960 | 1098 |
| 1970 | 1106 |
| 1980 | 1000 |
| 1990 | 886 |
| 2001 | 884 |
| 2011 | 844 |
