= Őrhalom =

- Village (község)
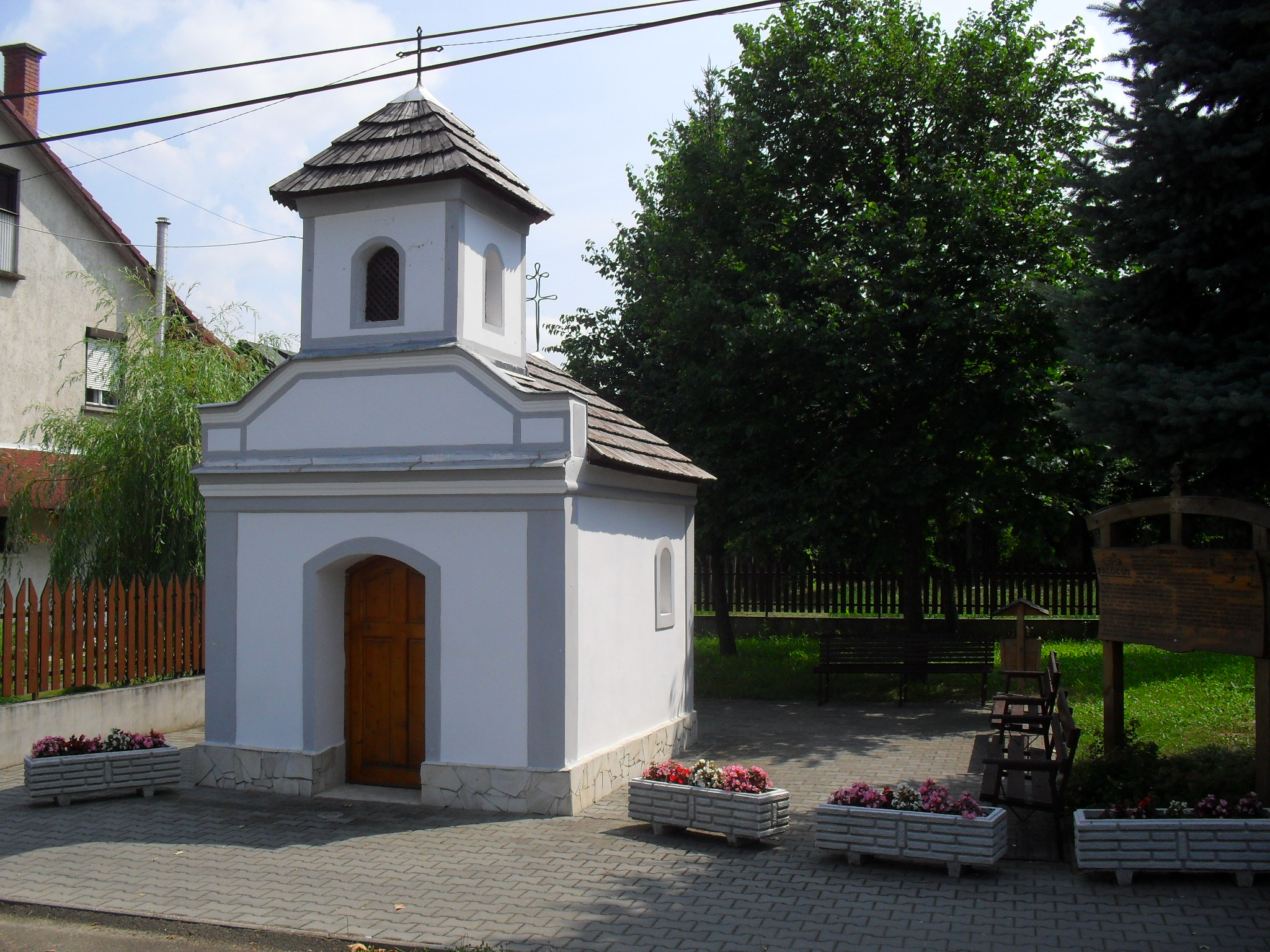
- St. Stephen's Sanctuary

- Coat of arms

- Location of Heves County in Hungary

- Location in Hungary
- Coordinates: 48°04′34″N 19°24′15″E
- Country: Hungary
- Region: Northern Hungary
- County: Nógrád County
- District: Balassagyarmat

Government
  - Mayor: Egon Farkas (Ind.)

Area
  - Total: 17.46 km^{2} (6.74 sq mi)

Population (2015)
  - Total: 967
  - Density: 55.4/km^{2} (143/sq mi)
- Time zone: UTC+1 (CET)
  - Summer (DST): UTC+2 (CEST)
- Postal code: 2671
- Area code: 35
- Website: www.markaz.hu

Őrhalom is a village in Nógrád County, Hungary with 967 inhabitants as of 2015.
