= Galya =

Location
- Country: Hungary

Physical characteristics
- Source
  - location: Mátraalmás, Mátra, Hungary
  - elevation: 830 m (2,720 ft)
- Mouth
  - location: Zagyva at Nemti
  - coordinates: 48°00′02″N 19°55′11″E

Basin features
- Progression: Zagyva→ Tisza→ Danube→ Black Sea

The Galya (Hungarian: Galya-patak) is a small river in Nógrád County, northern Hungary. It originates in Mátra, 830 metres above sea level, southeast of Mátraalmás. It flows north up to Nemti, where it then flows into the Zagyva.

== Settlements on the banks ==
- Mátraalmás
- Szuha
- Mátramindszent
- Nemti
