= Mátranovák =

- Village
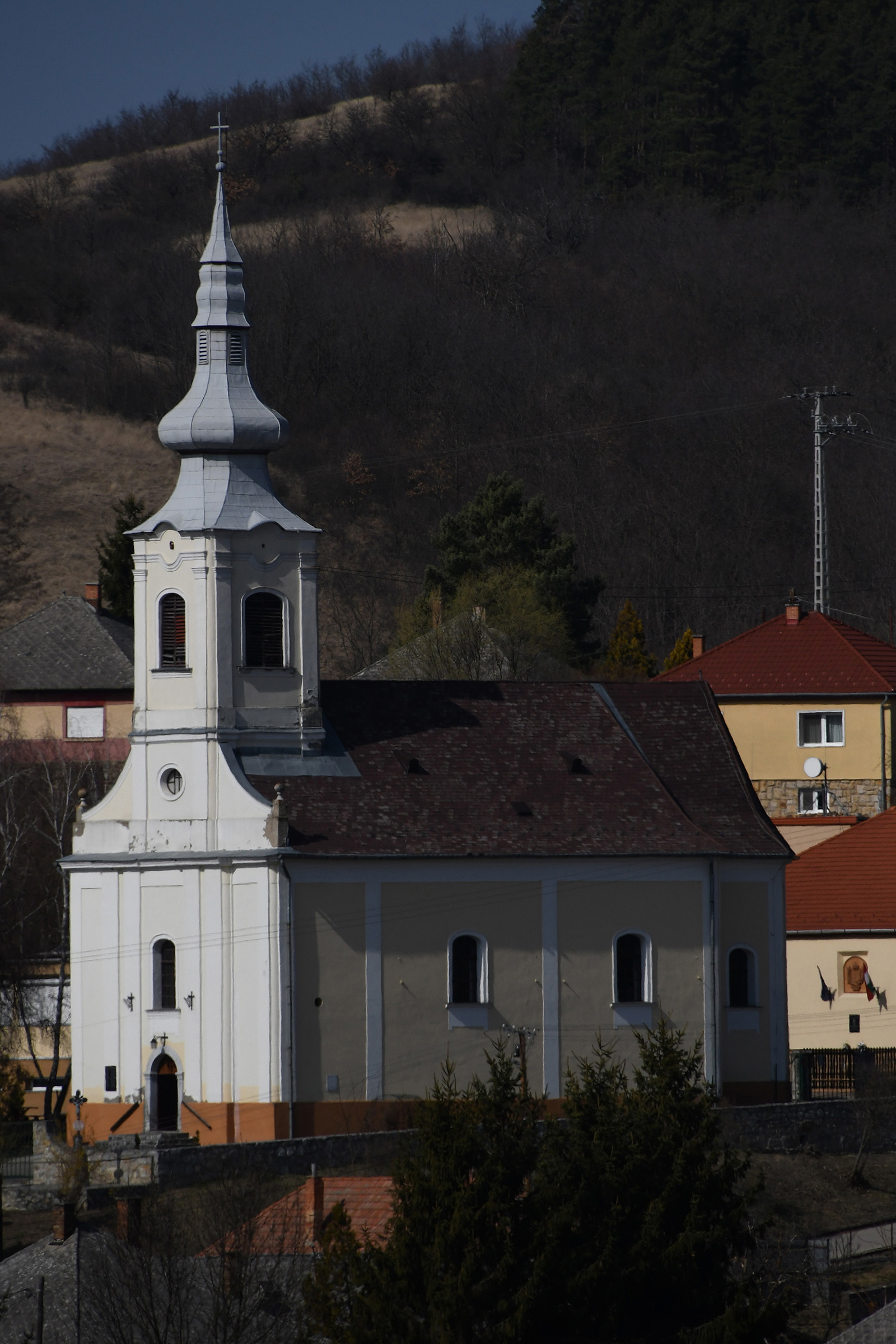
- Saint John of Nepomuk Church

- Coat of arms

- Location in Hungary
- Coordinates: 48°02′15″N 19°59′02″E
- Country: Hungary
- County: Nógrád
- District: Bátonyterenye
- First mentioned: 1389

Government
  - Mayor: Pál Kuborczik (Ind.)

Area
  - Total: 26.97 km^{2} (10.41 sq mi)

Population (2022)
  - Total: 1,551
  - Density: 57.51/km^{2} (148.9/sq mi)
- Time zone: UTC+1 (CET)
  - Summer (DST): UTC+2 (CEST)
- Postal code: 3143
- Area code: 32
- Website: www.matranovak.hu

Mátranovák is a village in Nógrád County, Hungary. The Bárna creek flows through the settlement. As of 2022 census, it has a population of 1551 (see Demographics). The village is located 10.2 km from (Nr. 84) Kisterenye–Kál-Kápolna railway line, 18.2 km from the main road 21 and 50.3 km from the M25 expressway. Although the Nemti railway stop is the closest, but public transport on the railway line ceased on 3 March 2007. The closest train station with public transport in Bátonyterenye is 15.5 km away.

== History ==
The settlement was first mentioned in a document in 1389, when King Zsigmond gave it to Novák. It was already the property of András Horváth in 1548. Due to the Ottoman destruction, in 1633 only 2 houses were left standing. The population of the village was engaged in transport, threshing, forestry and animal husbandry. Animal husbandry was helped by the formation of farms, which, however, in they were depopulated in the 21st century. Count László Teleki, Zsigmond Csoma and Zsigmond Szabó were the landlords of the settlement in 1770. Mátranovák is also one of the Palóc settlements. The church of the village was built in the first years of the 19th century in the Baroque style, and its tower with a bell cornice on the facade has an onion dome. Its pulpit is classicist, its eternal flame is empire style. Ágnes Csemnitzky, Mrs. Okolicsányi opened the first coal mine in 1857, near which a mining settlement was established. The settlement became a mining community. In 1887, an industrial plant was built next to the coal mine from the Mátramindszent railway station. In the first years of the 20th century, the population of the village doubled, in 1911 passenger transport started on the railway line, Mátranovák had their own station called Mátranovak-Homokterenye. Baron Jenő Solymossy had a brick factory built in 1929. The settlement became a cultural center with the opening of the casino in 1922. The elementary school originally consisted of two parts and the lower classes were taught at the mining site. The settlement had its own cooperative between 1959 and 1965. The Ganz-MÁVAG bridge factory was built in 1969, which later switched to the production of railway car chassis. In 2005, the factory became the property of Bombardier Transportation Hungary Ltd., but it is still operating. In 1984, the settlement was merged with the neighboring Homokterenye, Jánosakna and Nádújfalu and took on the name Mátraterenye, however, in 1990 the people of Mátranovák decided to secede by referendum and from 1991 the settlement became independent again. The railway transport ceased in 1994 and the railway was demolished.

== Demographics ==
According the 2022 census, 91.1% of the population were of Hungarian ethnicity, 1.2% were Gypsies and 8.8% were did not wish to answer. The religious distribution was as follows: 39.4% Roman Catholic, 2.2% Calvinist, 0.7% Lutheran, 15.1% non-denominational, and 40.5% did not wish to answer. The Gypsies have a local nationality government. 1513 people live in the village and only 1 person live in the other inner area (Mátracserpuszta) and another one person in a farm.

Population by years:

Year	1870	1880	1890	1900	1910	1920	1930	1941
Population	915	874	1024	1248	1967	2842	2770	2798
Year	1949	1960	1970	1980	1990	2001	2011	2022
Population	2926	3058	2946	2663	2405	2067	1840	1551

== Twin towns ==
- Kyustendil, Bulgaria
- Medgidia, Romania
- Odžaci, Serbia
- Ödemiş, Turkey
- Virovitica, Croatia
- Łomża, Poland

== Politics ==
Mayors since 1991:

- 1991–2006: István Béla Csikó (independent)
- 2006–2010: Gyula Földi (independent)
- 2010–2024: Mrs. Ernő Bodor (independent)
- 2024–: Pál Kuborczik (independent)
