= Iványi (river) =

Location
- Country: Hungary

Physical characteristics
- Source
  - location: Mátra, Hungary
  - elevation: 470 m (1,540 ft)
- Mouth
  - location: Zagyva, Mátraterenye
  - coordinates: 48°00′19″N 19°56′07″E

Basin features
- Progression: Zagyva→ Tisza→ Danube→ Black Sea

The Iványi (Hungarian: Iványi-patak) originates in the Mátra range at nearly 470 metres above sea level, south of Mátraterenye, Nógrád County, Hungary. It is a left tributary of the Zagyva. The stream flows northward and reaches the Zagyva north of Mátramindszent.

The Tószeri flows into the Iványi close to its origin not far from Mátraterenye.

== Settlements on the banks ==
- Mátraterenye
