= Mindszenti =

Location
- Country: Hungary

Physical characteristics
- Source: Mátra mountains
  - location: Mátramindszent, Hungary
  - elevation: 450 m (1,480 ft)
- Mouth
  - location: Zagyva at Nemti
  - coordinates: 48°00′19″N 19°56′05″E

Basin features
- Progression: Zagyva→ Tisza→ Danube→ Black Sea

The Mindszenti (Hungarian: Mindszenti-patak) is a river in Hungary that originates in Mátra at 450 metres above sea level, south of Mátramindszent, Nógrád County. It flows northward to Nemti, where it enters the Zagyva.

== Settlements on the banks ==
- Mátramindszent
- Nemti
