= Tószeri =

Location
- Country: Hungary

Physical characteristics
- Source
  - location: Nádújfalu, Cserhát, Hungary
  - elevation: 300 m (980 ft)
- Mouth
  - location: Iványi, Mátraterenye
  - coordinates: 48°00′13″N 19°56′51″E

Basin features
- Progression: Iványi→ Zagyva→ Tisza→ Danube→ Black Sea

The Tószeri originates at Cserhát, east of Nádújfalu in Nógrád County, Hungary, at 300 metres (980 ft) above sea level. It flows to the west and flows into the river Iványi at Mátraterenye not far from where the Iványi originates in Nógrád County.

== Settlements on the banks ==
- Nádújfalu
- Mátraterenye
