= Boldog, Hungary =

Boldog
- Village
- Coat of arms

- Location within Hungary
- Coordinates: 47°36′11″N 19°41′17″E
- Country: Hungary
- Region: Northern Hungary
- County: Heves County

Area
  - Total: 26.74 km^{2} (10.32 sq mi)

Population (2010)
  - Total: 3,041
  - Density: 113.7/km^{2} (294.5/sq mi)
- Time zone: UTC+1 (CET)
  - Summer (DST): UTC+2 (CEST)
- Postal code(s): 3016
- Area code: 37
- Website: www.boldog.hu

Boldog is a municipality in the Hatvan kistérség (Hungarian subregion) of Heves County, Northern Hungary Region, Hungary. It is located 9 km from Hatvan, between the rivers Zagyva and Galga.

== History ==
Boldog has been inhabited continuously for several millennia. Boldog is situated between the rivers Zagyva and Galga and at the point of intersection of three counties (comitatus), that of Heves, Jász-Nagykun-Szolnok and Pest. The place is rich in historical evidences. In the south of the municipality, the remains of the Devil's Dykes take course, that had been built by the Sarmatians between 324 and 337 and that connects the rivers Danube and Tisza.

The village was mentioned for the first time in the year 1395 (as Boldogazzonhothvana). The municipality matured continuously: since 1867, vine is cultivated here and also the cultivation of melons became more and more important since that time. Boldog is in terms of keeping traditions, one of the most faithful towns in Heves County. The first book about stitchery in Boldog was published in 1942: it also introduced the white work of Boldog.

The costumes of Boldog can be viewed in action yearly on the Jézus Szíve Búcsú (third Sunday after Pentecost). Several groups have been founded to keep the old songs and customs alive: the Kaláris-folk-dance-group, the men's choir of Boldog as well as the women's choir.

=== Legend about the origin of the name ===
When in 1552, during the occupation of Hungary through the Ottoman Empire, Turkish troops advanced into the area, the inhabitants of Boldog had to leave the original place Boldog was located at and settled down at the village's present location (then a marsh). According to the legend, the "move" was completed within a single night and the village leader, judge István Bonta, bumped his stick into the ground of the marsh island saying: "Itt leszünk mi boldogok!" (in English "Here we will be happy"; the Hungarian word boldog means happy).

Actually, the name is probably derived from Nagyboldogasszony – a Hungarian name for the Virgin Mary.

== Population ==
In 2001, 96% of the population were Magyars, 4% considered themselves Roma. The Hungarian residents can be considered part of the ethnic group of the Palóc. In 2010, Boldog had 3041 inhabitants.

== Mentionable things ==
- Tájház: built in 1871, it is now a memorial of art that introduces the traditional way of house building and the culture of the Palóc.
- Baroque church with a monument of John of Nepomuk in its garden
- Heroes garden with a monument for the soldiers fallen in action in World War I and World War II
- cemetery chapel with a memorial table in Sándor Dávidas honor (doctor of Mihály Táncsics'); across from that, there is the millennium memorial park with a statue of Stephen I of Hungary and a Kopjafa in honour of the soldiers of Boldog

== Picture gallery ==
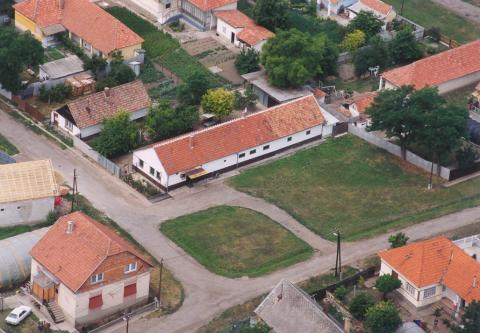

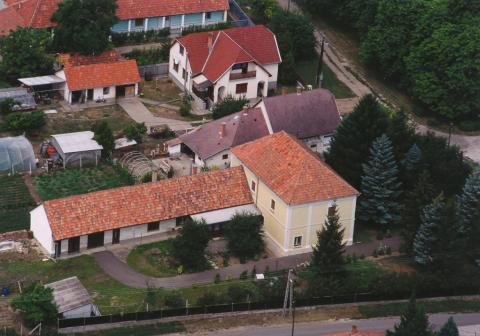

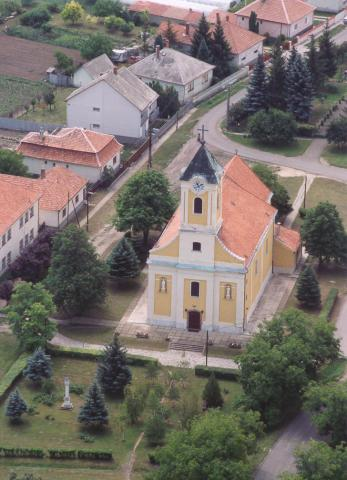

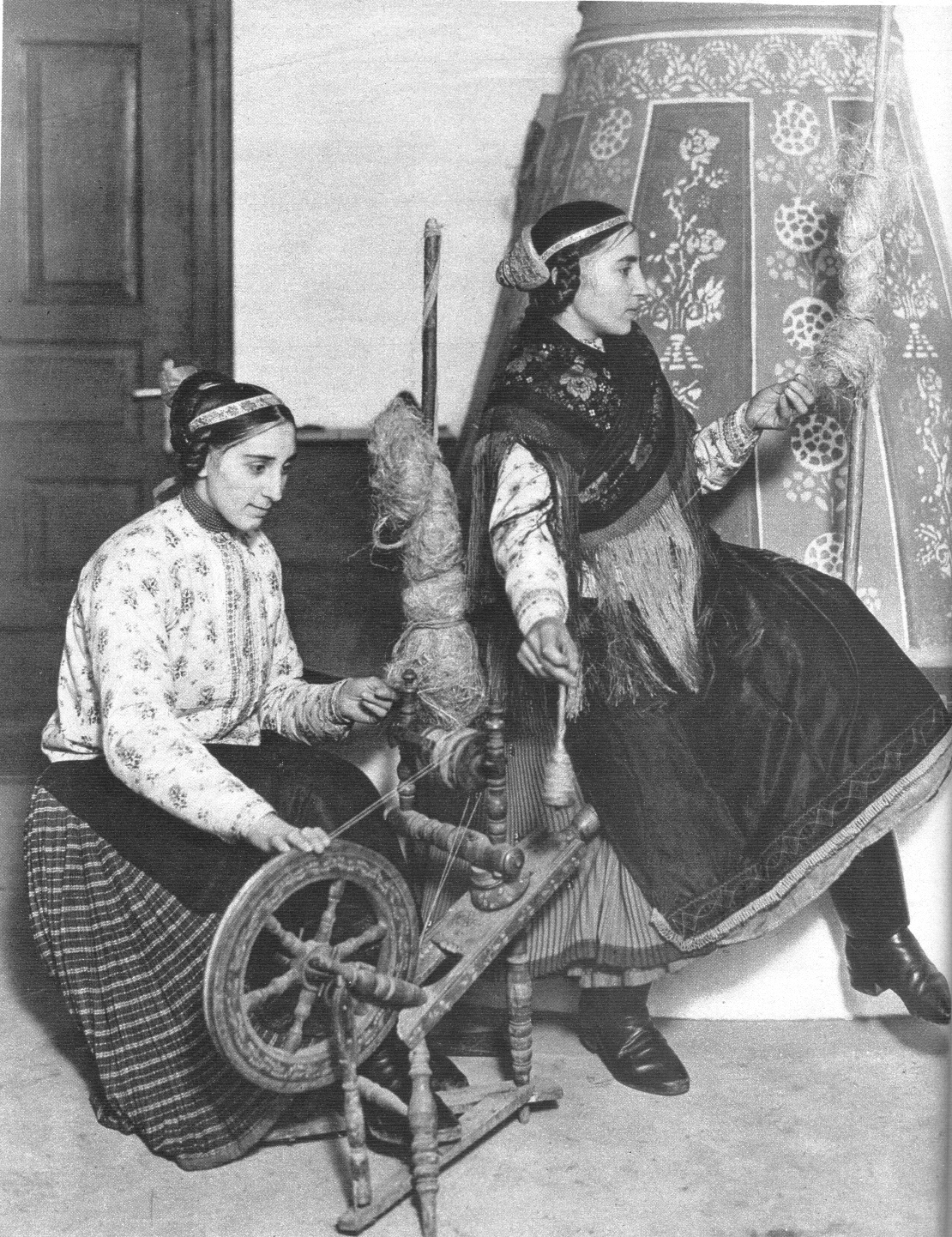
Women from Boldog when spinning, before 1930

== See also ==
- Official website of Boldog (in Hungarian)
- Aerial photos of Boldog
- Tradition keeping and Hussars association of Boldog (in Hungarian)
