= Kecskés =

Origin
- Language: Hungarian
- Meaning: goatherder
- Region of origin: Hungarian-speaking area

Kecskés is a Hungarian language surname, which means "goatherd", derived from the Hungarian kecske, meaning "goat". Variants of the name include Ketskés, Kechkés and Checicheș. The name may refer to:

- Ákos Kecskés (born 1996), Hungarian football player
- István Kecskés (1947–2025), Hungarian linguist
- Tamás Kecskés (born 1986), Hungarian football player

== See also ==
- Kecskéd, Hungary
- Kecskés (river), Hungary
