= Mátraterenye =

- Village
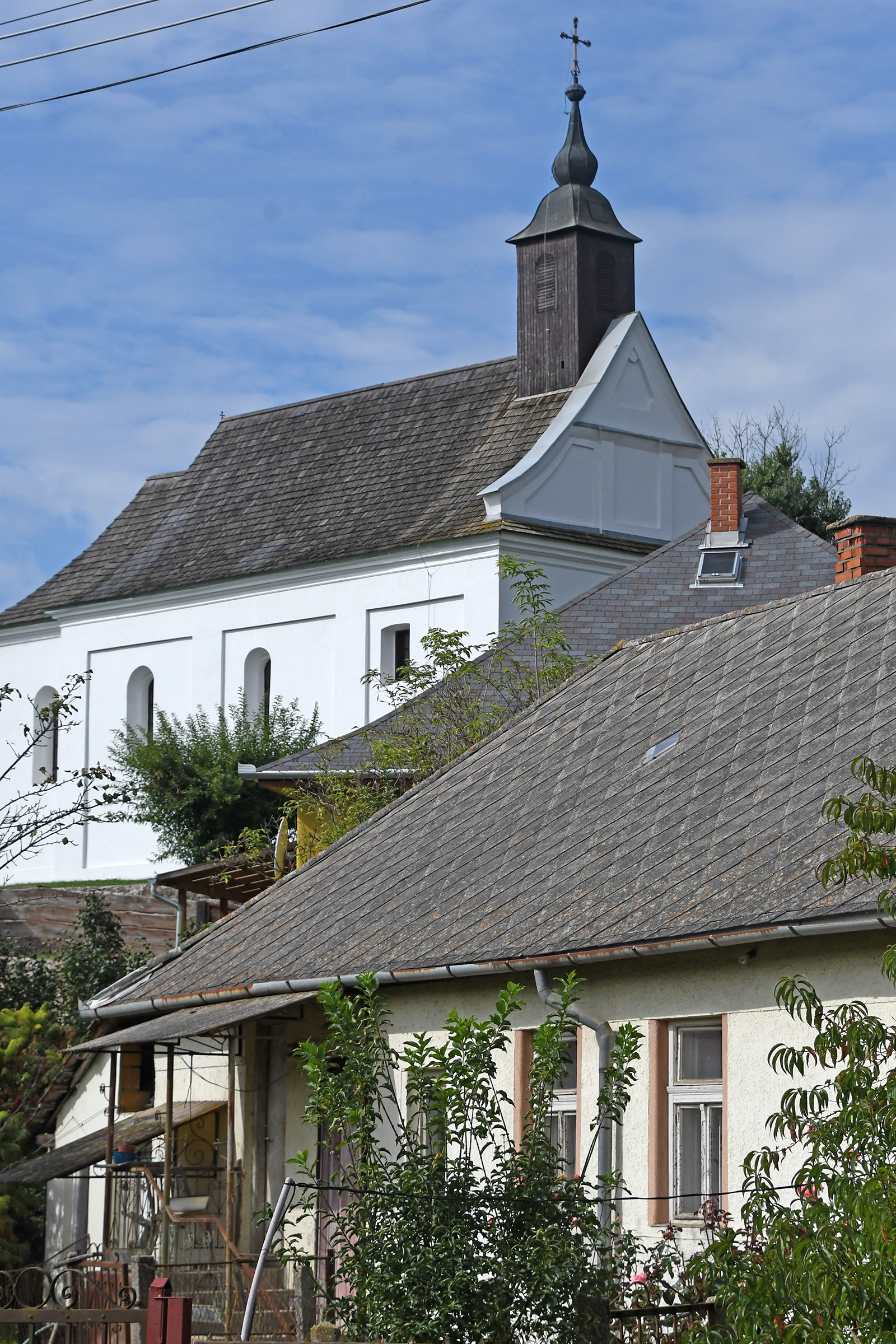
- Exaltation of the Holy Cross Church

- Coat of arms

- Location in Hungary
- Coordinates: 48°01′58″N 19°56′51″E
- Country: Hungary
- County: Nógrád
- District: Bátonyterenye
- Unification: 1984

Government
  - Mayor: László Gecse (Fidesz–KDNP)

Area
  - Total: 28.13 km^{2} (10.86 sq mi)

Population (2022)
  - Total: 1,661
  - Density: 59.05/km^{2} (152.9/sq mi)
- Time zone: UTC+1 (CET)
  - Summer (DST): UTC+2 (CEST)
- Postal code: 3145
- Area code: 32
- Website: www.matraterenye.hu

Mátraterenye is a village in Nógrád County, Hungary. The Zagyva river flows through the settlement. As of 2022 census, it has a population of 1661 (see Demographics). The village is located 7.1 km from (Nr. 84) Kisterenye–Kál-Kápolna railway line, 14.8 km from the main road 21 and 47.1 km from the M25 expressway. Although the Nemti railway stop is the closest, but public transport on the railway line ceased on 3 March 2007. The closest train station with public transport in Bátonyterenye is 13.7 km away.

== History ==
The first documented mention of the settlement dates from 1274 under the name Atyásháza, which marked the central part of the present-day settlement (Homokterenye), the settlement's church, St. Joseph's Church, was also built in the 13th century. King Sigismund donated the village which took his name, to János Homokterenyei in 1418. The southern part of today's settlement (Nádújfalu) appears for the first time in 1426 among the estates of the Iváni family, still under the name Wyfalw. In the Ottoman tax census of 1555, there are 5 houses in Homokterenye and one in Nádújfalu. The Homokterenye family died out in 1563, so the village became the property of András Berényi. Nádújfalu was depopulated in the 16th century due to the destruction of the Ottomans. However, in the 18th century, the population grew again and in 1746, the Exaltation of the Holy Cross church was built in Nádújfalu with a wooden coffer. Nádújfalu in 1871 and Homokterenye in 1874 also burned down. A private siding was built in 1887 from the Mátramindszent railway station to the Mátranovák coal mines, which passed through Homokterenye. A quarry in Nádújfalun, a coal mine was opened north of Homokterenye, the northern part of today's settlement (Jánosakna) was formed due to the latter. In addition to mining, the population made elm brooms and wove linen. Passenger transport started on the railway line in 1911, and Homoterenye got its own stop in 1914. Jánosakna, Homokterenye, Mátranovák and Nádújfalu had merged, and formed a new village under the name Mátraterenye in 1984. After the closure of the mines Mátranovák separated from the Mátraterenye in 1991, the railway transport ceased in 1994 and the railway was demolished.

== Demographics ==
According the 2022 census, 85.5% of the population were of Hungarian ethnicity, 7.7% were Gypsies, 0.5% German and 14.3% were did not wish to answer. The religious distribution was as follows: 34.4% Roman Catholic, 1.4% Calvinist, 0.5% Lutheran, 19.6% non-denominational, and 42.2% did not wish to answer. The Gypsies have a local nationality government. 1652 people live in the village and 7 person live in a mine site.

Population by years:

Year	1870	1880	1890	1900	1910	1920	1930	1941
Population	1280	1130	1798	1938	2195	2341	2677	2655
Year	1949	1960	1970	1980	1990	2001	2011	2022
Population	2768	2907	2860	2649	2225	2050	1939	1661

== Politics ==
Mayors since 1990:

- 1990–2002: Nándor Szabó (independent, except between 1994 and 1998 when supported by the MSZP, the DKP, the MP, the Circle of Friends and the NKSE)
- 2002–2006: József Bodor (independent)
- 2006–: László Gecse (Until 2010 MSZP, then independent between 2010 and 2019, since 2019 supported by the Fidesz–KDNP)
