= Dorogháza =

- Village
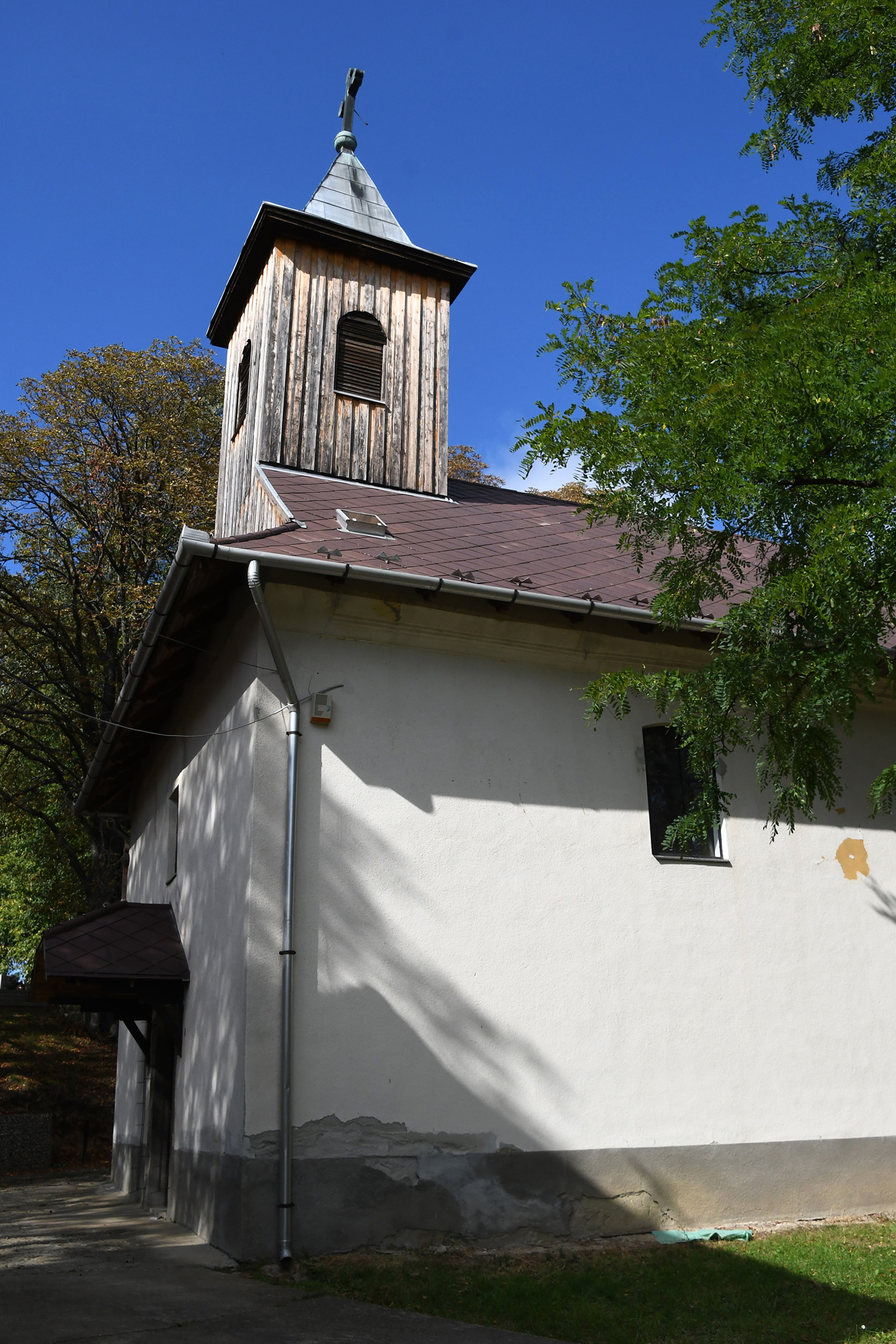
- Exaltation of the Holy Cross Church

- Coat of arms

- Location in Hungary
- Coordinates: 47°59′17″N 19°54′02″E
- Country: Hungary
- County: Nógrád
- District: Bátonyterenye
- First mentioned: 1280

Government
  - Mayor: Mrs. László Kővári (Fidesz–KDNP)

Area
  - Total: 17.68 km^{2} (6.83 sq mi)

Population (2022)
  - Total: 979
  - Density: 55.4/km^{2} (143/sq mi)
- Time zone: UTC+1 (CET)
  - Summer (DST): UTC+2 (CEST)
- Postal code: 3153
- Area code: 32
- Website: www.doroghaza.hu

Dorogháza is a village in Nógrád County, Hungary, in the Mátra mountain range. The Ménkes creek flows through the settlement. As of 2022 census, it has a population of 979 (see Demographics). The village is located 2.2 km from (Nr. 84) Kisterenye–Kál-Kápolna railway line, 8.5 km from the main road 21 and 50.9 km from the M3 motorway. Although the Nemti railway stop is the closest, but public transport on the railway line ceased on 3 March 2007. The closest train station with public transport is in Bátonyterenye 8.5 km away.

== History ==
The first written mention of Dorogháza dates from 1280, when the estate of the Baksa genus was divided. Later it became the property of the Kompolthy and then the Országh families, as an accessory of the castle in Sirok. It became a customs office in 1479, but was depopulated for years due to the Turkish destruction in 1552. Its owner became István Dorogházy in 1684, who died without descendants. The Exaltation of the Holy Cross church was built in 1758, in the Baroque style. The wrought iron door of the sacristy was made by Henrik Fazola. A separate bell tower in 1820 was built next to the church. The settlement was fundamentally influenced by the Ménkes coal mine, which operated between 1949 and 1992, and was located 4.3 km south to the settlement. During the operation of the mine, almost the entire population of the settlement worked in there. The first school of the settlement was established in 1811, and nowadays elementary education takes place in the school built in 1962. In the Dorogpuszta farm birth István Szabó, Jr., sculptor in 1927.

== Demographics ==
According the 2022 census, 93.2% of the population were of Hungarian ethnicity, 4.3% were Gypsies and 6.6% were did not wish to answer. The religious distribution was as follows: 42.3% Roman Catholic, 2.1% Calvinist, 0.6% Lutheran, 10.6% non-denominational, and 42.0% did not wish to answer. 568 people live in the main inner area and 385 in Újtelep, what is 2.0 km away from the village centre. Another 13 people are living in 2 farms.

Population by years:

| Year | 1870 | 1880 | 1890 | 1900 | 1910 | 1920 | 1930 | 1941 |
|---|---|---|---|---|---|---|---|---|
| Population | 957 | 708 | 845 | 851 | 1023 | 1230 | 1345 | 1378 |
| Year | 1949 | 1960 | 1970 | 1980 | 1990 | 2001 | 2011 | 2022 |
| Population | 1504 | 1679 | 1692 | 1652 | 1432 | 1311 | 1182 | 979 |

== Politics ==
Mayors since 1990:

- 1990–2000: Albert Bakos (independent)
- 2000–2006: Mrs. Nándor Pilmayer (Fidesz, between 2002 and 2006 supported by the MDF and the MKDSZ too.)
- 2006–2014: András Farkasházy (independent)
- 2014–: Mrs. László Kővári (Fidesz–KDNP)

A unique relation existed between Dorogháza and neighbouring village Nemti between 2000 and 2002, when the mayor of Nemti was the husband of the Dorogháza's mayor.
