= Lengyendi =

Location
- Country: Hungary

Physical characteristics
- Source: Galya-tető
  - location: Mátra mountains, Hungary
  - elevation: 870 m (2,850 ft)
- Mouth
  - location: Zagyva at Nemti
  - coordinates: 47.9954°N 19.8654°E

Basin features
- Progression: Zagyva→ Tisza→ Danube→ Black Sea

The Lengyendi is a river that originates in Mátra, 870 metres (2,850 ft) above sea level, Northwest from Galyatető, Nógrád County, Hungary. It flows to North up to Nemti, where it flows into the Zagyva.

== Settlements on the banks ==
- Nemti
