= Bátonyterenye District =

Bátonyterenye District Bátonyterenyei járás
- District
- Flag Coat of arms

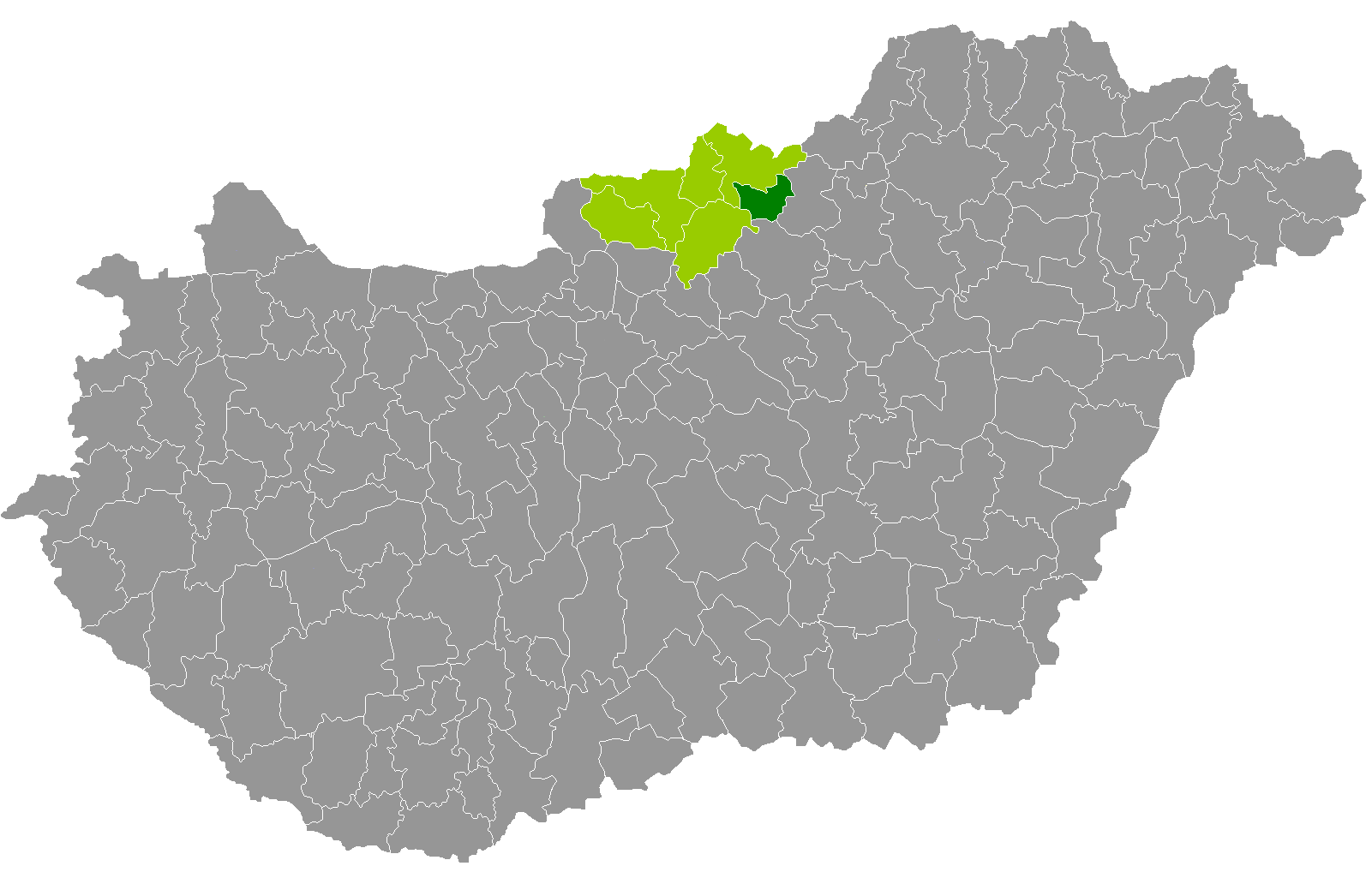
- Bátonyterenye District within Hungary and Nógrád County.
- Country: Hungary
- County: Nógrád
- District seat: Bátonyterenye

Area
  - Total: 215.45 km^{2} (83.19 sq mi)
  - Rank: 6th in Nógrád

Population (2011 census)
  - Total: 21,789
  - Rank: 5th in Nógrád
  - Density: 101/km^{2} (260/sq mi)

Bátonyterenye (Hungarian: Bátonyterenyei járás) is a district in eastern part of Nógrád County. Bátonyterenye is also the name of the town where the district seat is found. The district is located in the Northern Hungary Statistical Region.

== Geography ==
Bátonyterenye District borders with Salgótarján District to the north and west, Pétervására District (Heves County) to the east, Gyöngyös District (Heves County) to the south, Pásztó District to the southwest. The number of the inhabited places in Bátonyterenye District is 8.

== Municipalities ==
The district has 1 town and 7 villages. (ordered by population, as of 1 January 2013)

- **Bátonyterenye** (12,764) – district seat
- Dorogháza (1,101)
- Mátramindszent (842)
- Mátranovák (1,730)
- Mátraterenye (1,867)
- Mátraverebély (1,958)
- Nemti (743)
- Szuha (585)

The bolded municipality is the city.

== Demographics ==
Religion in Bátonyterenye District (2011 census)
1. Catholic Church (47.7%)
2. Greek Catholicism (0.30%)
3. Calvinism (1.80%)
4. Lutheranism (0.90%)
5. Other religions (1.30%)
6. Non-religious (20.5%)
7. Atheists (1.00%)
8. Undeclared (26.5%)

In 2011, it had a population of 21,789 and the population density was 101/km^{2}.

Year	County population	Change
2011	21,789	n/a

=== Ethnicity ===
Besides the Hungarian majority, the main minority is the Roma (approx. 2,000).

Total population (2011 census): 21,789
Ethnic groups (2011 census): Identified themselves: 20,878 persons:

- Hungarians: 18,766 (89.88%)
- Gypsies: 1,775 (8.50%)
- Others and indefinable: 337 (1.61%)

Approx. 1,000 persons in Bátonyterenye District did not declare their ethnic group at the 2011 census.

=== Religion ===
Religious adherence in the county according to 2011 census:

- Catholic – 10,453 (Roman Catholic – 10,400; Greek Catholic – 53);
- Reformed – 398;
- Evangelical – 189;
- other religions – 284;
- Non-religious – 4,468;
- Atheism – 219;
- Undeclared – 5,778.

== Gallery ==
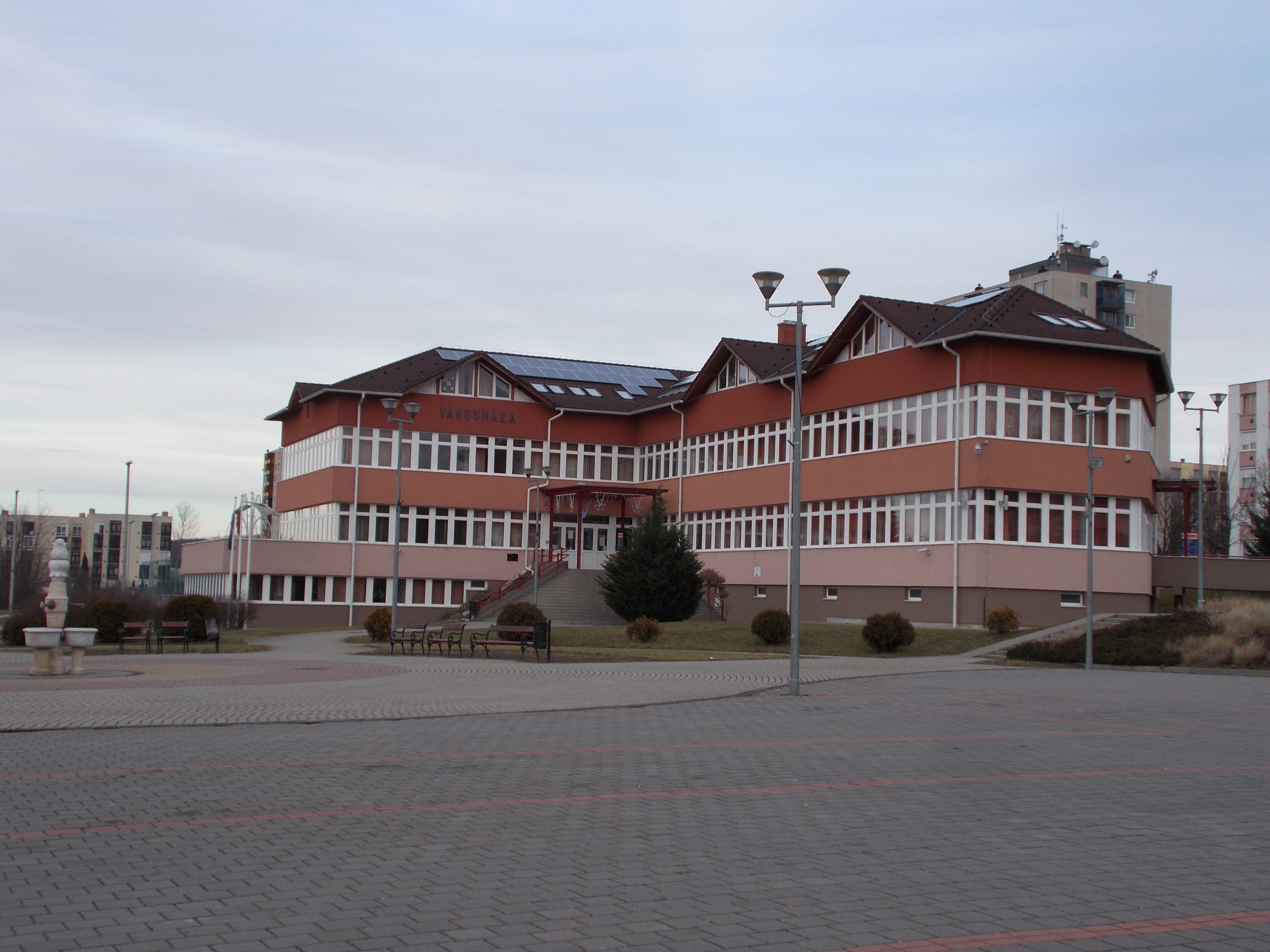
Bátonyterenye, Town Hall

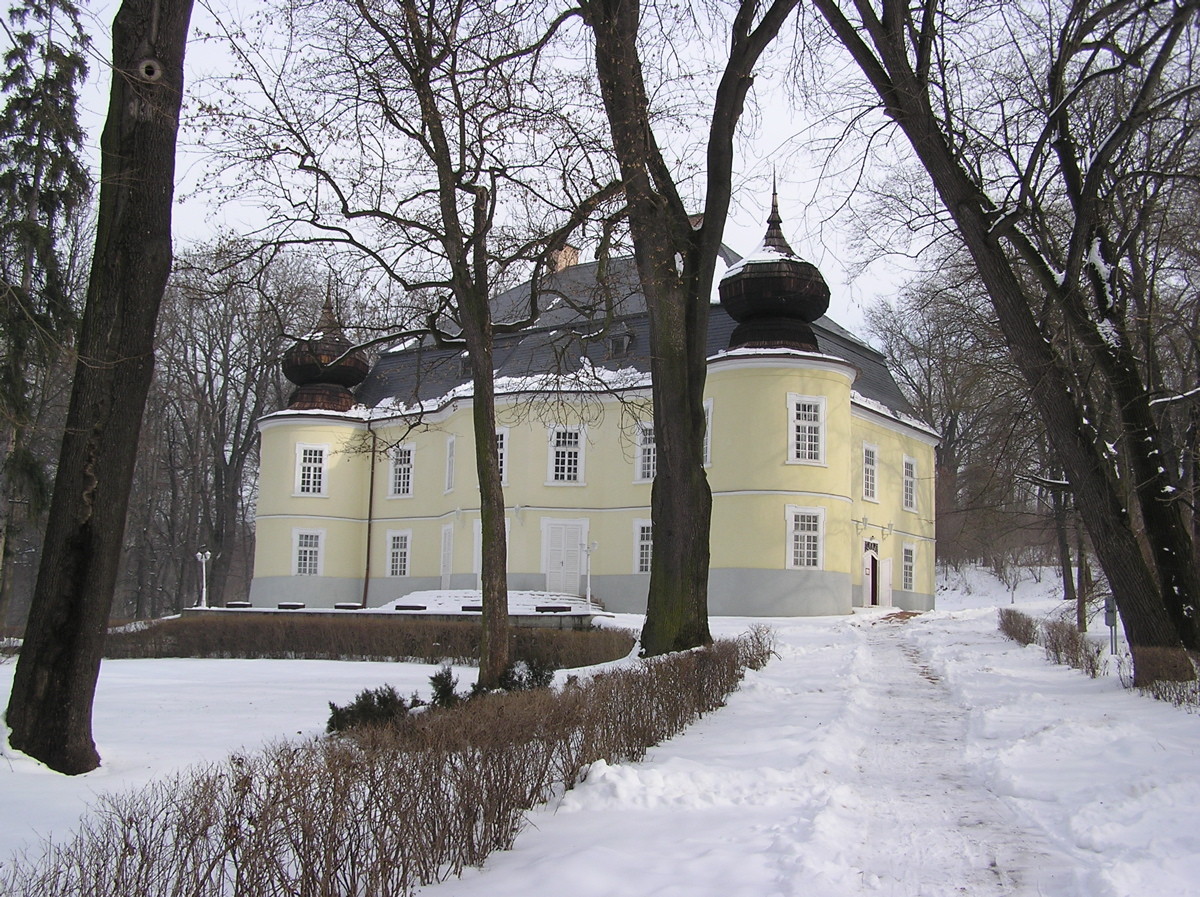
Gyürky-Solymossy Mansion in Bátonyterenye

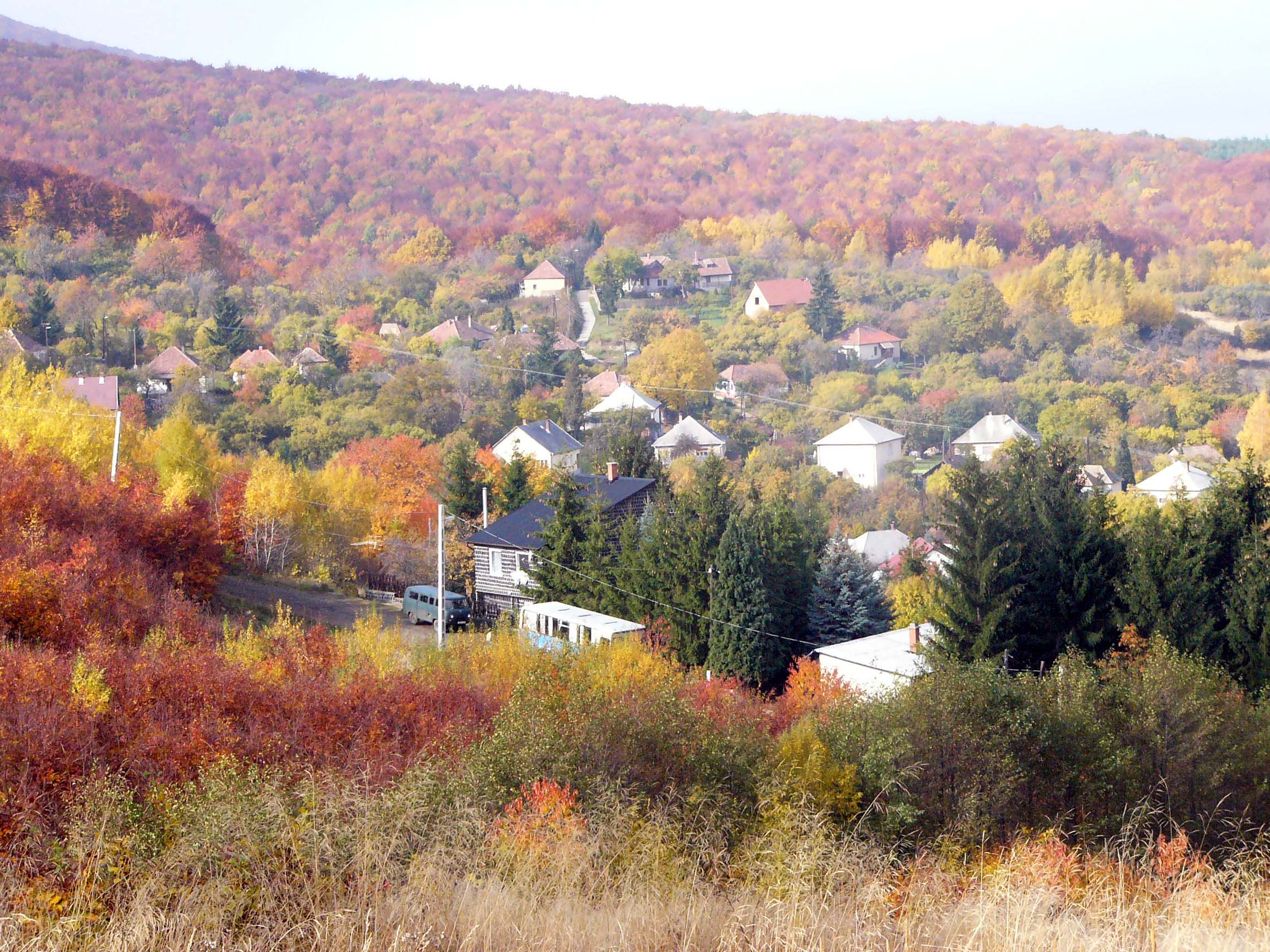
View of Szuha

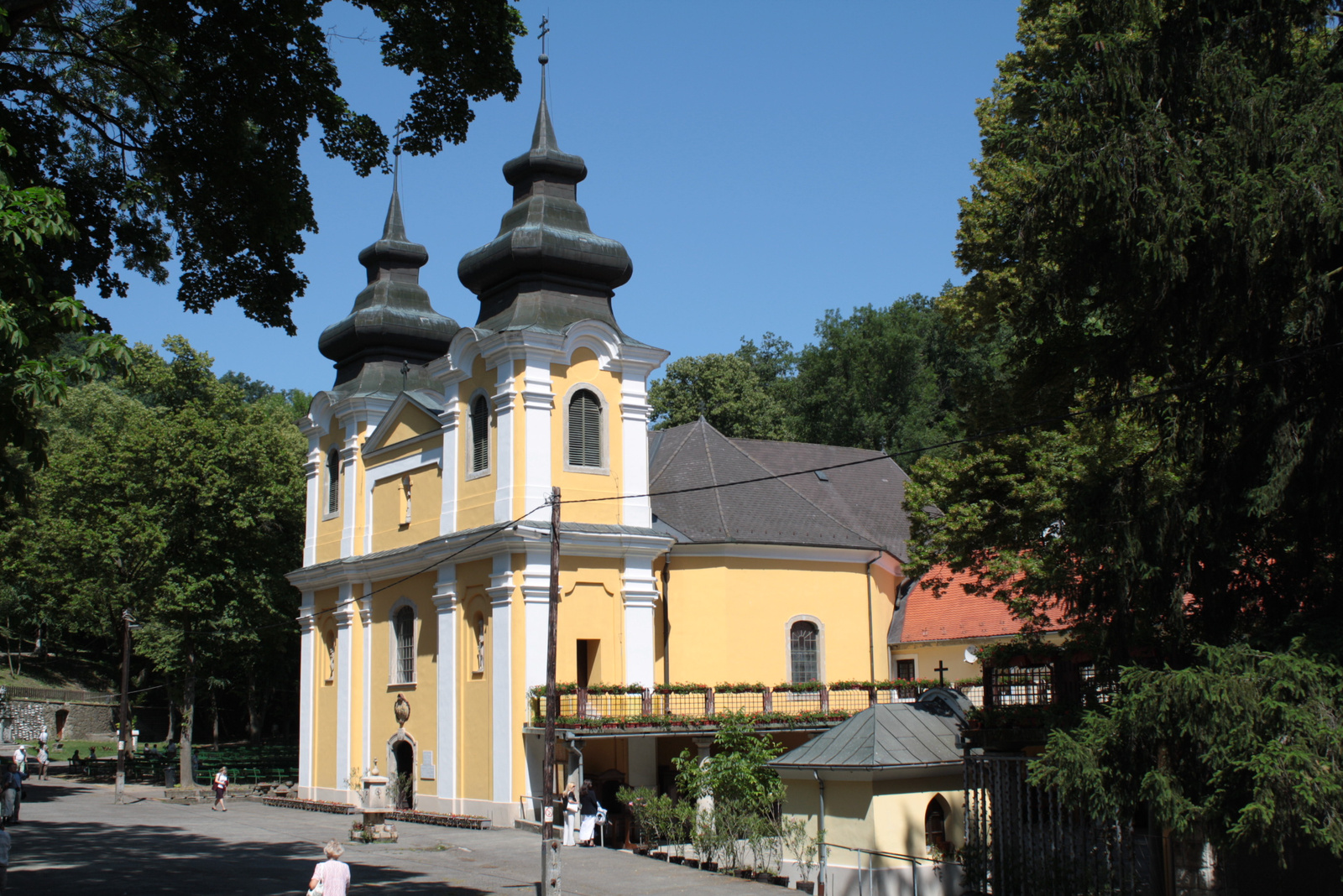
Our Lady Church in Szentkút (Mátraverebély)

== See also ==
- List of cities and towns of Hungary
