= Szuha =

- Village
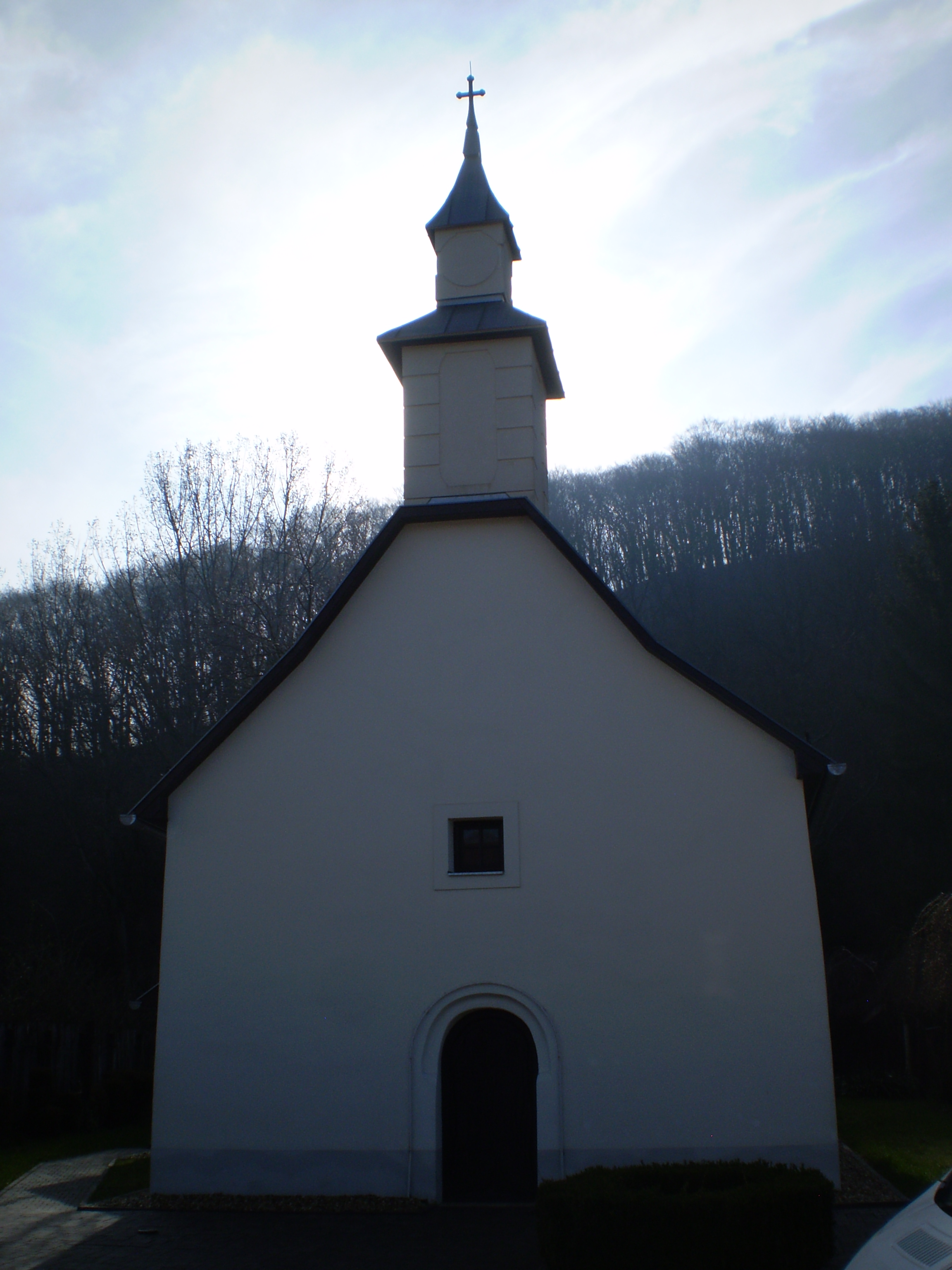
- Nativity of Mary Church

- Coat of arms

- Location in Hungary
- Coordinates: 47°58′19″N 19°54′59″E
- Country: Hungary
- County: Nógrád
- District: Bátonyterenye
- First mentioned: 1441

Government
  - Mayor: Zoltán István Tóth (Fidesz–KDNP)

Area
  - Total: 17.56 km^{2} (6.78 sq mi)

Population (2022)
  - Total: 550
  - Density: 31/km^{2} (81/sq mi)
- Time zone: UTC+1 (CET)
  - Summer (DST): UTC+2 (CEST)
- Postal code: 3154
- Area code: 32
- Website: www.szuha.hu

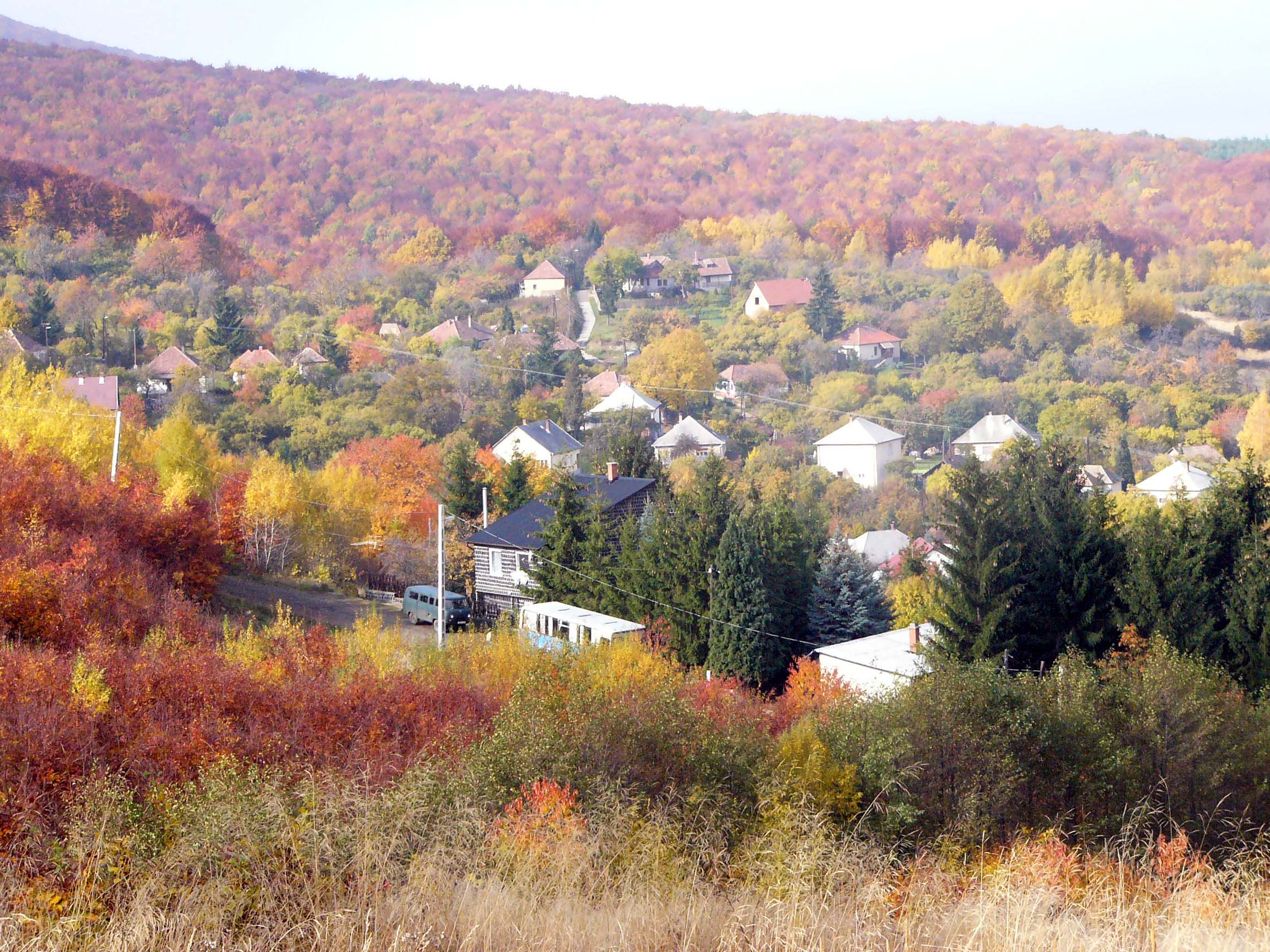
Mátraalmás (Slovak: Suhahuta)

Szuha is a village in Nógrád County, Hungary, in the Mátra mountain range, the bottom of the north side of the Galya-tető peak, beside the Galya creek. As of 2022 census, it has a population of 550 (see Demographics). The village is located 3.4 km from (Nr. 84) Kisterenye–Kál-Kápolna railway line, 11.3 km from the main road 21 and 51.7 km from the M25 expressway. Although the Mátramindszent railway station is the closest, but public transport on the railway line ceased on 3 March 2007. The closest train station with public transport in Bátonyterenye 11.3 km away.

== History ==
The settlement was first mentioned in writing in 1441 in the form Zoha, what comes from the Slavic word suchá (dry). The settlement used to be located further north, but during the Ottoman rule, the population moved up into the forest. In the southeastern part of the village, on a 382 m high hill, there are the remains of a rampart, but the castle is not mentioned in any documents. During the excavations, 12–14. century objects were found. The Nativity of Mary Church was rebuilt in baroque style in 1768. The belfry was erected by the judge András Lajgut in 1868, which was renovated in 1907. The village's folk museum was opened in September 2003, where the furniture related to the Palóc ethnic group, weaving and spinning tools that can be tried out. The resting place at the border of the village is the Gombás fish pond. Szuha is located in a narrow valley, so it has only one street.
A glass huta was built south of the settlement at the foot of Galya-tető in 1777, which was the joint property of the people of Szuha. The 4 families who settled here created Mátraalmás, originally called Szuhahuta. The population was of mixed German, Polish and Slovak origin, they were engaged in glass and potash production, wood extraction and processing. After the closure of the glass huta in 1830, the clay began to be fired and bricks were produced. They traded in wooden tools, agricultural implements and furnitures. A school operated in Szuhahuta in two halls between 1914 and 1972. Within the framework of the Czechoslovak–Hungarian population exchange agreement, 70% of the Slovak population was displaced from Szuhahuta in 1947. The Dorogháza coal mine, located 8.3 km away, provided employment opportunities for the population from 1949. Szuhahuta was renamed Mátraalmás in 1962. The 4.5 km road connecting Mátraalmás with Galya-tető is closed to car traffic and can only be used by bicycle or on foot.

== Demographics ==
According the 2022 census, 93.2% of the population were of Hungarian ethnicity, 4.8% were Slovak, 1.0% were German and 6.8% were did not wish to answer. The religious distribution was as follows: 51.5% Roman Catholic, 2.4% Calvinist, 0.6% Lutheran, 11.0% non-denominational, and 32.3% did not wish to answer. The Slovaks have a local nationality government. 67 people live in Mátraalmás and 7 beside of the Gombás lake recreation area 5.8 and 4.3 km far from the village centre, these places are other inner areas. Another 13 people are living in 2 farms.

Population by years:

Year	1870	1880	1890	1900	1910	1920	1930	1941
Population	624	602	714	807	911	1062	1233	1325
Year	1949	1960	1970	1980	1990	2001	2011	2022
Population	1026	1088	1107	1045	904	771	619	550
Mátraalmás	576	250	?	?	142	133	?	67

== Politics ==
Mayors since 1990:

- 1990–1998: József Bata (independent)
- 1998–2010: Mrs. Tibor Kun (independent)
- 2010–: Zoltán István Tóth (Fidesz–KDNP)
