= Kecskés (river) =

Location
- Country: Hungary

Physical characteristics
- Source
  - location: Cserhát, Hungary
  - elevation: 490 m (1,610 ft)
- Mouth
  - location: Zagyva at Bátonyterenye
  - coordinates: 47°58′43″N 19°48′39″E

Basin features
- Progression: Zagyva→ Tisza→ Danube→ Black Sea

The Kecskés (Hungarian: Kecskés-patak) is a river in Nógrád County, in northern Hungary. It originates at 490 metres above sea level in the Cserhát range, southeast of Mátraverebély, and flows northward to Bátonyterenye, where it joins the Zagyva.

== Settlements on the banks ==
- Mátraverebély
- Bátonyterenye
