= Henrik Fazola =

German-born Hungarian locksmith master and factory owner (1730-1779)

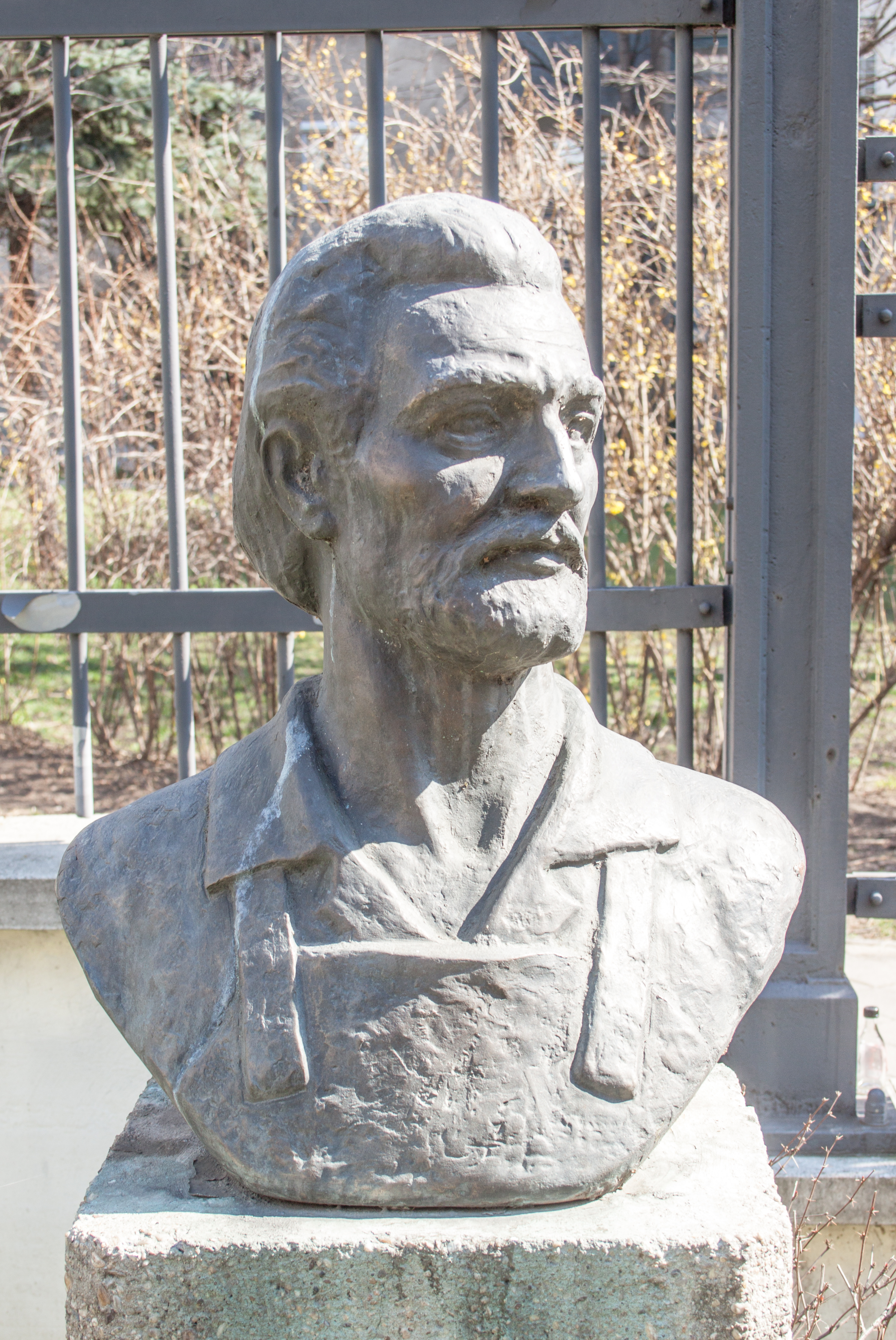
- Bust of Henrik Fazola, self-made, Foundry Museum, Budapest

Henrik Fazola (German: Heinrich Fasola or Fassola) (1730 – 16 April 1779) was a German-born Hungarian locksmith master, a factory owner and one of the first representatives of industrial stock in Royal Hungary. He lived in the city of Eger for some years, during which period he created his most famous wrought iron works. Furthermore, he found iron in the Bükk Mountains and built the first iron furnace in the area, establishing the basis of metallurgy in the region.

== Life ==
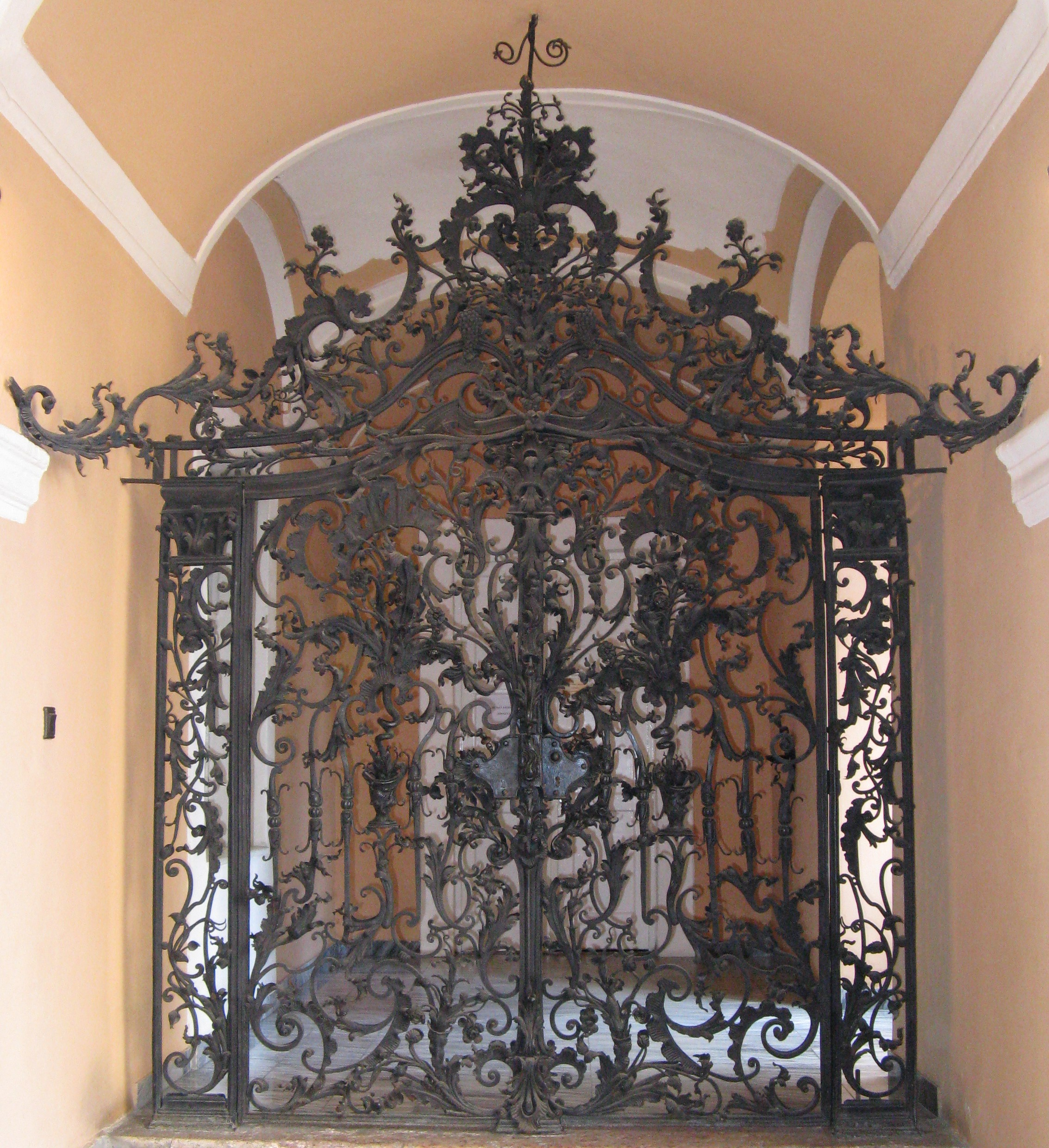
one gate of the set of Fazola gates in Eger

Henrik Fazola was born in 1730 to a wealthy family in Würzburg where he became an acknowledged smith with his younger brother, Lénart Fazola. They visited some Western-European countries in order to learn more about their profession and improve themselves to a higher level. In 1741, Maria Theresa, the Queen of Hungary nominated Ferenc Barkóczy as the bishop of Eger who invited a lot of foreign masters for his developer constructions in the city, inter alia the avowed smith, Henrik Fazola from Würzburg, in 1758. As he did the orders of the bishop at the highest artistic quality, he got more and major errands from the Church official and became a well-off citizen of Eger. During this period, he made the wrought iron gates and lunette of the County Hall of Eger with grapes and crests.

Henrik Fazola started the search for iron, the commodity of his job in the area of Eger and found it in the Bükk Mountains. He began to invest his money, gained from his works, in mining; however, he did not want to give up fulfilling the smith orders, so he called for his brother, Lénárt in 1768 to take over his locksmith workshop. Their mother had already lived with Henrik in Royal Hungary. Henrik Fazola took a widow, Anna Mária Linczin to wife in 1767 whose fortune gave stability to him, but she died soon, in 1772. Then he married the maiden Tekla Karl who became the mother of his two children: Frigyes and Borbála. The second wife had considerable financial background too which helped the dreams of the husband come true.

The constructor used all of his money to utilize the founded iron in the Bükk Mountains; moreover, to be able to start iron production with the planned iron furnace and iron foundries in Garadna and in the dale of the Szinva stream. The Queens Announcement in 1770 let him built a smelter with the help of professional Styrian and Hungarian metallurgists who were the first inhabitants of the new settlements of Ómassa and Hámor. The smelter began to work in 1772 and in a few years it gained fame across the country. This success of iron production in the region demanded Henrik Fazolas health declension because he had to work a lot since he did not have the financial support of the state. He died on 16 April 1779 in Hámor, his ashes are somewhere in the cemetery of the village.

== Legacy ==
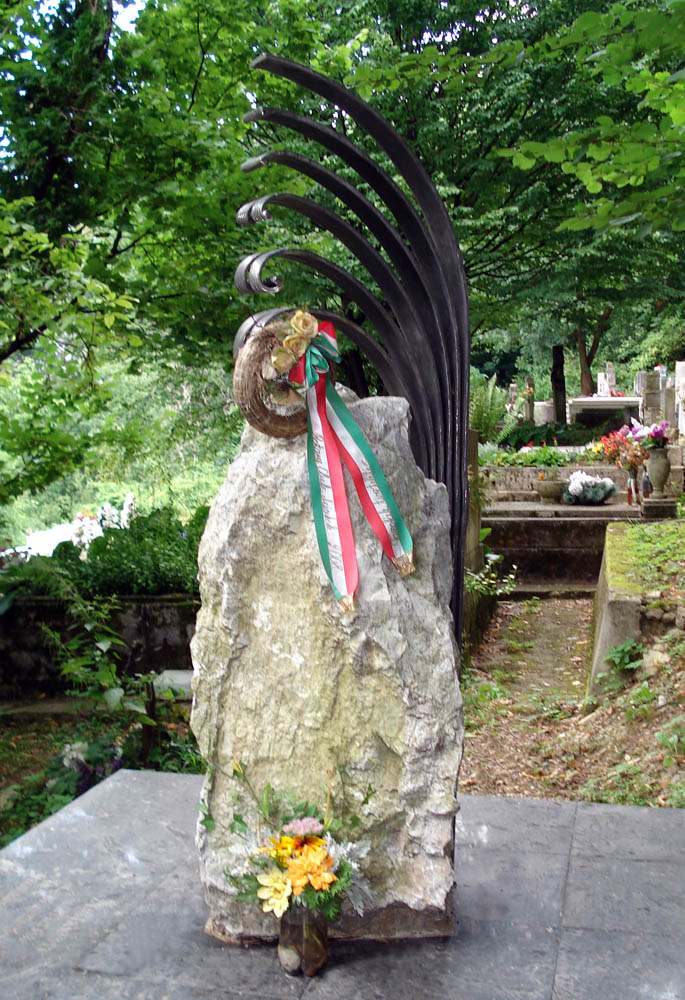
Fazola tomb in Miskolc

After the death of Henrik Fazola, with the strong help of his mother, Tekla Karl, by using all his sources and power to improve the iron production, Frigyes Fazola became a worthy successor of his father.

Henrik Fazola gave a new industrial territory to the country by finding and producing iron what later became the basis of the territory during the railway constructions of Austria-Hungary in the 19th century and after the Treaty of Trianon when most of the mines were disannexed from Hungary and the city of Miskolc emerged as the leader industrial settlement of the region.

== Sources ==
- Pereházy, Károly: "Fazola Henrik". In: Nagy, Ferenc (ed.): Magyar tudóslexikon A-tól Zs-ig. Budapest: Better; MTESZ; OMIKK. 1997. p. 284. ISBN 963-85433-5-3
