= Galga =

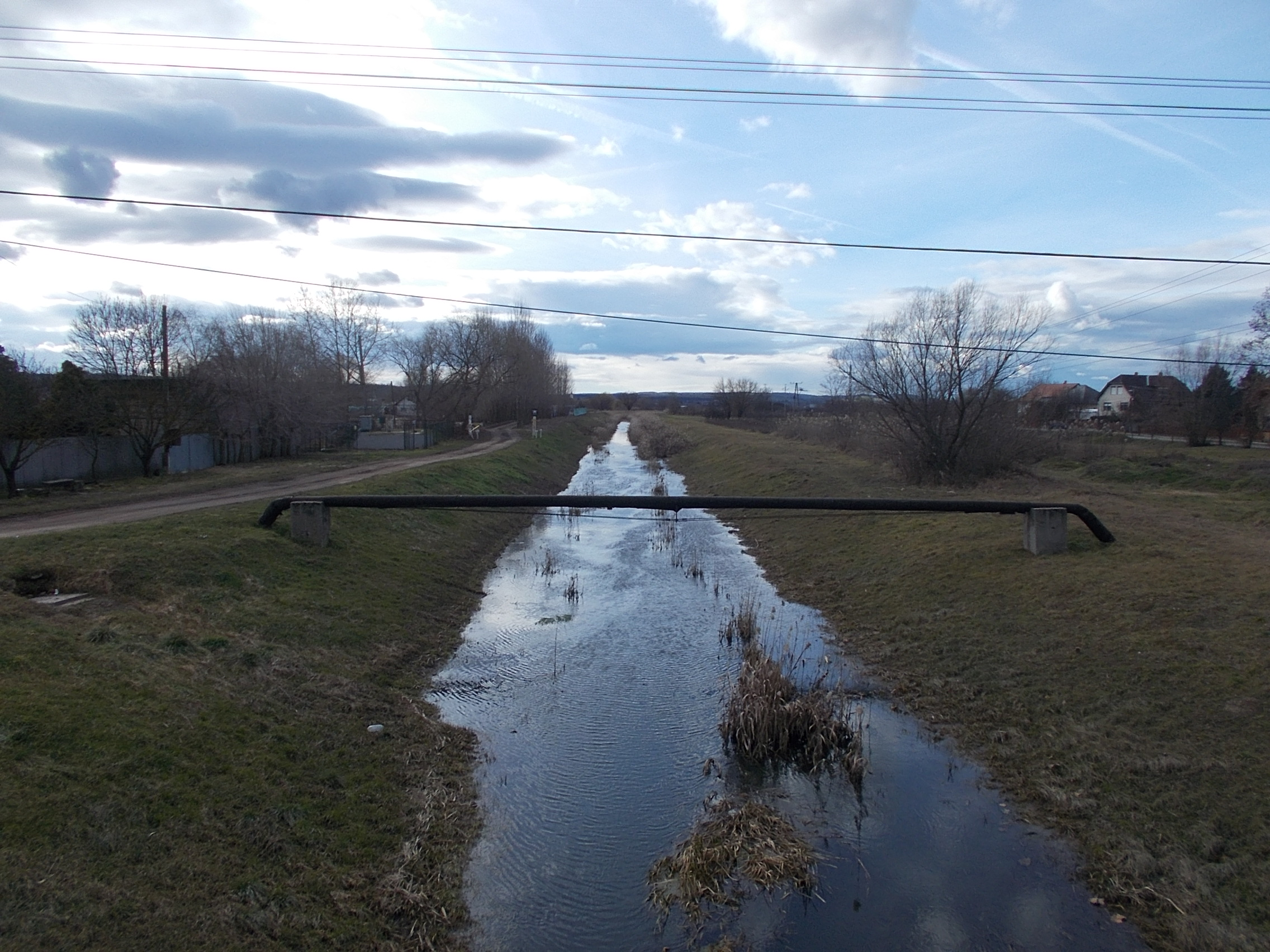

Location
- Country: Hungary

Physical characteristics
- Source
  - location: Cserhát mountains near Becske
- Mouth
  - location: Zagyva (near Jászfényszaru)
  - coordinates: 47.5523°N 19.7159°E
- Length: 58 km (36 mi)
- Basin size: 568 km^{2} (219 sq mi)
- Discharge
  - average: 0.6 m^{3}/s (21 cu ft/s)

Basin features
- Progression: Zagyva→ Tisza→ Danube→ Black Sea

The Galga is a right tributary of the river Zagyva in the Cserhát mountains and the Great Hungarian Plain, Hungary. It originates at Becske, Nógrád County, at the Hill Szandai. The river flows into the Zagyva at Jászfényszaru.

Because of the major disasters caused by the river overflowing in the 1970s, it became regulated by the Aszód-based GAVIT, which is responsible for the Galga and all of the streams flowing into the river.
