= Nemti =

- Village
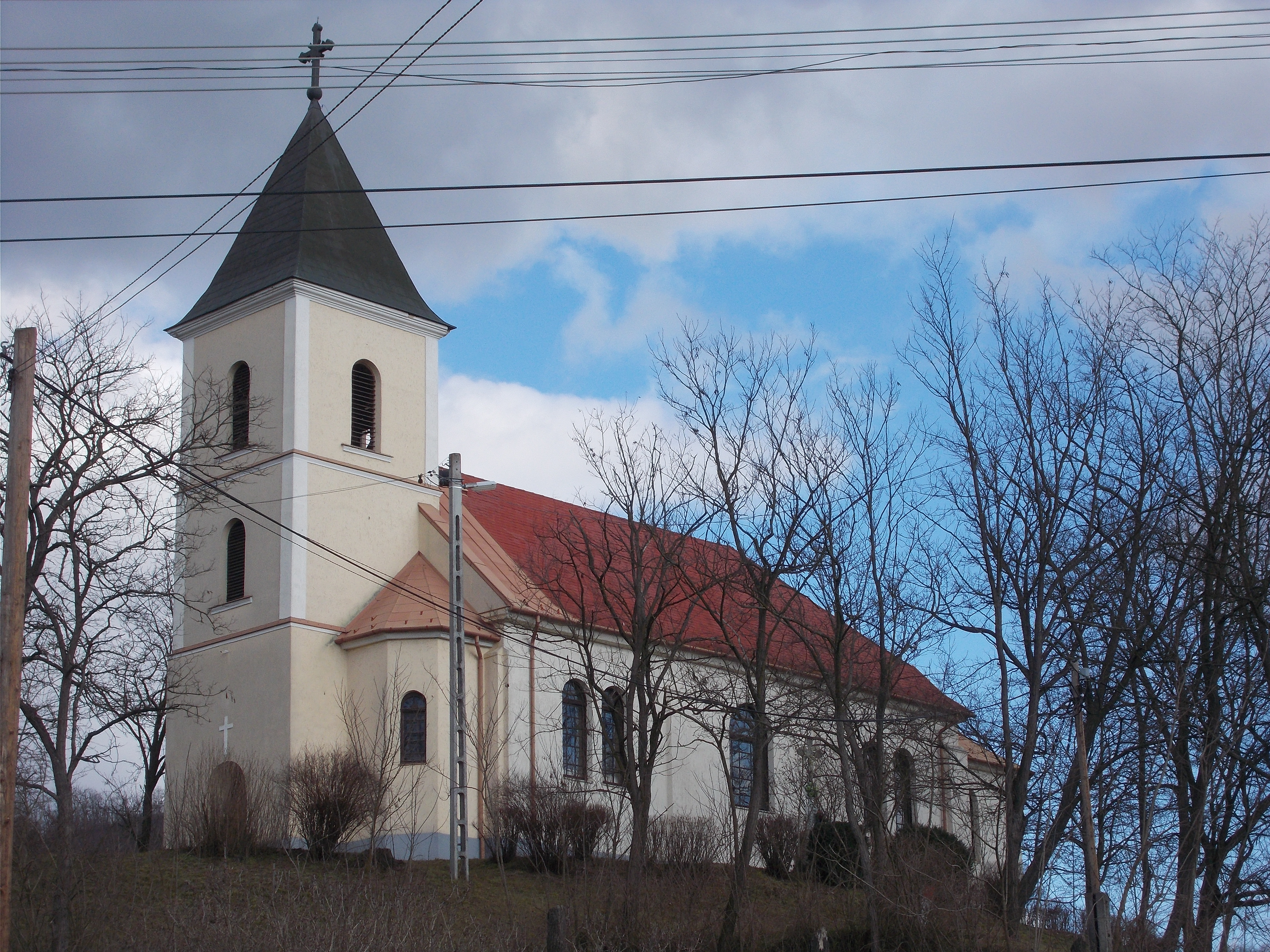
- Saint Michael church

- Location in Hungary
- Coordinates: 48°00′28″N 19°54′19″E
- Country: Hungary
- County: Nógrád
- District: Bátonyterenye
- First mentioned: 1227

Government
  - Mayor: Máté Morvai, Dr. (Ind.)

Area
  - Total: 11.06 km^{2} (4.27 sq mi)

Population (2022)
  - Total: 675
  - Density: 61.0/km^{2} (158/sq mi)
- Time zone: UTC+1 (CET)
  - Summer (DST): UTC+2 (CEST)
- Postal code: 3152
- Area code: 32
- Website: www.nemti.hu

Nemti is a village in Nógrád County, Hungary, beside the Zagyva river. As of 2022 census, it has a population of 675 (see Demographics). The village is located beside the (Nr. 84) Kisterenye–Kál-Kápolna railway line, 6.6 km from the main road 21 and 49.0 km from the M3 motorway. Although the settlement has its own railway stop, but public transport on the railway line ceased on 3 March 2007. The closest train station with public transport in Bátonyterenye 6.6 km away.

== History ==
Nemti's name is mentioned for the first time in a certificate in 1227, in its current form. Péter Nemti was the owner of the settlement in 1331. The papal tithe list of 1332-37 already mentions a church named after Saint Martin. King Sigismund donated the village to the Derencsényi family in 1413. It was owned by Sigismund Karthaly in 1548. The village was mentioned as "Németi" in an Ottoman tax census in 1579. Only 2 in 1663-64, 7 in 1715, and 9 Slovak families lived in 1720 in Nemti. The settlement was owned by Count Antal Grassalkovich in 1770, and then by Count György Károlyi after 1840. Clay mining began at the beginning of the 20th century. 21 of its 991 inhabitants were Slovaks in 1910, and in these years the settlement's kindergarten, which still operates today, was established. Ilonabánya, which until 1939 belonged to Kisterenye, was annexed by Nemti. A revolutionary workers' council was formed in the mine in 1956, which was followed by retaliation. After 1990 the mine was closed and in the settlement, a mining museum were established. And a folk museum presenting the Palóc traditions. The village is part of the Novohrad-Nógrád Geopark with the clay mine.

== Demographics ==
According the 2022 census, 83.8% of the population were of Hungarian ethnicity, 4.1% were Gypsies, 0.6% German, 0.5% Ukrainian and 16.0% were did not wish to answer. The religious distribution was as follows: 24.9% Roman Catholic, 2.4% Calvinist, 0.5% Lutheran, 19.5% non-denominational, and 50.3% did not wish to answer. The Gypsies have a local nationality government. 661 people live in the village and only one person live in a farm.

Population by years:

Year	1870	1880	1890	1900	1910	1920	1930	1941
Population	420	535	592	705	800	852	945	1065
Year	1949	1960	1970	1980	1990	2001	2011	2022
Population	1100	1189	1182	1109	950	833	765	675

== Politics ==
Mayors since 1990:

- 1990–1994: Sándor Táborita (independent)
- 1994–2002: Nándor Pilmayer (independent until 1998, then supported by the Fidesz, FKgP, MDF, KDNP, MDNP and the MKDSZ)
- 2002–2010: Róbert Erős (independent)
- 2010–2011: Sándor Táborita (independent)
- 2011–2014: Róbert Erős (independent)
- 2014–2024: Mrs. István Széll (independent)
- 2024–: Máté Morvai, Dr. (independent)

A unique relation existed between Nemti and neighbouring village Dorogháza between 2000 and 2002, when the mayor of Dorogháza was the wife of the Nemti's mayor.
