= Zagyva =

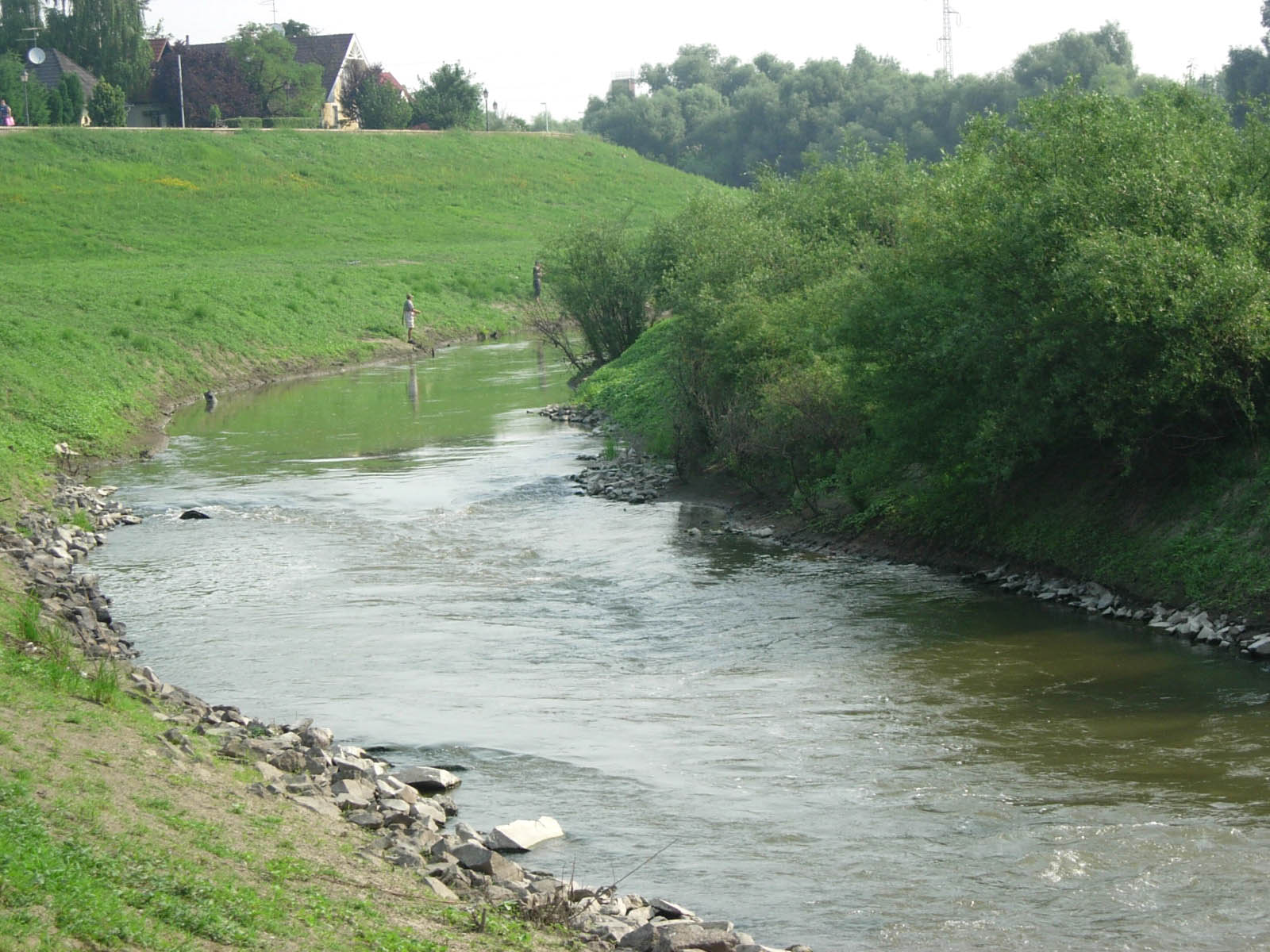
- The Zagyva near Szolnok

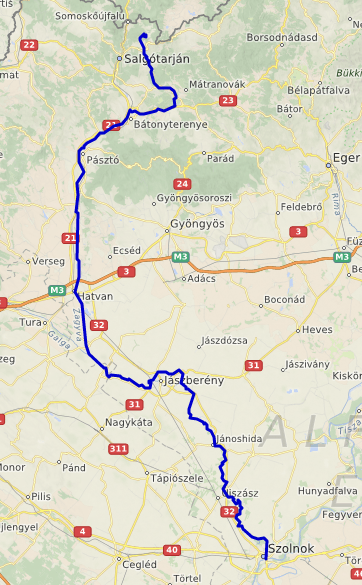

Location
- Country: Hungary

Physical characteristics
- Source: Nógrád County
- Mouth
  - location: Tisza in Szolnok
  - coordinates: 47.1724°N 20.2023°E
- Length: 179 km (111 mi)
- Basin size: 5,677 km^{2} (2,192 sq mi)
- Discharge
  - average: 9 m^{3}/s (320 cu ft/s)

Basin features
- Progression: Tisza→ Danube→ Black Sea
- Tributaries
  - right: Galga

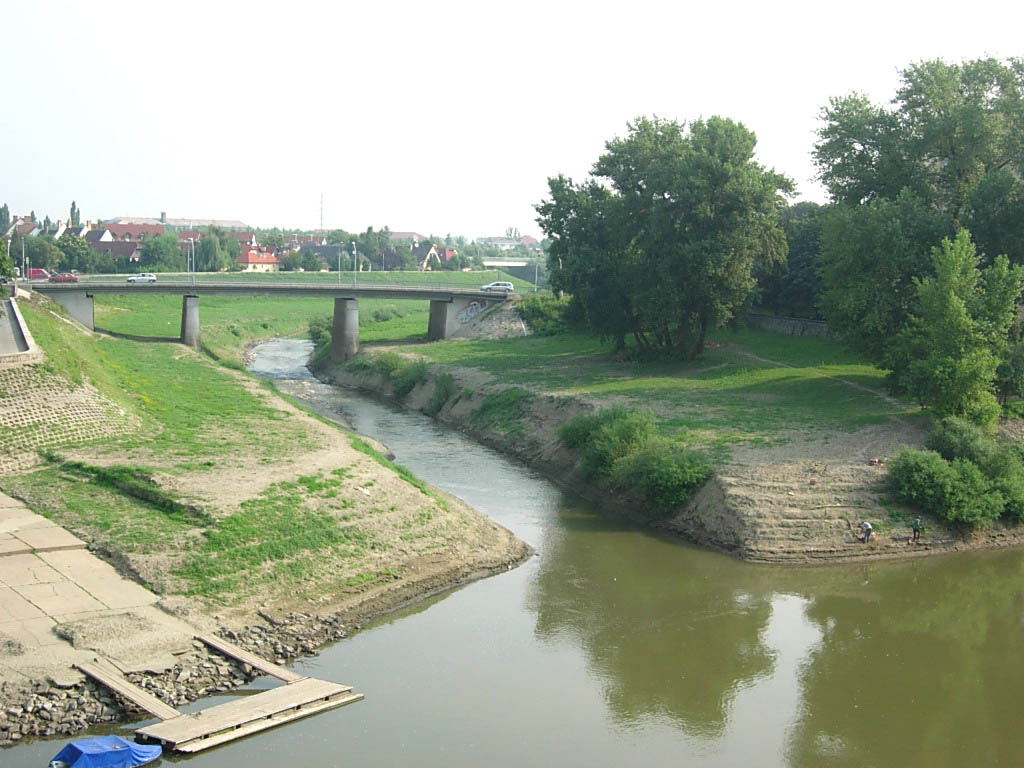
The Zagyva meets the Tisza River in Szolnok.

The Zagyva is a river in Hungary. This 179 km long river drains a basin of 5,677 km^{2}. The source is near Salgótarján in Nógrád county. It flows through the towns of Bátonyterenye, Pásztó, Hatvan and Jászberény and flows into the Tisza at Szolnok. Average discharge at Szolnok is 9 m^{3}/s. The Zagyva is the longest river in Hungary that has both its source and its confluence within the country's borders.

== Etymology ==
The name comes from Slavic sadjati: to settle (sediments). *Sadzava: a river that carries many sediments, see i.e. Czech Sázava.

In Hungarian, the name means 'muddled' (zagyvál(ni): 'to muddle').

== Tributaries ==
The following rivers are tributaries to the river Zagyva (from source to mouth):

- Left: Iványi, Mindszenti, Galya, Lengyendi, Kecskés
- Right: Galga
