= Mátramindszent =

- Village
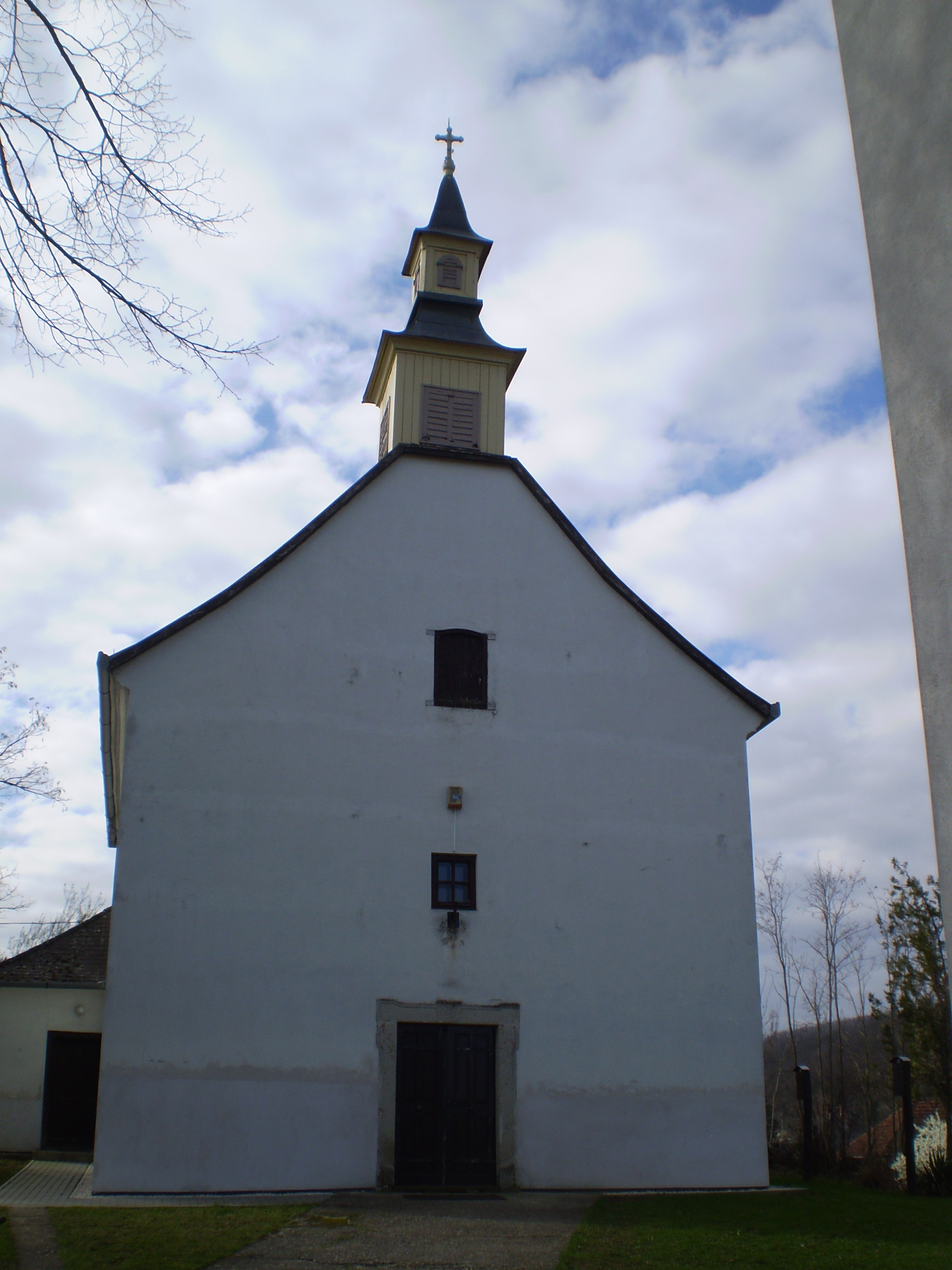
- All Saints' church

- Coat of arms

- Location in Hungary
- Coordinates: 47°59′00″N 19°55′58″E
- Country: Hungary
- County: Nógrád
- District: Bátonyterenye
- First mentioned: 1546

Government
  - Mayor: János Horváth (Fidesz–KDNP)

Area
  - Total: 16.73 km^{2} (6.46 sq mi)

Population (2022)
  - Total: 707
  - Density: 42.3/km^{2} (109/sq mi)
- Time zone: UTC+1 (CET)
  - Summer (DST): UTC+2 (CEST)
- Postal code: 3155
- Area code: 32
- Website: www.matramindszent.hu

Mátramindszent is a village in Nógrád County, Hungary, in the Mátra mountain range, at the bottom of the north side of the Galya-tető peak. The Mindszenti creek flows through the settlement. As of 2022 census, it has a population of 707 (see Demographics). The village is located 2.0 km from (Nr. 84) Kisterenye–Kál-Kápolna railway line, 11.7 km from the main road 21 and 52.1 km from the M25 expressway. Although the settlement has its own railway station, but public transport on the railway line ceased on 3 March 2007. The closest train station with public transport in Bátonyterenye is 11.7 km away.

== History ==
On the hill called Kereszt-lapos, finds from the Chalcolithic and Bronze Age were found, which suggests a passing traffic. The village of Ivány was established next to the Iváni creek, which was mentioned for the first time in 1296. The owners of the settlement belonged to the Bakos clan. Above the settlement on a 320 m high hill stood a castle, which was called Óvár. The oval inner castle was protected from the north by a semicircular outer castle, the ramparts of which are still unexcavated and nothing ruins remained. The first documented mention of Mátramindszent is from 1546 under the name Mindszent, the owners are the Sebek family and Eger castle captain Baron István Dobó. During the siege of Eger in 1552, the Turks burned the village, at that time there were 9 portas. In 1564, there were 4 portas, but only 6 families lived in the village of Ivány. 10 serf families lived in the village in the 17th century. By the end of the 18th century, the number of families varies between 15 and 20. The population rose above 300–400 in the 19th century. 400 people were counted in 54 houses in 1851. The landowners were the Szmercsányi, Kevitchy, Kutkay, Marso, Gyürky, Solymosy, and Wagner families. A blacksmith's workshop and a mill shop were established in the settlement. In the 1810s, 58 students were enrolled in the village school. The leaders of the settlement came from the Hajas family for a hundred years. After the construction of the railway in 1887, the population began to grow. It was named Mátramindszent in 1890, to distinguish it from the 5 Hungarian settlements with similar names.
The population peaked at 1400 people in 1950, when it was transferred from Heves to Nógrád county. The Mátragyöngye Cooperatives tried to keep the population of the settlement in place by producing loading sheets, washers and packaging elements at the site. The opening of the coal mine in Dorogháza, 9 km away, in 1949 meant good job opportunities for the population of the village, which can therefore be called a mining village. After the mine closed in the 1970s, long-distance commuting began. The production textile cooperative switched to animal husbandry in the 1990s: they raised cattle and produced milk. Forestry has begun large-scale logging. Despite the deposits of red and gray clay in the territory of the settlement, no clay mine was established. The unemployment in 2020 was 18%.
The settlement's Roman Catholic church was built in the 1750s, presumably on medieval remains, but was rebuilt in 1789. The altar of the baroque-style All Saints' church is made of wood with colorfully painted marble and gold decorations. The altarpiece depicts the Adoration of the Magi. The altar decorated with the statues of St. Andrew, St. Peter, St. Stephen, St. Paul, St. John, St. Ladislaus, St. Martin, St. Elizabeth of Hungary, St. Emerich, St. Anthony, St. Wendelin, St. George and St. Michael. Church equipment 18–19. century. Next to the train station in 2007 built a barracks chapel called the Shelter of the Blessed Lady, dedicated to the victims of communism. A folk museum was created in 2010 to show the old village life.

== Demographics ==
According the 2022 census, 87.9% of the population were of Hungarian ethnicity, 11.0% were Gypsies and 11.9% were did not wish to answer. The religious distribution was as follows: 47.8% Roman Catholic, 3.4% Calvinist, 0.6% Lutheran, 10.3% non-denominational, and 34.9% did not wish to answer. The Gypsies have a local nationality government. No population in farms, but 19 inhabitants live around the railway station, where located an other inner area.

Population by years:

Year	1870	1880	1890	1900	1910	1920	1930	1941
Population	537	487	601	678	746	839	923	1043
Year	1949	1960	1970	1980	1990	2001	2011	2022
Population	1095	1193	1290	1211	1080	971	893	707

== Politics ==
Mayors since 1990:

- 1990–2010: Gábor Molnár (independent)
- 2010–: János Horváth (Fidesz–KDNP)
