= Nógrád County 1st constituency =

Hungarian national legislative constituency

Nógrád County 1st constituency (Salgótarján)
- Constituency for the National Assembly
- Location of Nógrád county 01 within Nógrád county

- Location of Nógrád county within Hungary
- County: Nógrád
- Electorate: 77,217 (2018)
- Major settlements: Salgótarján

Current constituency
- Created: 2011
- Party: Tisza Party
- Member: Zoltán Péter Szafkó
- Created from: Constituency no. 1; Constituency no. 2; Constituency no. 3
- Elected: 2026

The 1st constituency of Nógrád County (Hungarian: Nógrád megyei 01. számú országgyűlési egyéni választókerület) is one of the single member constituencies of the National Assembly, the national legislature of Hungary. The constituency standard abbreviation: Nógrád 01. OEVK.

Since 2026, it has been represented by Zoltán Péter Szafkó of the Tisza Party.

== Geography ==
The 1st constituency is located in the eastern part of Nógrád County.

=== List of municipalities ===
The constituency includes the following municipalities:

1. Alsótold
2. Bárna
3. Bátonyterenye
4. Bokor
5. Buják
6. Cered
7. Csécse
8. Cserhátszentiván
9. Dorogháza
10. Ecseg
11. Egyházasdengeleg
12. Felsőtold
13. Garáb
14. Héhalom
15. Hollókő
16. Jobbágyi
17. Kazár
18. Kisbágyon
19. Kisbárkány
20. Kishartyán
21. Kozárd
22. Kutasó
23. Lucfalva
24. Márkháza
25. Mátramindszent
26. Mátranovák
27. Mátraszele
28. Mátraszőlős
29. Mátraterenye
30. Mátraverebély
31. Nagybárkány
32. Nagykeresztúr
33. Nemti
34. Palotás
35. Pásztó
36. Rákóczibánya
37. Salgótarján
38. Sámsonháza
39. Somoskőújfalu
40. Sóshartyán
41. Szarvasgede
42. Szilaspogony
43. Szuha
44. Szurdokpüspöki
45. Tar
46. Vizslás
47. Zabar

== History ==
The current 1st constituency of Nógrád County was created in 2011 and contains the pre-2011 1st constituency and part of the pre-2011 2nd and 3rd constituencies of Nógrád County. Its borders have not changed since its creation.

== Members ==
The constituency was first represented by Zsolt Becsó of the Fidesz from 2014 to 2018. Károly Becsó of the Fidesz was elected in 2018. In the 2026 election, Zoltán Péter Szafkó of the Tisza Party was elected representative.

Election	Member	Party	%
2014	Zsolt Becsó	Fidesz	37.6
2018	Károly Becsó	Fidesz	47.3
2022	Zsolt Becsó	Fidesz	53.9
2026	Zoltán Péter Szafkó	TISZA	52.17
