= Pásztó District =

Coordinates: 47.8667°N 19.6167°E

Pásztó District Pásztói járás
- Districts of Hungary
- Coat of arms

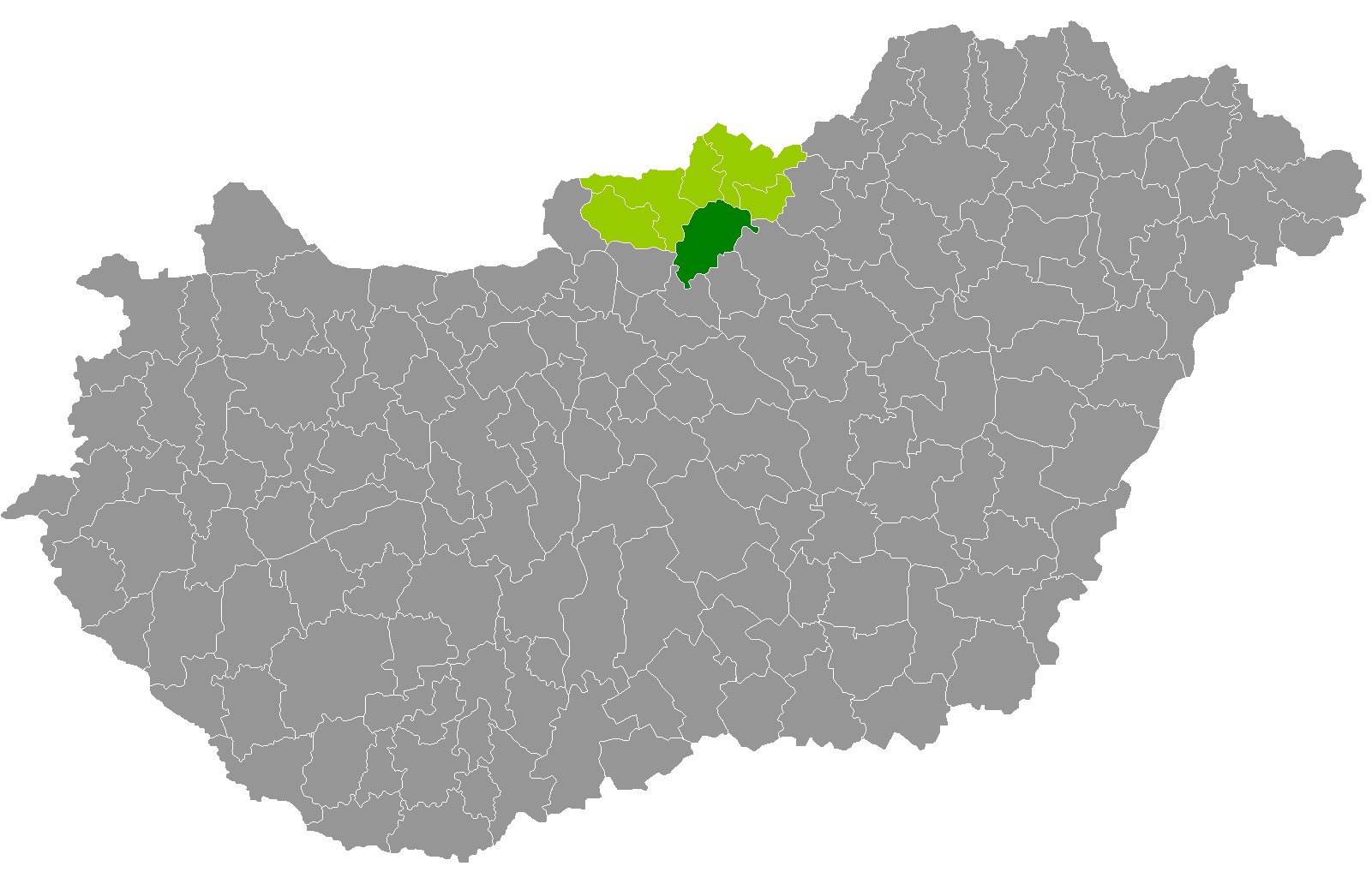
- Pásztó District within Hungary and Nógrád County.
- Country: Hungary
- County: Nógrád
- District seat: Pásztó

Area
  - Total: 551.56 km^{2} (212.96 sq mi)
  - Rank: 1st in Nógrád

Population (2011 census)
  - Total: 31,729
  - Rank: 3rd in Nógrád
  - Density: 58/km^{2} (150/sq mi)

Pásztó (Hungarian: Pásztói járás) is a district in south-eastern part of Nógrád County. Pásztó is also the name of the town where the district seat is found. The district is located in the Northern Hungary Statistical Region.

== Geography ==
Pásztó District borders with Szécsény District, Salgótarján District and Bátonyterenye District to the north, Gyöngyös District and Hatvan District (Heves County) to the east, Aszód District (Pest County) to the south, Vác District (Pest County) and Balassagyarmat District to the west. The number of the inhabited places in Pásztó District is 26.

== Municipalities ==
The district has 1 town and 25 villages. (ordered by population, as of 1 January 2013)

- Alsótold (232)
- Bér (360)
- Bokor (131)
- Buják (2,187)
- Csécse (925)
- Cserhátszentiván (125)
- Ecseg (1,178)
- Egyházasdengeleg (484)
- Erdőkürt (486)
- Erdőtarcsa (504)
- Felsőtold (125)
- Garáb (57)
- Héhalom (967)
- Jobbágyi (2,137)
- Kálló (1,458)
- Kisbágyon (421)
- Kozárd (167)
- Kutasó (91)
- Mátraszőlős (1,603)
- Palotás (1,616)
- **Pásztó** (9,559) – district seat
- Szarvasgede (388)
- Szirák (1,203)
- Szurdokpüspöki (1,939)
- Tar (1,892)
- Vanyarc (1,262)

The bolded municipality is the city.

== Demographics ==
Religion in Pásztó District (2011 census)
1. Catholic Church (58.3%)
2. Greek Catholicism (0.20%)
3. Lutheranism (6.30%)
4. Calvinism (1.50%)
5. Other religions (2.00%)
6. Non-religious (8.60%)
7. Atheists (0.70%)
8. Undeclared (22.4%)

In 2011, it had a population of 31,729 and the population density was 58/km².

Year	County population	Change
2011	31,729	n/a

=== Ethnicity ===
Besides the Hungarian majority, the main minorities are the Roma (approx. 3,000), Slovak (650) and German (100).

Total population (2011 census): 31,729
Ethnic groups (2011 census): Identified themselves: 31,532 persons:

- Hungarians: 27,673 (87.76%)
- Gypsies: 2,874 (9.11%)
- Slovaks: 630 (2.00%)
- Others and indefinable: 355 (1.13%)

Approx. 200 persons in Pásztó District did not declare their ethnic group at the 2011 census.

=== Religion ===
Religious adherence in the county according to 2011 census:

- Catholic – 18,594 (Roman Catholic – 18,513; Greek Catholic – 79);
- Evangelical – 2,014;
- Reformed – 467;
- other religions – 620;
- Non-religious – 2,731;
- Atheism – 212;
- Undeclared – 7,091.

== Gallery ==
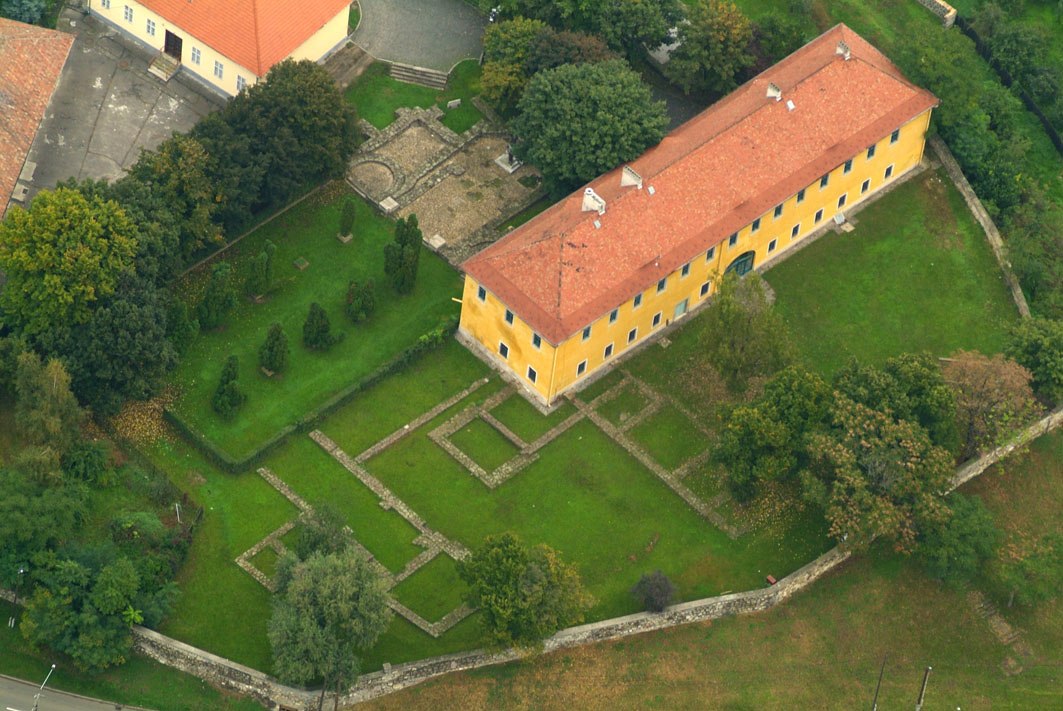
Pásztó, the district seat

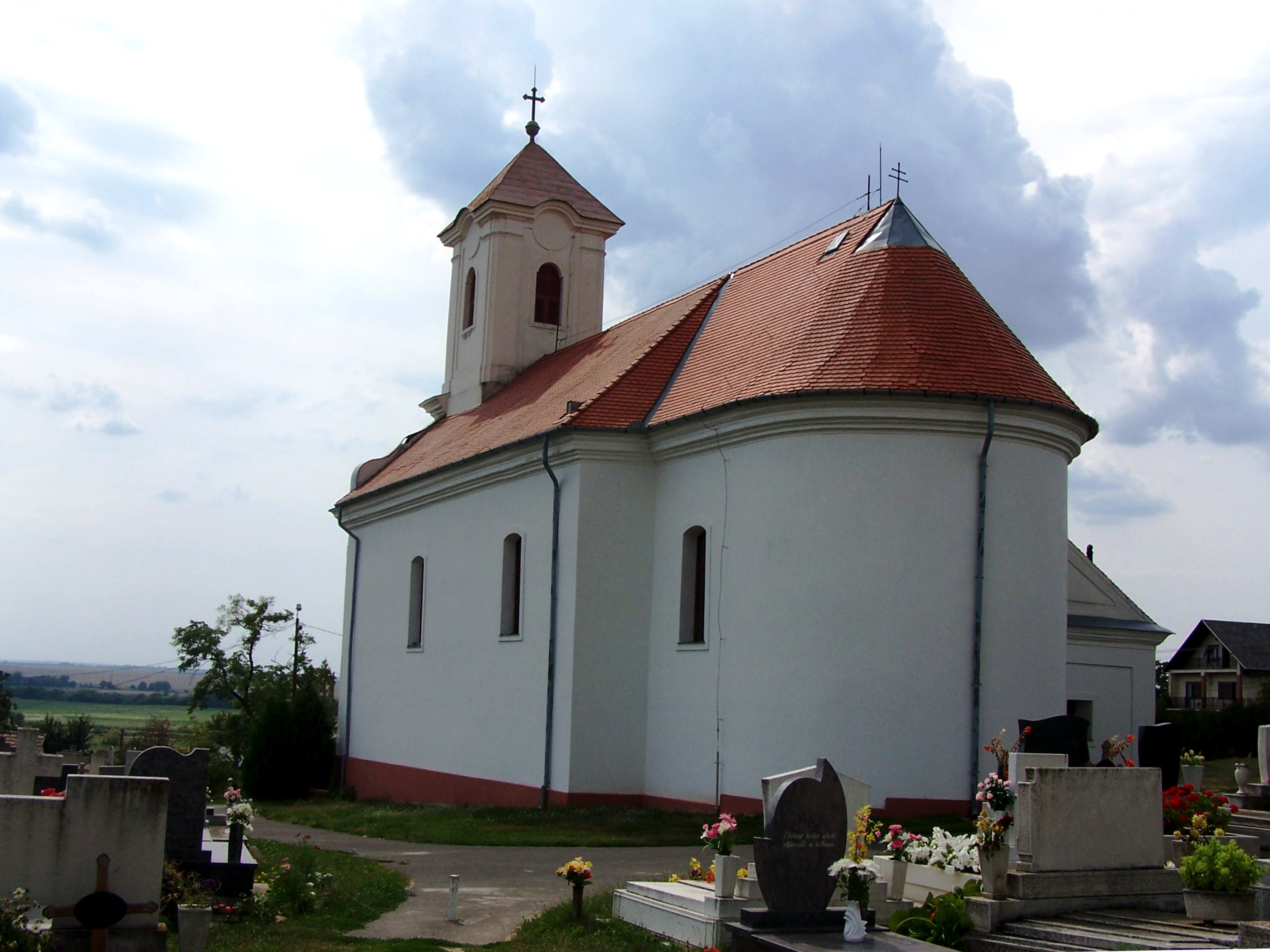
Exaltation of the Holy Cross Church in Szurdokpüspöki

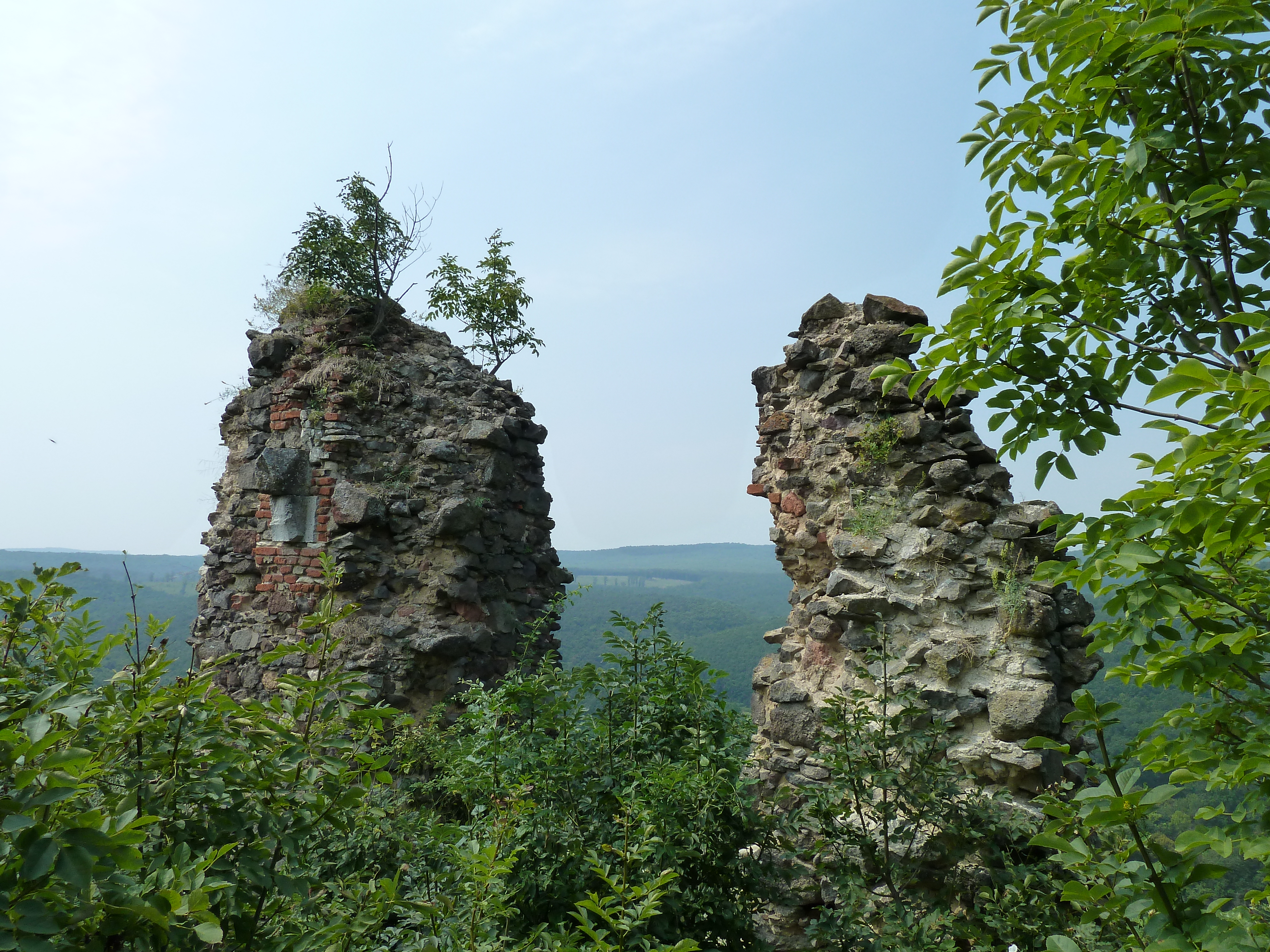
Ruins of Buják Castle

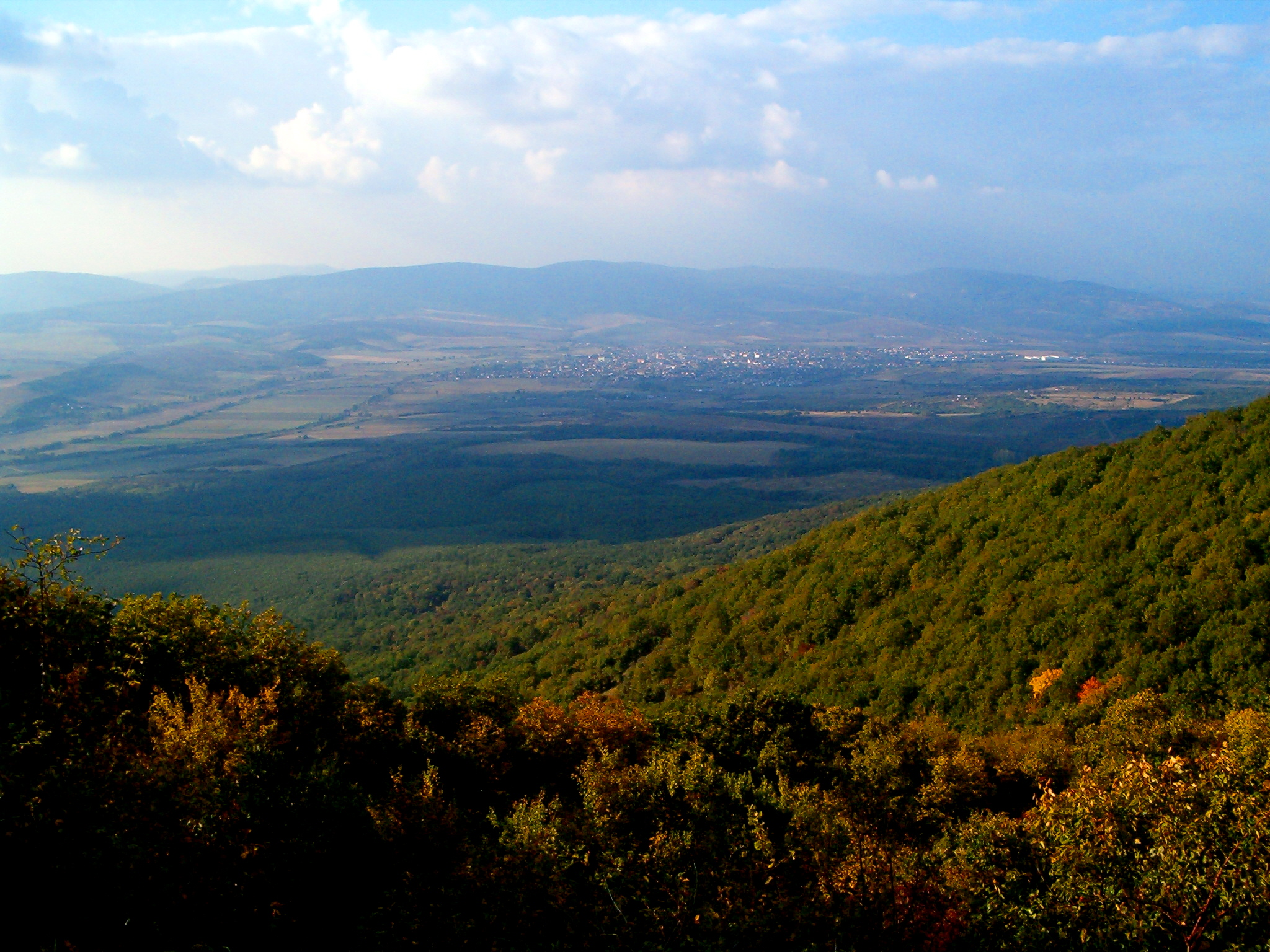
Valley of Zagyva river near Pásztó

== See also ==
- List of cities and towns of Hungary
