= Becsó =

Becsó is a Hungarian surname. Notable people with the surname include:

- Károly Becsó (born 1973), Hungarian lawyer and politician
- Zsolt Becsó (born 1967), Hungarian politician
