= Zoltán Szafkó =

Hungarian politician

Member of the National Assembly
- Incumbent
- Assumed office 9 May 2026
- Preceded by: Zsolt Becsó
- Constituency: Nógrád 1st

Personal details
- Party: TISZA

Zoltán Péter Szafkó is a Hungarian politician who was elected member of the National Assembly in 2026. He previously worked as a passenger transport manager.
