= Buják =

Coordinates: 47°53′N 19°33′E

- Municipality
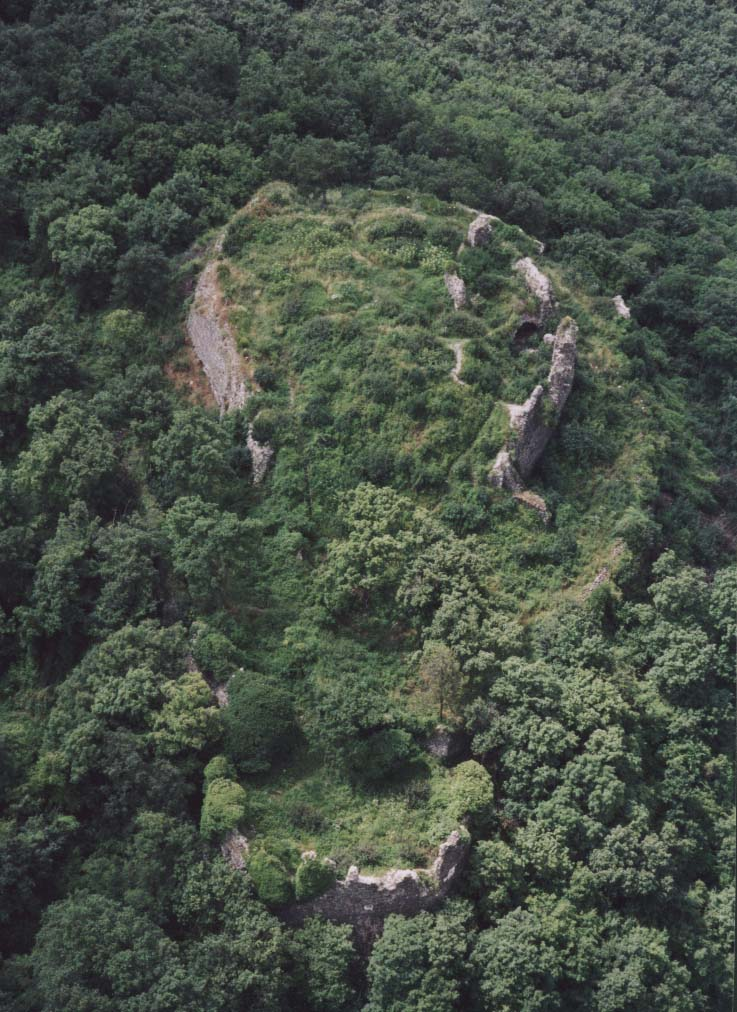
- Ruins of Buják Castle

- Coat of arms
- Interactive map of Buják
- Country: Hungary
- County: Nógrád

Buják is a village and municipality in the Pásztó District of Nógrád County, Hungary.

== History ==
The origin of the name is unclear: the word "Buják" may be Slavic (meaning "bull" in Hungarian), while the expression "Bijan chald" signifies plant lushness, and etymologists trace it back to a Slavic personal name.

The area has been inhabited since the Late Bronze Age—such finds were discovered on the hill along the road leading to Ecseg, at what is known as Tarisznya-part (haversack coast). Artifacts from the time of the Conquest have also been uncovered.

The foundations of the castle were likely laid after the Mongol invasion. The settlement was a market town at the turn of the 15th and 16th centuries.

During the Ottoman campaign in Hungary in 1552, Buják Castle was captured by the Turks.

Between 1562-63, its feudal lord was a certain Szefer, the deputy commander of the Hatvan garrison. At that time, 38 taxable houses were recorded, and this number was the same in 1579. In the 1633-34 accounting books, it was listed among the villages of the Vác nahije, but with only seven taxable houses.

The village probably did not become deserted even until the Turks were expelled, as its population was still larger and purely Hungarian in the early 18th century compared to other settlements.

The nearby Hényelpuszta, which was an independent village in the Middle Ages, has almost depopulated by now. In 1715, 23 Hungarian households were counted, and in 1720, 24 households. In 1745, Queen Maria Theresa donated it to Pál Antal Esterházy, and from then on, it was the property of the Esterházy princes until 1848. Nowadays, Hényelpuszta is an outskirt of Buják, with a population of about 20.

In 1873, cholera ravaged the village.

In the mid-19th century, Bernát Deutsch (1826-1893) became the owner, and in 1884, Count Gyula Károlyi bought the land from him. At the turn of the century, the largest landowner was Countess Siegfried Pappenheim née Countess Erzsébet Károlyi (sister of Mihály Károlyi, daughter of Gyula Károlyi). At this time, the village's outskirts included:

Nádasd-puszta, Szamkó-puszta, Aranykút-major, and Galambos-telep. The countess built a 30-room hunting lodge under the castle, and on the 446-meter-high Fekete-hegy (Sasbérc) peak, she built a four-story, square observation tower. The hunting lodge has been a holiday home since 1947, and the observation tower was neglected and damaged, but it was renovated in 2004 with the participation of international volunteers. The Sasbérc lookout is open to visitors on weekends.

At the beginning of the 20th century, it belonged to the Szirák district of Nógrád county.

In 1910, out of 2287 inhabitants, 2278 were Hungarian. Of these, 2202 were Roman Catholic, 44 Lutheran, and 32 Jewish.

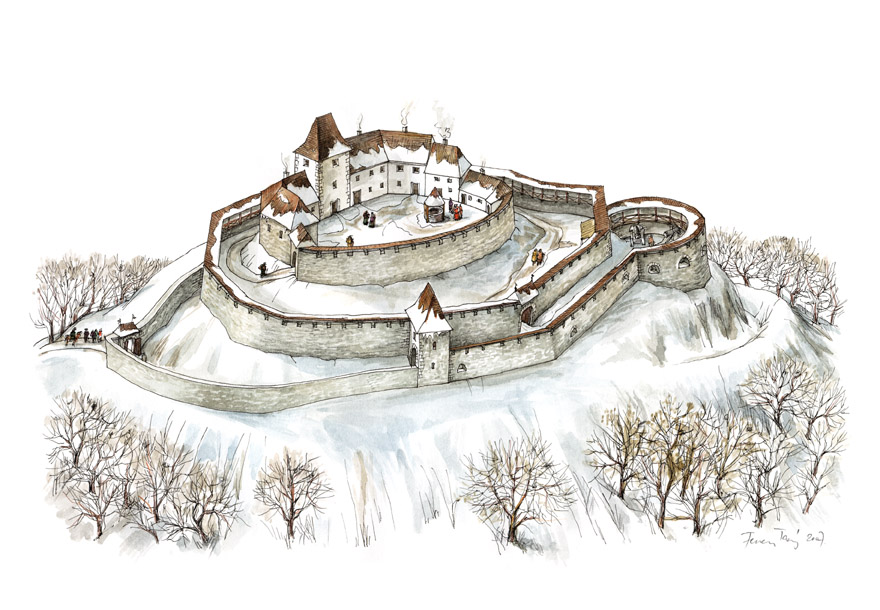
Reconstruction of Buják Castle

Population by year
Year	Population
1870	1903
1880	1646
1890	1875
1900	2147
1910	2282
1920	2255
1930	2368
1941	2487
1949	2600
1960	2818
1970	2762
1980	2689
1990	2540
2001	2485
2011	2291
