= Szarvasgede =

- Village
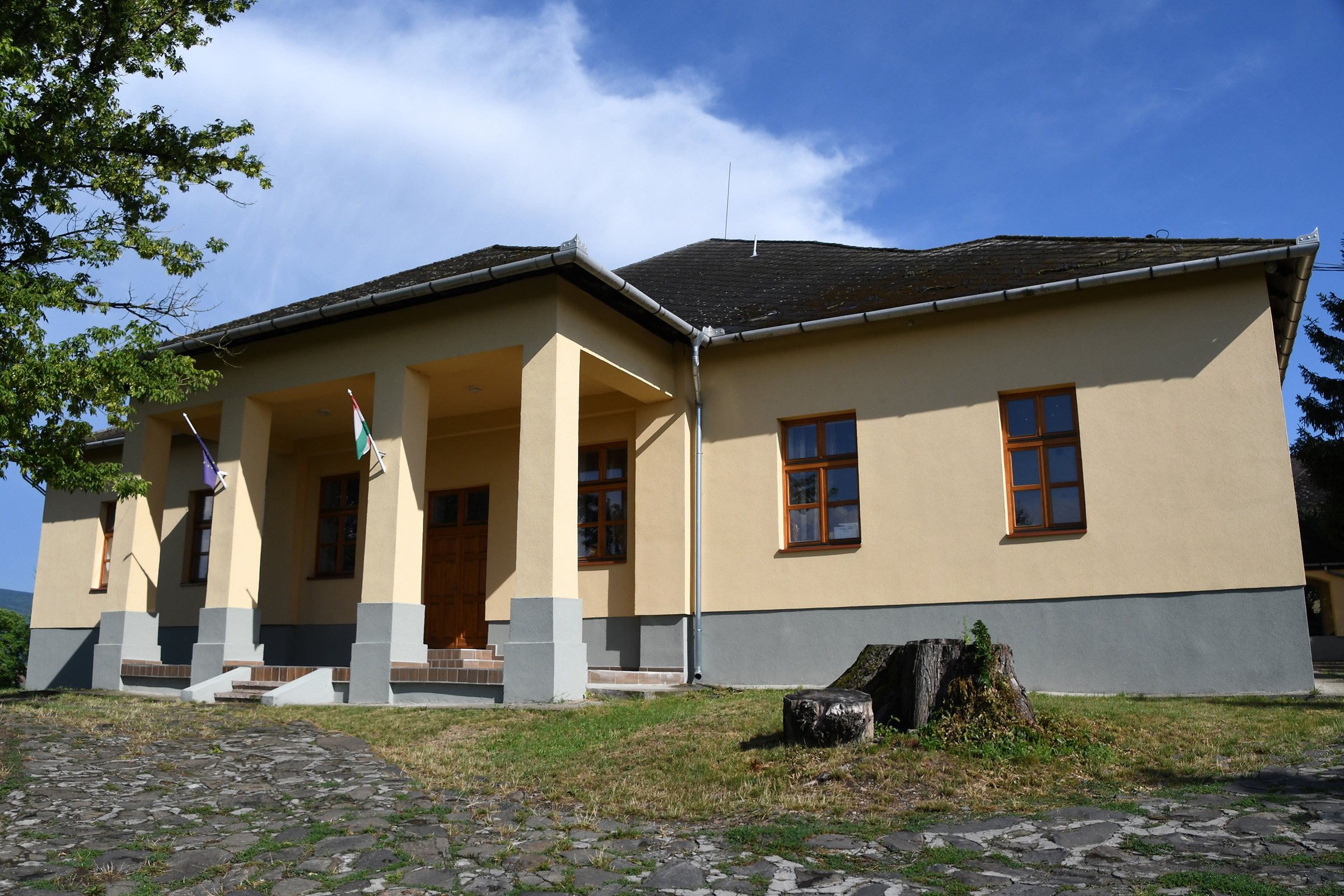
- Village hall

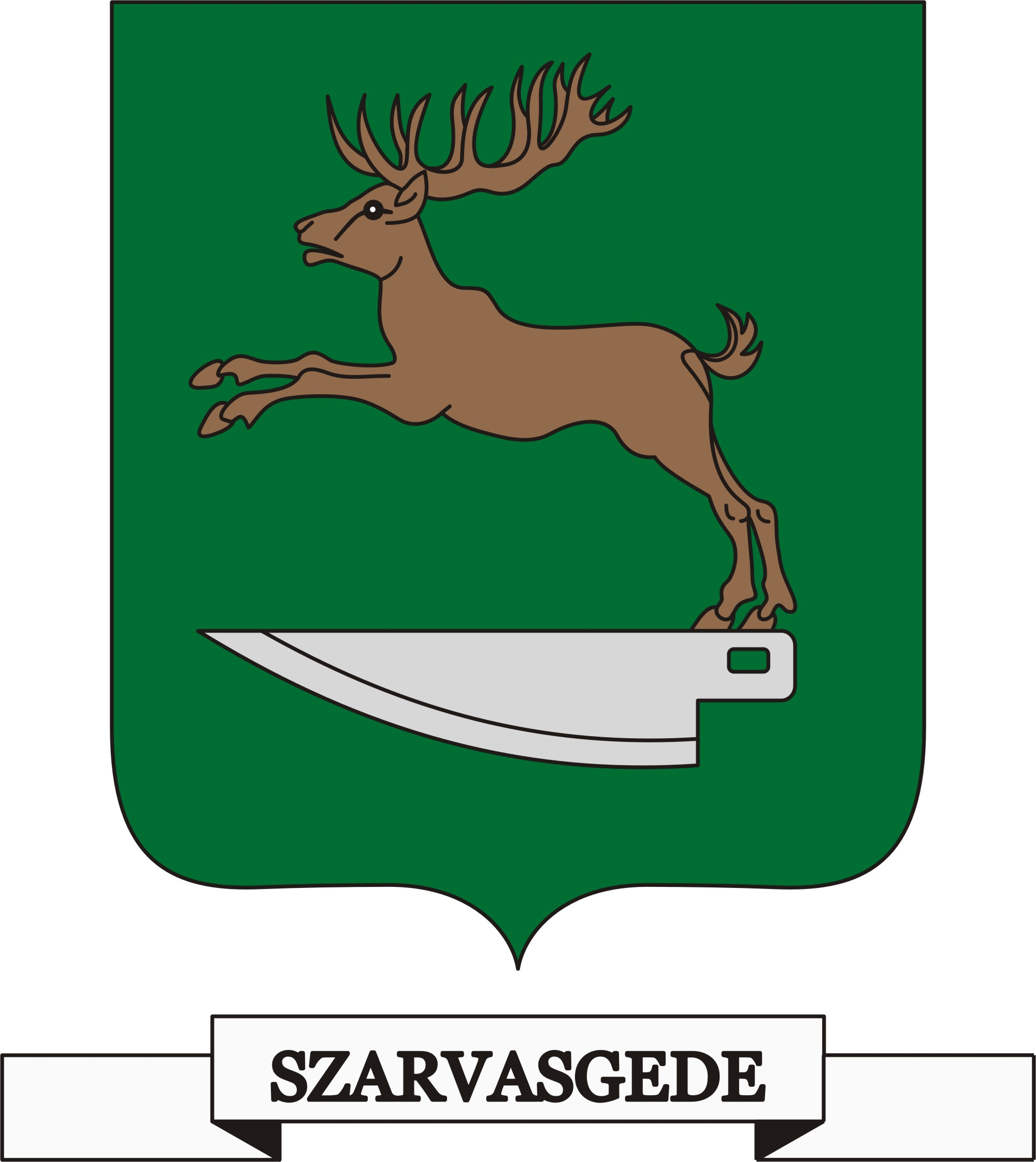
- Flag Coat of arms

- Location in Hungary
- Coordinates: 47°49′17″N 19°38′19″E
- Country: Hungary
- County: Nógrád
- District: Pásztó
- First mentioned: 1344

Government
  - Mayor: Ottó Béla Kovács (Ind.)

Area
  - Total: 9.99 km^{2} (3.86 sq mi)

Population (2022)
  - Total: 400
  - Density: 40/km^{2} (100/sq mi)
- Time zone: UTC+1 (CET)
  - Summer (DST): UTC+2 (CEST)
- Postal code: 3051
- Area code: 32
- Website: www.szarvasgede.hu

Szarvasgede is a village in Nógrád County, Hungary, beside of the Aranyos creek. As of 2022 census, it has a population of 400 (see Demographics). The village located 3.9 km from (Nr. 81) Hatvan–Fiľakovo railway line, 3.5 km from the main road 21 and 16.6 km from the M3 motorway. The closest train stop with public transport in Jobbágyi.

== History ==
The settlement was first mentioned in 1344, when the owner of the settlement, Tamás Csór, had a church built. The population of the village lived from agriculture. The fires of 1861 and 1869 caused serious damage. After 1945, a volunteer fire department, a sports club and a cinema was established. In the 1960s, the majority sought work in the neighboring industrial plants of Jobbágyi and Apc, and most of the houses that exist today were built with the support of the state. Primary school education ceased in 1972, and although it resumed in 1989, it ceased again in 1996. Due to the small size of the settlement, the cinema has also ceased to exist. There is no school or kindergarten. The post office is only open for one hour a day, but the village library is maintained. The landmark of the settlement is the church dedicated to the Candlemass of Virgin Mary, and there are only two churches with that name in the country

== Demographics ==
According the 2022 census, 95.5% of the population were of Hungarian ethnicity, 2.0% were Gypsies and 4.5% were did not wish to answer. The religious distribution was as follows: 54.8% Roman Catholic, 4.0% Calvinist, 1.5% Lutheran, 0.5% Greek Catholic, 9.5% non-denominational, and 28.1% did not wish to answer. No population in farms.

Population by years:

| Year | 1870 | 1880 | 1890 | 1900 | 1910 | 1920 | 1930 | 1941 |
|---|---|---|---|---|---|---|---|---|
| Population | 491 | 424 | 481 | 530 | 590 | 715 | 761 | 681 |
| Year | 1949 | 1960 | 1970 | 1980 | 1990 | 2001 | 2011 | 2022 |
| Population | 690 | 693 | 667 | 629 | 533 | 456 | 409 | 400 |

== Politics ==
Mayors since 1990:

- 1990–1998: Gábor Nagy (TKE, but from 1994 independent)
- 1998–2002: Tamás Kéri (independent)
- 2002–2010: Mrs. János Tóth (independent)
- 2010–: Ottó Béla Kovács (independent)
