= Kutasó =

Village in Nógrád County, Hungary

Coordinates: 47°56′N 19°32′E

- Municipality
- Kutasó
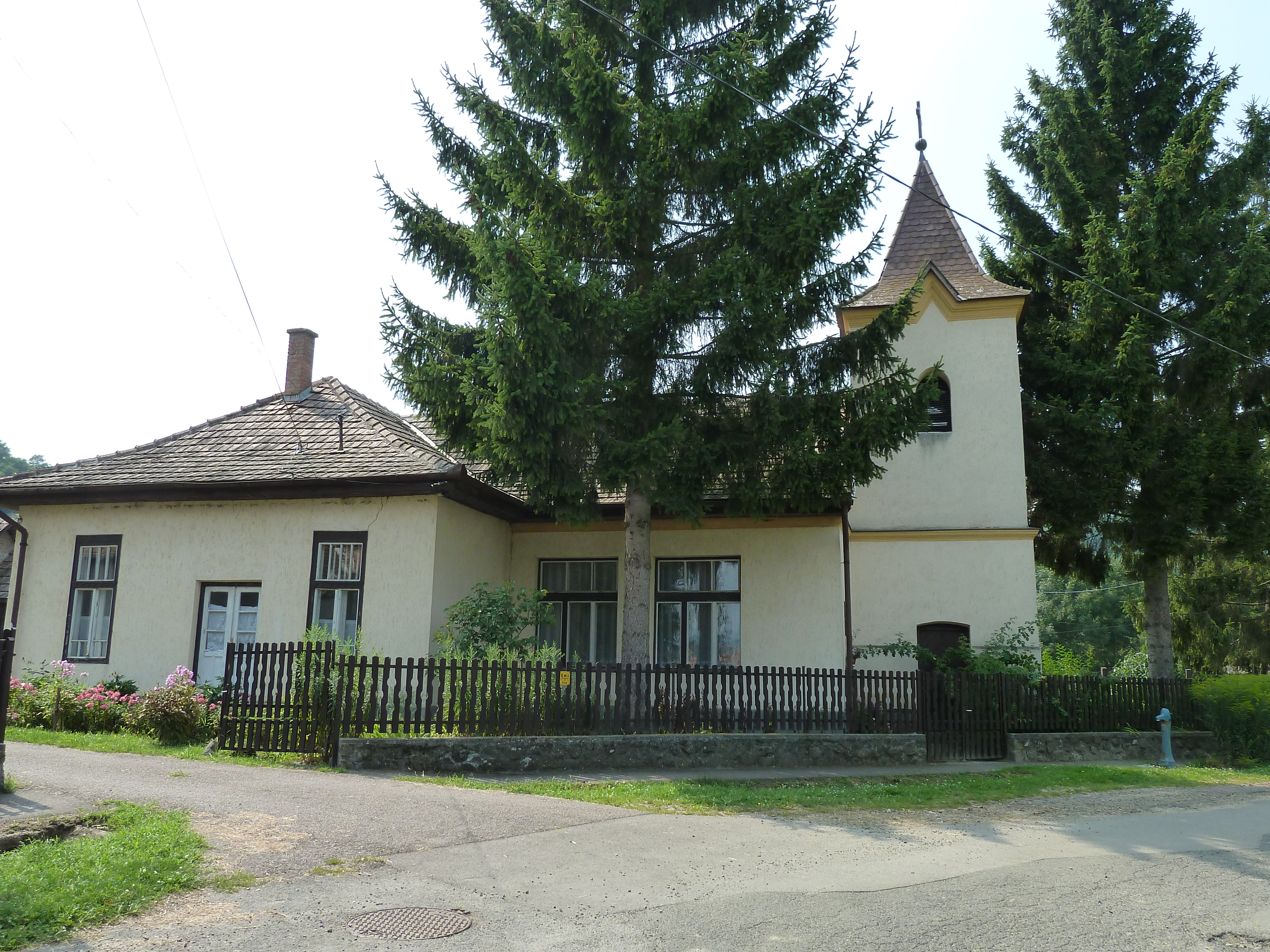

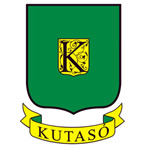
- Coat of arms
- Interactive map of Kutasó
- Country: Hungary
- Region: Northern Hungary
- County: Nógrád
- District: Pásztó District

Area
  - total: 13.72 km^{2} (5.30 sq mi)

Population (2025)
  - total: 86
- Website: www.kutaso.hu

Kutasó is a village in Pásztó District, Nógrád County, Hungary with 86 inhabitants (2025).
