= Alsótold =

Municipality in Hungary

Coordinates: 47°57′N 19°36′E

- Village and Municipality
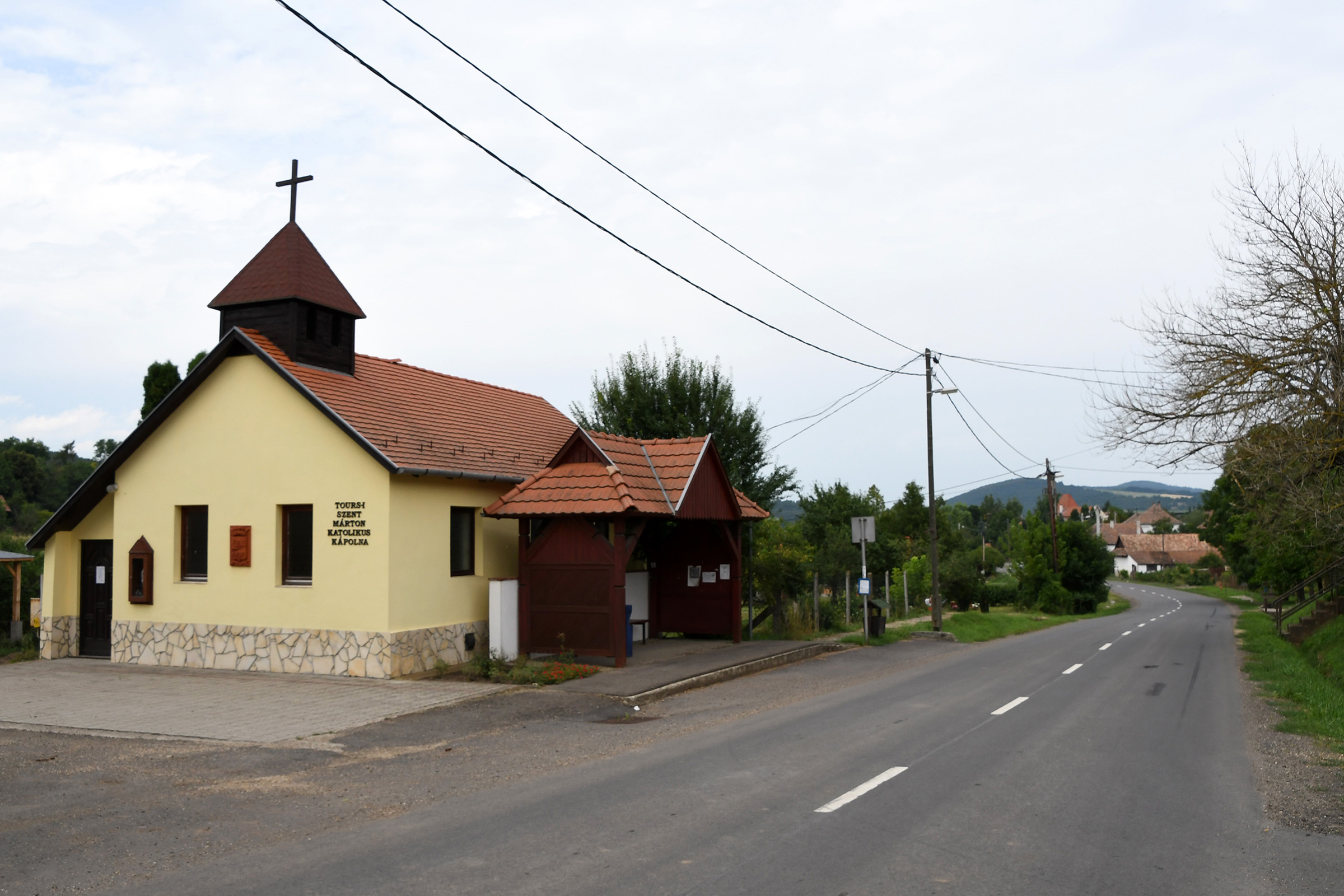
- Street with chapel

- Coat of arms
- Interactive map of Alsótold
- Country: Hungary
- Region: Northern Hungary
- County: Nógrád
- District: Pásztó

Government
  - Mayor: Éva Sándor Szandra (Ind.)

Area
  - Total: 7.86 km^{2} (3.03 sq mi)

Population (2023)
  - Total: 231
  - Density: 29.4/km^{2} (76.1/sq mi)
- Time zone: UTC+1 (Central European Time)
- Postal code: 3069
- Area code: 32

Alsótold is a village and municipality in the comitat of Nógrád, Hungary. The village is the part of the Novohrad-Nógrád Geopark.

Population by year
Year	Population
1870	288
1880	218
1890	236
1900	262
1910	300
1920	403
1930	369
1941	344
1949	363
1960	342
1970	280
1980	242
1990	273
2001	294
2011	237

== Links ==
- Novohrad-Nógrád UNESCO Global Geopark
