= Csécse =

- Village
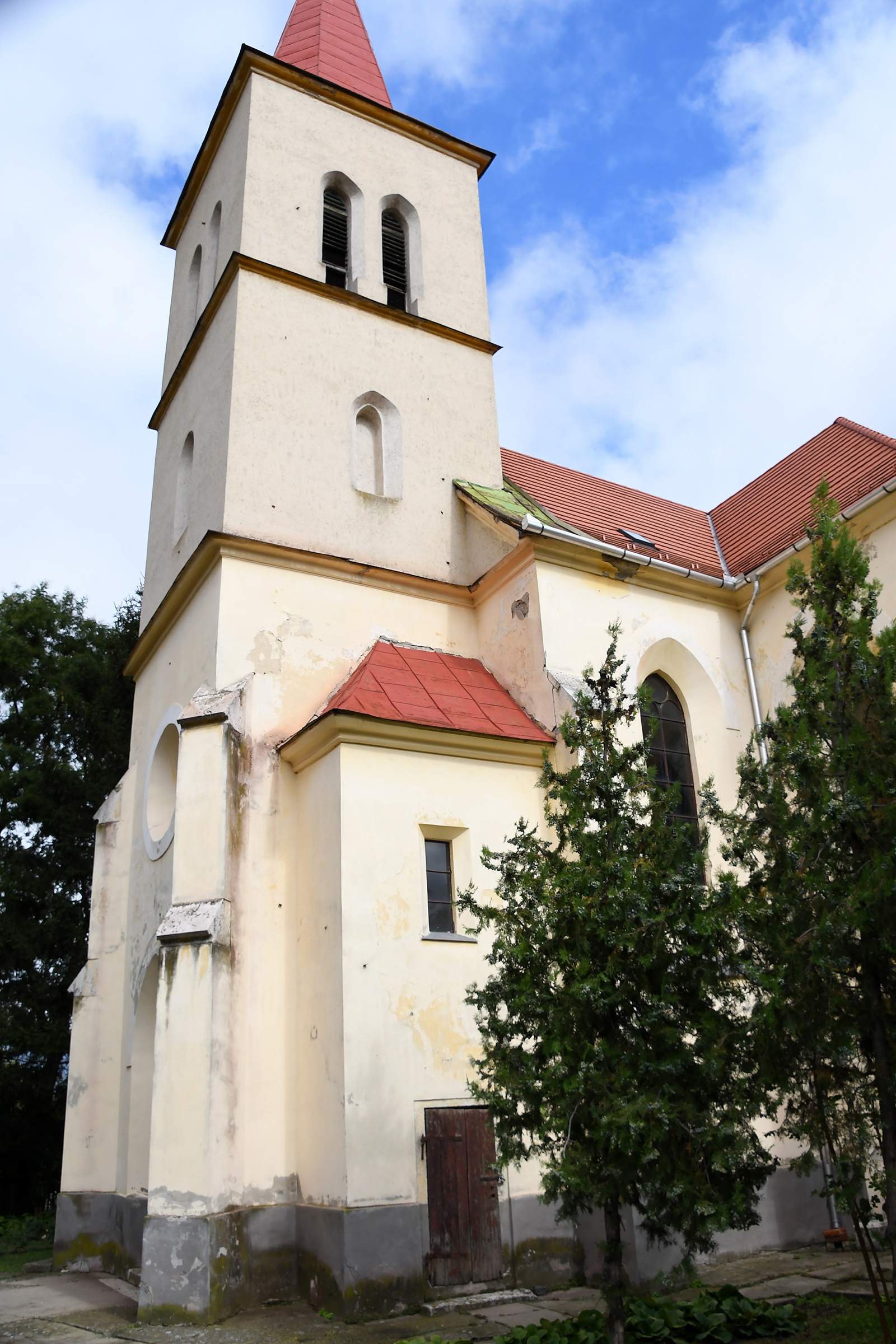

- Coat of arms

- Location of Pásztó Csécse (Hungary)
- Coordinates: 47°52′N 19°38′E
- Country: Hungary
- County: Nógrád
- District: Pásztó

Area
  - Total: 2,173 km^{2} (839 sq mi)

Population (1 January 2010)
  - Total: 896
  - Density: 0.412/km^{2} (1.07/sq mi)
- Postal code: 3052
- Area code: 32

Csécse is a village and municipality in the comitat of Nógrád, Hungary.

== Etymology ==
The name comes from a Slavic *Čeča (a personal name Čéč). There are similar place names in Slavic countries like Slovak Čečejovce, Čáčov, Czech Čečov and others. The historic Slovak name is Čéčka.

Population by year
Year	Population
1870	1005
1880	893
1890	1121
1900	1143
1910	1209
1920	1461
1930	1320
1941	1395
1949	1465
1960	1385
1970	1239
1980	1206
1990	1107
2001	1005
2011	959

== See also ==
- List of cities and towns in Hungary
