= Cserhátszentiván =

Coordinates: 47°56′N 19°35′E

- Village and Municipality
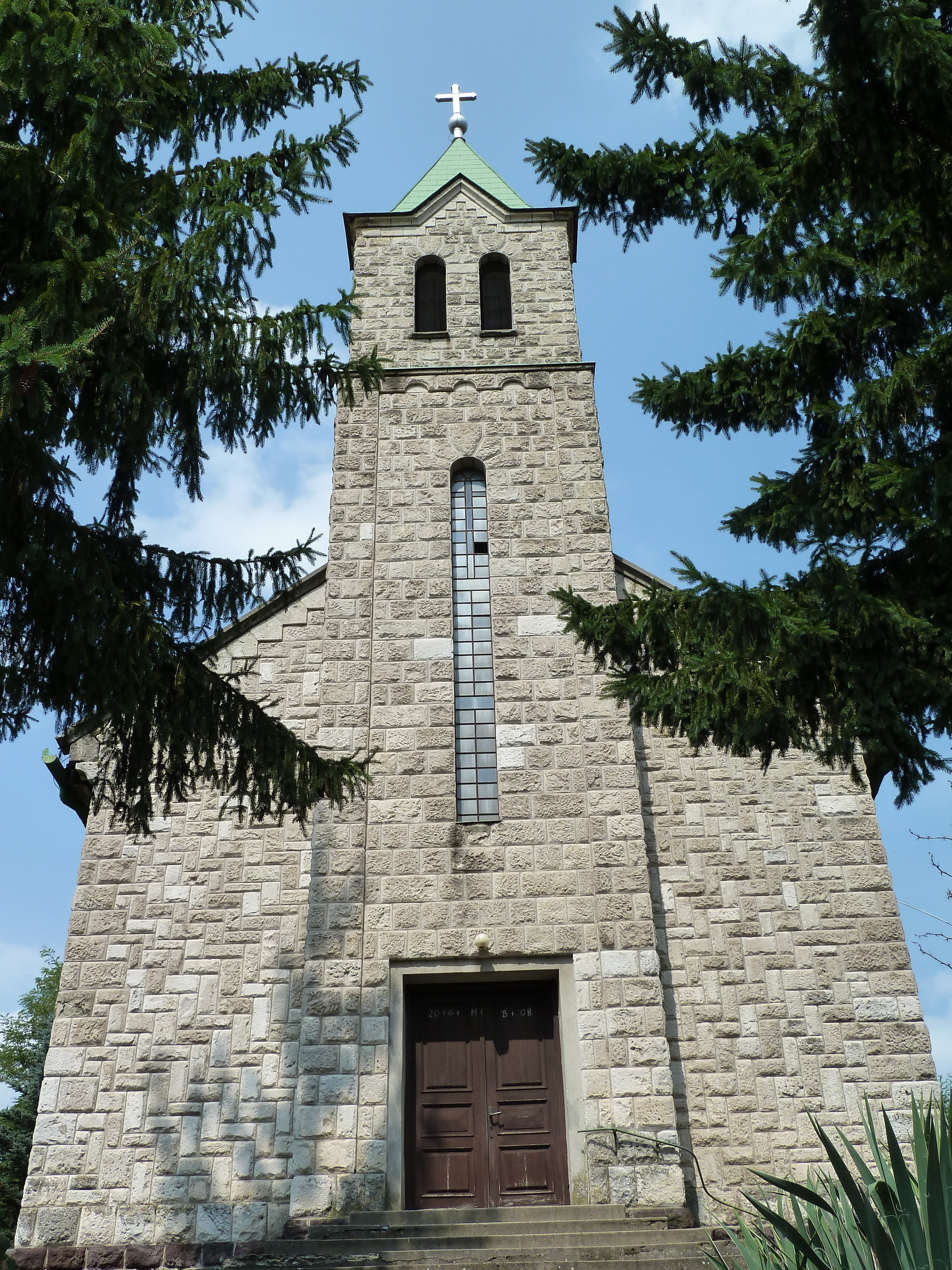
- Cserhátszentiván Church

- Coat of arms
- Interactive map of Cserhátszentiván
- Country: Hungary
- Region: Northern Hungary
- County: Nógrád
- District: Pásztó

Government
  - Mayor: Attila Siraky (Ind.)

Area
  - Total: 10.66 km^{2} (4.12 sq mi)

Population (2023)
  - Total: 108
  - Density: 10.1/km^{2} (26.2/sq mi)
- Time zone: UTC+1 (CET)
- Postal code: 3066
- Area code: 32

Cserhátszentiván is a village and municipality in the comitat of Nógrád, Hungary.

Population by year
Year	Population
1870	694
1880	608
1890	602
1900	554
1910	643
1920	594
1930	610
1941	663
1949	616
1960	533
1970	431
1980	297
1990	224
2001	167
2011	142
