= Héhalom =

- Flag Coat of arms

- Location of Héhalom in Hungary
- Coordinates: 47°46′N 19°35′E
- Country: Hungary
- Region: Northern Hungary
- County: Nógrád
- District: Pásztó
- Rank: Village

Government
  - Mayor: József Bakos

Area
  - Total: 18.67 km^{2} (7.21 sq mi)

Population (1 January 2015)
  - Total: 987
  - Density: 52.9/km^{2} (137/sq mi)
- Time zone: UTC+1 (CET)
  - Summer (DST): UTC+2 (CEST)
- Postal code: 3041
- Area code: +36 32
- Website: www.hehalom.hu

Héhalom is a village in Nógrád County, Hungary with 1,001 inhabitants (2014).

Population by year
Year	Population
1870	845
1880	894
1890	1044
1900	1130
1910	1259
1920	1341
1930	1372
1941	1342
1949	1371
1960	1639
1970	1553
1980	1354
1990	1137
2001	1052
2011	1003
