= Szurdokpüspöki =

- Village
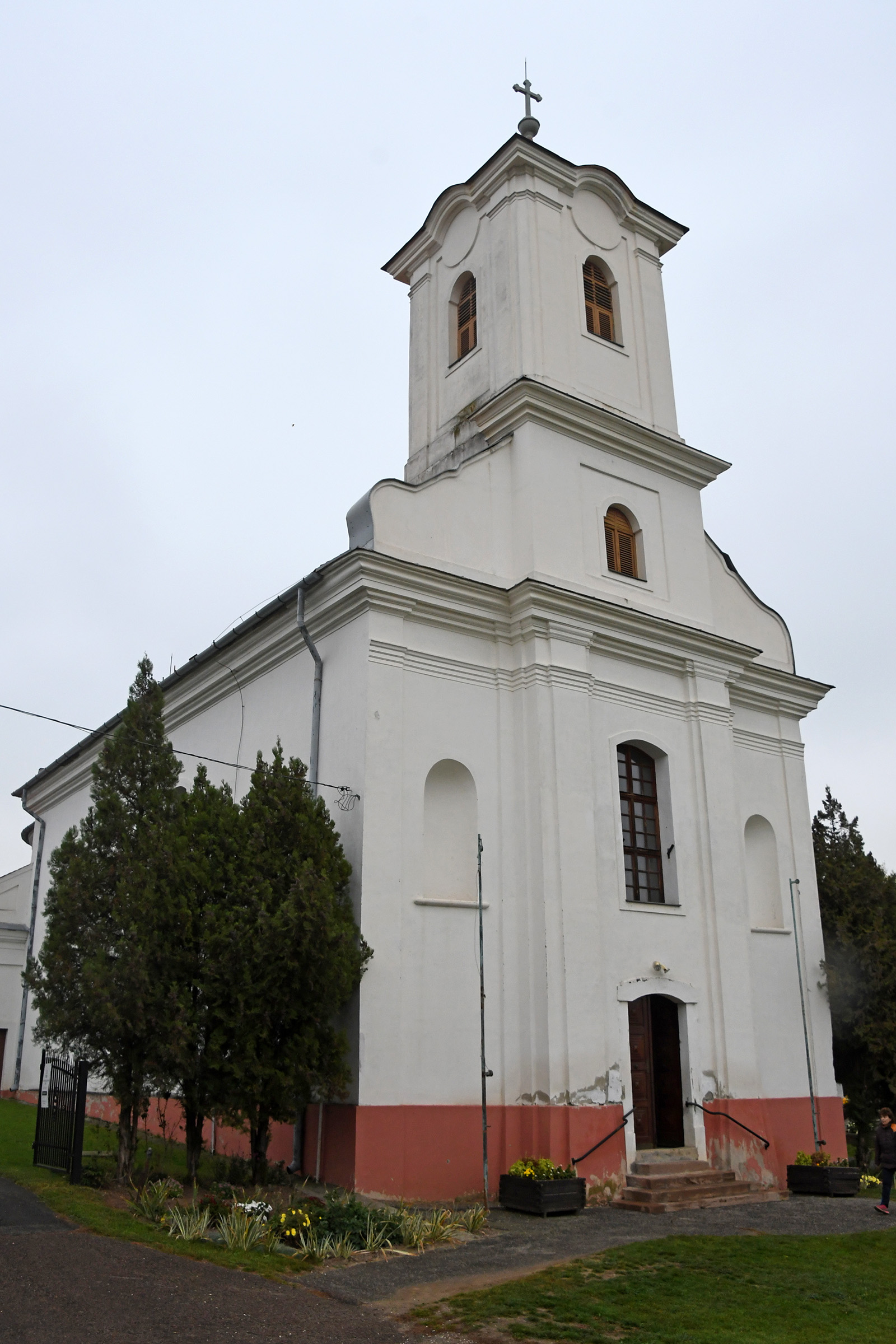
- Exaltation of the Holy Cross Church

- Coat of arms

- Location in Hungary
- Coordinates: 47°51′07″N 19°41′45″E
- Country: Hungary
- County: Nógrád
- District: Pásztó
- First mentioned: 1004

Government
  - Mayor: Miklós Ervin Pintér (Ind.)

Area
  - Total: 26.70 km^{2} (10.31 sq mi)

Population (2022)
  - Total: 1,756
  - Density: 65.77/km^{2} (170.3/sq mi)
- Time zone: UTC+1 (CET)
  - Summer (DST): UTC+2 (CEST)
- Postal code: 3064
- Area code: 32
- Website: www.szpuspoki.hu

Szurdokpüspöki is a village in Nógrád County, Hungary, beside the Zagyva river, under the Mátra mountain range. As of 2022 census, it has a population of 1756 (see Demographics). The village is located beside the (Nr. 81) Hatvan–Fiľakovo railway line and the main road 21 and 21.7 km away from the M3 motorway. The village has its own railway station with public transport.

== History ==
Several Stone Age and Bronze Age finds were also found. The village got its name from the Szurdok, a narrow valley used by the road leading to Gyöngyös. The village is one of the ten settlements that King Stephen I donated in 1004 to the Bishopric of Eger he founded. King Béla IV confirmed the right of ownership in a deed in 1261, but from 1288 it fell into the hands of secular landlords: the Rédeys, Taris, Kompolthys, Báthorys owned it. During the Ottoman era, the population of the village decreased significantly. The church of the Exaltation of the Holy Cross was built in the Baroque style in the 1760s, but the pulpit and the baptismal font made in Copf style. Until the 19th century, the population lived from agriculture. The railway was built in 1867. A quarry with a stone crusher was established in the Szurdok valley, and a diatomaceous earth mine and processing plant further up. A narrow-gauge industrial railway was established to the mines. Zagyvaszentjakab was merged into the settlement in 1925. It was first mentioned in 1296 under the name Szentjakab, and was owned by Péter Kompolti, master of the stewards. The St. James church received a indulgence permit from Pope Boniface IX in 1400. Zagyvaszentjakab is the northern part of today's Szurdokpüspöki. Szurdokpüspöki is the finish place of the Mátrabérc performance hike, which is the oldest performance hike in the Mátra.

== Demographics ==
According the 2022 census, 89.0% of the population were of Hungarian ethnicity, 0.7% were Gypsies and 10.9% were did not wish to answer. The religious distribution was as follows: 46.2% Roman Catholic, 2.2% Calvinist, 0.6% Lutheran, 13.7% non-denominational, and 34.3% did not wish to answer. 1752 people live in the village and 7 person live in a resort place and 2 in farm 2.5 and 1.0 km far from the village.

Population by years:

| Year | 1870 | 1880 | 1890 | 1900 | 1910 | 1920 | 1930 | 1941 |
|---|---|---|---|---|---|---|---|---|
| Population | 1418 | 1295 | 1491 | 1602 | 2059 | 2170 | 2293 | 2290 |
| Year | 1949 | 1960 | 1970 | 1980 | 1990 | 2001 | 2011 | 2022 |
| Population | 2327 | 2513 | 2457 | 2265 | 2221 | 2032 | 1933 | 1756 |

== Politics ==
Mayors since 1990:

- 1990–2010: József Kovács (independent)
- 2010–2014: Mrs. László Miklós Géczi (independent)
- 2014–: Miklós Ervin Pintér (independent)

== Notable people ==
- Kolos Hanák (1851–1923) founder of the Hungarian Tourist Association (1891–1946)
- György Radnai (1881–1917) operasinger
