= Károly Becsó =

Hungarian lawyer and politician

Member of the National Assembly
- In office 8 May 2018 – 1 May 2022

Personal details
- Born: 29 October 1973 (age 52) Pásztó, Hungary
- Party: Fidesz
- Profession: politician

Károly Csaba Becsó (born 29 October 1973) is a Hungarian lawyer and politician. He was a member of National Assembly from 2018 to 2022. He is a member of the Fidesz.

== Career ==
Károly Becsó was born on 29 October 1973. His older brother is fellow Fidesz politician Zsolt Becsó, a Member of Parliament since 1998. He obtained a degree of political science and law at the University of Debrecen in 2001 and 2005, respectively. He was a member of the representative body of his birthplace Pásztó from 2002 to 2018. According to critics, the Becsó brothers (often labelled as the "Becsó clan") had established political clientele network in a decade during the Viktor Orbán governments, within the framework of the Regional and Settlement Development Operational Program (TOP) grants in the area of Salgótarján and Pásztó in Nógrád County.

Due to his undetermined serious illness, Zsolt Becsó was replaced as individual candidate of Fidesz in Salgótarján (Nógrád County 1st constituency) by his brother Károly Becsó for the 2018 parliamentary election. He gained the mandate, defeating István Cseresnyés (Jobbik) and Gábor Dömsödi (LMP). Nevertheless, both of them became members of the new parliament, as Zsolt Becsó was elected via the joint national list of Fidesz-KDNP. Károly Becsó was a member of the Committee on Legal Affairs from May 2018 to May 2022 and of the Immunity Committee from October 2018 to May 2022. Zsolt Becsó recovered from his illness by 2022, therefore he became again the Fidesz's candidate in Salgótarján constituency in the 2022 Hungarian parliamentary election. He won the mandate, replacing Károly Becsó.
