= Garáb =

Municipality in Nógrád County, Hungary

Coordinates: 47°58′N 19°38′E

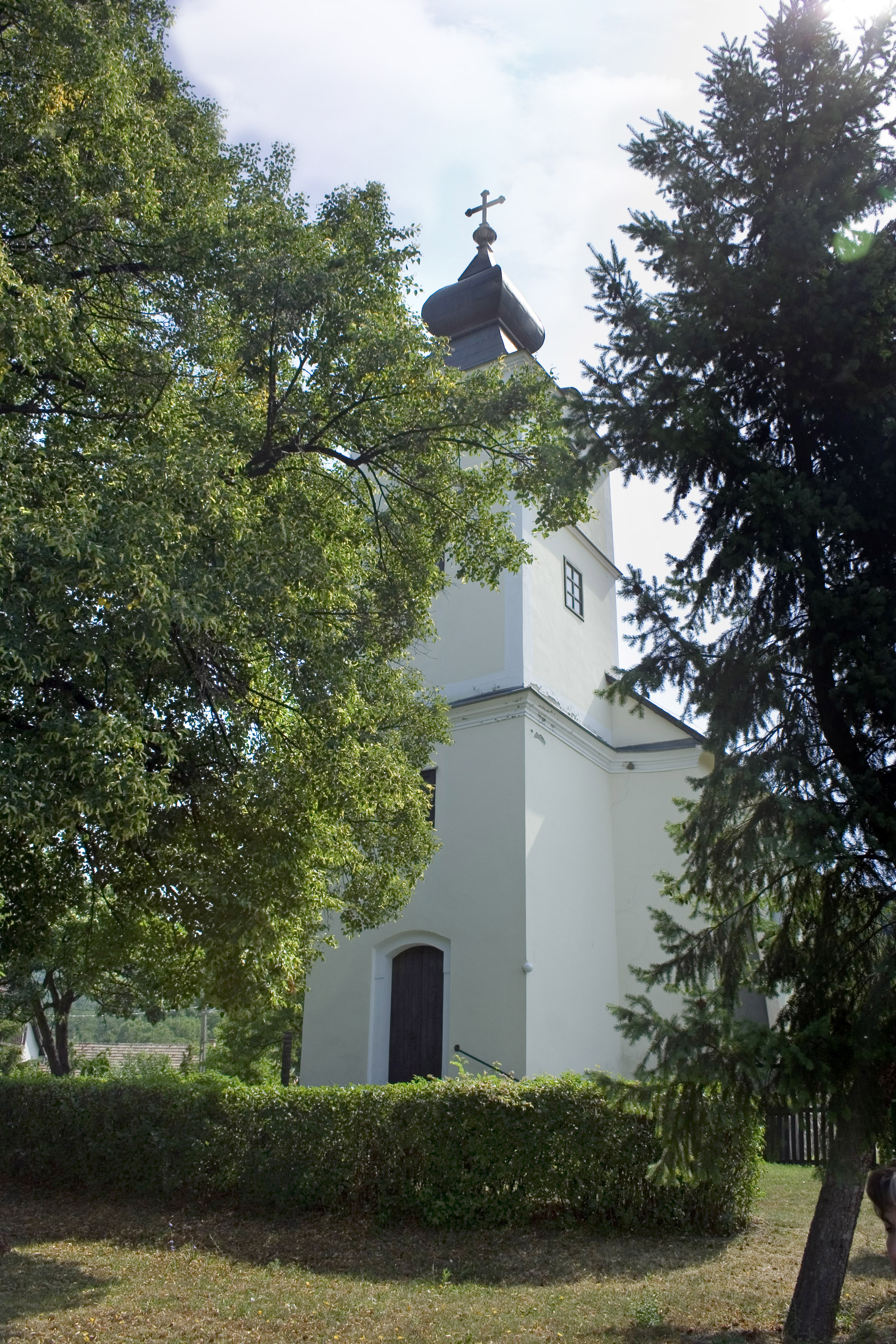
Garáb village in Nógrád County, Hungary - Church

Garáb is a village in Nógrád County, Hungary, with a population of 49 inhabitants (2014). The name is derived from the Slavic languages word grab, meaning hornbeam. There are several Slavic placenames like "Grab" with the same motivation.

== Population ==
Population by year
Year	Population
1870	174
1880	172
1890	166
1900	212
1910	206
1920	245
1930	257
1941	248
1949	221
1960	209
1970	220
1980	152
1990	108
2001	81
2011	55

== Geography ==
The village is situated at an elevation of approximately 375 meters above sea level within the protected natural area of Eastern Cserhát, Its surroundings are characterized by forests, ancient hills of volcanic origin, and springs, making it an ideal area for hiking and nature stays.
