= Bokor, Hungary =

Village in Nógrád, Hungary

Bokor
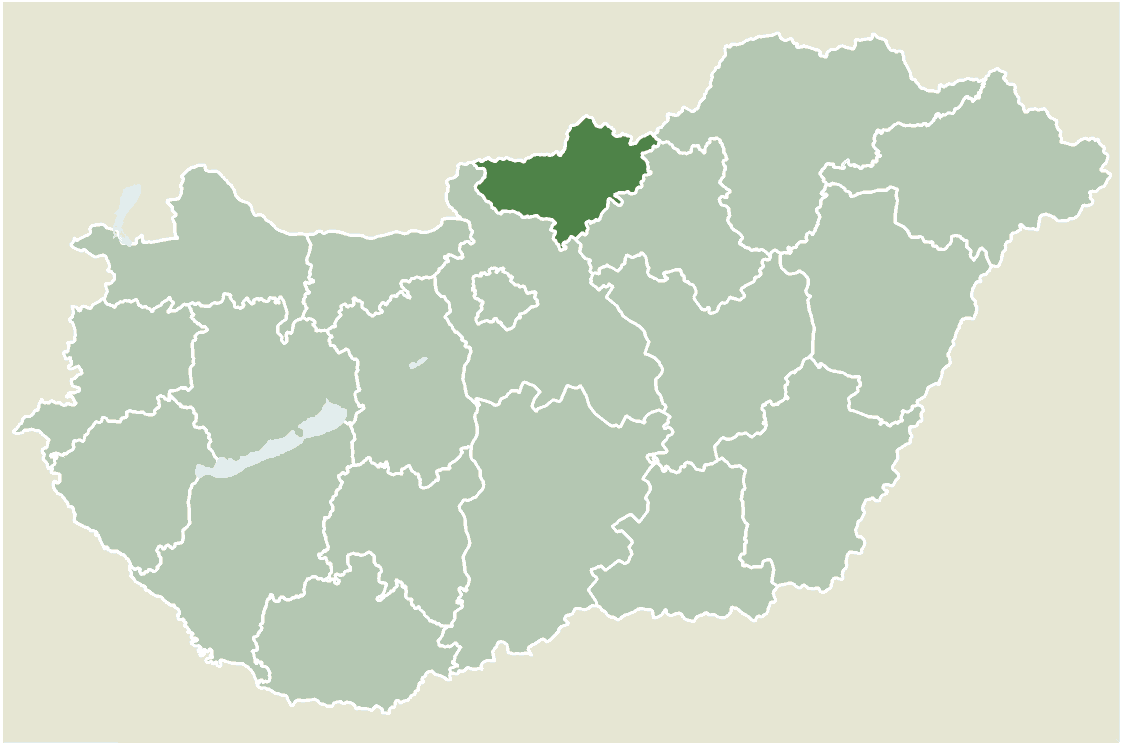
- Location of Nógrád county in Hungary

- Location of Bokor, Hungary
- Coordinates: 47.92943°N 19.54201°E
- Country: Hungary
- County: Nógrád

Area
  - Total: 6.75 km^{2} (2.61 sq mi)

Population (2004)
  - Total: 132
  - Density: 19.55/km^{2} (50.6/sq mi)
- Time zone: UTC+1 (CET)
  - Summer (DST): UTC+2 (CEST)
- Postal code: 3066
- Area code: 32

Bokor is a village in Nógrád county, Hungary.

Population by year
Year	Population
1870	290
1880	260
1890	250
1900	270
1910	286
1920	297
1930	304
1941	310
1949	279
1960	288
1970	281
1980	210
1990	159
2001	143
2011	129
