= Kozárd =

Village in Nógrád County, Hungary

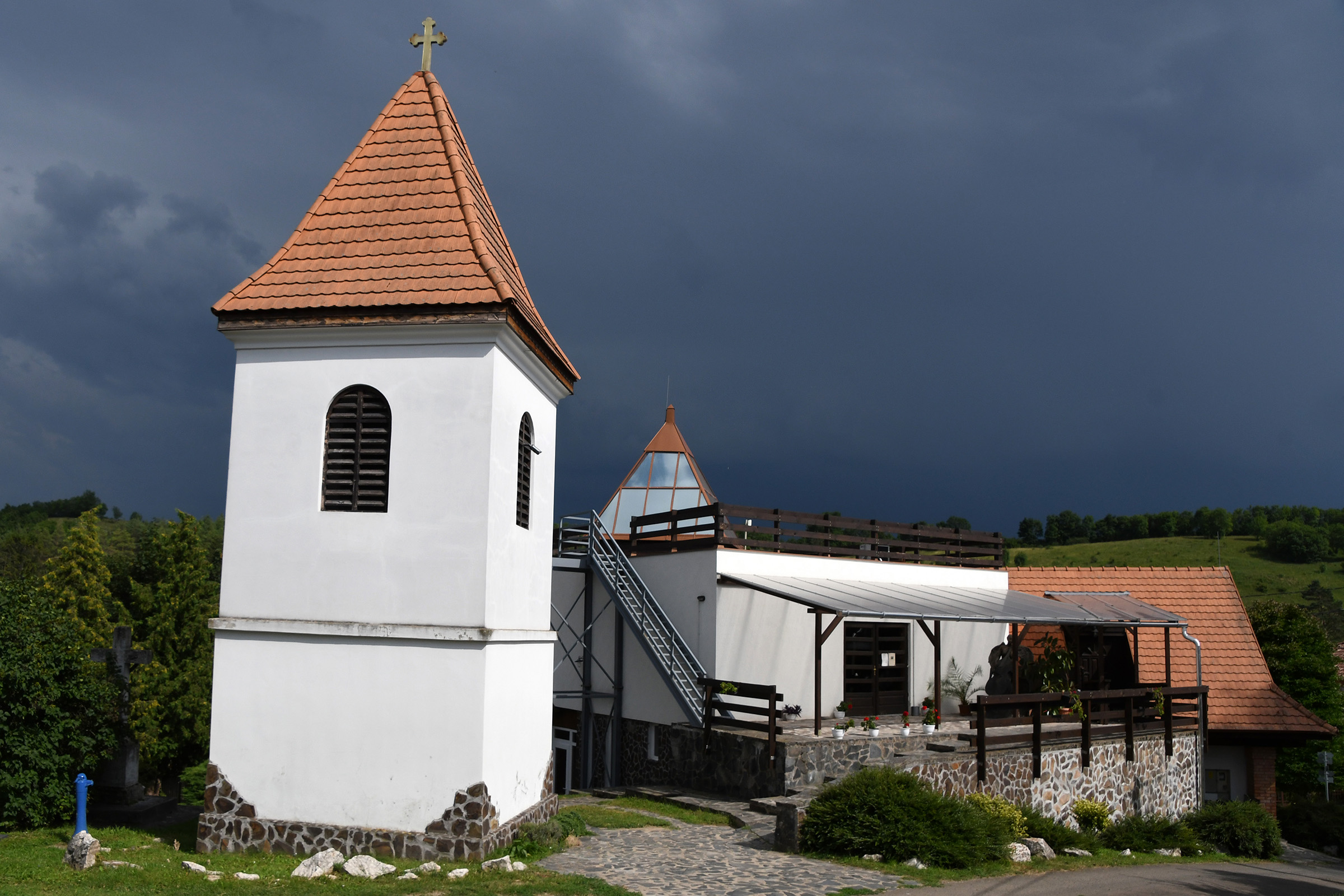
- A Roman Catholic chapel in Kozárd.

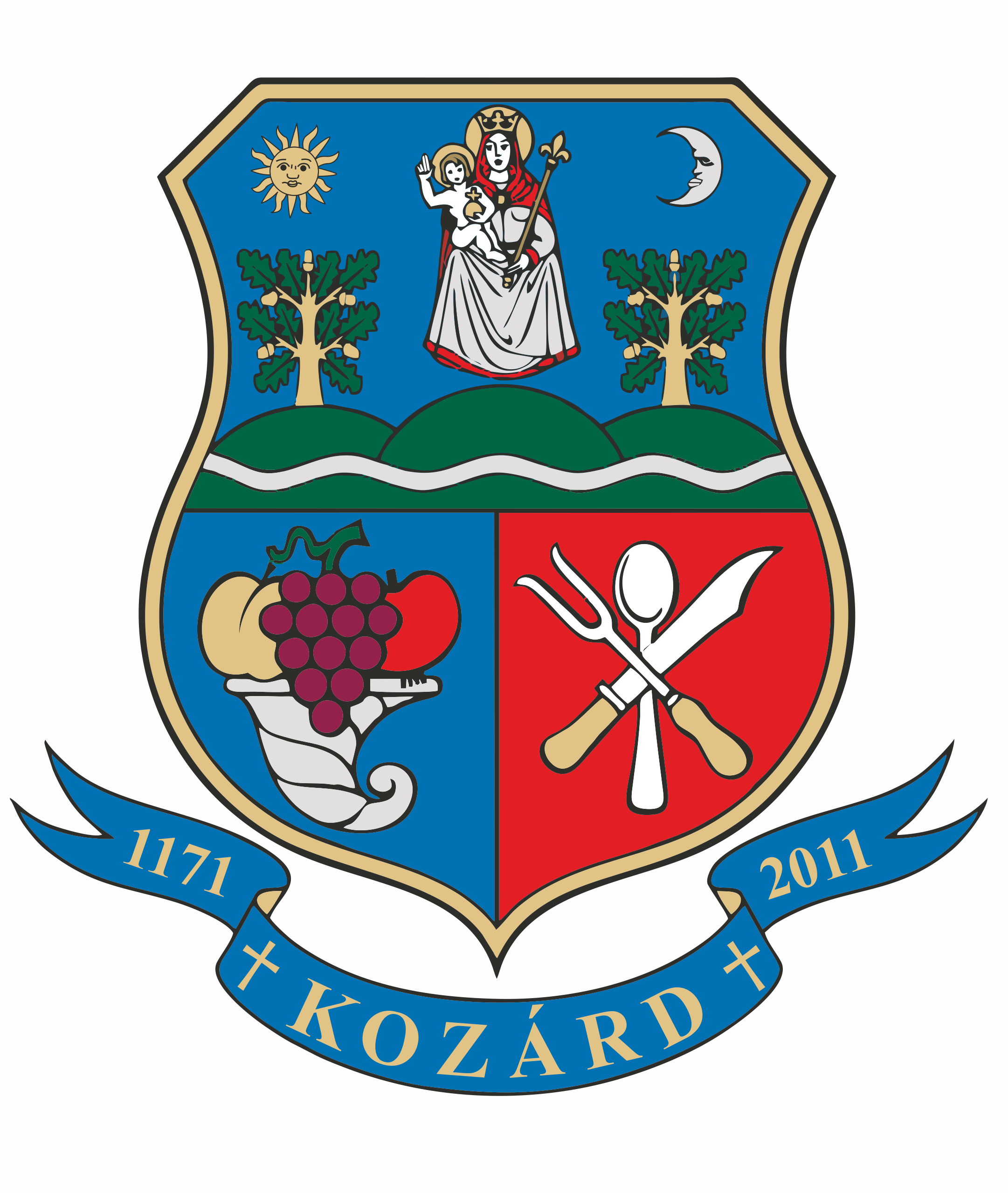
- Coat of arms

- Location of Kozárd.
- Coordinates: 47°54′N 19°37′E
- Country: Hungary
- Region: Northern Hungary
- County: Nógrád

Government
  - Mayor: Hajasné Banos Márta (Fidesz-KDNP)

Area
  - Total: 6.44 km^{2} (2.49 sq mi)

Population (2022)
  - Total: 162
  - Density: 25.2/km^{2} (65.2/sq mi)
- Time zone: UTC+1 (CET)
  - Summer (DST): UTC+2 (CEST)
- Postal code: 3053
- Area code: 32

Kozárd is a village in Nógrád County, Hungary with 162 inhabitants as of 2022.
