= Kisbágyon =

Village in Nógrád County, Hungary

Coordinates: 47°49′N 19°35′E

Kisbágyon is a village in Nógrád County, Hungary with 390 inhabitants (2025).
