= Egyházasdengeleg =

Village in Nógrád County, Hungary

Coordinates: 47°47′N 19°33′E

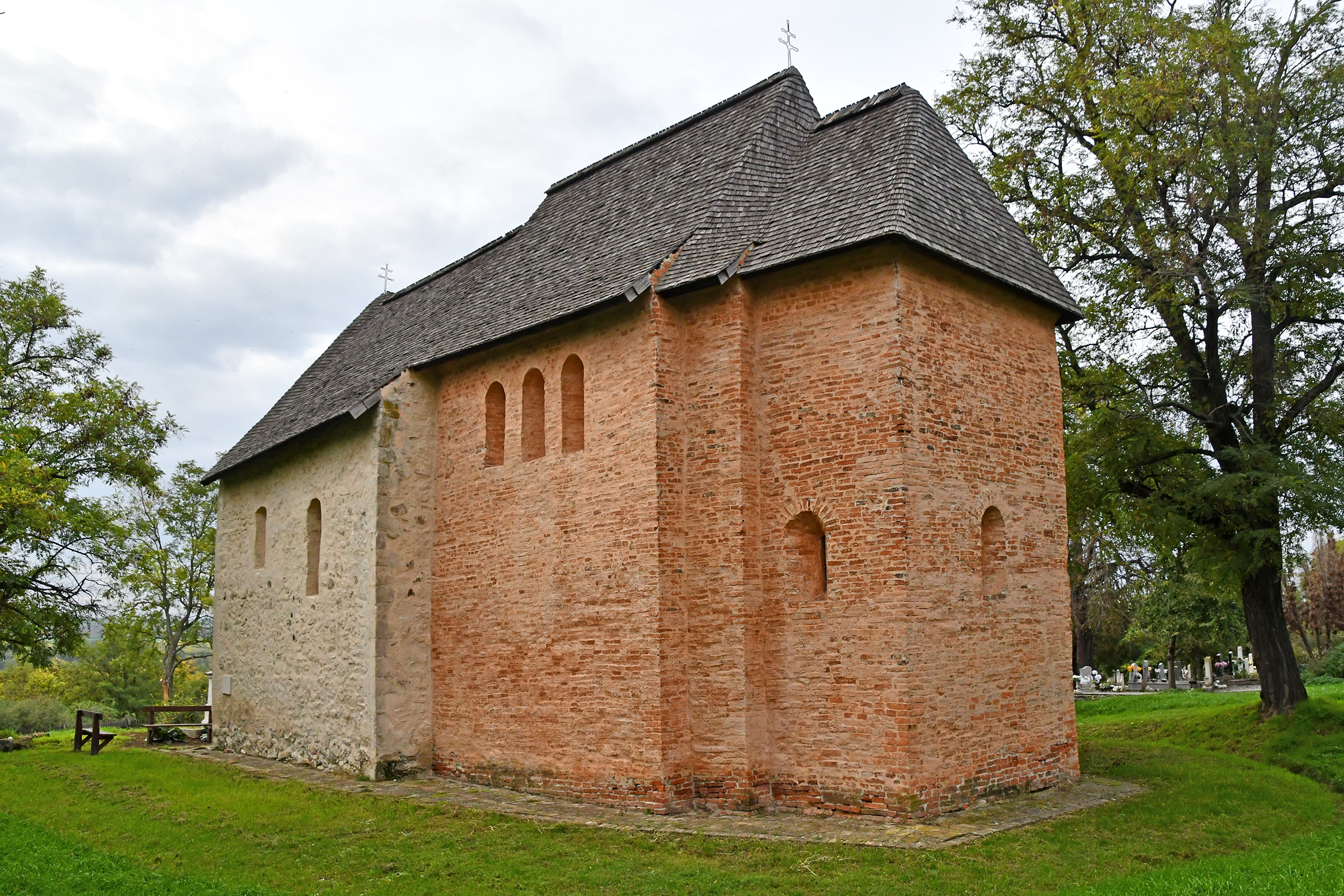
Roman Catholic church in Egyházasdengeleg in 2024

Egyházasdengeleg is a village in Nógrád County, Hungary with 464 inhabitants (2015).

Population by year
| Year | Population |
|---|---|
| 1870 | 641 |
| 1880 | 610 |
| 1890 | 689 |
| 1900 | 689 |
| 1910 | 681 |
| 1920 | 692 |
| 1930 | 842 |
| 1941 | 870 |
| 1949 | 879 |
| 1960 | 839 |
| 1970 | 824 |
| 1980 | 694 |
| 1990 | 619 |
| 2001 | 536 |
| 2011 | 486 |
