= Jobbágyi =

- Village
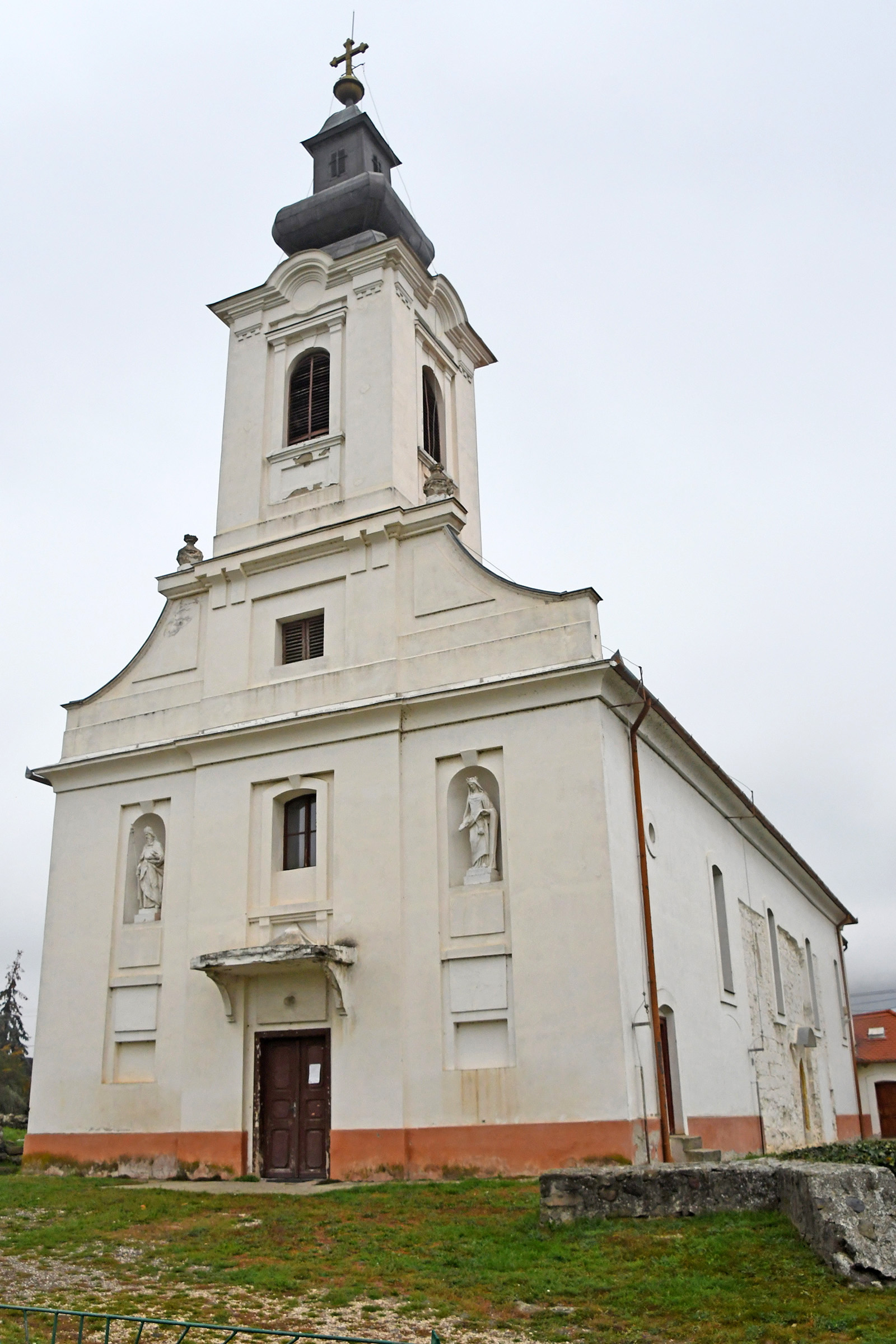
- Saint George Church

- Coat of arms

- Location in Hungary
- Coordinates: 47°49′46″N 19°40′55″E
- Country: Hungary
- County: Nógrád
- District: Pásztó
- First mentioned: 1229

Government
  - Mayor: Norbert Pintér (Ind.)

Area
  - Total: 17.84 km^{2} (6.89 sq mi)

Population (2022)
  - Total: 1,874
  - Density: 105.0/km^{2} (272.1/sq mi)
- Time zone: UTC+1 (CET)
  - Summer (DST): UTC+2 (CEST)
- Postal code: 3063
- Area code: 32
- Website: www.jobbagyi.hu

Jobágyi is a village in Nógrád County, Hungary, beside the Zagyva river, under the Mátra mountain ranges. As of 2022 census, it has a population of 1874 (see Demographics). The village is located beside the main road 21 and the (Nr. 81) Hatvan–Fiľakovo railway line and 17.2 km away from the M3 motorway. The village has its an own railway stop with public transport.

== History ==
They were also found at the sand mine and the quarry in the 19th and 20th centuries prehistoric tools and mammoth bones, which allow us to infer that the area was inhabited in the Stone Age and Bronze Age. The first written mention of the settlement dates from 1229, under the name Jobbágyi, presumably inhabited by castle serfs. King Charles I donated it to Master Demeter in 1326 after the death of the previous owner, the Zaar family. The village received the right to hold a weekly fair in 1329. In the papal tithe list of 1332, its Gothic style church is already mentioned. It was the property of Miklós Szalánczi in 1344, voivode of Transylvania, who gained the right of ius gladii to the settlement from King Louis I. It was the property of Lőrinc Tari in 1424 and then in 1465 Michael Ország. According to the Ottoman tax census of 1546, approx. 150-300 people live there. A watermill was built on the banks of the Zagyva in 1715, in which the produced wheat, barley and oats were processed. Jobbágyi inhabited by 14 families at that time. An epidemic in 1778–79, and a fire in 1797 ravaged the settlement. Between 1796 and 1802, the church was rebuilt and expanded in the Baroque style. In the 19th century, viticulture became the most important. It was destroyed by a fire in 1830, then by a cholera epidemic in the next year. On August 23, 1831, due to the epidemic, there was a rebellion led by Pál Kaszaph, because the fake news spread that the wells had been poisoned. 2 nobles 2 farm officials and the clerk were beaten, the priest had to swear that the nobles had not poisoned the wells. The rebels were later fined. György Sréter built a classicist-style castle in 1821, which later belonged to the Bérczy and Apponyi families. The painter Géza Mészöly lived the settlement after 1882, who painted his picture "Birkanyáj" (The sheep flock) here. In the summer of 1944, the Jewish families of the settlement were deported. The village council in 1951 requested to change the name of the settlement to Kossuthváros, Szabad-Mátra or Szabadságháza, but this was refused by the Ministry of the Interior.

== Demographics ==
According the 2022 census, 91.6% of the population were of Hungarian ethnicity, 15.5% were Gypsies and 8.4% were did not wish to answer. The religious distribution was as follows: 31.5% Roman Catholic, 2.2% Calvinist, 1.2% Lutheran, 23.2% non-denominational, and 35.9% did not wish to answer. The Gypsies have a local nationality government. 1678 people live in the main inner area and 199 in Losonci Road, what is 0.9 km away from the village centre. Another 14 people are living in 3 farms.

Population by years:

Year	1870	1880	1890	1900	1910	1920	1930	1941
Population	1243	985	1251	1375	1569	1729	1577	1547
Year	1949	1960	1970	1980	1990	2001	2011	2022
Population	1597	2211	2357	2457	2298	2338	2219	1874

== Politics ==
Mayors since 1990:

- 1990–1994: László Majoros (independent)
- 1994–1998: György Jancsó (independent)
- 1998–2010: László Majoros (independent)
- 2010–2014: Attila Farkas (Fidesz–KDNP)
- 2014–2024: István Schoblocher (independent)
- 2024-: Norbert Pintér (independent)

== Notable people ==
- András Fáy (1786–1864) author, here written his work "A mátrai vadászat" (The Mátra hunt)
- Imre Frivaldszky (1799–1870) botanist, entomologist
- Károly Bérczy (1821–1867) author, buried here
- Géza Mészöly (1844–1887) painter
- Károly Gubányi (1867–1935) railway engineer
