= Felsőtold =

Village in Nógrád County, Hungary

Coordinates: 47°58′N 19°36′E

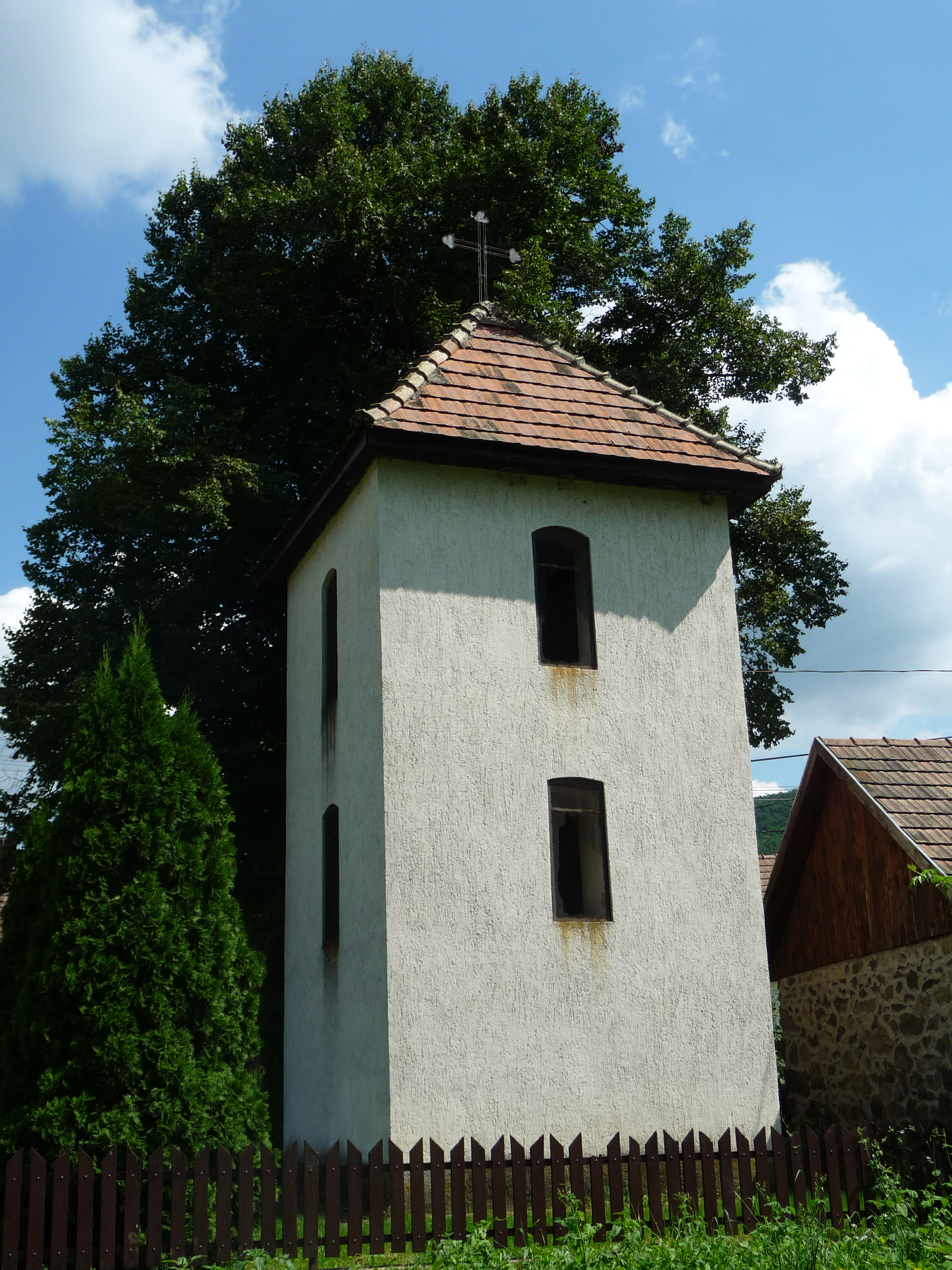
Felsőtoldi harangtorony

Felsőtold is a village in Nógrád County, Hungary with 175 inhabitants (2001).

== History ==
On the border of Alsó (Lower) és Felsőtold (Upper Told), the Mogyorós-Szástó vineyard was discovered about a thousand years of burial sites, and the trace of a Roman settlement was found.

The predecessor of the current villages was a village called Told already existed during the Kings of the Árpád House and was a property of the Toldi family in 1327 and 1470. This village was destroyed in the Turkish times, and has not yet occurred in the censuses of 1715-1720, so it was repopulated only after 1720.

Population by year
Year	Population
1870	294
1880	243
1890	299
1900	324
1910	338
1920	360
1930	348
1941	359
1949	393
1960	409
1970	396
1980	315
1990	267
2001	188
2011	138
