= Ecseg =

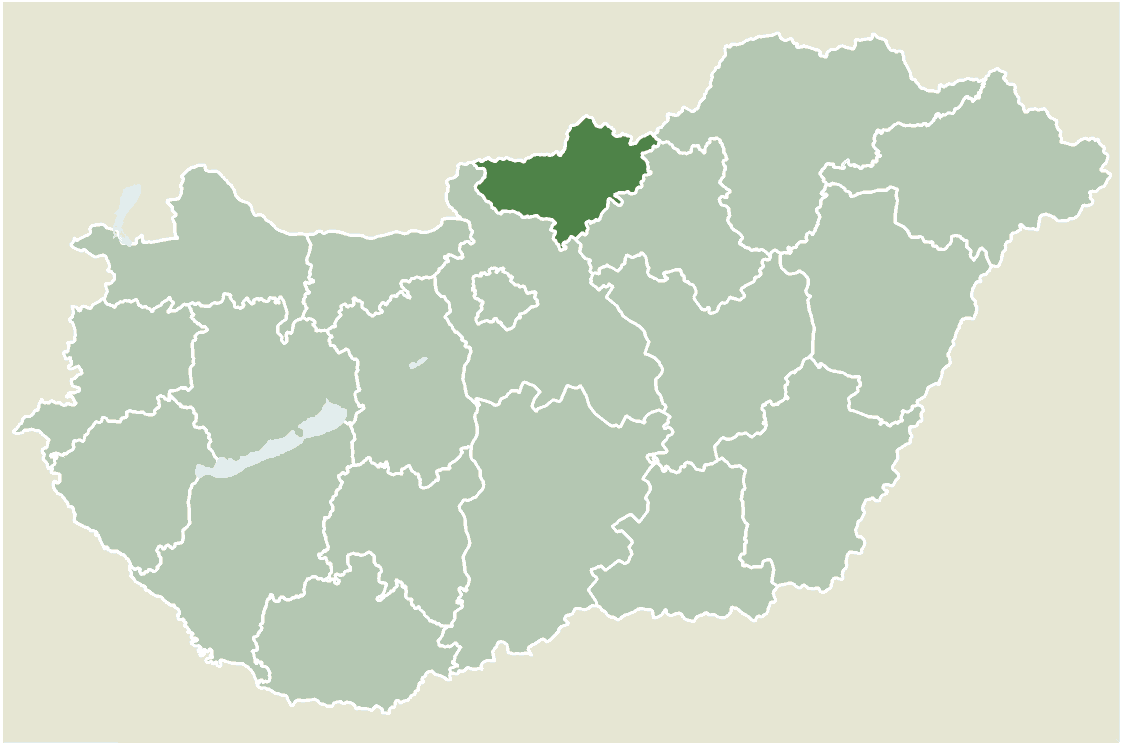
- Location of Nógrád county in Hungary

- Location of Ecseg
- Coordinates: 47.89708°N 19.60412°E
- Country: Hungary
- County: Nógrád

Area
  - Total: 24.1 km^{2} (9.3 sq mi)

Population (2004)
  - Total: 1,273
  - Density: 52.82/km^{2} (136.8/sq mi)
- Time zone: UTC+1 (CET)
  - Summer (DST): UTC+2 (CEST)
- Postal code: 3053
- Area code: 32

Ecseg is a village in Nógrád county, Hungary.

Population by year
Year	Population
1870	1779
1880	1660
1890	1776
1900	1744
1910	1648
1920	1781
1930	1760
1941	1842
1949	1834
1960	1749
1970	1628
1980	1594
1990	1436
2001	1293
2011	1193

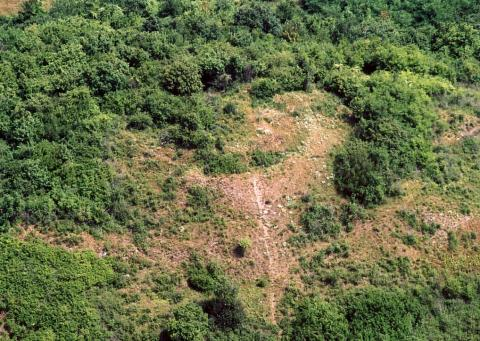
Aerial photography: Ecseg, castle ruins
