= Zsolt Becsó =

Hungarian politician

Member of the National Assembly
- In office 18 June 1998 – 8 May 2026

Personal details
- Born: 14 June 1967 (age 58) Pásztó, Hungary
- Party: Fidesz
- Children: 1
- Profession: politician

Zsolt Becsó (born 14 June 1967) is a Hungarian politician, member of the National Assembly (MP) from Nógrád County Regional List from 1998 to 2010. He represented Pásztó, his birthplace, between 14 May 2010 and 5 May 2014, and Salgótarján between 6 May 2014 and May 2018. Due to an undetermined serious illness, Becsó was replaced as individual candidate in Salgótarján by his brother Károly Becsó for the 2018 parliamentary election. Nevertheless, both of them became members of the new parliament, as Zsolt Becsó was elected via the joint national list of Fidesz-KDNP.

He served as President of the General Assembly of Nógrád County twice: between 1998 and 2002, and from 2006 to 2010. In the Hungarian Parliament, Becsó worked in the Regional Development Committee (1998–2006), Sport and Tourism Committee (2006–2014) and Enterprise Development Committee (since 2014).

== Personal life ==
He is married and has one child.

== Sources ==
- "Az uniós milliárdokból felújított Hollókőn épül a fideszes Becsó család háza" (in Hungarian). Átlátszó. 27 July 2016.
