= Karancsalja =

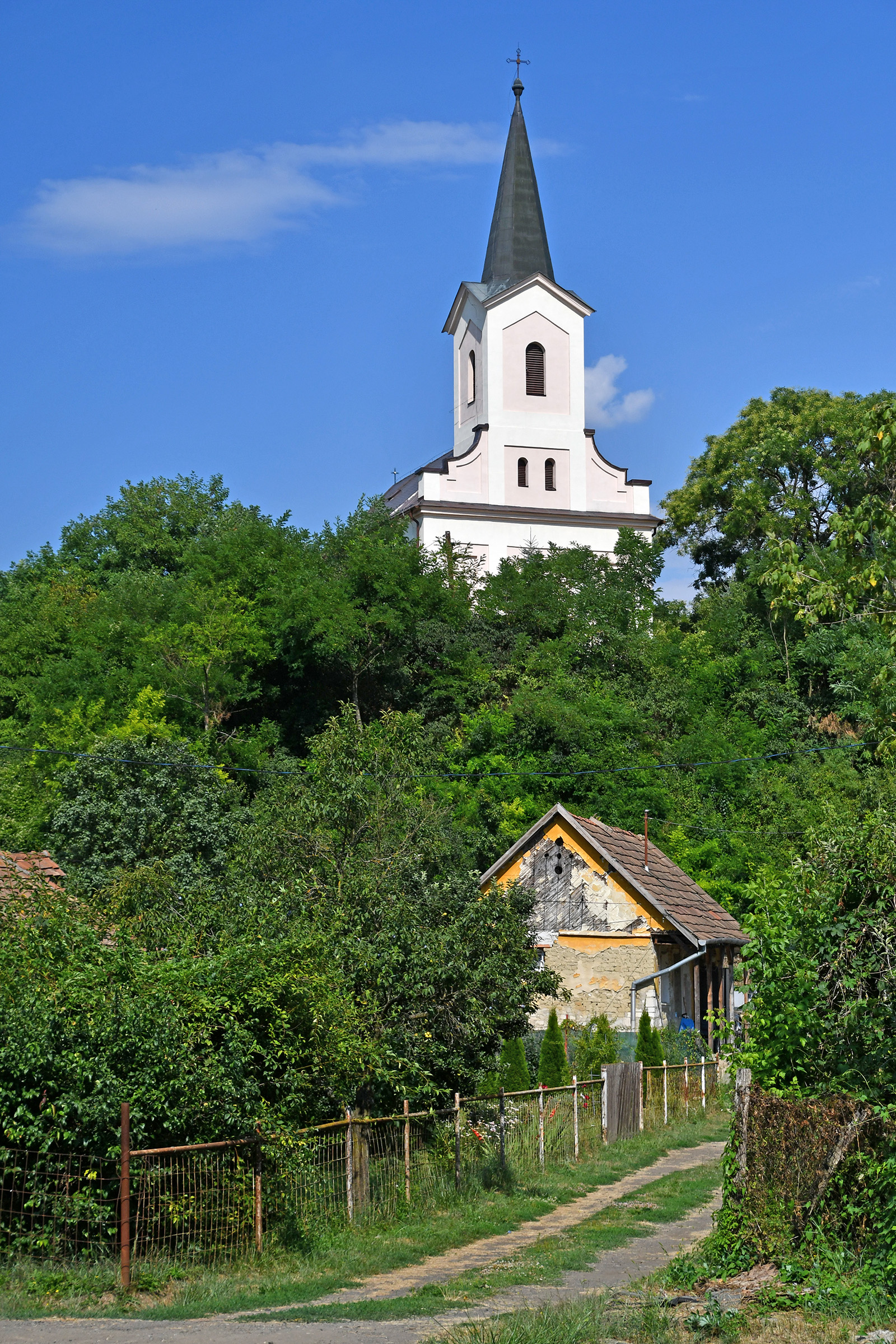
- Church of Saint Nicholas

- Coat of arms

- Location of Karancsalja
- Coordinates: 48.13194°N 19.75614°E
- Country: Hungary
- County: Nógrád

Area
  - Total: 12.54 km^{2} (4.84 sq mi)

Population (2019)
  - Total: 1,454
  - Density: 115.9/km^{2} (300/sq mi)
- Time zone: UTC+1 (CET)
  - Summer (DST): UTC+2 (CEST)
- Postal code: 3181
- Area code: 32
- Website: https://www.karancsalja.hu/

Karancsalja (Hungarian pronunciation: [ˈkɒrɒntʃɒjːɒ]) is a village in Nógrád county, Hungary, in Salgótarján District.

Karancsalja has probably been inhabited since the time of the Hungarian conquest, since its area – the northern side of the valley – is slightly raised from its surroundings, thus providing a suitable place for settlement.

Like other settlements of the Karancs region, at the beginning of its history, Karancsalja was a typical village on a highway, and it was established along the road connecting the Great Plain and the Highlands. Until the middle of the 19th century, this was an important trade route for the county and even for the country. The traffic here was of considerable economic importance.

Despite its favorable geographical conditions, Karancsalja did not become a large settlement, although in the second half of the 19th century, with the emergence and rapid development of mining, the village began to grow. More than 1400 people live in Karancsalja today.

== Etymology ==
The village is first documented in 1335, as Korunchalya. The name Karancs refers to the Karancs Hills, and it derives from a male given name which has Turkic origin. The word alja means 'foot of [a hill]'.

== Geography ==
Karancsalja is located in the northern part of Nógrád county, in the heart of the former Palócföld region. It lies among the northern ranges of the Karancs Hills in its valley. Karancsalja is bordered by Karancsberény in the north, Karancslapujtő in the west, Salgótarján in the east and Etes in the south. It lies near the border between Hungary and Slovakia.

Footpaths and forest tracks are available from the village to the Karancs Hills.

== Climate ==
Karancsalja, typically for its Central European location, has a humid continental climate.

== History ==
Karancsalja is a settlement of the Árpádian age in the valley of the Dobroda stream.

It was named after the 729-meter-high (2,392-foot) Karancs peak, which is situated a few kilometres northeast of the village, on the border of Slovakia and Hungary, is also called "Palóc Olympus".

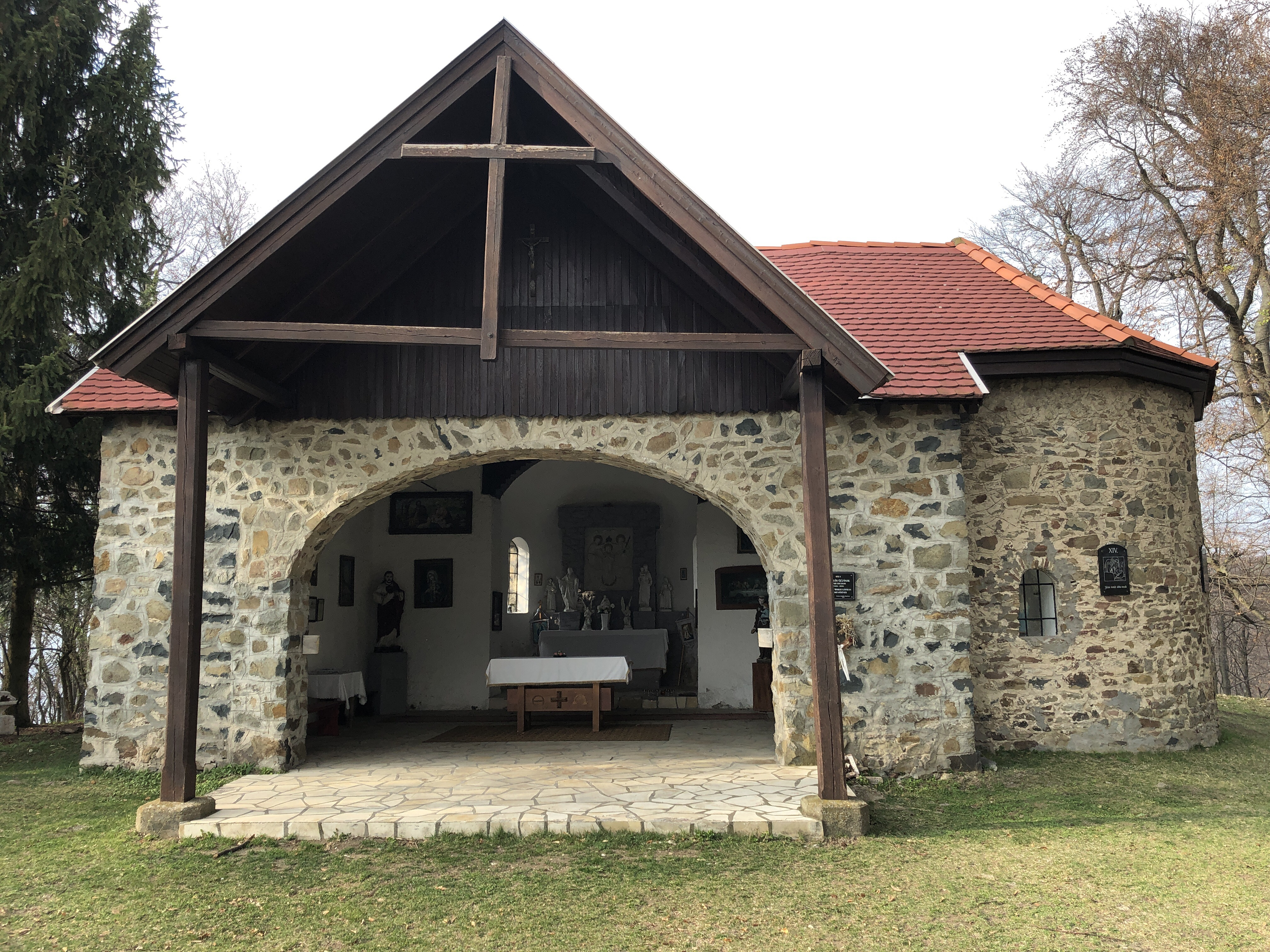
Margaret Chapel

The village already existed in the Árpádian period. According to legend, in 1241 King Béla IV found refuge there one night when he had to flee after bloody battle of Mohi against the Tatars. Tradition holds that the King's daughter, St. Margaret, built the Margaret Chapel on the summit of Karancs to commemorate this famous event.

The history of the village during the Turkish occupation and in the late medieval period is rather unexamined.

In 1548 it was owned by Ferenc Bebek.

In 1715, the census recorded 8, and in 1720, 14 Hungarian households.

In 1770 László Jankovich, at the beginning of the 19th century Antal Jankovics, and in the early 1900s Géza Balla were the most important landowners of the village.

The mansion in the village was built by Miklós Jankovich at the beginning of the 19th century, but was rebuilt by its new owner in 1909 and demolished in the 1950s.

In 1873 a large cholera epidemic devastated the settlement.

The coal mines on the outskirts of Karancsalja were of great importance to the life of the population, providing a livelihood for many people in the 19th and 20th centuries. At the end of 1944, the Karancslejtős mine at Etes, a few kilometres from the village, was the scene of a tragic event when seven of the miners who refused to work, to get better conditions, were shot dead.

== Population ==
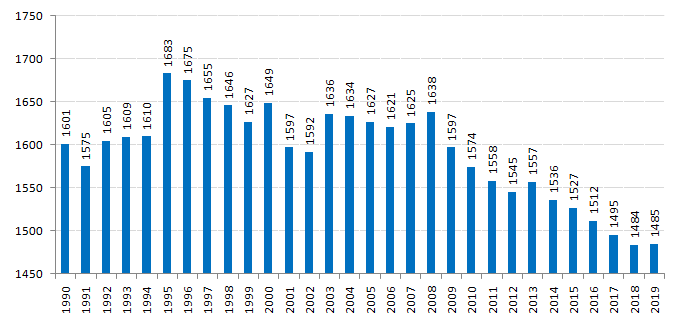
Resident population of Karancsalja (1990–2019)

=== Ethnic groups ===
In 2001, 99% of the population of the settlement declared themselves to be Hungarian and 1% Romani.

At the 2011 census, 88.5% of the population said they were Hungarian, 2.9% Romani, 0.3% German, 0.3% Slovak (11.5% did not answer; due to dual identities, the total may be more than 100%).

=== Religion ===
The distribution of religion was as follows: Roman Catholic 47.4%, Reformed 1.9%, Lutheran 0.8%, non-denominational 22.3% (25.6% did not answer).

The Roman Catholic church in Karancsalja was built in 1886.

== Politics ==
=== List of mayors ===
- 1990–1994: Ponyi Ferenc (independent)
- 1994–1998: Ponyi Ferenc (independent)
- 1998–2002: Lantos Sándor (independent)
- 2002–2006: Lantos Sándor (MSZP)
- 2006–2010: Lantos Sándor (MSZP)
- 2010–2013: Pál Gyula (independent)
- 2013–2014: Sulyok Oszkár Jánosné (independent)
- 2014–2019: Sulyok Oszkár Jánosné (independent)
- from 2019: Sulyok Oszkár Jánosné (independent)

== Education ==
There is a kindergarten (Karancsaljai Napfény Óvoda) and a primary school (Mocsáry Antal Általános Iskola Karancsaljai Tagintézménye) in the village. There are no secondary and vocational schools in the village.

== Transport ==
The village is located in the northeastern part of Nógrád county, only five Kilometres northwest of the county capital Salgótarján. From Salgótarján, the easiest way to reach Karancsalja is by Road 2206 (a side road of the Dual carriageway 21 between Litke and Salgótarján), it is the first settlement from the county capital.

The village used to be isolated from Budapest, Hungary's main transport hub. However, the completion of the Dual carriageway 21 means Budapest can now be reached in under 1.5 hours. Karancsalja is also accessible from the Main road 22, from where one has to turn east-northeast in Ságújfalu, to the 7-kilometre-long (4.3 mi) Side road 22109 through Etes.

Although Karancsalja is not served by train, the nearest train station in Salgótarján is available by regional buses (cca 10 minutes journey time), from where Budapest is available by coach (direct service) or by train (with 1 change in Hatvan).

== The village today ==
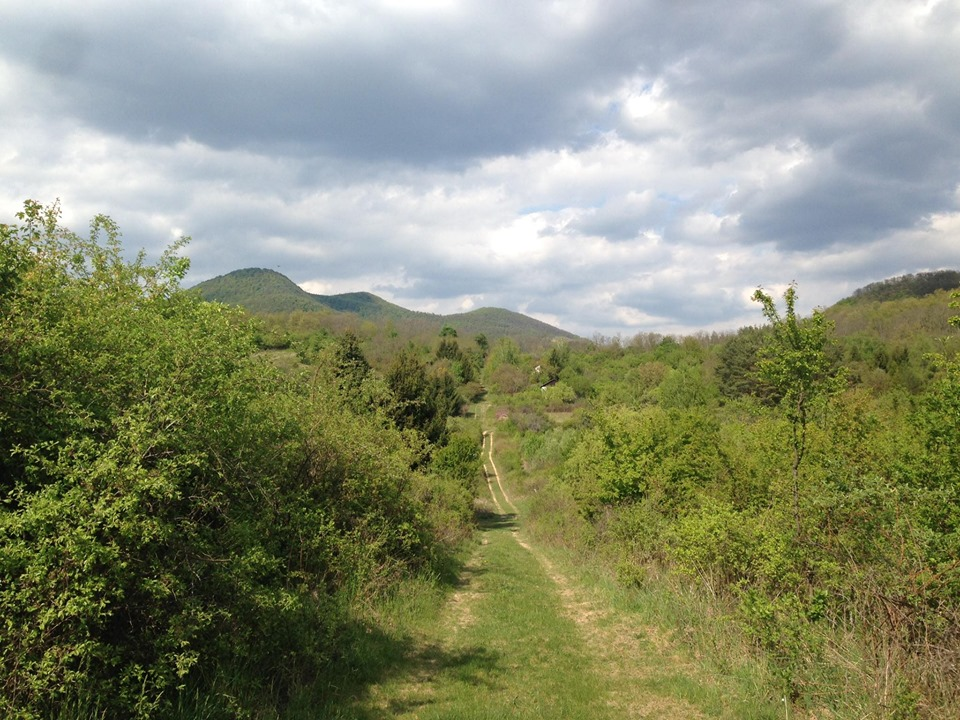
Karancsalja garden plots

The infrastructure (water, gas, drainage, telephone, cable TV) is fully developed, the roads have been renovated. A pavement was built on an 800 m-long (2,600 ft) section in the centre of the village.

The flag and coat of arms of the village were consecrated in 2000, and a memorial erected in honor of the victims of World War I & II was completed that year, and an ornamental park was established soon after. In 2003, the sports field was renovated.

A popular excursion destination is the "Tavas" recreation park, where cultural and sports programs are organized on public holidays. The most visited events in the village are the Village Day on the last Saturday of July, as well as the harvest parade and ball in early October.

In 2015, the Village Library opened in a new location. The bookstore, the children's corner, the furniture and the Internet browsing places create opportunities for everyone from young to old. The installed Internet creates a direct connection with the Balassi Bálint County Library.
