= Salgótarján District =

Coordinates: 48.1167°N 19.8000°E

Salgótarján District Salgótarjáni járás
- Districts of Hungary
- Flag Coat of arms

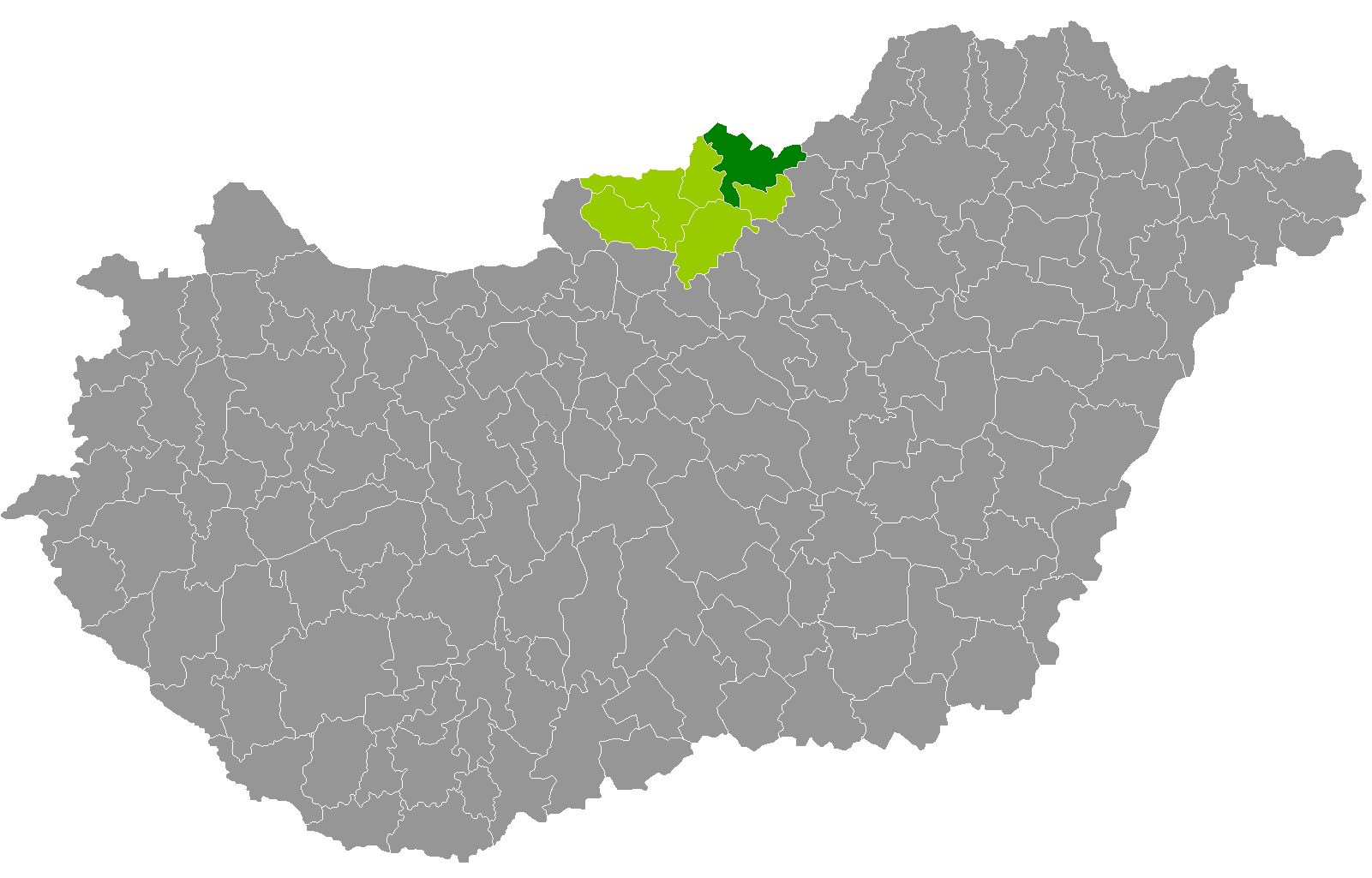
- Salgótarján District within Hungary and Nógrád County.
- Country: Hungary
- County: Nógrád
- District seat: Salgótarján

Area
  - Total: 525.23 km^{2} (202.79 sq mi)
  - Rank: 3rd in Nógrád

Population (2011 census)
  - Total: 64,601
  - Rank: 1st in Nógrád
  - Density: 123/km^{2} (320/sq mi)

Salgótarján (Hungarian: Salgótarjáni járás) is a district in north-eastern part of Nógrád County. Salgótarján is also the town where the district seat is found. The district is located in the Northern Hungary statistical region.

== Geography ==
Salgótarján District borders with the Slovak Banská Bystrica Region to the north, Ózd District (Borsod-Abaúj-Zemplén County) and Bátonyterenye District to the southeast, Pásztó District to the south, Szécsény District to the west. The number of the inhabited places in Salgótarján District is 29.

== Municipalities ==
The district has one town with county rights (bolded) and 28 villages. (ordered by population, as of 1 January 2013)

- Bárna (1,081)
- Cered (1,122)
- Egyházasgerge (741)
- Etes (1,429)
- Ipolytarnóc (452)
- Karancsalja (1,557)
- Karancsberény (884)
- Karancskeszi (1,905)
- Karancslapujtő (2,651)
- Karancsság (1,242)
- Kazár (1,870)
- Kisbárkány (194)
- Kishartyán (536)
- Litke (885)
- Lucfalva (631)
- Márkháza (252)
- Mátraszele (984)
- Mihálygerge (595)
- Nagybárkány (673)
- Nagykeresztúr (247)
- Rákóczibánya (677)
- Ságújfalu (1,059)
- **Salgótarján** (37,199) – district and county seat
- Sámsonháza (270)
- Somoskőújfalu (2,280)
- Sóshartyán (955)
- Szilaspogony (296)
- Vizslás (1,347)
- Zabar (490)

== Demographics ==
Religion in Salgótarján District (2011 census)
1. Catholic Church (47.7%)
2. Greek Catholicism (0.20%)
3. Lutheranism (1.80%)
4. Calvinism (1.80%)
5. Other religions (2.30%)
6. Non-religious (19.6%)
7. Atheists (1.20%)
8. Undeclared (25.4%)

In 2011, it had a population of 64,601 and the population density was 123/km^{2}.

Year	County population	Change
2011	64,601	n/a

=== Ethnicity ===
Besides the Hungarian majority, the main minorities are the Roma (approx. 5,500), Slovak (400) and German (200).

Total population (2011 census): 64,601
Ethnic groups (2011 census): Identified themselves: 62,958 persons:

- Hungarians: 56,484 (89.72%)
- Gypsies: 5,383 (8.55%)
- Others and indefinable: 1,091 (1.73%)

Approx. 1,500 persons in Salgótarján District did not declare their ethnic group at the 2011 census.

=== Religion ===
Religious adherence in the county according to 2011 census:

- Catholic – 30,966 (Roman Catholic – 30,846; Greek Catholic – 118);
- Evangelical – 1,182;
- Reformed – 1,136;
- other religions – 1,468;
- Non-religious – 12,682;
- Atheism – 750;
- Undeclared – 16,417.

== Gallery ==
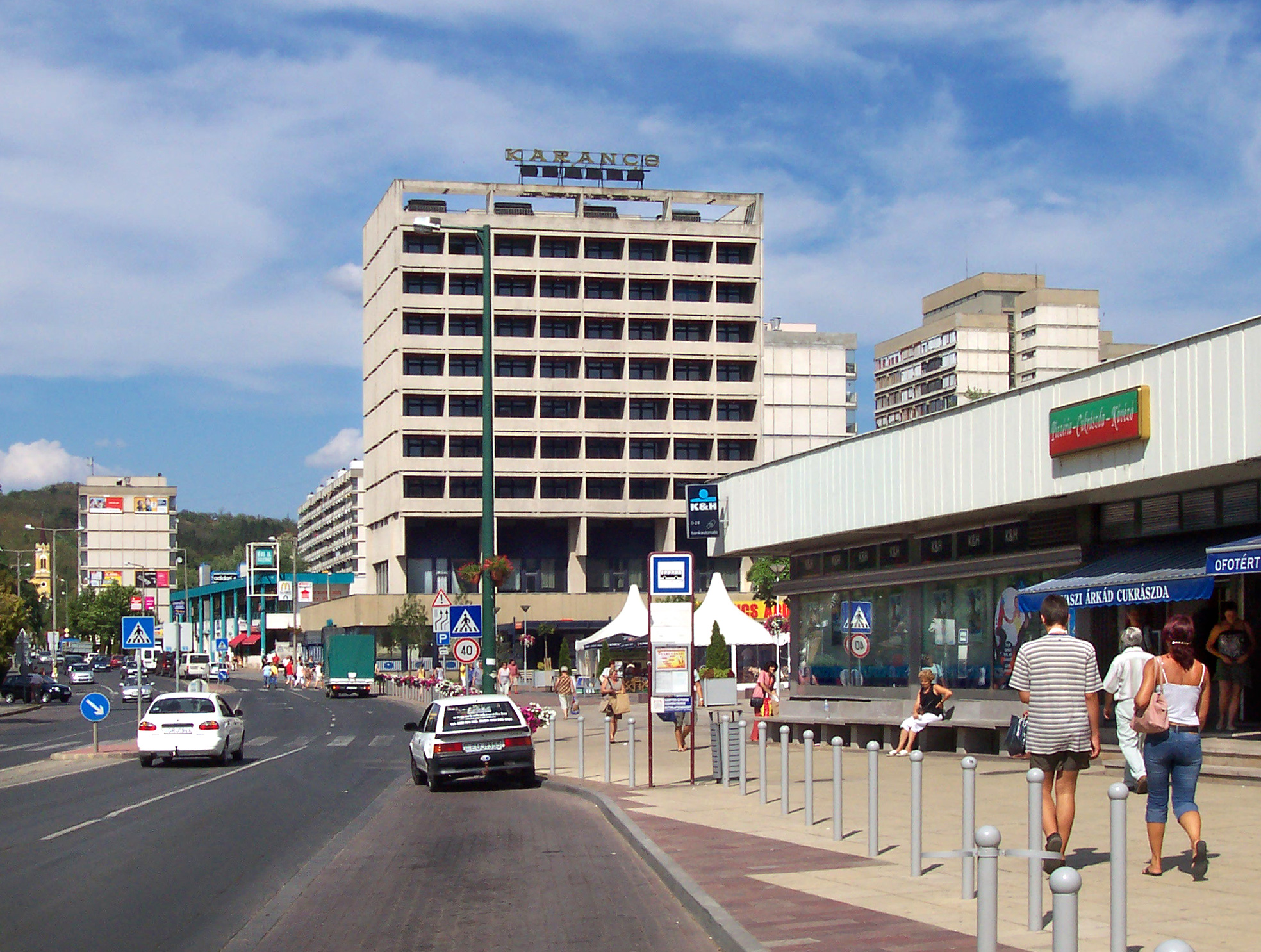
Downtown of Salgótarján

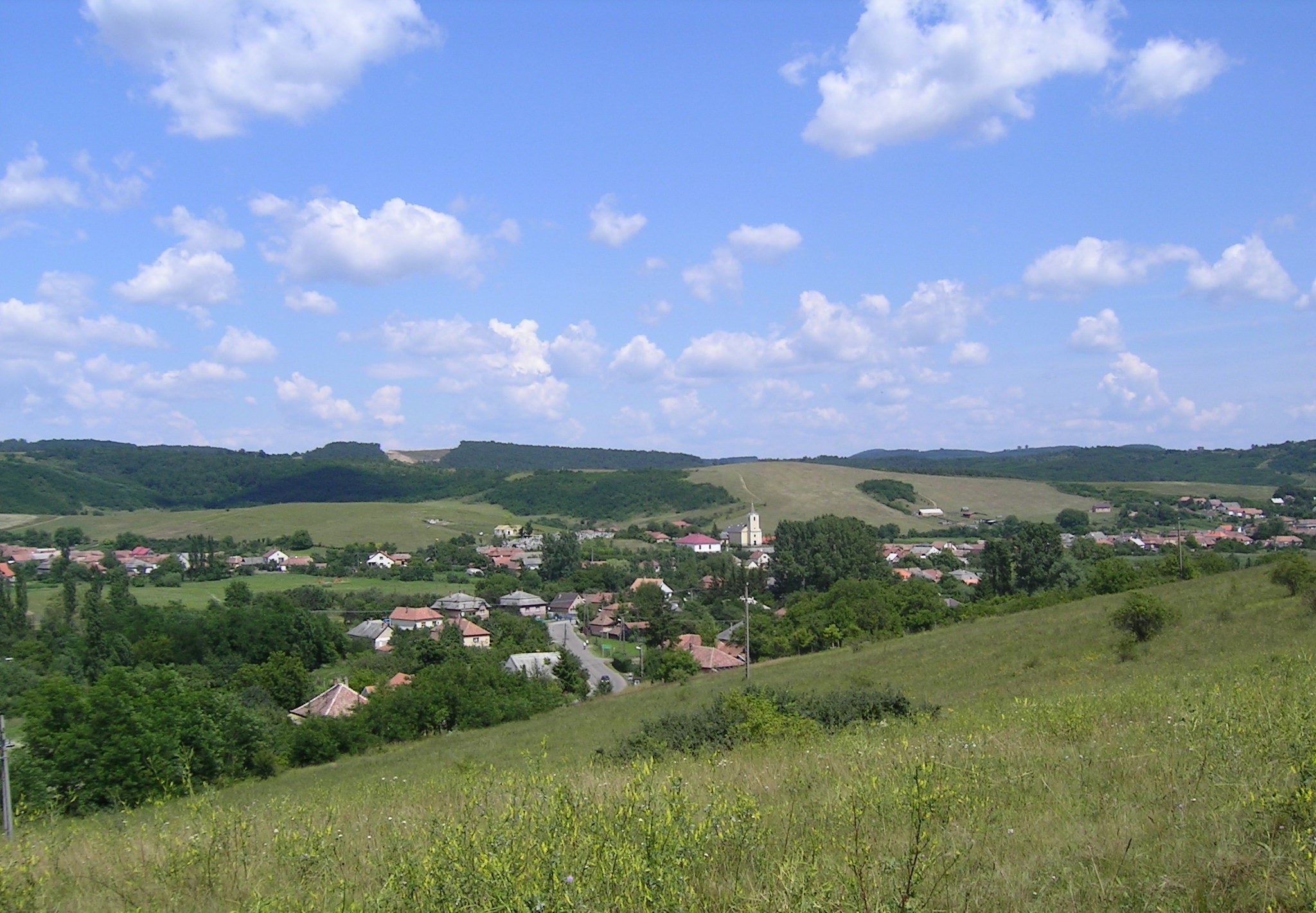
Aerial view of Kazár

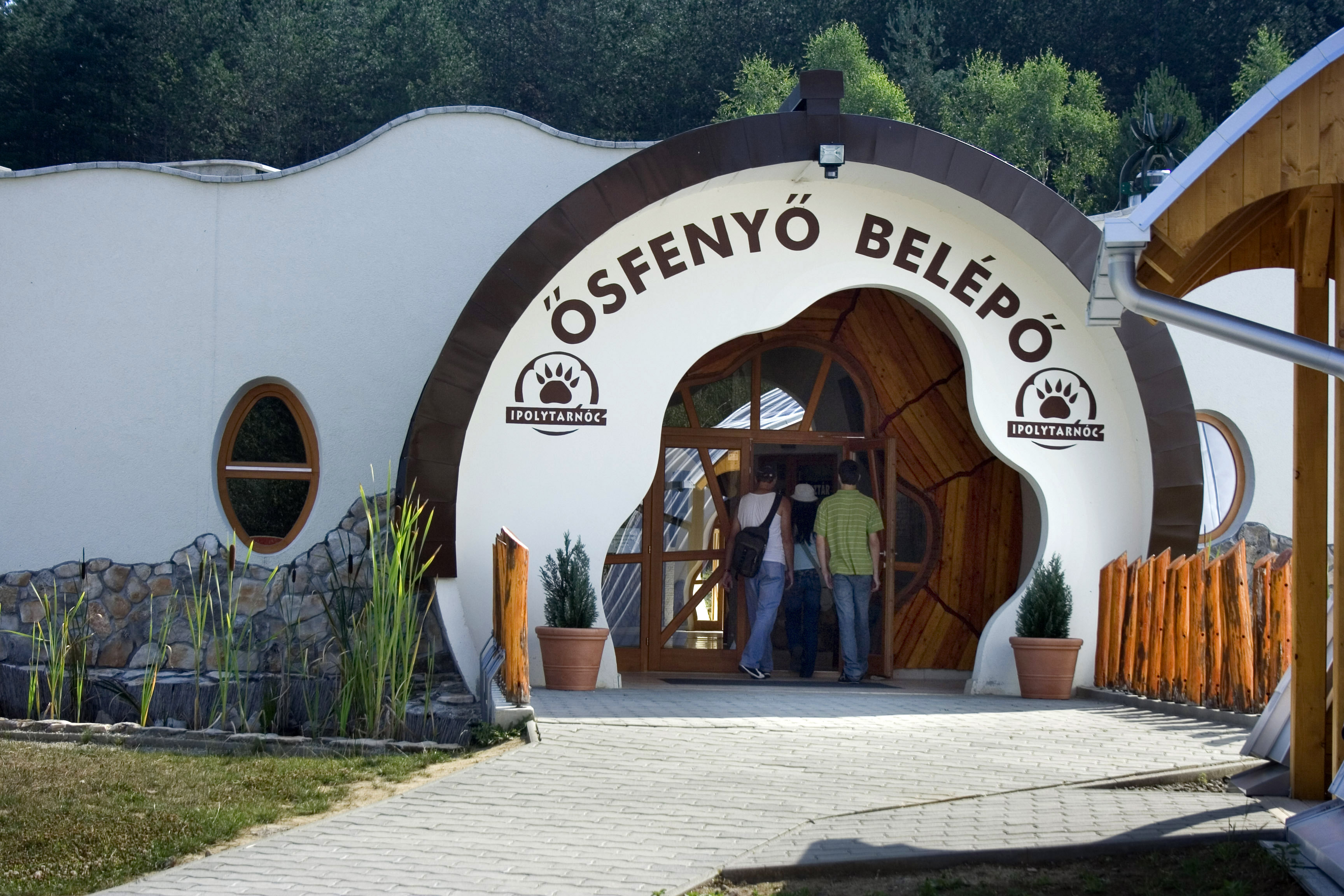
Nature Reserve Ipolytarnóc Fossils

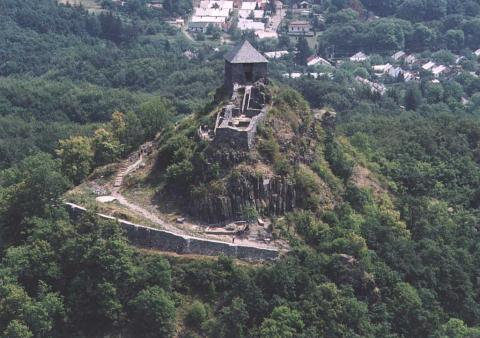
Salgó Castle

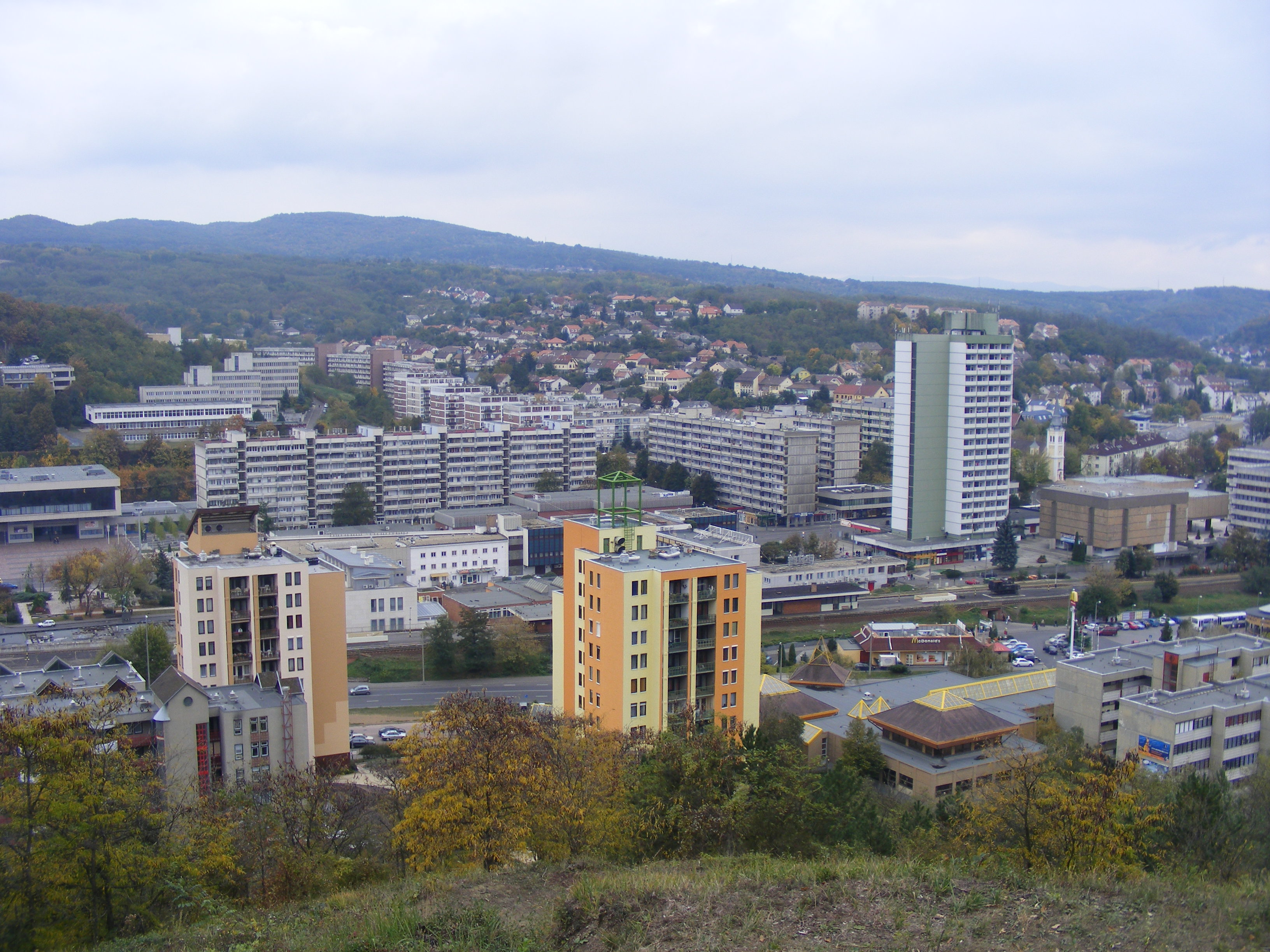
View of Salgótarján

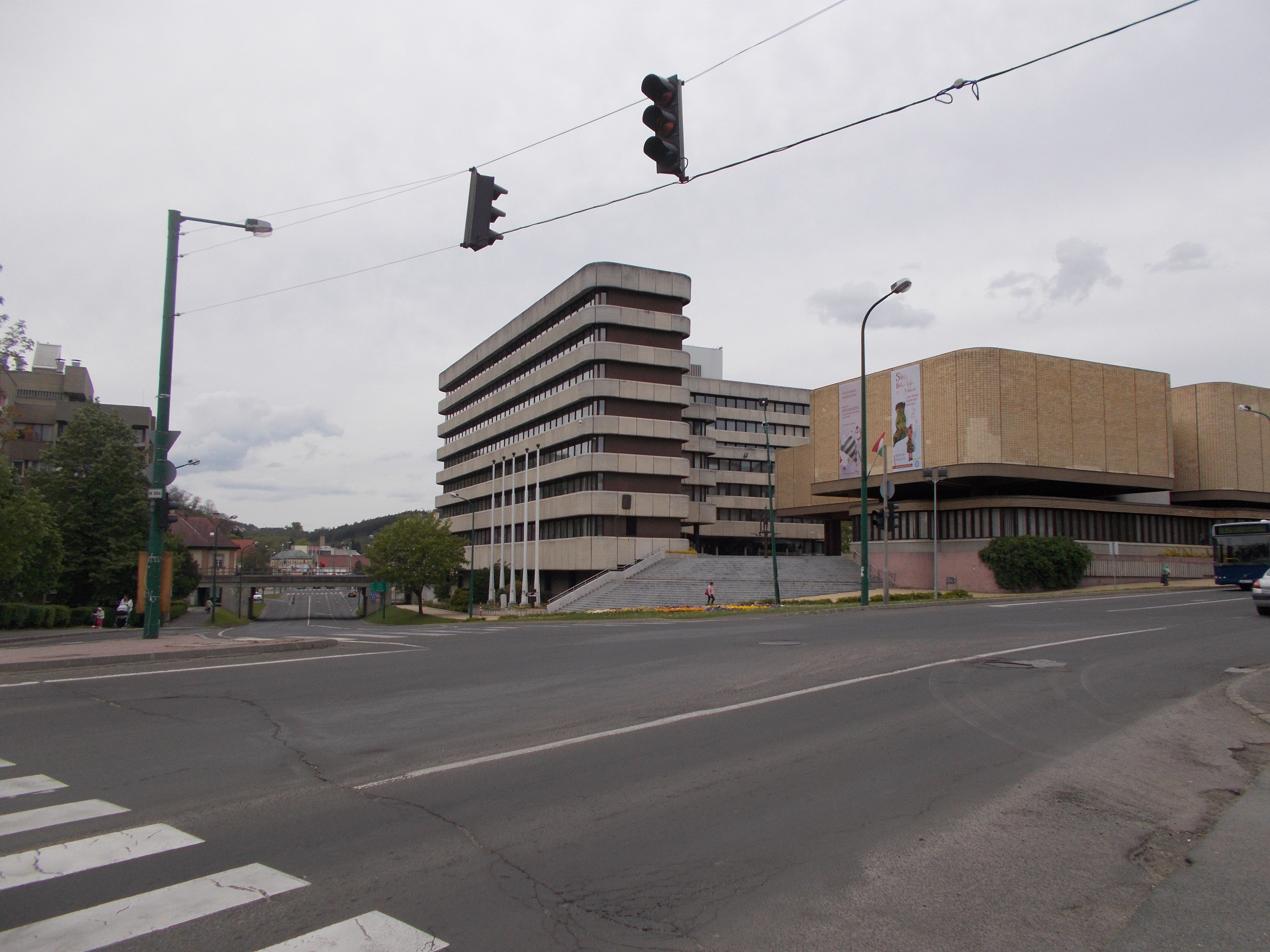
Town Hall in Salgótarján

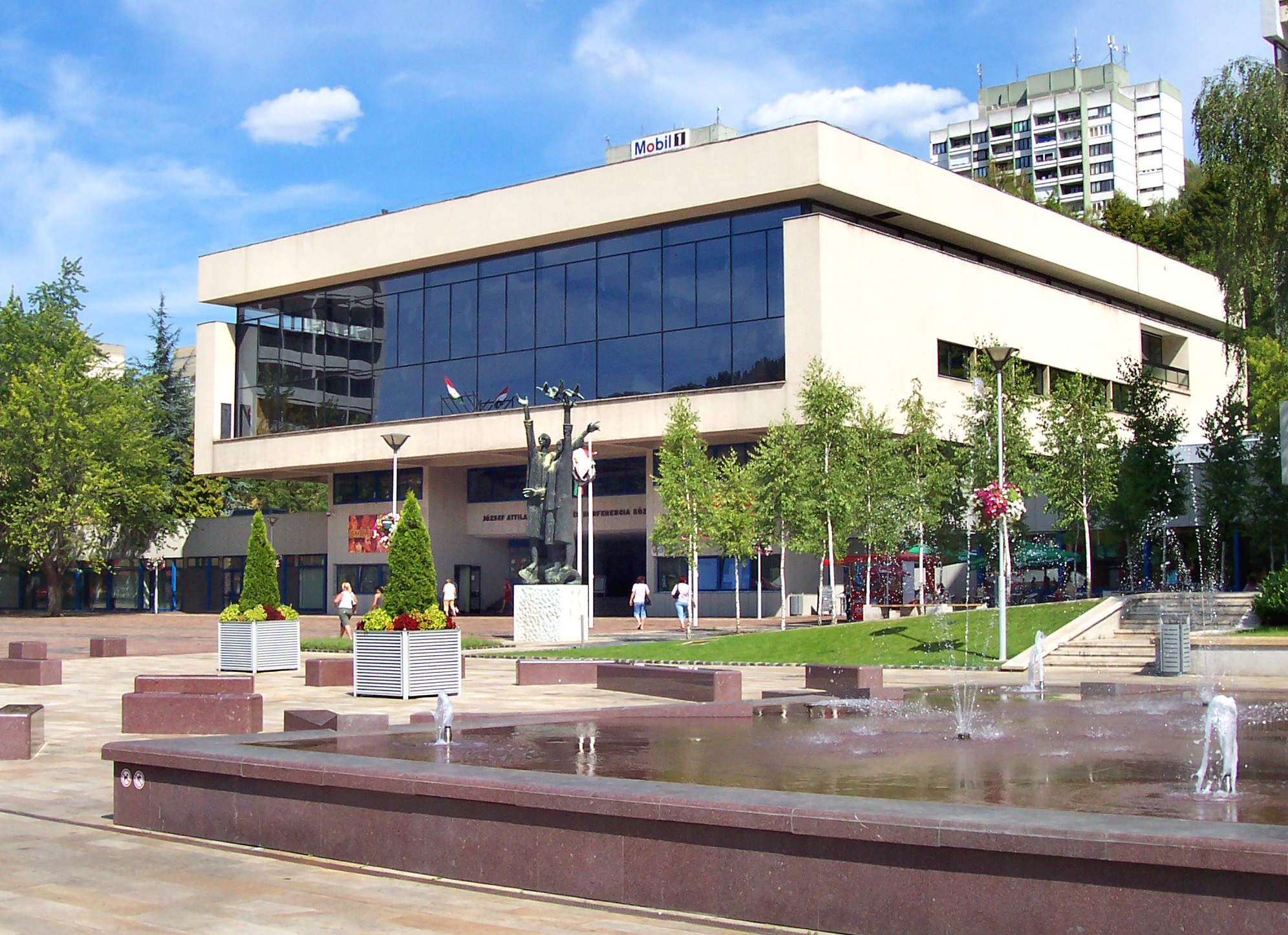
Conferential Centre (Salgótarján)

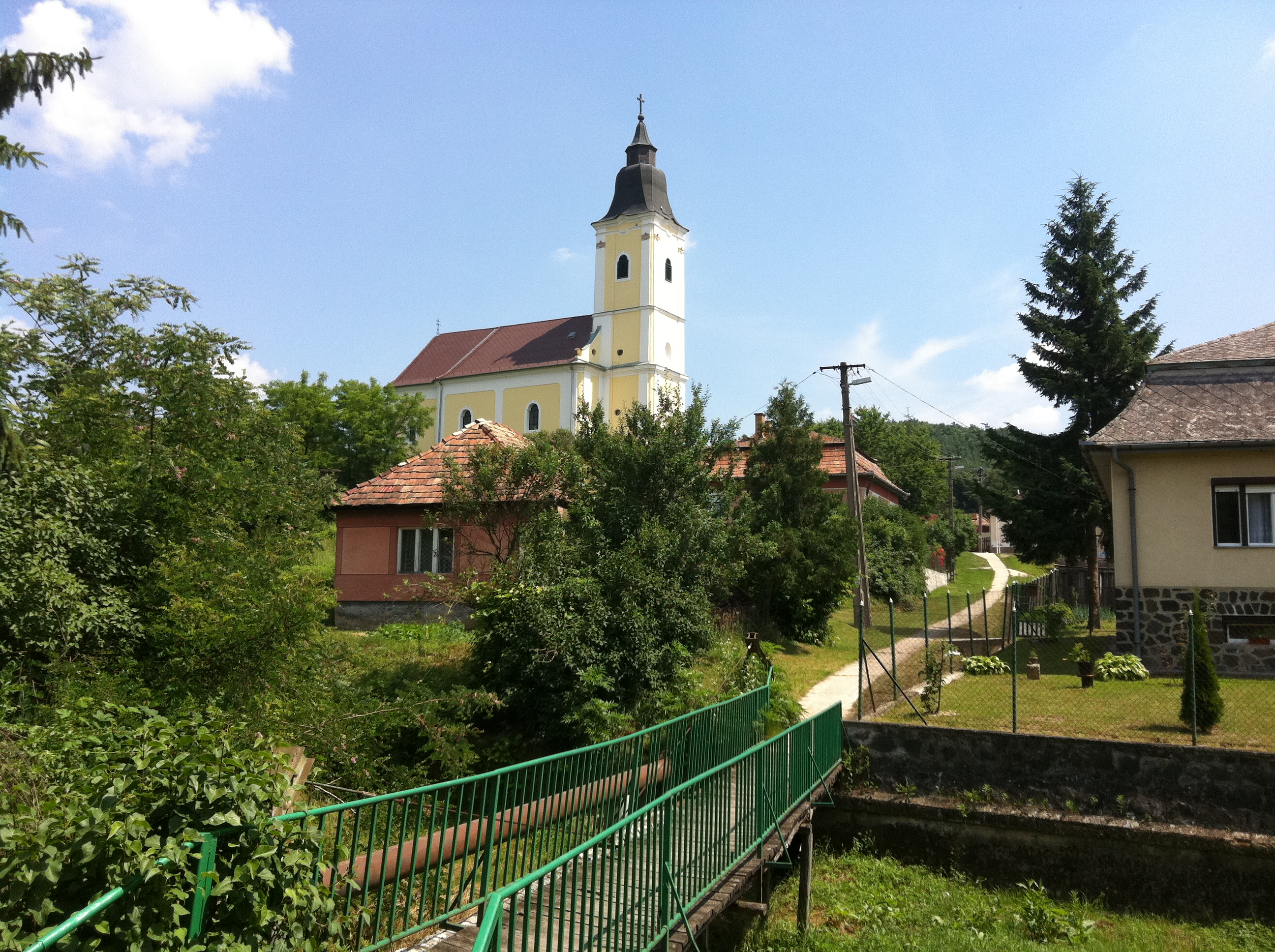
All Saints Church in Karancsberény

== See also ==
- List of cities and towns of Hungary
