= Kisbárkány =

Village in Nógrád County, Hungary

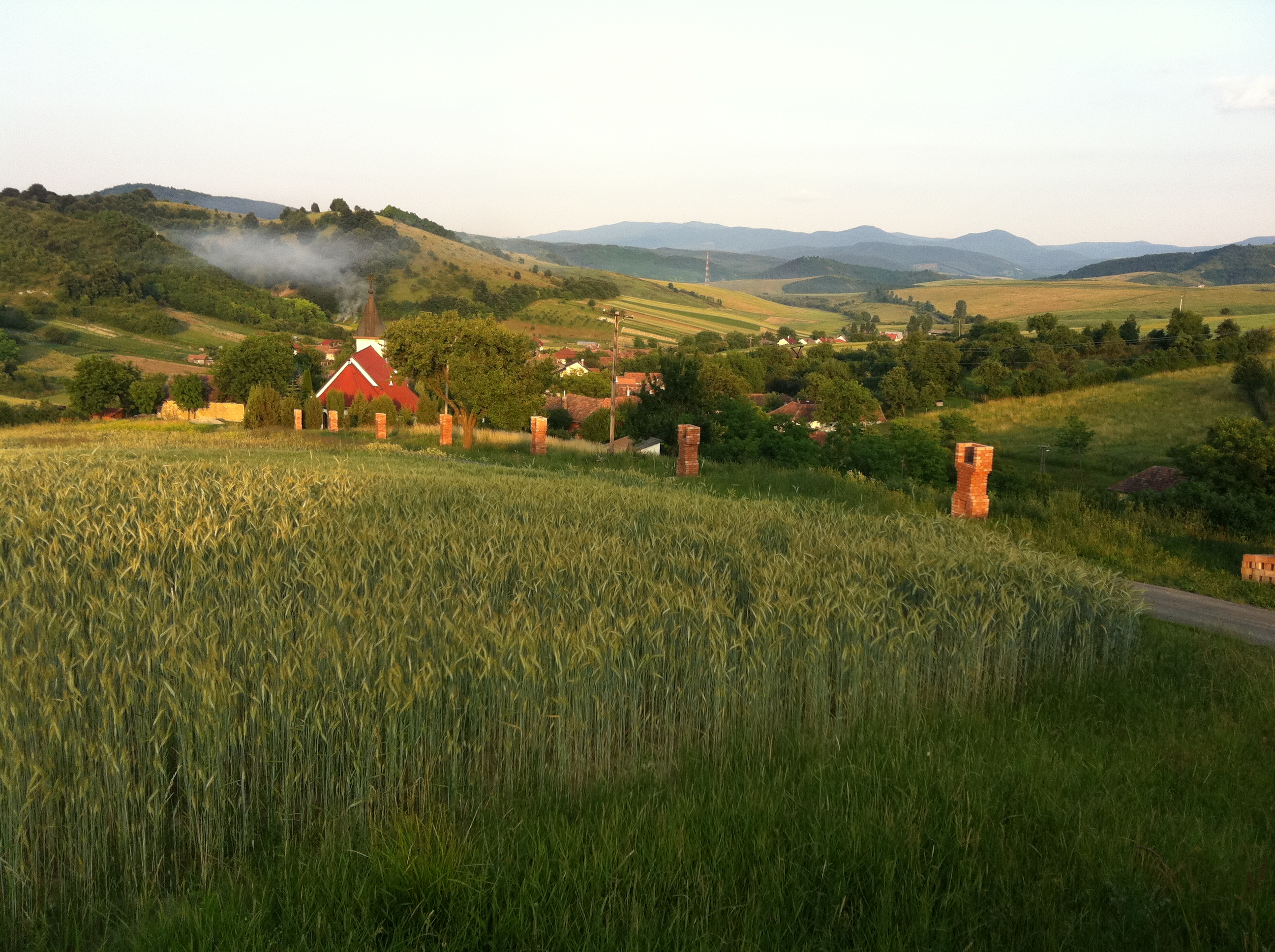
- A view of Kisbárkány.

- Location of Kisbárkány in Hungary.
- Coordinates: 48°1′N 19°41′E
- Country: Hungary
- Region: Northern Hungary
- County: Nógrád
- District: Salgótarján

Government
  - Mayor: Edőcs László (Ind.)

Area
  - Total: 8.03 km^{2} (3.10 sq mi)

Population (2022)
  - Total: 153
  - Density: 19.1/km^{2} (49.3/sq mi)
- Time zone: UTC+1 (CET)
  - Summer (DST): UTC+2 (CEST)
- Postal code: 3075
- Area code: 32

Kisbárkány is a village in Nógrád County, Hungary with 153 inhabitants (2022). The village is located in a narrow valley between the wooded hills of the Cserhát. In the wide valley adjacent to Kisbárkány, at the end of a dead end road, lies Bedepuszta, a small hamlet used as event village for international events, like Sziget Detox/Sziget Retreat. The population is mostly Hungarian, but a Dutch businessman named Elroy Thümmler purchased 21 of the houses in Bedepuszta, leaving just 3 that he did not own.

In WWII, the Bede valley was the site of a battle between the Russian and German armies. A monument to the fallen Russians can be found in Bedepuszta.
