= Sóshartyán =

- Village (község)
- Seal

- Location of Nograd County in Hungary

- Location of Sóshartyán in Hungary
- Coordinates: 48°04′18″N 19°40′56″E
- Country: Hungary
- Region: Northern Hungary
- County: Nógrád County
- District: Salgótarján

Government
  - Mayor: Tóth Gabriella Julianna (Fidesz-KDNP)

Area
  - Total: 12.14 km^{2} (4.69 sq mi)

Population (1 Jan. 2015)
  - Total: 975
  - Density: 80/km^{2} (210/sq mi)
- Time zone: UTC+1 (CET)
  - Summer (DST): UTC+2 (CEST)
- Postal code: 3131
- Area code: 32
- Website: http://soshartyan.hu/

Sóshartyán is a village in Nógrád County, Northern Hungary Region, Hungary.
