= Karancsság =

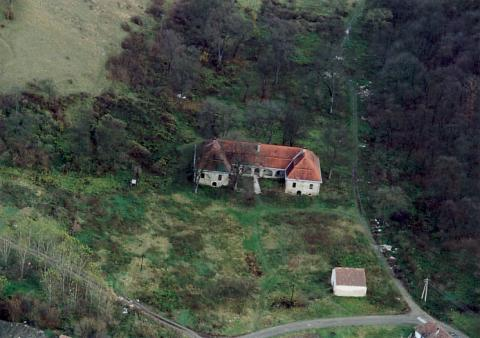

- Flag Coat of arms

- Location of Karancsság in Hungary
- Coordinates: 48°6′N 19°39′E
- Country: Hungary
- Region: Northern Hungary
- County: Nógrád
- District: Salgótarján

Area
  - Total: 21.39 km^{2} (8.26 sq mi)

Population (2015)
  - Total: 1,274
  - Density: 59.56/km^{2} (154.3/sq mi)
- Time zone: UTC+1 (CET)
  - Summer (DST): UTC+2 (CEST)
- Postal code: 3163
- Area code: +36 32
- KSH code: 26897
- Website: https://karancssag.info/

Karancsság is a village in Nógrád County, Hungary with 1,251 inhabitants (2014).
