= Mátraszele =

- Village
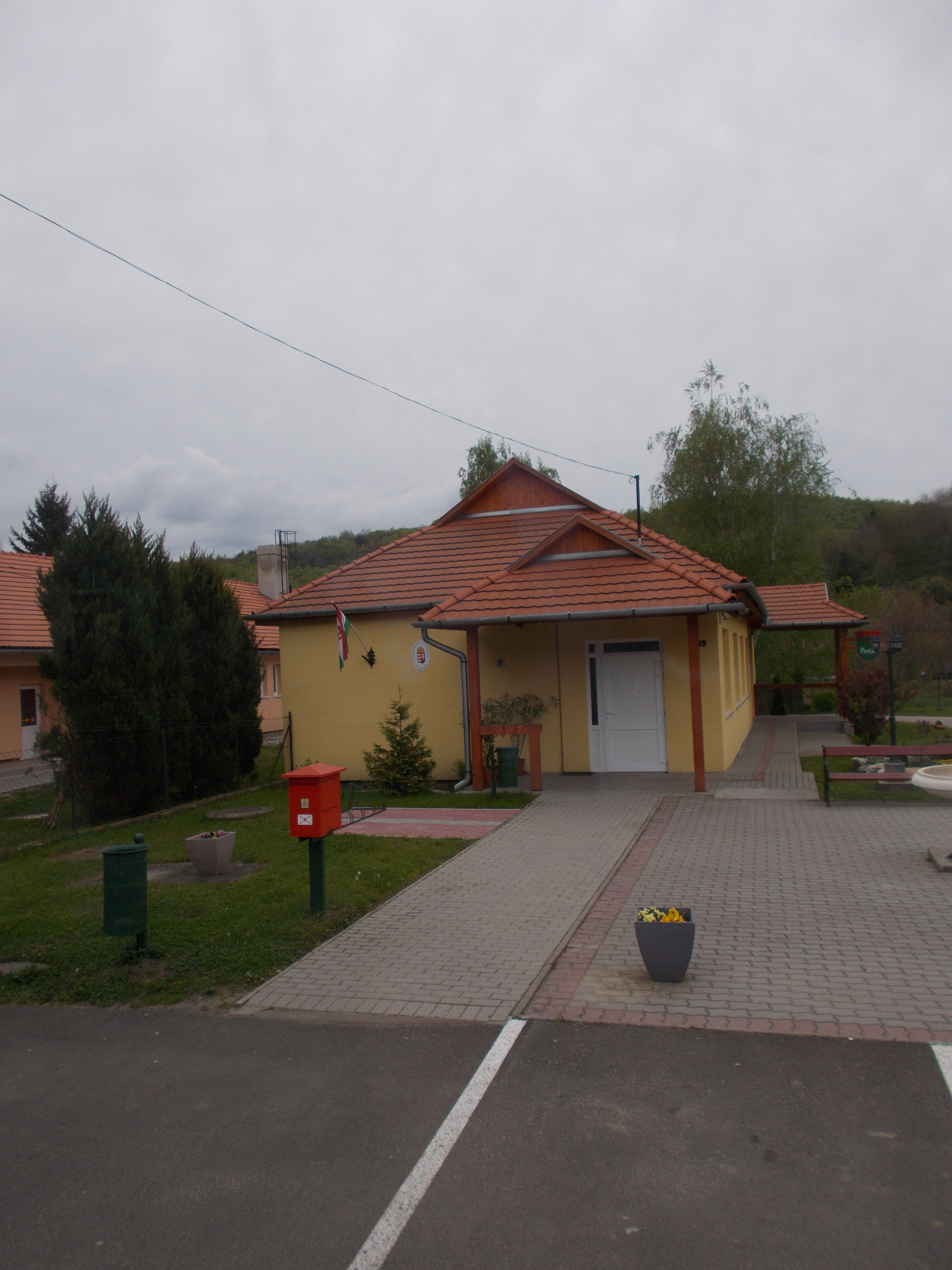
- Village hall and post office

- Coat of arms

- Location in Hungary
- Coordinates: 48°03′17″N 19°53′37″E
- Country: Hungary
- County: Nógrád
- District: Salgótarján
- First mentioned: 1304

Government
  - Mayor: László Kolozsvári (Ind.)

Area
  - Total: 16.97 km^{2} (6.55 sq mi)

Population (2022)
  - Total: 904
  - Density: 53.3/km^{2} (138/sq mi)
- Time zone: UTC+1 (CET)
  - Summer (DST): UTC+2 (CEST)
- Postal code: 3142
- Area code: 32
- Website: www.matraszele.hu/

Mátraszele is a village in Nógrád County, Hungary. The Zagyva river flows through the settlement. As of 2022 census, it has a population of 904 (see Demographics). The village is located 8.5 km from (Nr. 81) Hatvan–Fiľakovo railway line, 12.0 km far from Salgótarján, 10.4 km from the main road 21 and 52.8 km from the M3 motorway. The closest train station with public transport in Bátonyterenye 10.4 km away.

== History ==
The name of Mátraszele was mentioned for the first time between 1304-1321 in a deed as the property of the Rátót clan under the names Fel-Szele and Al-Szele. It became the property of the Lorántffy de Serke family in 1449. Pál Jánossy and Lestár Feleki owned it on 1548. The fate of the settlement in the 17th century is unknown. In Mátraszele were 10 families in 1715, and 9 families in 1720. At the beginning of the 19th century, it was owned by Count Pál Lázár and the Oláh family. At the end of the 19th century, several coal mines were opened, which were owned by the North Hungarian United Coal Company. Several mining communities were formed in connection with the mines, of which only Istvánbánya is inhabited nowadays. The church named as Patrona Hungariae.

== Demographics ==
According the 2022 census, 90.2% of the population were of Hungarian ethnicity, 2.2% were Gypsies, 0.6% were Romanian and 9.5% did not wish to answer. The religious distribution was as follows: 40.6% Roman Catholic, 16.1% non-denominational, and 39.0% did not wish to answer. 900 people live in the village and 2 person live at a mine site.

Population by years:

Year	1870	1880	1890	1900	1910	1920	1930	1941
Population	300	314	492	706	1006	961	1044	1194
Year	1949	1960	1970	1980	1990	2001	2011	2022
Population	1203	1284	1297	1221	1051	1046	992	904

== Politics ==
Mayors since 1990:

- 1990–2024: László Vincze (independent)
- 2024–: László Kolozsvári (independent)
