= Sámsonháza =

Sámsonháza Šamšon
- Village (község)
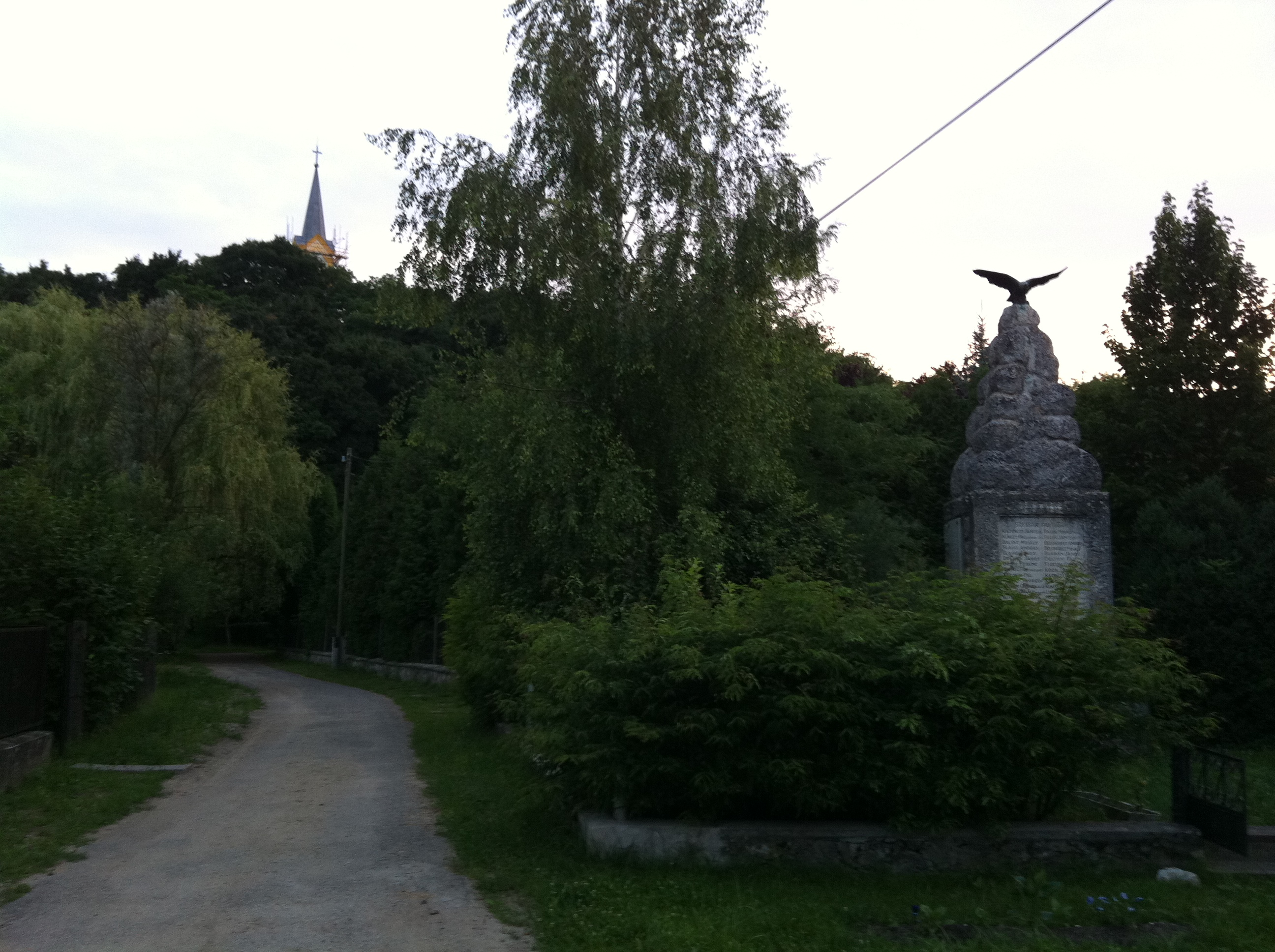
- World War I memorial. Church tower in background.

- Location of Nograd County in Hungary

- Location of Sámsonháza in Hungary
- Coordinates: 47°59′13″N 19°43′25″E
- Country: Hungary
- Region: Northern Hungary
- County: Nógrád County
- District: Salgótarján

Government
  - Mayor: Bajnokné Képes Gyöngyi (Ind.)

Area
  - Total: 12.71 km^{2} (4.91 sq mi)

Population (1 Jan. 2015)
  - Total: 265
  - Density: 21/km^{2} (54/sq mi)
- Time zone: UTC+1 (CET)
  - Summer (DST): UTC+2 (CEST)
- Postal code: 3074
- Area code: 32
- Website: http://samsonhaza.hu/

Sámsonháza (Slovak: Šamšon) is a village in Nógrád County, Northern Hungary Region, Hungary.
