= Etes =

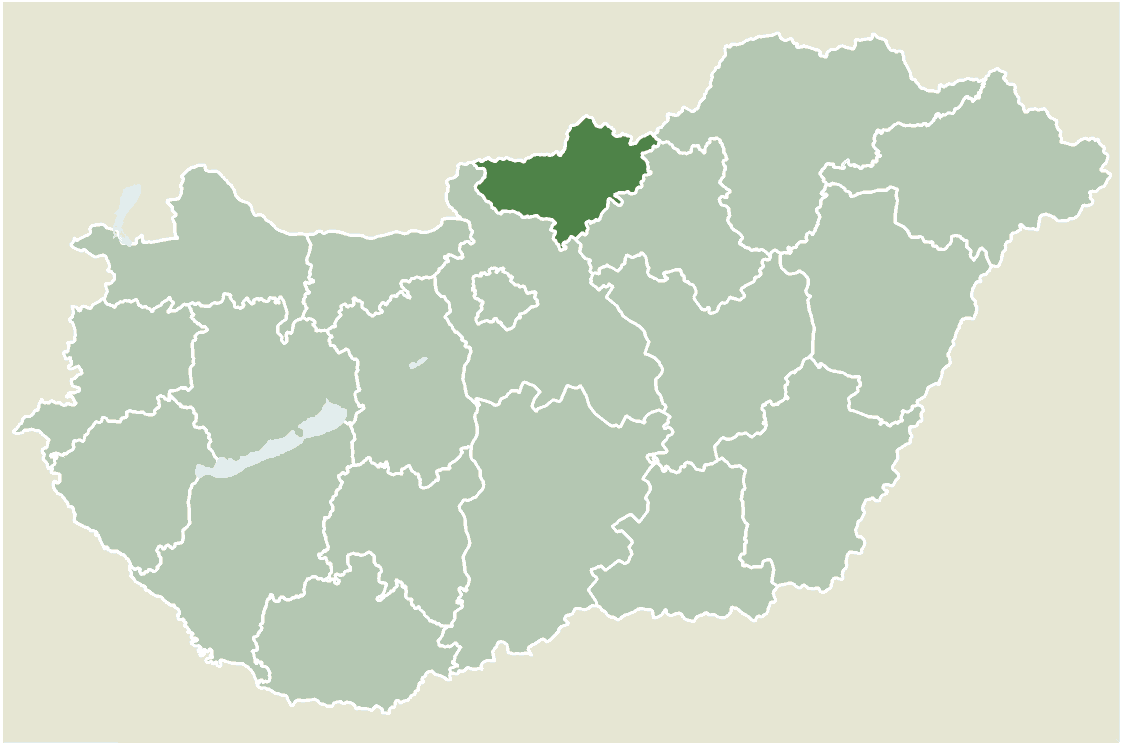
- Location of Nógrád county in Hungary

- Location of Etes
- Coordinates: 48.10984°N 19.71884°E
- Country: Hungary
- County: Nógrád
- District: Salgótarján

Area
  - Total: 15.8 km^{2} (6.1 sq mi)

Population (2004)
  - Total: 1,517
  - Density: 96.01/km^{2} (248.7/sq mi)
- Time zone: UTC+1 (CET)
  - Summer (DST): UTC+2 (CEST)
- Postal code: 3136
- Area code: 32

Etes is a village in Nógrád County, Hungary.

Population by year
Year	Population
1870	600
1880	619
1890	851
1900	1520
1910	2611
1920	2658
1930	2912
1941	2917
1949	2548
1960	2221
1970	2053
1980	1860
1990	1606
2001	1451
2011	1404
