= Ságújfalu =

- Village (község)
- Location of Nograd County in Hungary

- Location of Ságújfalu in Hungary
- Coordinates: 48°06′14″N 19°40′45″E
- Country: Hungary
- Region: Northern Hungary
- County: Nógrád County
- Subregion: Salgótarján

Government
  - Mayor: Szentes Attila (Ind.)

Area
  - Total: 12.03 km^{2} (4.64 sq mi)

Population (1 Jan. 2015)
  - Total: 1,023
  - Density: 85/km^{2} (220/sq mi)
- Time zone: UTC+1 (CET)
  - Summer (DST): UTC+2 (CEST)
- Postal code: 3162
- Area code: 32
- Website: http://sagujfalu.hu/

Ságújfalu is a village in Nógrád County, Northern Hungary Region, Hungary.
