= Karancs Hills =

Range of hills on the Hungarian–Slovak border

Coordinates: 48°13′N 19°48′E

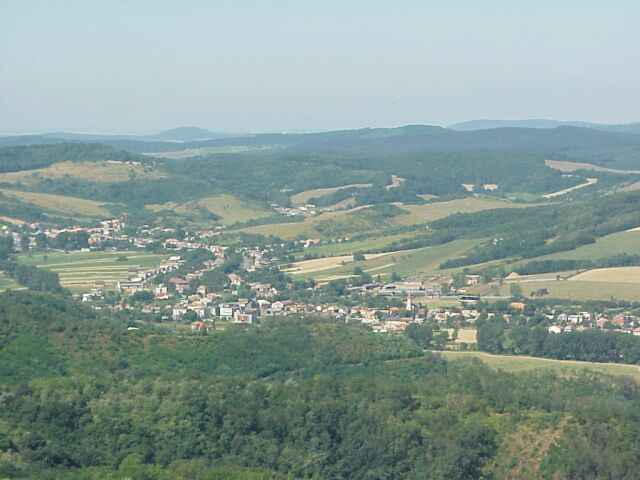
Karancs Hills

The Karancs Hills (Slovak: Mučínska vrchovina) are a range of hills on the Hungarian–Slovak border. The highest peak is the Karancs at 729 metres (2,392 ft) above sea level.
