= Kazár =

Village in Nógrád County, Hungary

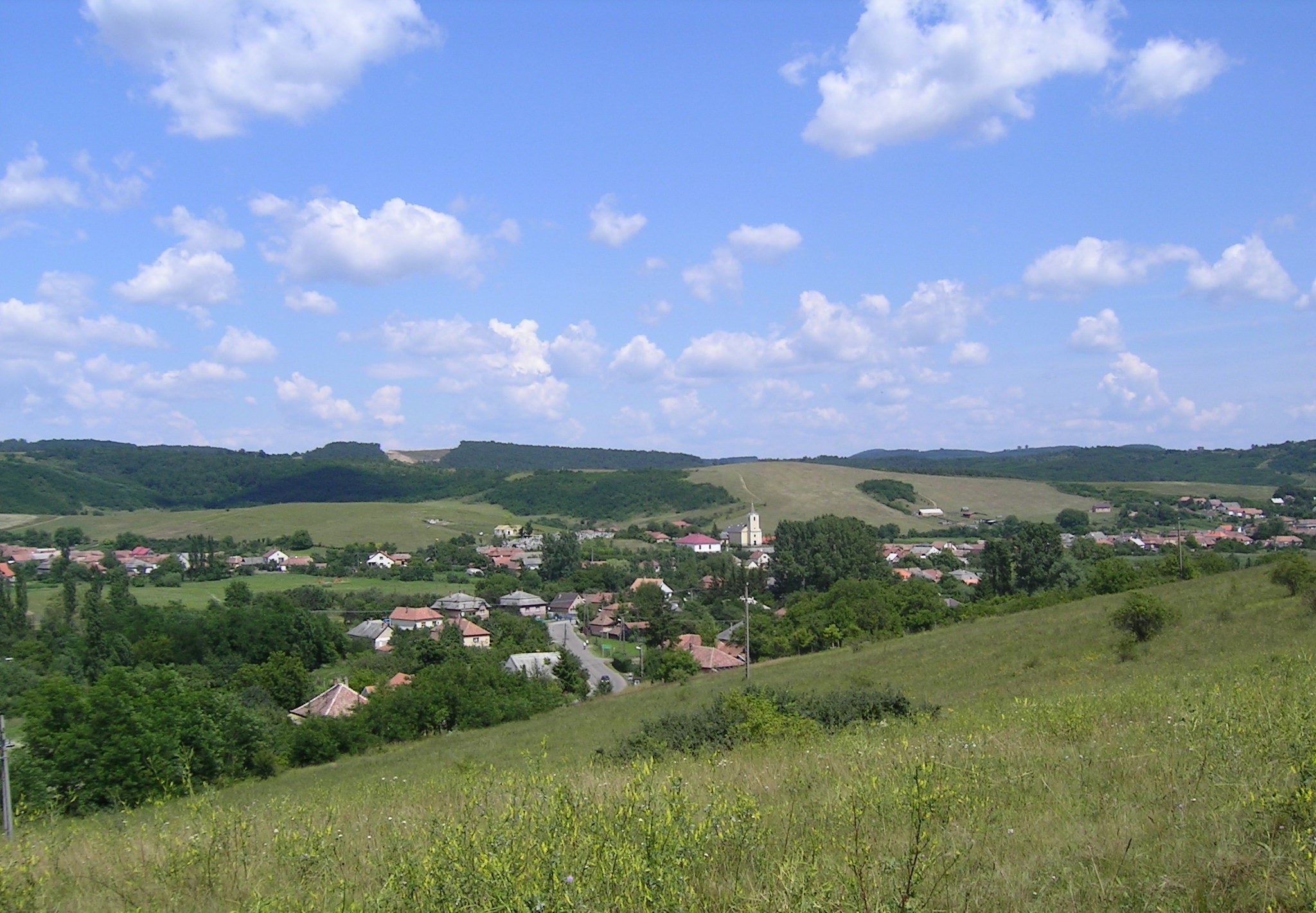
- A view of Kazár.

- Coat of arms

- Location of Kazár.
- Coordinates: 48°2′N 19°51′E
- Country: Hungary
- Region: Northern Hungary
- County: Nógrád

Government
  - Mayor: Gecse Ákos (Ind.)

Area
  - Total: 30.39 km^{2} (11.73 sq mi)

Population (2022)
  - Total: 1,646
  - Density: 54.16/km^{2} (140.3/sq mi)
- Time zone: UTC+1 (CET)
  - Summer (DST): UTC+2 (CEST)
- Postal code: 3127
- Area code: 32

Kazár is a village in Nógrád County, Hungary with 1,646 inhabitants (2022).
