= Karancslapujtő =

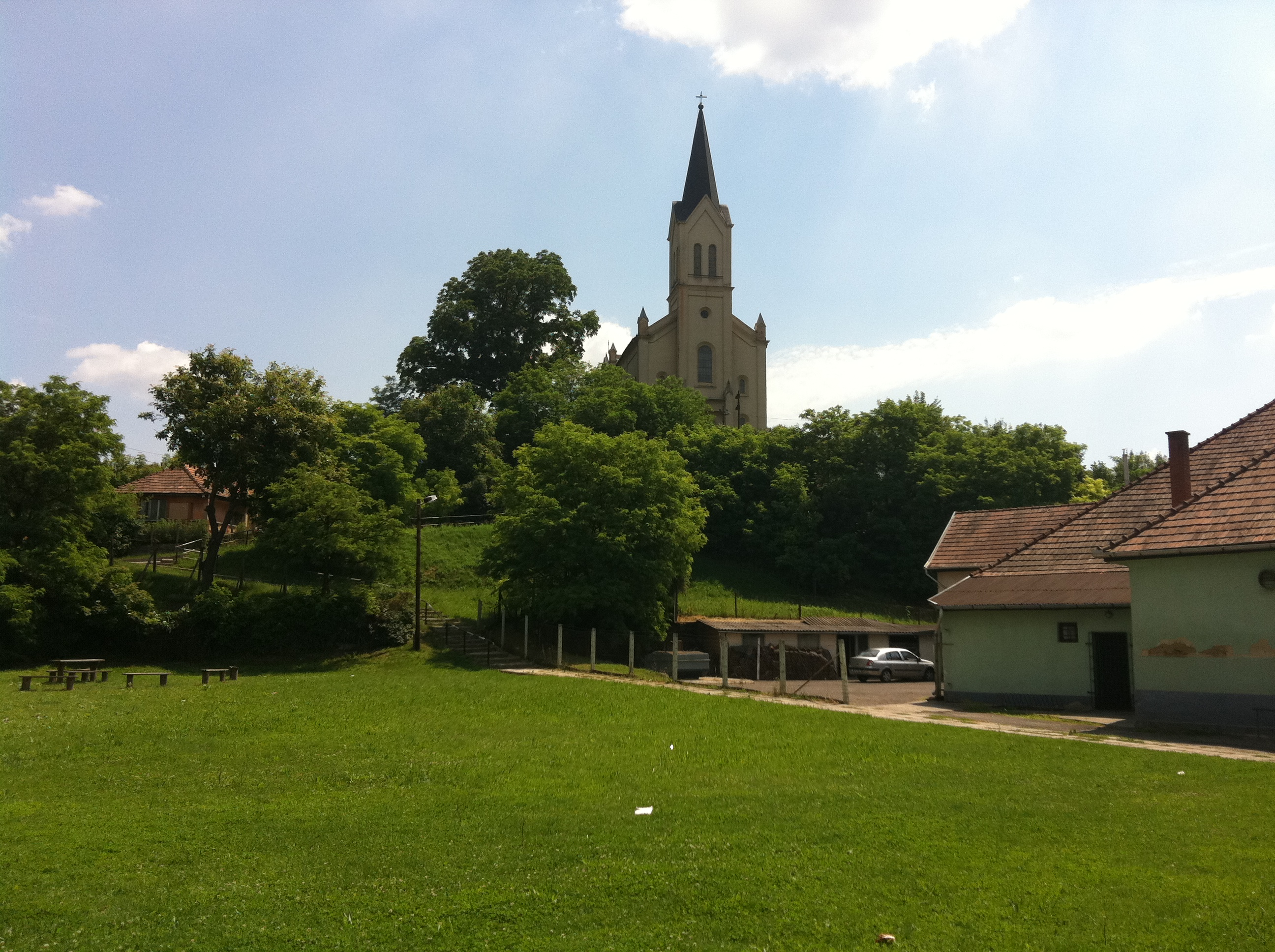
- A view of a church at Karancslapujtő.

- Coat of arms

- Location of Karancslapujtő in Hungary.
- Coordinates: 48°9′N 19°44′E
- Country: Hungary
- Region: Northern Hungary
- County: Nógrád
- District: Salgótarján

Government
  - Mayor: Baksa Sándor (Ind.)

Area
  - Total: 19.35 km^{2} (7.47 sq mi)

Population (2022)
  - Total: 2,371
  - Density: 122.5/km^{2} (317.4/sq mi)
- Time zone: UTC+1 (CET)
  - Summer (DST): UTC+2 (CEST)
- Postal code: 3182
- Area code: 32
- Website: www.karancslapujto.hu

Karancslapujtő is a village in Nógrád County, Hungary with 2,371 inhabitants (2022).
