= Karancs =

Peak on the Slovak-Hungarian border

Karanč / Karancs
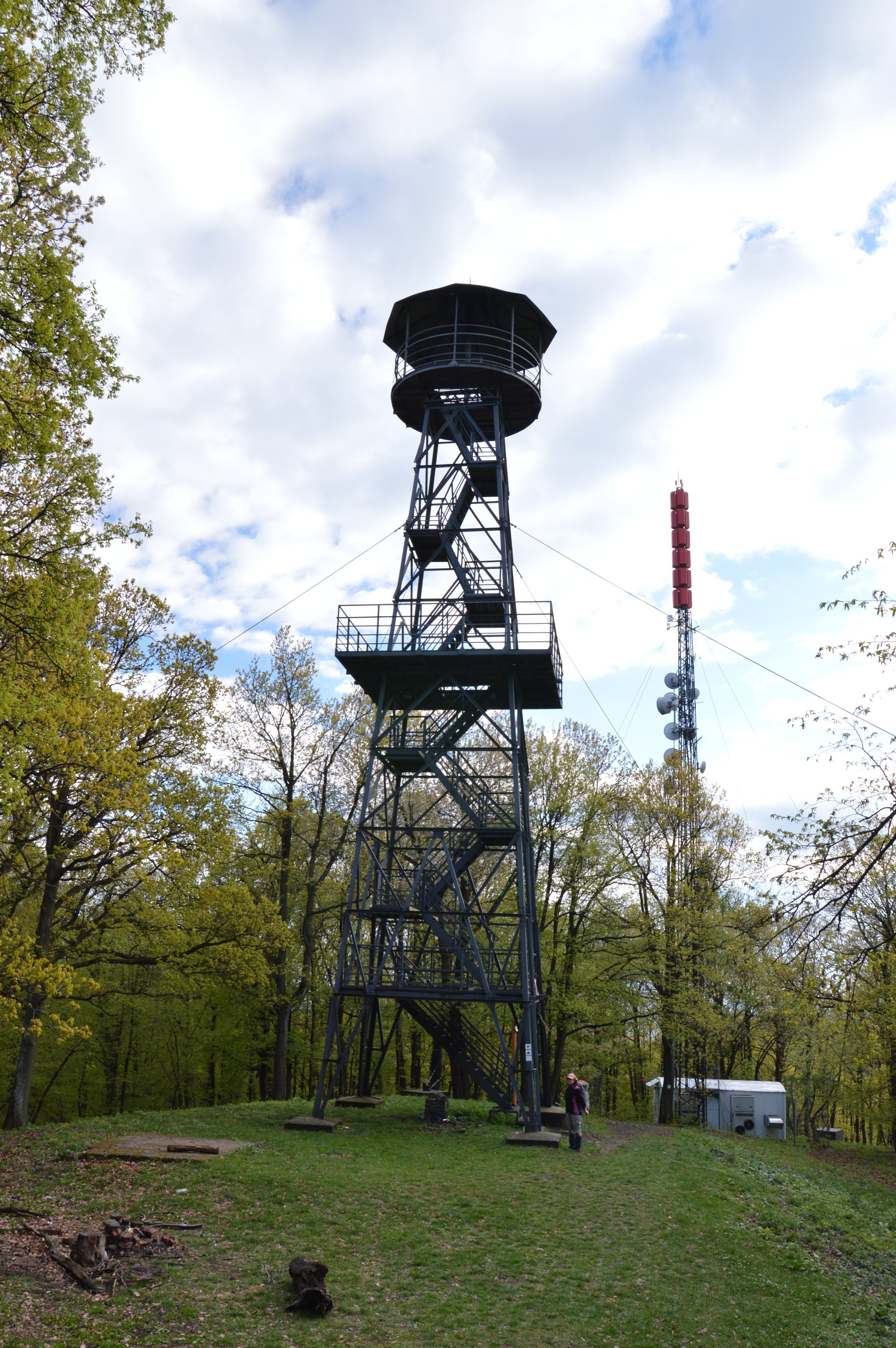
- The look-out tower

Highest point
- Elevation: 729 m (2,392 ft)
- Coordinates: 48°9′30″N 19°47′23″E

Naming
- English translation: Black
- Language of name: Pecheneg

Geography
- Location within Hungary
- Location: Nógrád county, Hungary / Banská Bystrica Region, Slovakia
- Parent range: Karancs Hills, Western Carpathians

Karancs (Slovak: Karanč) is the highest peak in the Karancs Hills with an elevation of 729 metres (2,392 ft). It lies on the Hungarian-Slovak border. In Hungary, the mountain forms part of the Karancs-Medves Protected Landscape Area, while in Slovakia it is included in the Cerová vrchovina Protected Landscape Area.

The name Karancs may be derived from the mountain's often dark green (almost black) colour. In Pecheneg and the other Middle Turkic languages, the word kara meant 'black', or from qurunçï 'sooty, charred felt'. Another possible etymology is that the word was formed from the toponymic base karant, derived from the Proto-Celtic *karn- and ultimately from the Proto-Indo-European *ḱerh₂- meaning "highest part of the body, horn", thus "tip, peak".

Karancs is a laccolith formed through volcanic activity in the Miocene.
