= Karancsberény =

- Village (község)
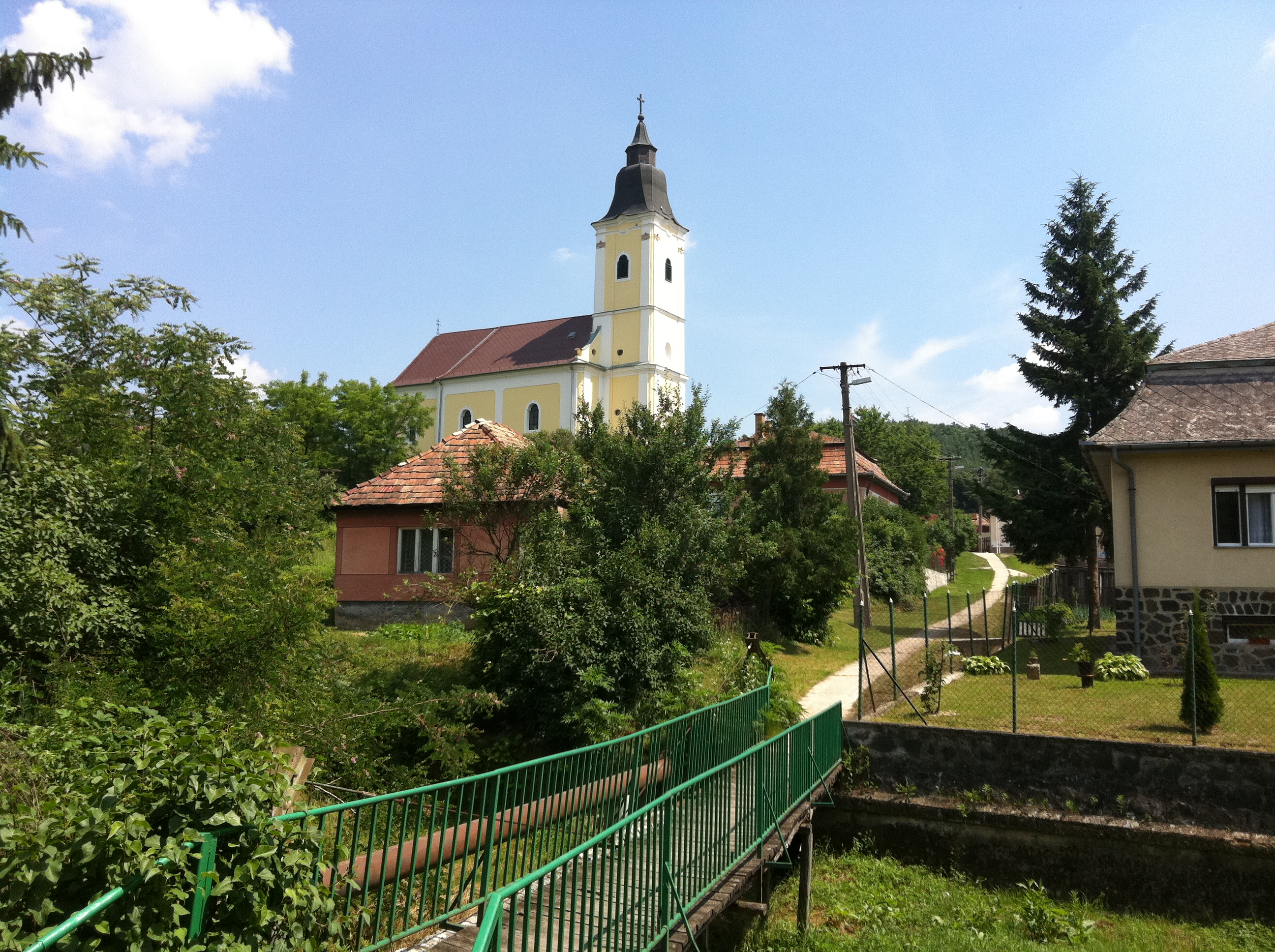
- Church of Karancsberény

- Coat of arms

- Location of Karancsberény in Hungary
- Coordinates: 48°11′16″N 19°44′39″E
- Country: Hungary
- Region: Northern Hungary
- County: Nógrád
- Subregion: Salgótarján

Government
  - Mayor: Erzsébet Csabainé Freistág

Area
  - Total: 23.14 km^{2} (8.93 sq mi)
- Elevation: 236 m (774 ft)

Population (1 January 2016)
  - Total: 846
  - Density: 36.6/km^{2} (94.7/sq mi)
- Time zone: UTC+1 (CET)
  - Summer (DST): UTC+2 (CEST)
- Postal code: 3137
- Area code: +36 32
- Website: https://karancsbereny.hu/

Karancsberény is a village in Nógrád County, Northern Hungary region, Hungary.

== Population ==
As of 1 January 2016, Karancsberény has a total population of 846 citizens, and a population density of 37/km^{2} (95/sq mi).
