= Litke, Hungary =

Litke
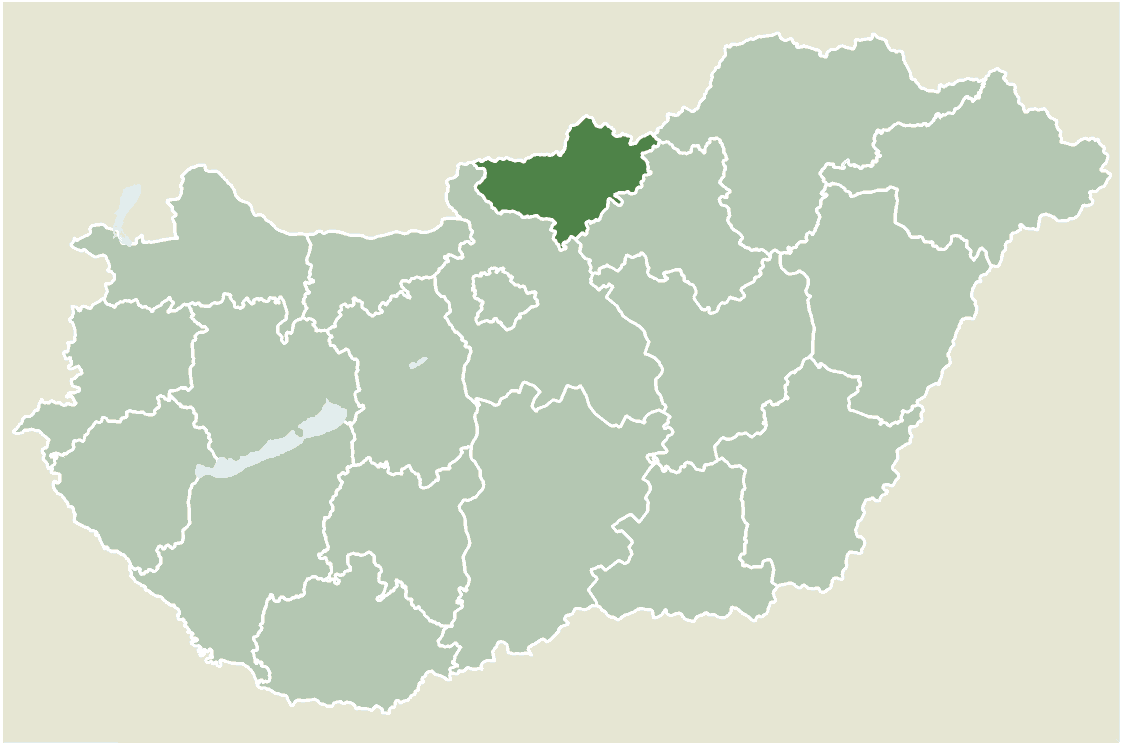
- Location of Nógrád county in Hungary

- Location of Litke
- Coordinates: 48.21000°N 19.59935°E
- Country: Hungary
- County: Nógrád

Area
  - Total: 18.16 km^{2} (7.01 sq mi)

Population (2004)
  - Total: 895
  - Density: 49.28/km^{2} (127.6/sq mi)
- Time zone: UTC+1 (CET)
  - Summer (DST): UTC+2 (CEST)
- Postal code: 3186
- Area code: 32

Litke (Slovak: Litkovce) is a village in Nógrád county, Hungary.
