= List of mountains in Hungary =

This list of mountains in Hungary is actually a series of sortable tables of major mountain peaks of Hungary. The summit of a mountain or hill may be measured or sorted in several ways.

1. The topographic elevation of a summit measures the height of the summit above a geodetic sea level. The first table below ranks the 10 highest major summits of Hungary by elevation with a prominence of 5 m or more. The second table is the same, just with a prominence of 100 m or more.
2. The topographic prominence of a summit is a measure of how high the summit rises above its surroundings. The third table below ranks the 20 most prominent summits of Hungary.
3. The highest summit of a given area. It could be an administrative region (e.g. county as it is in fourth table) or a mountain range as it is in fifth table.
4. The topographic isolation (or radius of dominance) of a summit measures how far the summit lies from its nearest point of equal elevation.

== Mountains by elevation ==
=== Mountains by elevation (with a prominence of 5 m or more) ===
List of mountains by elevation (with a prominence of 5 m or more)
Rank	Mountain	Height (m)	Prominence (m)	Range	County	Coordinates
1	Kékes	1014.0	774	Mátra	Heves County	47°52′21″N 20°00′30″E
2	Hidas-bérc	972.7	10	Mátra	Heves County	47°51′36″N 20°00′57″E
3	Galya-tető	964.7	349	Mátra	Heves County	47°54′59″N 19°54′59″E
4	Szilvási-kő	960.7	713	Bükk	Heves County	48°04′16″N 20°26′06″E
5	Péter-hegyese	960.4	8	Mátra	Nógrád County	47°55′05″N 19°55′19″E
6	Kettős-bérc-2	958.2	8	Bükk	Heves County	48°04′20″N 20°26′07″E
7	Istállós-kő	958.1	14	Bükk	Heves County	48°04′10″N 20°25′49″E
8	Bálvány	956.4	81	Bükk	Heves County	48°05′58″N 20°28′20″E
9	Körös-bérc	955.9	61	Bükk	Heves County	48°04′16″N 20°27′12″E
10	Virágos-sár-bérc	955.0	30	Bükk	Heves County	48°04′02″N 20°26′37″E

=== Mountains with a prominence of 100 m or more ===
Mountains by elevation (with a prominence of 100 m or more)
Rank	Mountain	Height (m)	Prominence (m)	Range	County	Coordinates
1	Kékes	1014.0	774	Mátra	Heves County	47°52′21″N 20°00′30″E
2	Galya-tető	964.7	349	Mátra	Heves County	47°54′59″N 19°54′59″E
3	Szilvási-kő	960.7	713	Bükk	Heves County	48°04′16″N 20°26′06″E
4	Csóványos	937.9	710	Börzsöny	Pest County, Nógrád County	47°56′57″N 18°56′54″E
5	Nagy-Milic	894.7	585	Zemplén Mountains	Borsod-Abaúj-Zemplén County	48°34′36″N 21°27′29″E
6	Írott-kő	884.0	414	Kőszeg Mountains	Vas County	47°21′10″N 16°26′02″E
7	Tót-hegyes	815.8	170	Mátra	Heves County	47°52′22″N 19°49′56″E
8	Muzsla	805.1	180	Mátra	Nógrád County	47°53′16″N 19°45′33″E
9	Gergely-hegy	783.2	428	Zemplén Mountains	Borsod-Abaúj-Zemplén County	48°24′58″N 21°18′37″E
10	Pilis-tető	755.5	606	Pilis Mountains	Pest County	47°41′19″N 18°52′25″E

== Mountains by prominence ==
Mountains by prominence
Rank	Mountain	Prominence (m)	Height (m))	Range	Coordinates
1	Kékes	774	1014	Mátra	47°52′21″N 20°00′30″E
2	Szilvási-kő	713	961	Bükk	48°04′16″N 20°26′06″E
3	Csóványos	710	938	Börzsöny	47°56′57″N 18°56′54″E
4	Pilis-tető	606	756	Pilis Mountains	47°41′19″N 18°52′25″E
5	Nagy-Milic	585	895	Zemplén Mountains	48°34′36″N 21°27′29″E
6	Zengő	537	682	Mecsek	46°10′50″N 18°22′45″E
7	Karancs	497	727	Karancs Hills	48°09′32″N 19°47′27″E
8	Kőris-hegy	492	711	Bakony	47°17′40″N 17°45′23″E
9	Gergely-hegy	428	783	Zemplén Mountains	48°24′59″N 21°18′44″E
10	Írott-kő	414	884	Kőszeg Mountains	47°21′10″N 16°26′02″E
11	Gerecse	408	633	Gerecse	47°40′45″N 18°29′21″E
12	Nagy-Kopasz	403	528	Zemplén Mountains	48°07′15″N 21°23′03″E
13	Naszály	402	652	Cserhát	47°50′03″N 19°09′13″E
14	Fekete-hegy	351	576	Zemplén Mountains	48°26′22″N 21°33′50″E
15	Galya-tető	349	965	Mátra	47°54′59″N 19°54′59″E
16	Szokolya	334	607	Zemplén Mountains	48°15′54″N 21°17′57″E
17	Szár-hegy	331	521	Aggtelek Karst	48°28′48″N 20°44′05″E
18	Magas-hegy	309	514	Zemplén Mountains	48°24′08″N 21°38′01″E
19	Purga	305	575	Cserhát	47°57′30″N 19°38′39″E
20	Magoska	299	734	Zemplén Mountains	48°21′00″N 21°17′12″E

== Highest mountain of each county and Budapest ==
Highest mountain of each county and Budapest
Rank	County	Peak	Height (m))	Range	Coordinates
1	Heves County	Kékes	1014	Mátra	47°52′21″N 20°00′30″E
2	Nógrád County	Péter-hegyese	960	Mátra	47°55′05″N 19°55′19″E
3	Borsod-Abaúj-Zemplén County	Felső-Borovnyák	945	Bükk	48°05′56″N 20°29′26″E
4	Pest County	Csóványos	938	Börzsöny	47°56′57″N 18°56′54″E
5	Vas County	Írott-kő	884	Kőszeg Mountains	47°21′10″N 16°26′02″E
6	Veszprém County	Kőris-hegy	711	Bakony	47°17′40″N 17°45′16″E
7	Komárom-Esztergom County	Dobogókő	700	Visegrád Hills	47°43′10″N 18°54′10″E
8	Baranya County	Zengő	682	Mecsek	46°10′50″N 18°22′39″E
9	Győr-Moson-Sopron County	Kék-hegy	661	Bakony	47°18′18″N 17°46′03″E
10	Tolna County	Dobogó	594	Mecsek	46°13′33″N 18°21′40″E
11	Budapest	János Hill	527	Buda Hills	47°31′05″N 18°57′33″E
12	Fejér County	Csóka-hegy, Köves-domb	479	Vértes, Bakony	47°22′14″N 18°15′20″E, 47°16′23″N 18°04′48″E
13	Zala County	Köves-tető	444	Keszthely Mountains	46°49′07″N 17°19′46″E
14	Somogy County	Alman-tető	316	Külső-Somogy	46°46′19″N 17°52′52″E
15	Szabolcs-Szatmár-Bereg County	Bárci-tető	220	Kaszonyi-hegy	48°15′02″N 22°29′00″E
16	Bács-Kiskun County	Ólom-hegy	172	Illancs	46°15′46″N 19°05′21″E
17	Hajdú-Bihar County	Sós-hegy	172	Nyírség	47°41′20″N 21°52′20″E
18	Jász-Nagykun-Szolnok	Hármas-határ	136	Jászság	47°37′16″N 19°45′29″E
19	Csongrád County	Bukor-hegy	130	Bácskai-síkvidék	46°15′46″N 19°42′37″E
20	Békés County	Livius-halom	107	Csanádi-hát	46°15′43″N 20°55′19″E

== Location ==
Location of Highest mountain of each county and Budapest

== Lists of mountain ranges in Hungary ==
Lists of mountain ranges in Hungary
Rank	Range	Map	Mountain	Height (m)	Coordinates
1	Mátra		Kékes	1014	47°52′21″N 20°00′30″E
2	Bükk		Szilvási-kő	961	48°04′16″N 20°26′06″E
3	Börzsöny		Csóványos	938	47°56′57″N 18°56′54″E
4	Zemplén Mountains		Nagy-Milic	895	48°34′36″N 21°27′29″E
5	Alpokalja		Írott-kő	884	47°21′10″N 16°26′02″E
6	Pilis Mountains		Pilis-tető	756	47°41′19″N 18°52′25″E
7	Karancs Hills		Karancs	727	48°09′32″N 19°47′27″E
8	Bakony		Kőris-hegy	711	47°17′40″N 17°45′23″E
9	Visegrád Hills		Dobogókő	700	47°43′10″N 18°54′10″E
10	Mecsek		Zengő	682	46°10′50″N 18°22′45″E
11	Cserhát		Naszály	652	47°50′03″N 19°09′13″E
12	Gerecse		Gerecse	633	47°40′45″N 18°29′21″E
13	Aggtelek Karst		Fertős-tető	604	48°30′42″N 20°33′55″E
14	Buda Hills		Nagy-Kopasz	559	47°33′07″N 18°51′55″E
15	Sopron Mountains		Magas-bérc	557	47°39′06″N 16°27′51″E
16	Vértes Hills		Nagy-Csákány	487	47°30′02″N 18°27′45″E
17	Keszthely Mountains		Köves-tető	444	46°49′07″N 17°19′47″E
18	Velence Hills		Meleg-hegy	352	47°15′30″N 18°35′49″E
19	Cserehát		Kecske-pad	340	48°25′30″N 20°52′35″E
20	Outer-Somogy		Almán-tető	316	46°46′19″N 17°52′52″E

== List of the most isolated summits of Hungary ==
List of the most isolated summits of Hungary
Rank	Mountain	Isolation (km)	Height (m)	Coordinates	Nearest higher neighbour	Height (m)
1	Köris-hegy; Bakony	94,6	710,6	47°17′40″N 17°45′16″E	Pilis-tető; Pilis Mountains	757
2	Zengő; Mecsek	87,5	679,9	46°10′48″N 18°22′38″E	Kapovac; Krndija	792
3	Kékes; Mátra	82,6	1014,0	47°52′22″N 20°00′34″E	Javorie; Javorie	1044
4	Csóványos; Börzsöny	50,6	938,2	47°56′57″N 18°56′54″E	Sitno; Štiavnica Mountains	1009
5	Isten dombja Zala Hills	43,0	343,3	46°32′14″N 16°52′57″E	Petö-hegy; Kesztehely Mountains	355
6	Szilvási-kő; Bükk	38,5	960,7	48°04′16″N 20°26′05″E	Kékes; Mátra	1014
7	Szársomlyó; Villány Mountains	30,8	442,4	45°51′21″N 18°24′44″E	Misina; Mecsek	533
8	Nagy-Tenke; Zala Hills	29,1	331,6	46°34′00″N 16°30′12″E	Hahót-hegy; Zala Hills	333
9	Gerecse; Gerecse	27,9	633,2	47°40′50″N 18°29′09″E	Nagy-Szoplák; Pilis Mountains	710
10	Pilis-tető; Pilis Mountains	26,0	756,6	47°41′18″N 18°52′19″E	Nagy-Inóc; Börzsöny	826
11	Karancs; Karancs Hills	25,9	727,3	48°09′30″N 19°47′22″E	Ágasvár; Mátra	789
12	Nagy-Milic; Zemplén Mountains	25,1	892,8	48°34′36″N 21°27′29″E	Mošník; Slanské Hills	911
