= National Blue Trail =

Hiking trail in Hungary

The route of the National Blue Trail in Hungary

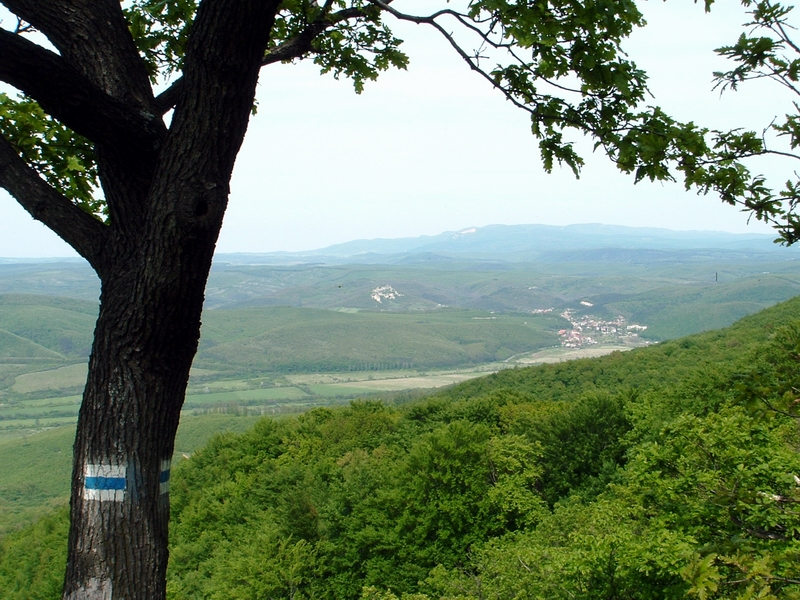
A standard blue trail marking with two faces on a tree at the ridge of the Mátra Mountains

The National Blue Trail (in Hungarian: Országos Kéktúra, short: OKT) is a national trail in Hungary, for most of its length part of the European Long Distance Walking Route E4. The route starts atop the Írott-kő Mountain (884 m) on the Austrian-Hungarian border then leads across Hungary eventually ending 1,172 km later at the village of Hollóháza by the Hungarian-Slovakian border. (Interactive map). The name of the Kéktúra (Blue Trail) is a reference to the marking of the path itself: it is a horizontal blue stripe on a white rectangle. All segments of the trail are freely accessible to the public; no fees have to be paid or permits obtained, there is only one ferry to take over the Danube between Visegrád and Nagymaros where you have to purchase a ticket. Although to have an official completion, you have to purchase a stamping brochure from MTSZ, the organizer of the trail.

Along its route, the Blue Trail passes a variety of notable natural and man-made sights of Hungary, including more than a dozen forts and castles, lookout towers, three World Heritage Sites of Hungary (the panorama of Budapest from the hills, the old village of Hollókő and the Stalactite Cave of Aggtelek), Lake Balaton, the Danube Bend, and the spent volcanoes of the Basin of Tapolca, etc.

According to the official website, as of March 2023 its total length is 1172.4 km and the total climb is 31 460 meters west to east. (Values vary as there are slight changes in the route every year.)

== History ==
=== Early history ===
The National Blue Trail (simply Blue Trail, or Tour) was the first long-distance walking route not only in Hungary but in Europe. Its path was first waymarked in 1938; its length was 910 km in that time between Írott-kő in the Kőszeg Mountains and Tolvaj-hegy in the Zemplén Mountains. A lot of Hungarian hikers began the completion of the Trail after World War II, so the Nature Rambler Section of the Lokomotív Sport Club of Budapest announced the National walk on the "blue" hiking path in 1952. In the 1950s the blue trail was extended with a detour to reach the vicinity of Budapest, which is the most popular section to this day.

The Nature Rambler Section's Committee of Railway Employee's Union developed this issue on the national level in 1953, and published the first brochure, which showed the whole route in map sketches.

Later, organisation and control of the National Blue Trail movement was taken over by the Hungarian Rambler's Association "Friends of Nature" (MTSZ) in 1961.

=== Popularity in the 1980s ===
But the Blue Trail was known only among hikers until the beginning of the 1980s, when Hungarian TV broadcast a series (Másfélmillió lépés Magyarországon, One and a Half Million Steps in Hungary) about the route of the Trail. The organiser and editor of this series was Pál Rockenbauer, who at that time worked in the editorial office named "Natura" of the Hungarian TV. Pál Rockenbauer organised a small team and they completed the National Blue Trail during 76 days in an east–west direction. They carried everything (cameras, films and other equipment) in their backpacks and undertook the whole project without any external help.

Their work was very successful: the series drew people's attention to the National Blue Trail. Everybody got to know the Trail in Hungary and many people began the completion of it. A lot of hikers have the series on video or DVD at home. Pál Rockenbauer committed suicide in 1987 during a hike on the paths of the Blue Trail close to village Katalinpuszta at the foot of the Naszály Mountain. A wooden headboard column cherishes his memory on that place beside the path of the National Blue Trail.

=== Sister blue trails ===
In 1989, the MTSZ launched the second blue trail commemorating Pál Rockenbauer, called the Rockenbauer Pál Dél-dunántúli Kéktúra (RPDDK, English: Rockenbauer Pál Southern Transdanubian Blue Trail). The 550 km long trail starts from the western endpoint of the OKT (Írott-kő) and spans to Szekszárd, covering the southern Transdanubian region including the Mecsek that is not covered by the OKT.

In 1996, another blue trail was launched, the Alföldi Kéktúra (AK, in English: Lowlands Blue Trail). The 870 kilometers long trail runs between the RPDDK endpoint Szekszárd and Sátoraljaújhely, almost reaching the eastern end of OKT crossing the mostly flat Great Hungarian Plain region.

The 3 official blue trails managed by MTSZ are called Országos Kék Kör (National Blue Circle). Hikers receive their badges by completing all 3 trails independently.

=== Revival in the 2010s ===
The OKT was in waning popularity in the early 1990s with fewer than 50 people completing it each year. But in the late 2000s it began to become popular again, and in 2012 the number of hikers surpassed the previous yearly record (202 in 2012 vs. 168 in 1966). Popularity continued to grow throughout the decade as the route was given a complete facelift with new signposts and waymarkers, on many sections it was rerouted for more convenient use. The MTSZ published a new brochure along with a new set of redesigned stamps, and many stamps were relocated for 0-24 hour availability. Due to marketing success and renewed interest in hiking (which was further catalyzed by the COVID-19 pandemic), the number of completions reached 500 for 2021 and 800 for 2022, making them the most popular years in the history of the Blue Trail.

== Certification of completion ==
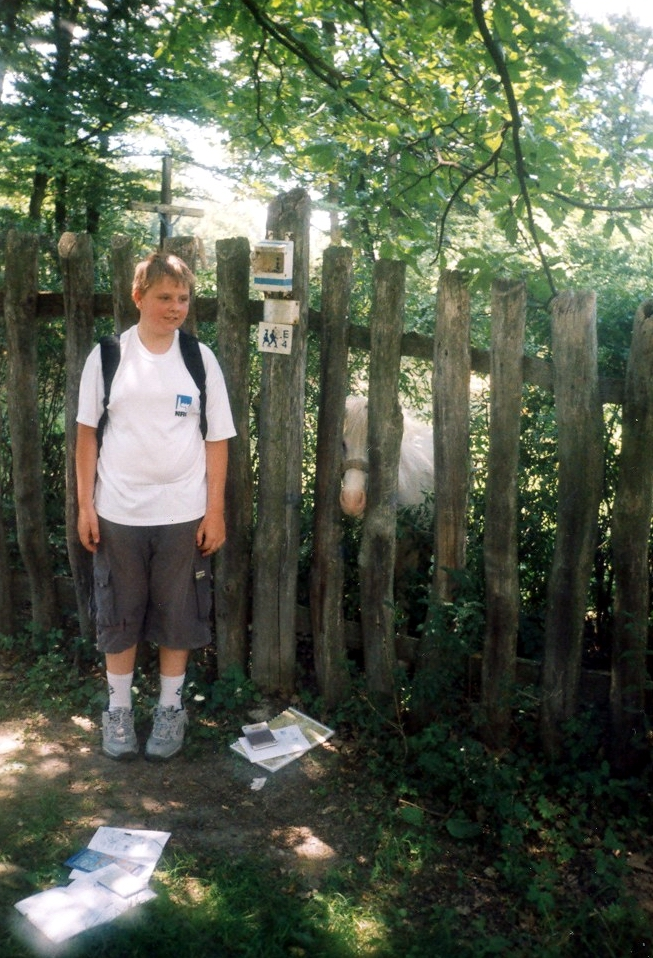
A stamping place at the fence of the forester's lodge of Pap-rét in the Pilis Mountains

The entire trail or its sections can be done without any official registration. However, the official completion of the Blue Trail requires stamping the certification booklet at checkpoints.

There are 150 checkpoints (stamping locations) on the route of the Blue Trail. Participants have to certify the completion of the tour by collecting all the stamps along the way and marking the completion date of each stretch between two stamps in the booklet.

The National Blue Trail has its own custom designed stamps with the name of the corresponding checkpoint. They are located along the route, usually at a distance of 5-10 kilometers. If they are not exactly on the route, a marked side path leads to the seal. Some checkpoints have more than one alternate stamps, for convenience and redundancy.

In case of missing or unavailable stamps, the hiker has two options:

- Find an unofficial stamp nearby that contains the name of the place or an address so it can be accepted as a local stamp. Stamps from train stations, post offices, town halls, local businesses like pubs or shops ar usually accepted.
- Photos are accepted if the stamp was not available and shows the place and person along with the date.

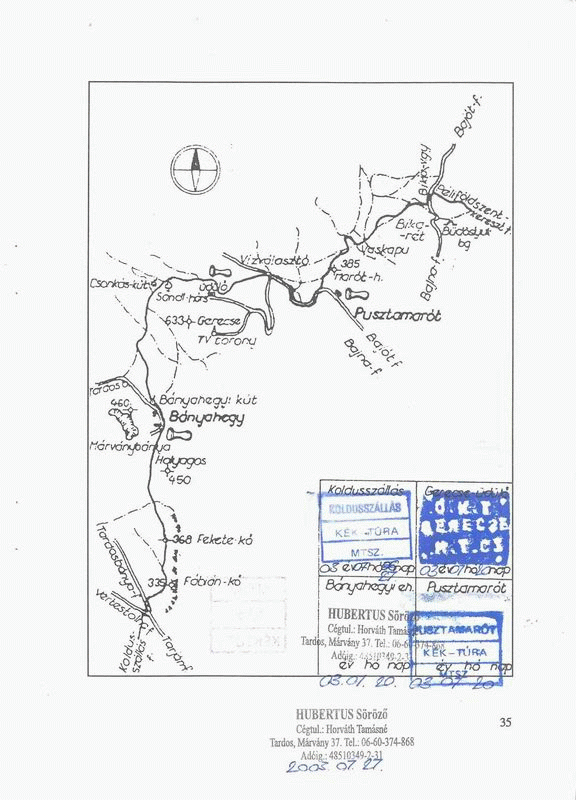
A sheet with stamps in a personal completion book of the Blue Trail with old series of stamps (Note: in the old brochures hikers needed to stamp twice when they continued from the same place on a different occasion, in new brochures only a second date is needed. The double stamp is not official, but a stamp of a local pub)

Usually, hikers have to start or end a trip at a checkpoint. There is no restriction on the starting point, the direction of the hike or the continuity of the entire route, the only requirement is that the hiker must walk all sections of the trail following the actual route. There is no time limit, usually there are only a few thru-hikers, for most hikers it takes years (sometimes decades) to complete the Blue Trail in various sections.

After completing the entire trail, the booklet must be sent to the Hungarian Ramblers' Association (MTSZ) in Budapest for verification, after which the official certificate and commemorative badge are issued.

== Awards for completion ==
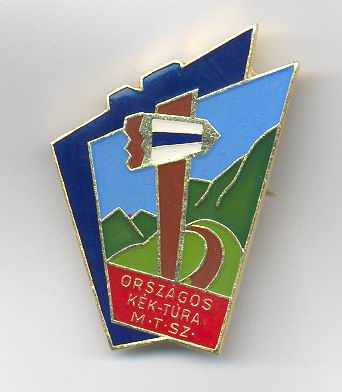
The badge of the National Blue Trail

Anyone who completes the Blue Trail is eligible for the Blue Trail Badge of MTSZ. The badge is an irregular quadrangle with a road leading towards mountains with a blue signed post and below in red stripe with the following: "Országos Kék-túra MTSZ". MTSZ prepares and hands over the badge—if it is possible—during a small ceremony. A record of those who have completed the trail is also kept by the Association.

The number of people who have completed the Trail is more than 4100 in year 2007. It is also possible to complete the Trail more than once.

There are three sections on the route of the Blue Trail which have their own badges. These can be obtained without completing the whole Trail; however, by completing the Trail one is also eligible for these.

- Dorogtól Nógrádig túramozgalom (Hikers' Movement between Dorog and Nógrád) through the Pilis Mountains, Buda Mountains and Börzsöny Mountains – 138.8 km, 4490 m total climb.
- Mátra-Bükk útjain túramozgalom (Hikers' Movement through the paths of the Mátra and Bükk Mountains) – 120.0 km, 4360 m total climb
- Veszprém megyei kéktúra túramozgalom (Veszprém County Blue Trail Hikers' Movement) between Sümeg and Bodajk through the Balaton Uplands and the Bakony Mountains – 247.8 km, 5360 m total climb
The badge of Hikers' Movement between Dorog and Nógrád

The badge of Hikers' Movement through the paths of the Mátra and Bükk Mountains

The badge of Veszprém County Blue Trail Hikers' Movement

The badge of the Children's Blue Trail

The Children's Blue Trail (GYKT) can be completed by children between the age of 6 and 14 hiking 300 km on the Blue Trail. It is divided into nine regions:

- Kőszeg Mountains – Little Hungarian Plain
- Balaton Uplands
- Bakony
- Vértes – Gerecse
- Pilis – Buda Mountains
- Börzsöny – Cserhát
- Mátra
- Bükk – Aggtelek
- Cserehát – Zemplén

Children who complete at least 50 km distance in a region obtain the regional badge of Children's Blue Trail (GYKT); at most one badge can be earned in each region independently of the distance covered. If the combined length of the completed sections reaches 300 km, they obtain the GYKT badge. In case of organising and leading a group of children, the leader can obtain the badge, if the number of the children is at least 6.

Completion of GYKT counts towards gaining the OKT badge as well. The validation of the completion is the same as in the OKT.

== Detailed route description ==
=== Kőszeg Mountains and Small Plain ===
142,1 km, 710-metre climb

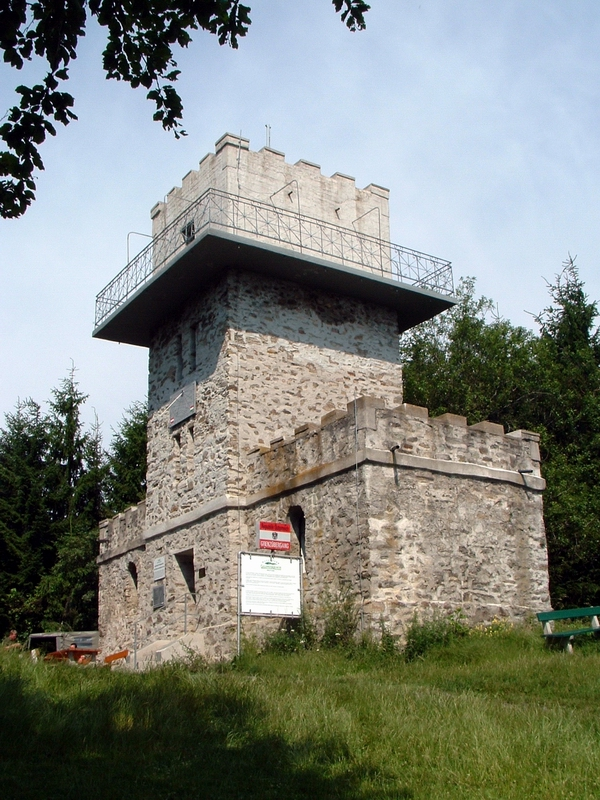
Lookout tower on the top of Irottkő - here starts the 1128 km long route of the National Blue Trail

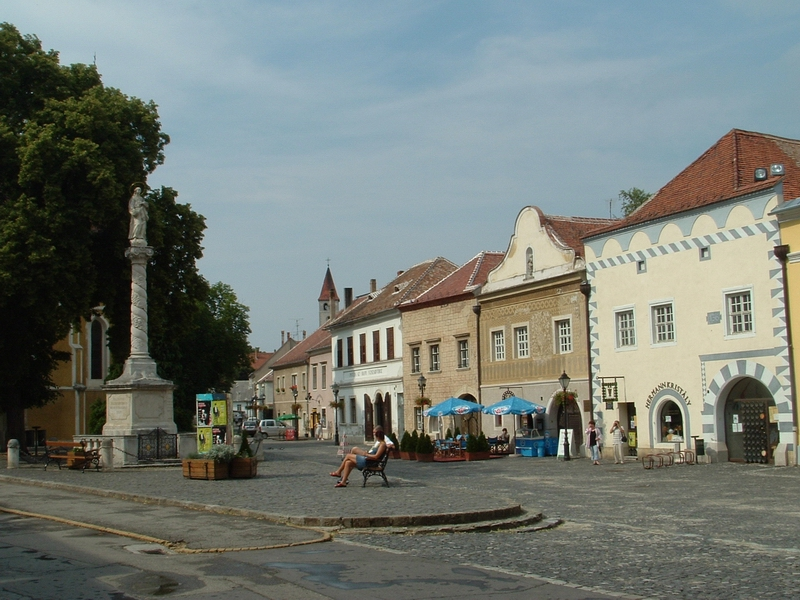
The main square of town Kőszeg

The route of the Blue Trail begins on the top of the Írott-kő Mountain (884 m) at the feet of the lookout tower on the Austrian-Hungarian border and leads among the mountains of the Kőszegi-hegység (Kőszeg Mountains) until the town of Kőszeg. It passes by the Hétvezér-forrás (Spring of the Seven Leaders), the lookout tower of Óház-tető and the Calvary Church of Kőszeg. After Kőszeg, the Blue Trail reaches the wide plains of Rába River. The route of the Trail crosses the Little Hungarian Plain in northwest-southeastern direction via Sárvár – where the route crosses the Rába River – until Sümeg. The total climb on the 120 km long plain section is only 460 metres.

Stamping places

Lookout Tower of Írottkő, Hétvezér-forrás (Spring of Seven Leaders), Kőszeg, Tömörd, Ablánci Malomcsárda (Water Mill Tavern of Ablánc), Szeleste, Bögöt, Csényeújmajor, Sárvár railway station, Gérce, forester's lodge of Rózsáskert, hunter's lodge of Hidegkút, village Káld, village Hosszúpereszteg, forester's lodge of Szajk at Lakes of Szajk, Ötvös railway station, Kisvásárhely, Sümeg railway station

=== Balaton Highlands ===
129.9 km, 2,870-metre climb

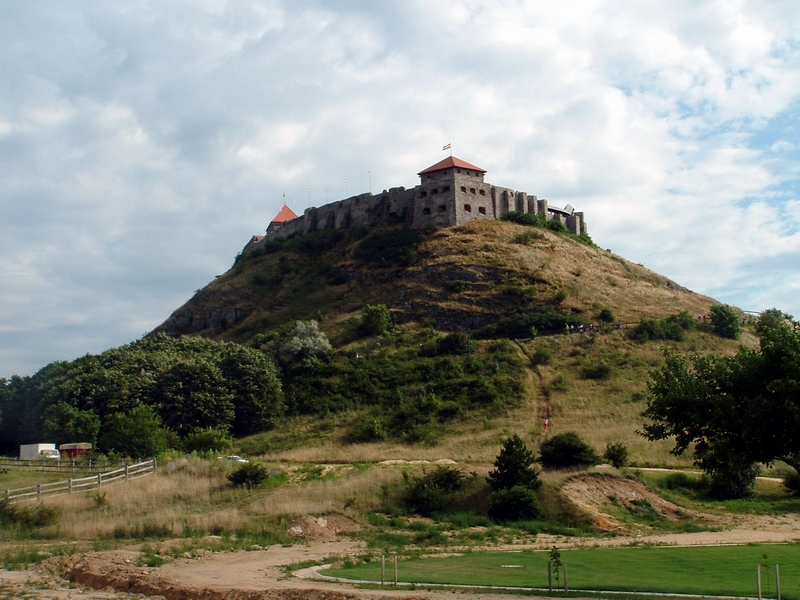
The Castle of Sümeg

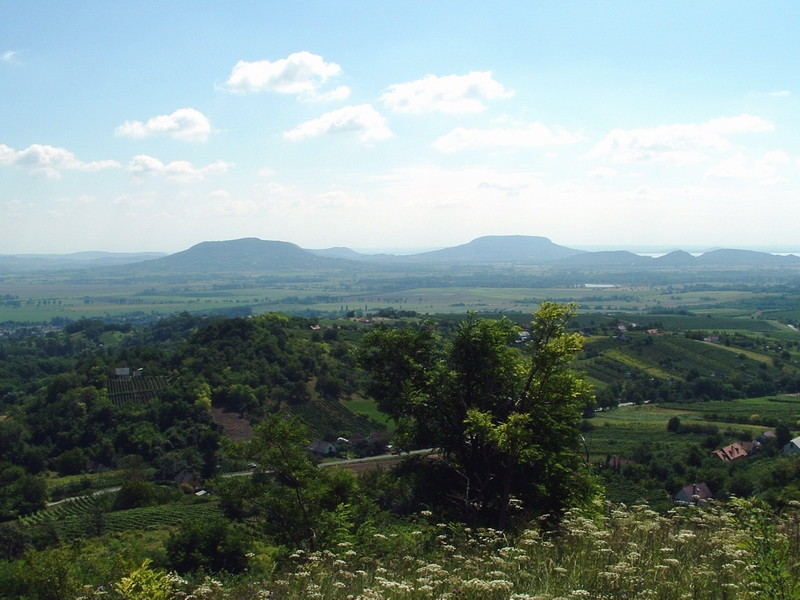
The Tapolca Basin with the extinct volcanoes

At the town of Sümeg the Blue Trail reaches the edge of the plain and the route goes on among the 200–300 metres tall hills of the Balaton Highlands. The path visits the castle ruins of Tátika and the Buddhist Stupa at village of Zalaszántó. Later the path reaches the old, extinct volcanoes at the coast of Lake Balaton. Among others the route visits Szent György-hegy (415 m), the Badacsony (437 m), Gulács (393 m) and the Csobánc (376 m). The tops of the extinct volcanoes rise 250–300 meters above the Káli Basin. After the basin the Blue Trail goes among the hills of the highlands until it reaches Nagyvázsony.

Stamping places

Sümeg railway station, forester's lodge of Sarvaly, Zalaszántó, Rezi, Gyöngyösi csárda (Tavern of Gyöngyös), Hévíz bus terminal, railway station of Keszthely, Vállus, Lesenceistvánd, Tapolca railway station, Tourist Hostel of Szent György-hegy, Szigliget Castle, Badacsonytördemic railway station, Káptalantóti, Mindszentkálla, Szentbékkálla, Balatonhenye, tourist shelter of Csicsó, Nagyvázsony.

=== Bakony Mountains ===
117.9 km, 2,490-metre climb

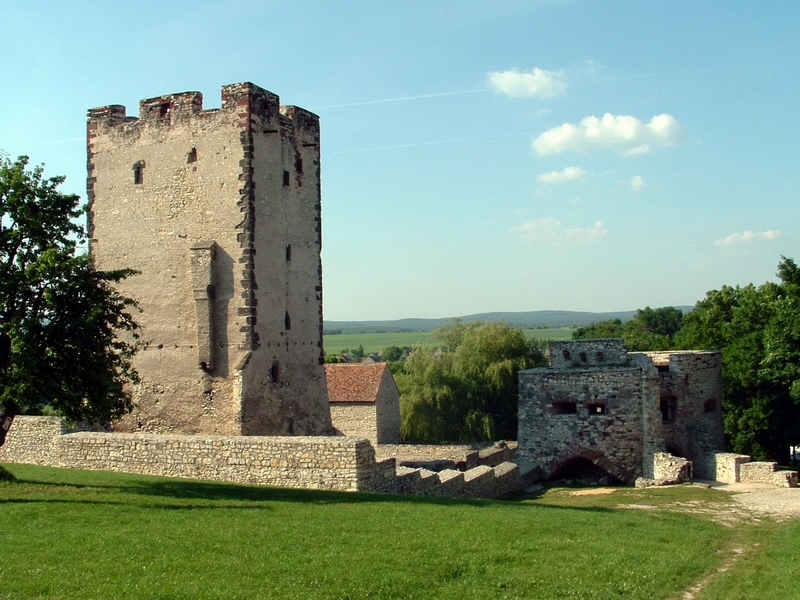
The Castle of Vázsonykő in village Nagyvázsony

Departing from Nagyvázsony the route reaches the Bakony (Bakony Mountains), which is the first member in the long row of medium mountains in Hungary. First the Blue Trail climbs to the top of Kab-hegy (599 m) and descends to the valley to the railway station of Városlőd-Kislőd. After Bakonybél the Trail visits the tallest peak of Bakony, Kőris-hegy (700 m). After Zirc the route of the Blue Trail leads among the hills of the Eastern Bakony. This area is the oldest of Hungarian medium mountains, it has only mild hills and valleys.

Stamping places

Nagyvázsony, forester's lodge of Kab-hegy, Úrkút, Városlőd-Kislőd railway station, Németbánya, Bakonybél, peak of Kőris Mountain, Borzavár, Zirc railway station, Bakonynána, Jásd, Tés, Kisgyón, Bakonykúti, Fehérvárcsurgó, Bodajk

=== Vértes Mountains and Gerecse Hills ===
115.7 km, 3,110-metre climb

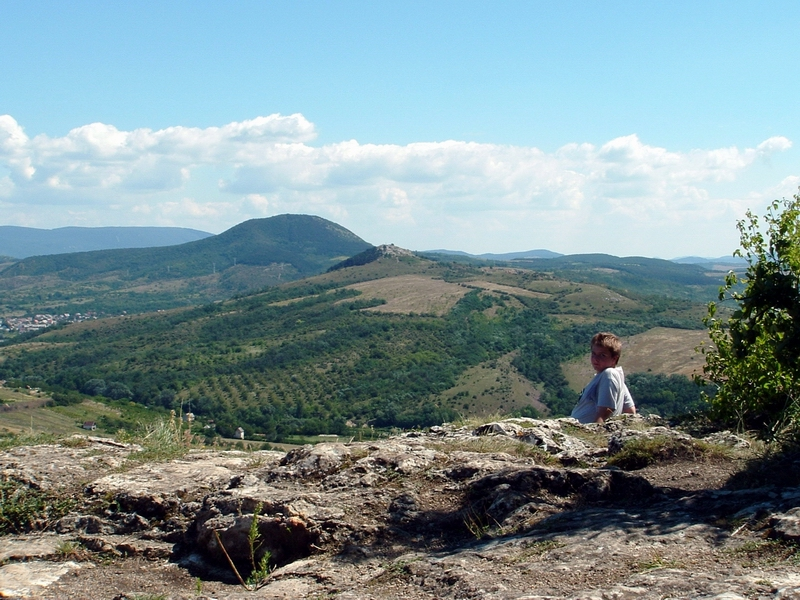
Among the Gerecse Hills

The route of the Blue Trail goes through the forest of the about 400 meters high volcanic plateau of the Vértes and reaches the Gerecse Hills. From the tops of the last hills of this region opens a view towards the Danube and Slovakia.

Stamping places

Bodajk, Csókakő, Gánt, Mindszentpuszta homestead, Kőhányáspuszta, Castle of Gesztes, Szárliget railway station, tourist shelter of Somlyóvár, hunter's lodge of Koldusszállás, ruins of the forester's lodge of Bányahegy, children's holiday resort on the Gerecse Mountain, Pusztamarót homestead, pilgrimage place Péliföldszentkereszt, Mogyorósbánya, Tokod, Dorog railway station.

=== Pilis Mountains and Mountains of Buda ===
100.7 km, 2,880-metre climb

The view of Budapest from the hills	Walking path in the Gorge of Pilis	The Castle of Visegrád

The Pilis Mountains lie in the big bend of the Danube, where it turns towards southern direction from the earlier western-eastern direction. The route of the Blue Trail is similar to a big, inverse "Ω" letter here; the Trail first goes in southern direction until the area of Budapest, only touching the forests of the capital (Mountains of Buda). Not much later the path returns to the Pilis Mountains and reaches the Danube at the Danube Bend at Visegrád, a popular tourist destination known for its castle atop the hill.

Stamping places

Dorog railway station, Klastrompuszta, Piliscsaba railway station, a pub named Muflon Itató on the Zsíroshegy, Hüvösvölgy Children's Railway Station, peak of Hármashatár-hegy, Virágos-nyereg (Virágos Col), Rozália Brickyard, Kevély-nyereg (Col of Kevély), Pilisszentkereszt, the peak of Dobogókő (700 m), forester's lodge of Sikáros, Pilisszentlászló, forester's lodge of Pap-rét, peak of Nagy-Villám, ticket office of the ferry in village Visegrád

=== Börzsöny Mountains and Hilly Country of Cserhát ===
157.1 km, 4,890-metre climb

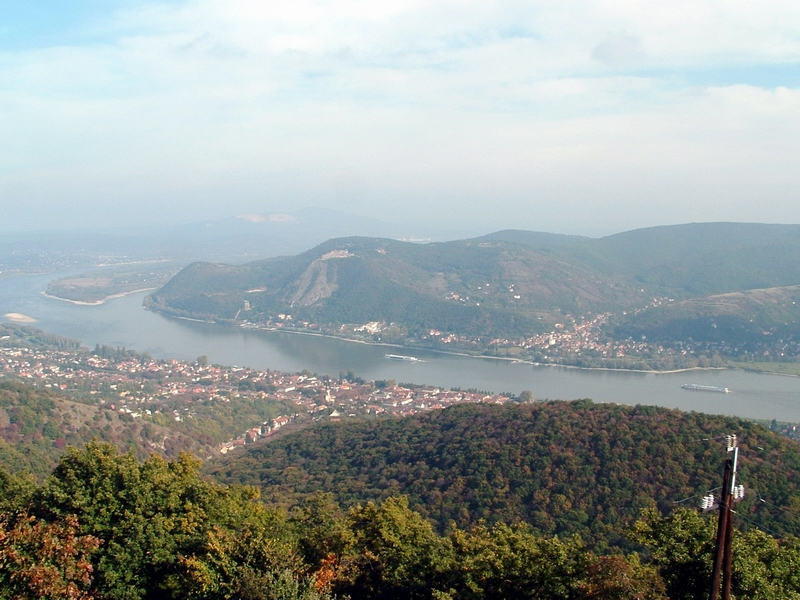
The view of the eastern part of the Danube Bend

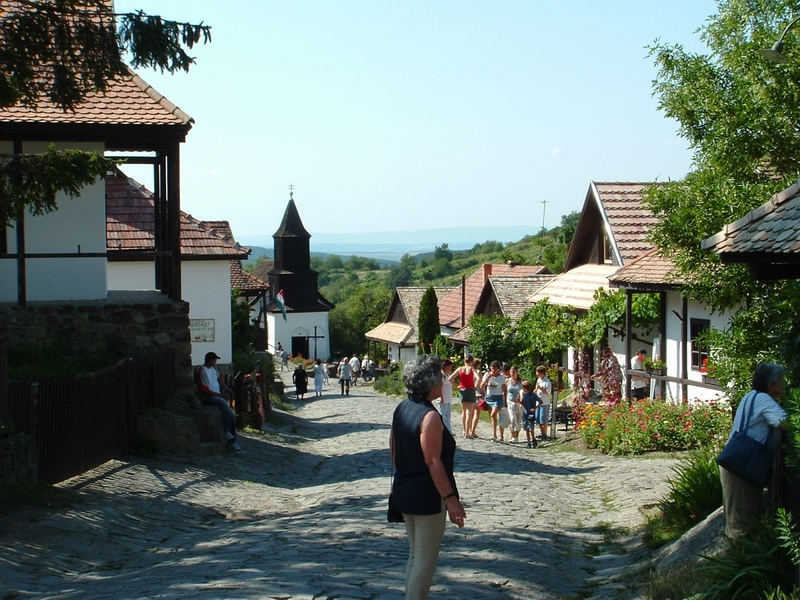
The main street of village Hollókő

The Blue Trail goes further on the left coast of the Danube and climbs the peaks of the Börzsöny (Nagy-Hideg-hegy: 864 m and Csóványos: 938 m) and after the peak of Naszály (652 m) it reaches the Cserhát Hills. Hollókő, a World Heritage Site, lies among the hills and on the Trail. After the peak of Tepke (566 m) the route reaches the Mátra Mountains.

Stamping places

Nagymaros railway station, Tourist Hostel of Törökmező, Tourist Hostel of Kisinóc, Tourist Hostel of Nagy-Hideg-hegy (864 m), Nógrád railway station, Magyarkút, Katalinpuszta, Ősagárd, Felsőpetény, Alsópetény, Romhány, Kétbodony, Becske, Szandaváralja, Cserhátsurány, Nógrádsipek, Hollókő, Nagymező-puszta homestead, Nagybárkány, Mátraverebély.

=== Mátra Mountains ===
65.1 km, 2,480-metre climb

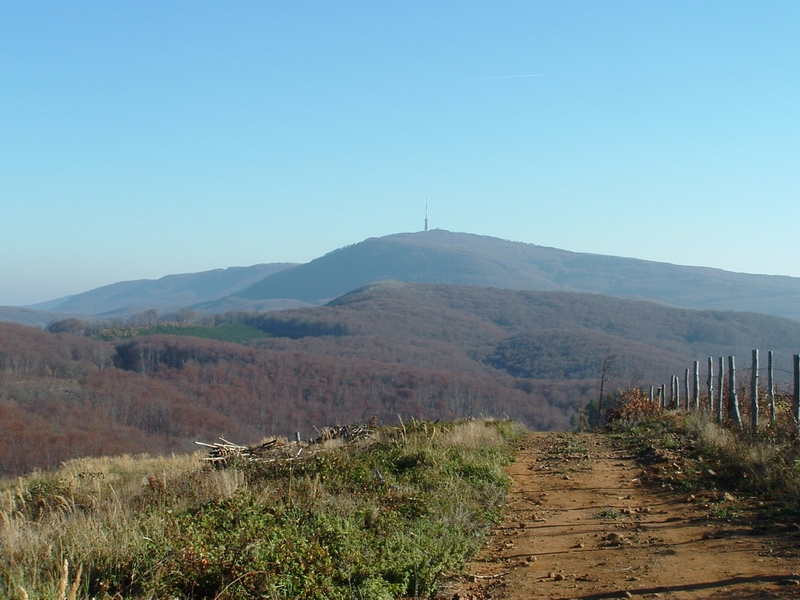
The tallest Hungarian mountain is the Kékestető - 1014 m

Mátra is the highest mountain range in Hungary; the Blue Trail climbs the two highest peaks: the Galyatető (964 m) and the Kékestető (1014 m) – the latter being the highest peak of Hungary. After the peaks the Trail descends on the long eastern ridge of the mountains to Sirok and later to Szarvaskő.

Stamping places

Mátraverebély, Tourist Hostel of Ágasvár, Mátraszentistván, the peak of Galyatető, forester's lodge of Nyírjes, Vörösmarty Tourist Hostel, Mátraháza, the peak of Kékestető, forester's lodge of Hármashatár, Sirok railway station, Restaurant Hunor in Sirok, forester's lodge of Rozsnakpuszta, Szarvaskő

=== Bükk Mountains and Aggtelek Hills ===
116.6 km, 3,150-metre climb

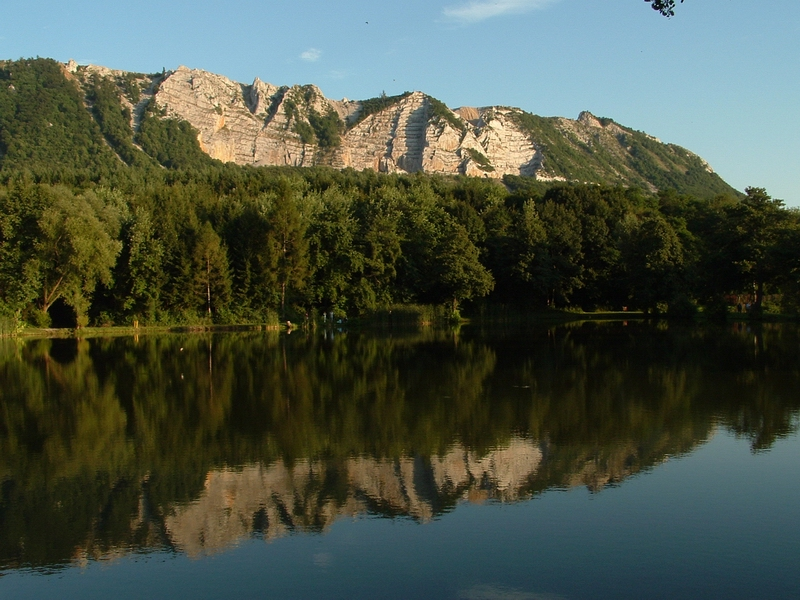
At the feet of the Bükk Mountains

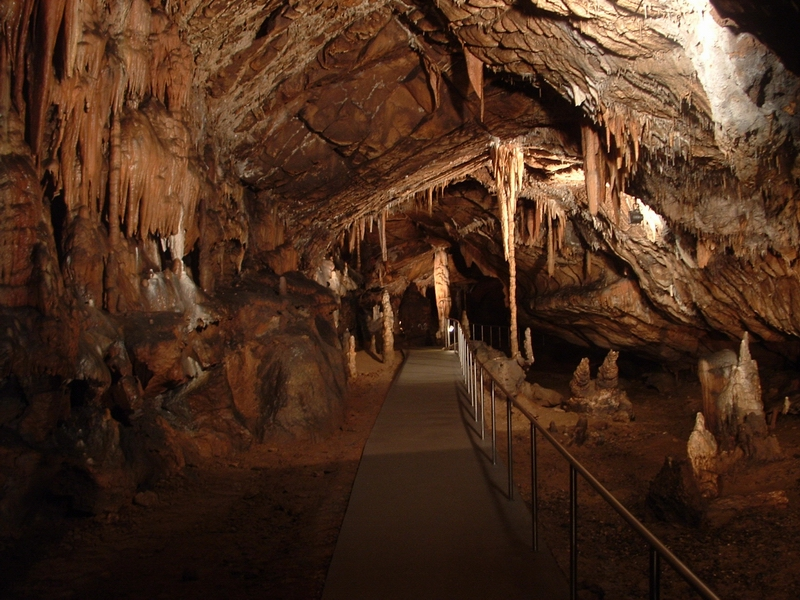
In the Stalactite Cave of Aggtelek

The path climbs the 800–900 metres high plateau of the Bükk Mountains, then it descends into the valley of Sajó River. Later on the National Blue Trail visits the stalactite cave of Aggtelek, a World Heritage Site, in the Aggtelek Karst and then reaches the valley of the Bódva River.

Stamping places

Szarvaskő, Telekessy Guesthouse, Bélapátfalva, Cserepes-kő Cave Shelter, Bánkút Ski House, Mályinka, Uppony, Putnok railway station, Kelemér, Gömörszőlős, Zádorfalva, Aggtelek, Jósvafő, ruins of Derenk, ruins of Szabó-pallag forester's lodge, Bódvaszilas railway station.

=== Cserehát Hills and Mountains of Zemplén ===
160.8 km, 3,550-metre climb

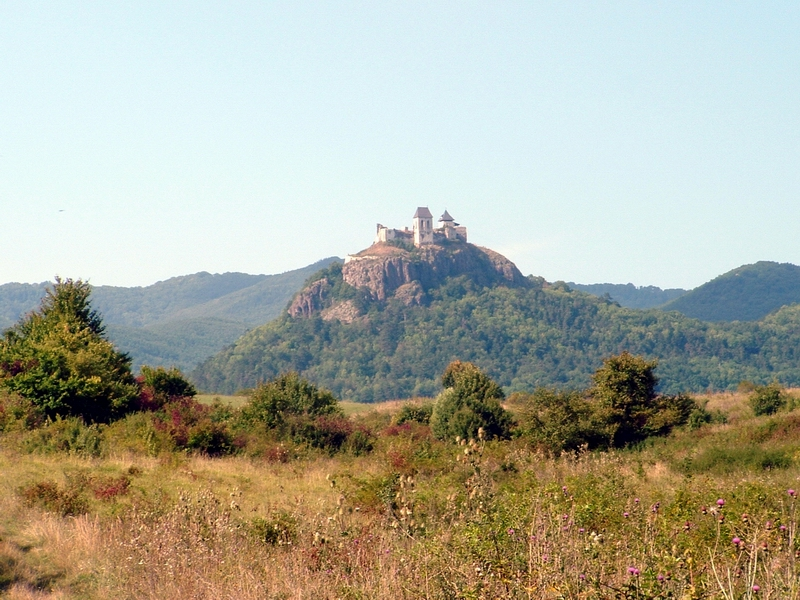
The Castle of Füzér

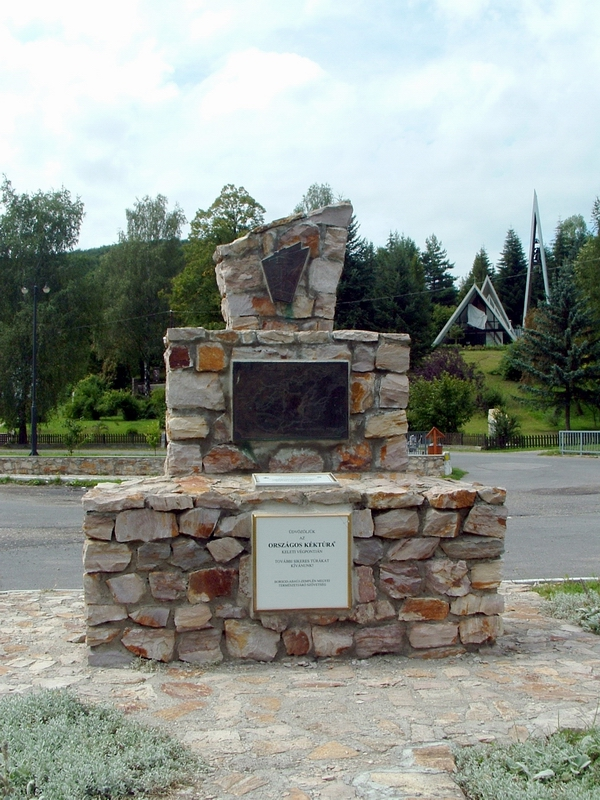
The monument of the Blue Trail at its end in Hollóháza

The route of the Blue Trail crosses the Cserehát Hills and reaches the last segment of the North Hungarian Mountains, the Zemplén Mountains. After crossing the hills from west to east, the path takes a sharp northwesterly turn near Sátoraljaújhely and finally climbs the highest peak of the mountains: the Nagy-Milic (895 m) which stands on the Hungarian-Slovakian border. Finally it descends to the village of Hollóháza. The final point of the National Blue Trail, which is marked with a small monument, is located here.

Stamping places

Bódvaszilas railway station, Tornabarakony, Rakacaszend, Felsővadász, Abaújszolnok, Baktakék, Fancsal, Encs, Gibárt Hydroelectric Power Station, Hernádcéce, Boldogkőváralja Railway Station, Mogyoróska, Regéc, Istvánkút hunter's lodge of, Eszkála hunter's lodge, Makkoshotyka, Cirkáló-tanya farmstead, Nagy-Nyugodó, Vágáshuta, Nagyhuta, Nagybózsva, Füzér, Bodó-rét, Hollóháza

== See also ==
- European long-distance paths
