= Csóványos =

Mountain in the North Hungarian Mountains

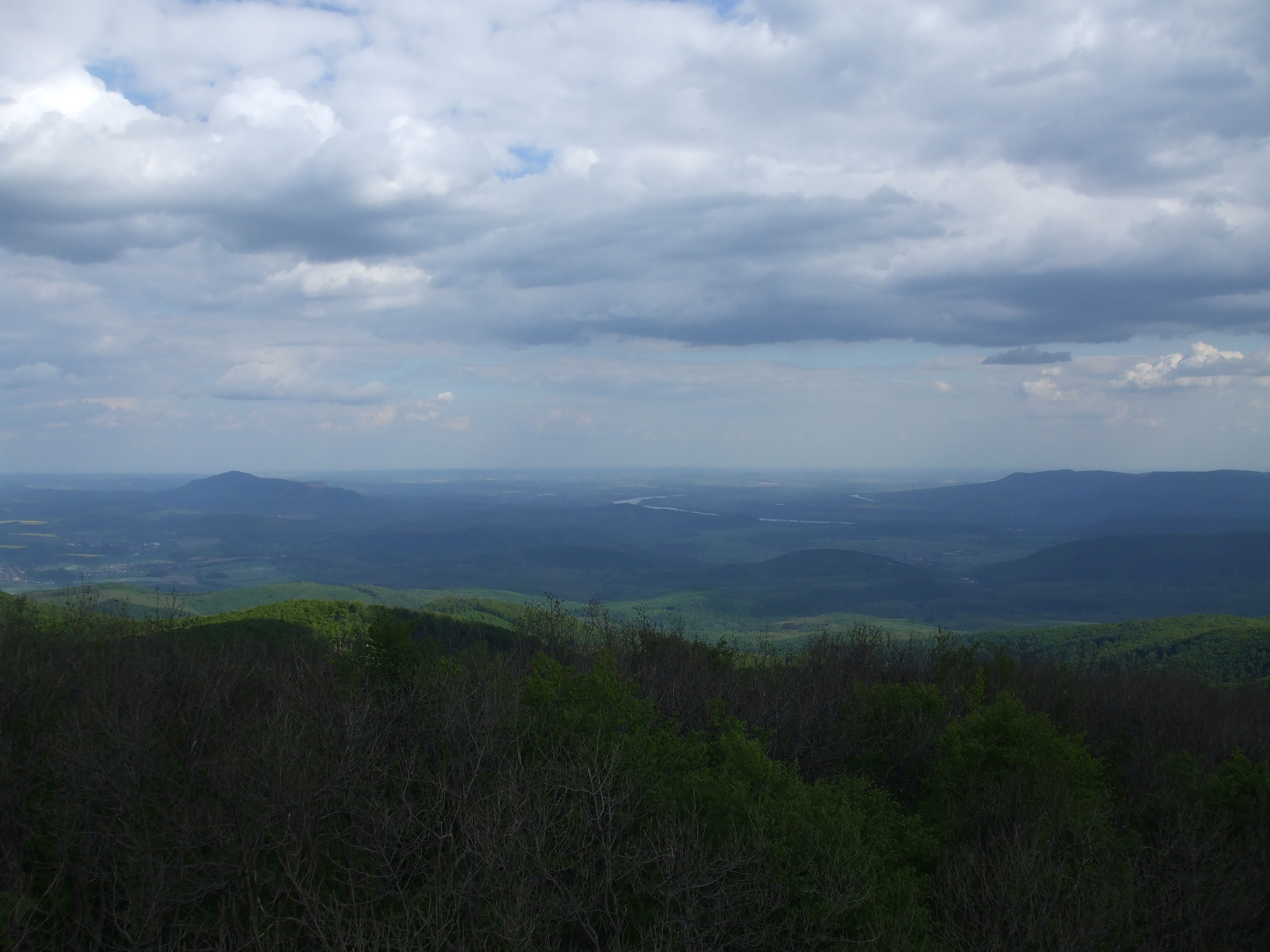

Highest point
- Elevation: 938 m (3,077 ft)
- Coordinates: 47°56′56″N 18°56′54″E

Geography
- Location within Hungary
- Location: Hungary
- Parent range: Börzsöny, North Hungarian Mountains

Csóványos (Hungarian: [ˈt͡ʃoːvaːɲoʃ]) is a mountain in the Börzsöny range of the North Hungarian Mountains. It has an altitude of 938 metres and spans the border of Nógrád County and Pest County. This area was geologically active in the Miocene era, 18 to 19 million years ago. In the Quaternary, when volcanic activity commenced, the immediate environment of Csóványos emerged. These movements created water features, high above the forests. The forest on the mountain is dense with blue beech and Austrian oak.

== Geography ==
The mountain lies within the Ipoly River Basin, which is a transboundary river between Slovakia and Hungary with the middle and lower basin lying in Hungarian territory. The Hungarian territory of the basin covers an area of 1,521 km^{2} (587 sq mi) formed by the hills of Nograd, Cserhat and Borzsony; Borzsony includes the Csóványos The Csóványos mountain peak as part of the Börzsöny Mountain ranges, lie in the Danube-Ipoly National Park in northern Hungary; the park is one of ten Hungarian national parks set up to "protect forested hills as well as riparian and lowland habitats."

== Flora ==
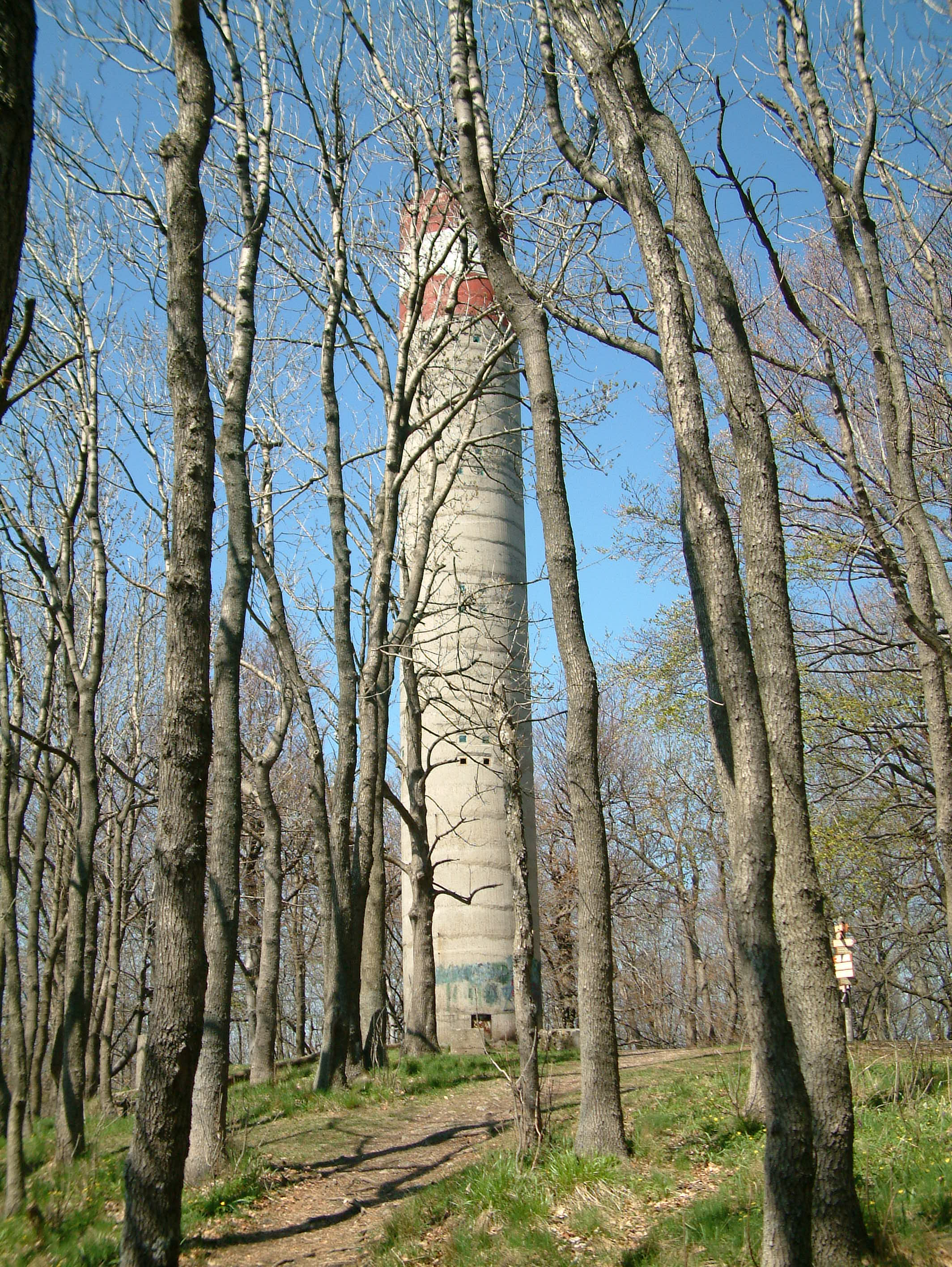
Lookout tower

The nearby alder forest of Drégelypalánk and the red pine forest of Diósjenő have been described as "almost mystic". Common wildlife found in this area are over 100 protected species of birds, pheasants, rabbits and deer. The plant life is equally rich in the region turning lush green in spring season. Blasia pusilla and Anthoceros laevis have been recorded in this region of Hungary.

== Trails ==
In the mid-1960s, the railway was developed in the area as well as mountain bike trails. It has since become a popular hiking and biking route. A 28 metre high building tower (a geodetic station reconstructed in 2014 and turned into a modern wooden watchtower) near the Peace Monument was built in 1973 and offers panoramic views of the countryside.

== Popular culture ==
A poetry book A Csóványos északi oldala by Győrffy Ákos about this mountain was published in 2000, and won the Hungarian Writers' Association Gérecz Attila Prize.

The Hungarian film Twilight (1990) uses this mountain in the opening and closing shots of the film.
