= Galya-tető =

Mountain in Hungary

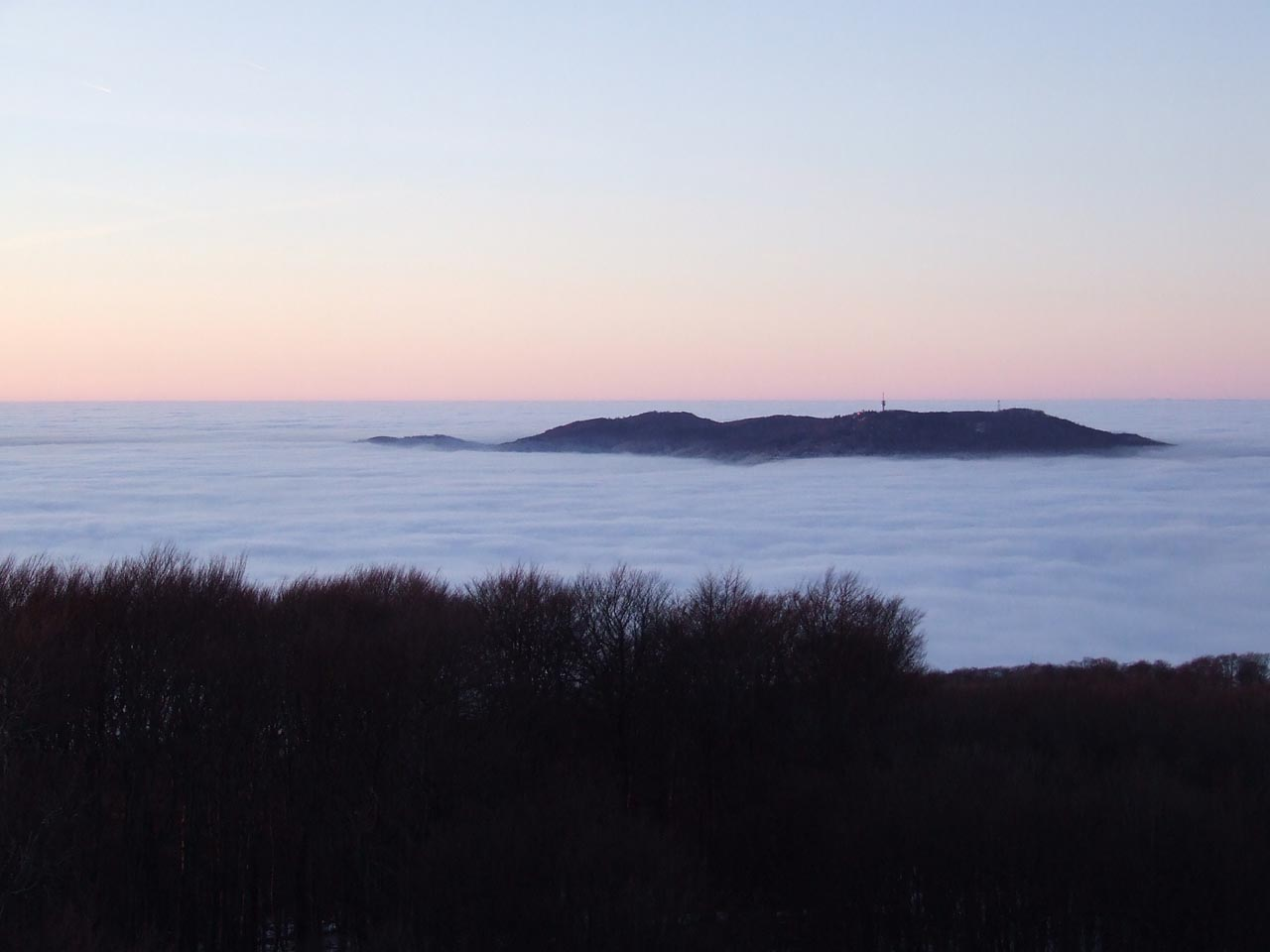
- Galya-tető from the Kékes

Highest point
- Elevation: 965 m (3,166 ft)
- Prominence: 349 m (1,145 ft)
- Coordinates: 47°55′N 19°54′E

Naming
- English translation: Treeless top
- Language of name: Hungarian

Geography
- Location within Hungary
- Parent range: Mátra, Western Carpathians

Galya-tető [ˈɡɒjɒtɛtøː] (Slovak: Matranská hoľa) is the second highest mountain (altitude: 965 m) in Hungary and in the Mátra mountain range (after Kékes). Galya-tető is a resort place of the village of Mátraszentimre in Heves County. The territory of Galyatető have an own postal code: 3234. It is 5.0 km away from the town center. As of 2022 census, it has a population of 43. The resort place reachable by bus from the capital city.

== History ==
The Mátra Association established a hostel here in 1894 and an andesite watchtower was erected on the Péter-hegyese mountain to the east of the Galya-tető in 1934. The hostel ruined and a new luxury hotel was built under the Péter-hegyese watchtower in 1939. The Church of Patrona Hungariae built on the Galya-tető in 1941. Galya-tető was annexed to Mátraszentimre in 1948. The importance of tourism increased in the 1960s and hotels and ski slopes were built here. The observatory was built on the Piszkés-tető mountain in 1960, what is west from Galya-tető and has been open to visitors since 2013. However the ski slopes are unusable already, but the watchtower renewed in 2015 and a new hostel was established. The new hostel is the stamping place of the National Blue Trail.

== Gallery ==
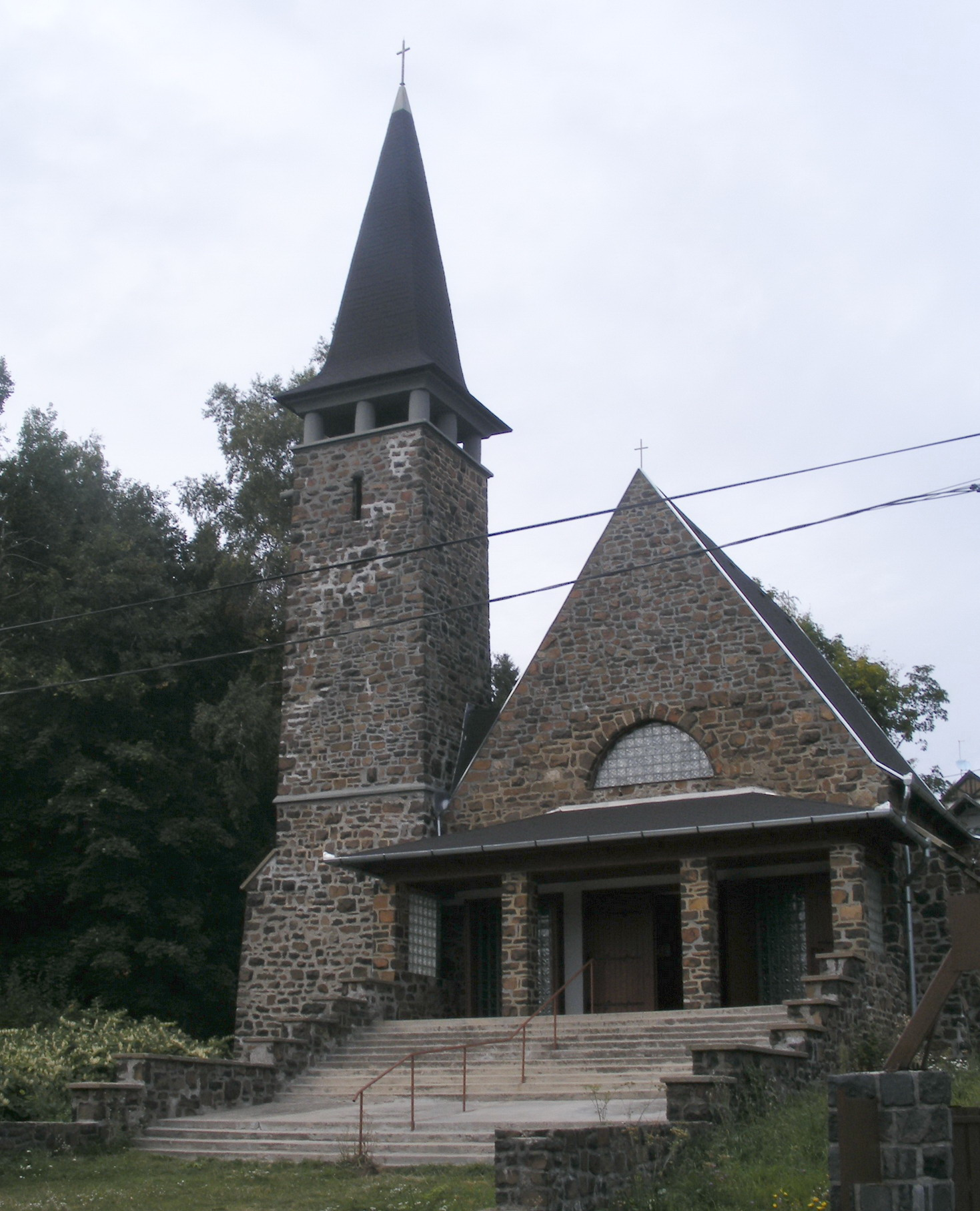
Patrona Hungariae Church

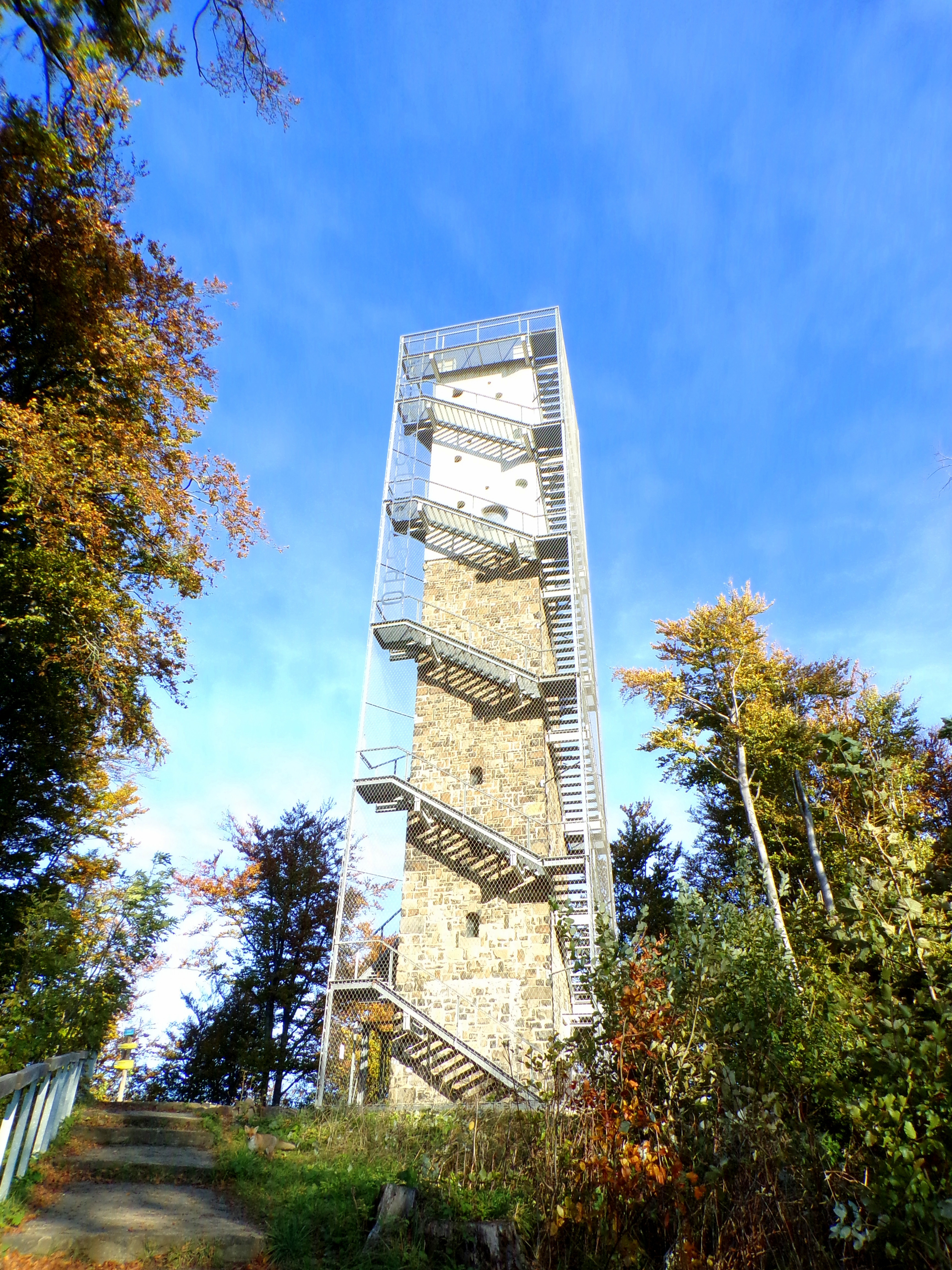
Péter hegyese watchtower
