= Börzsöny =

Mountain range in Northern Hungary

Coordinates: 47°55′N 19°00′E

Börzsöny (pronounced [ˈbørʒøɲ]; Slovak: Brežany or Novohradské hory, New City Mountains) is a mountain range in Northern Hungary. Its tallest peak is the Csóványos with 938 m (3,077 ft).

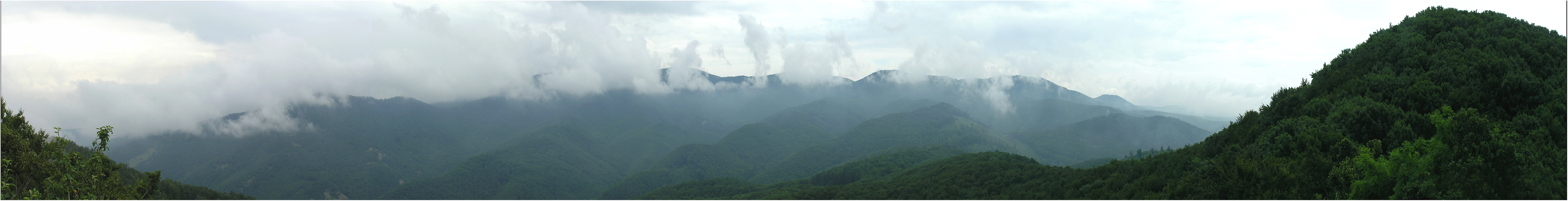
Börzsöny landscape

It is the westernmost member of the North Hungarian Mountains, which belongs to the Inner Western Carpathians. The varied landscape offers good hiking opportunities. A large part of the Börzsöny is a national park. From the top of Csóványos, it is possible to see one of the country's most beautiful panoramas on the Danube Bend (Dunakanyar).

== Geography ==
The mountain is structurally divided into four parts: High Börzsöny, Northern Börzsöny, Western Börzsöny and Southern Börzsöny.

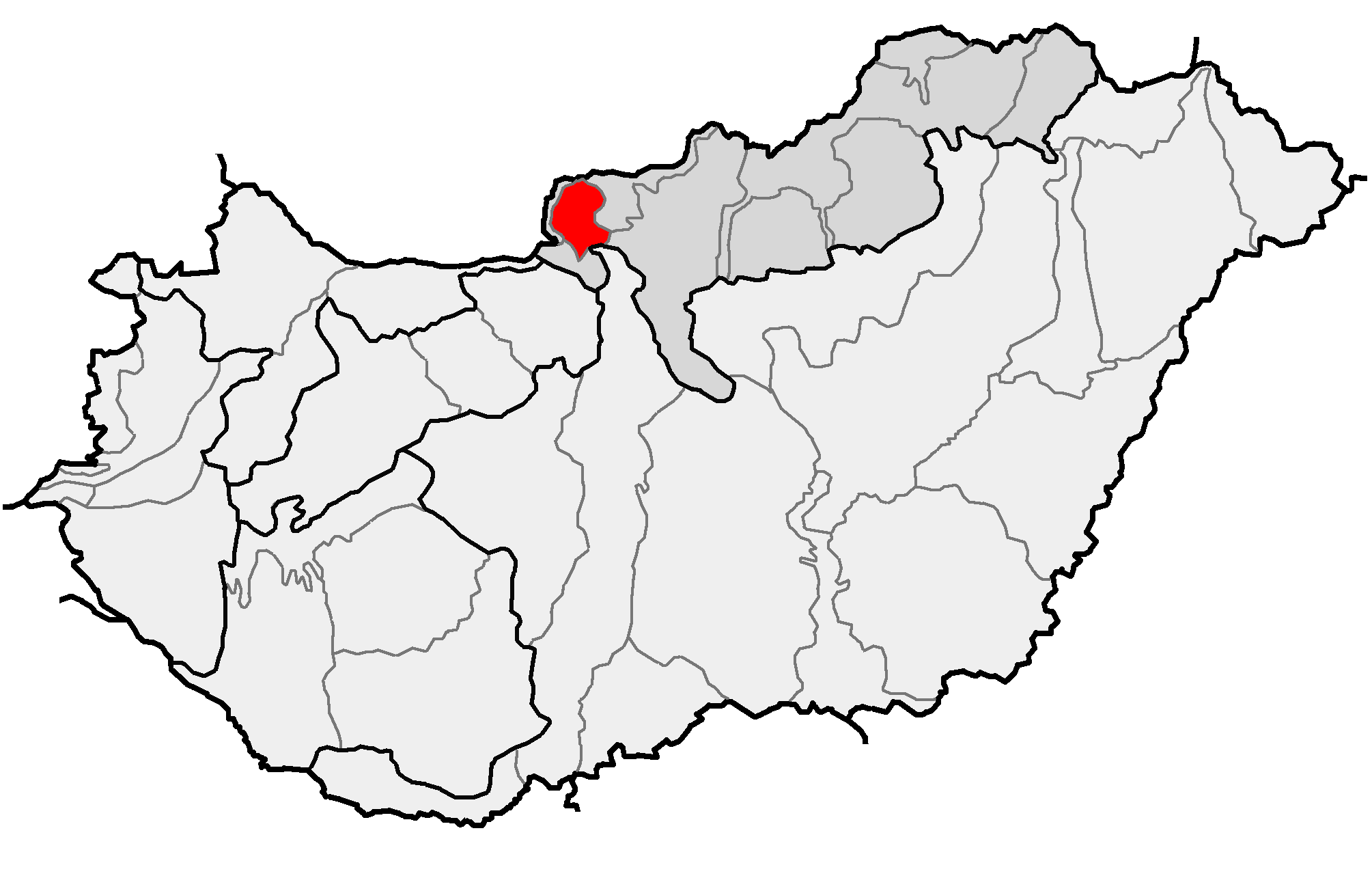
Location of Börzsöny (red) within physical subdivisions of Hungary

=== High Börzsöny ===
Here are the highest peaks of Börzsöny: the Csóványos (938 m), Magos-fa (916 m), Nagy-hideg Hill (864 m) and Nagy-Inóc (826 m).

== Hydrography ==
There are about 470 creeks in Börzsöny. The major parts of the creeks are clean water. The mountain's longest and largest river is the Kemence Stream.

== Wildlife ==
A large part of the Börzsöny is covered with oak and beech. The mountains still have 16 registered species of mammals. The 117 species of birds occur each year in the mountains, of whom 90 are regularly seen. The best-known songbirds are the nightingale, the thrush and the skylark. Among the amphibians, the most spectacular is the spotted salamander; among the reptiles is the angry snake.

== Gallery ==
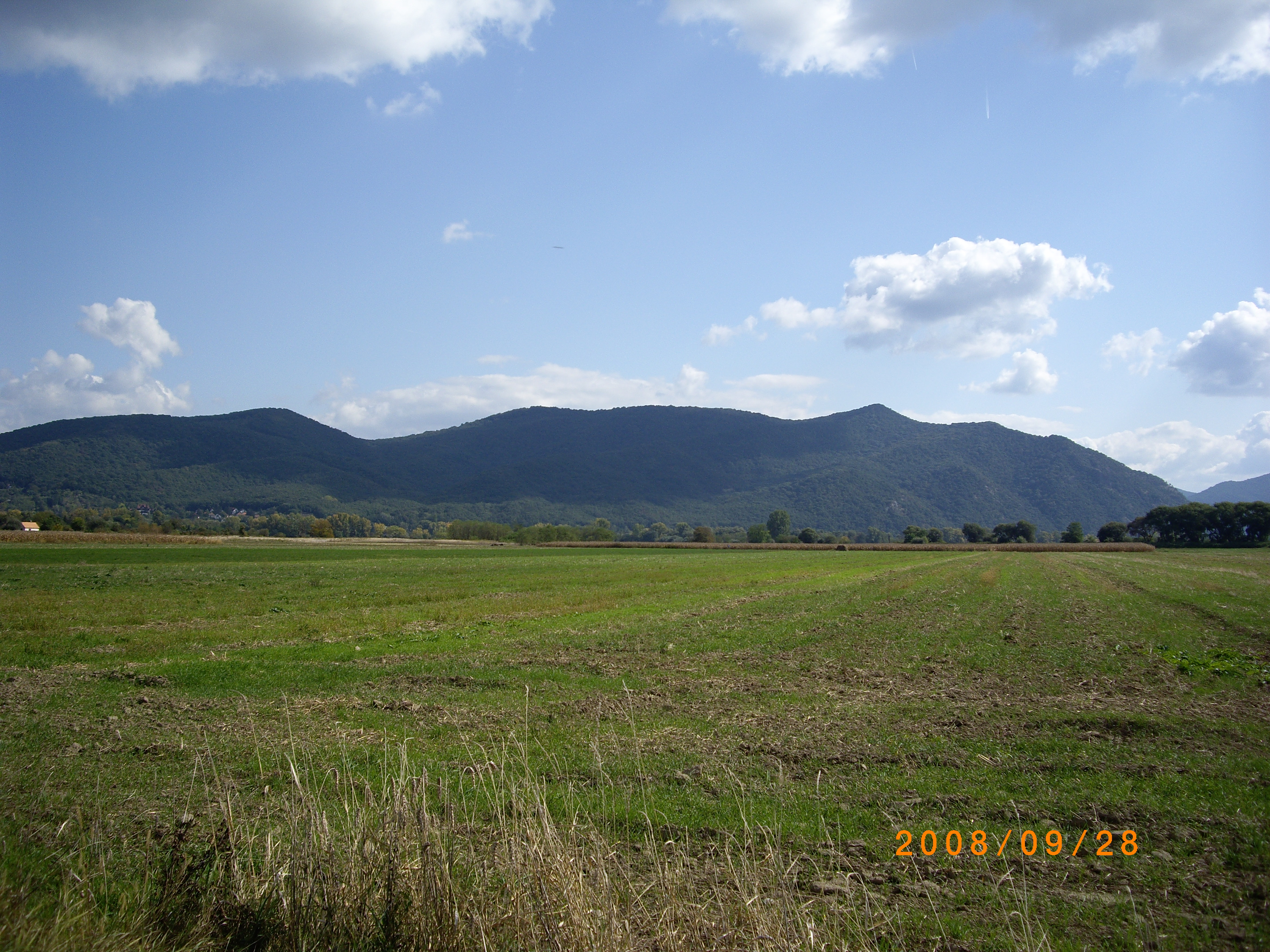

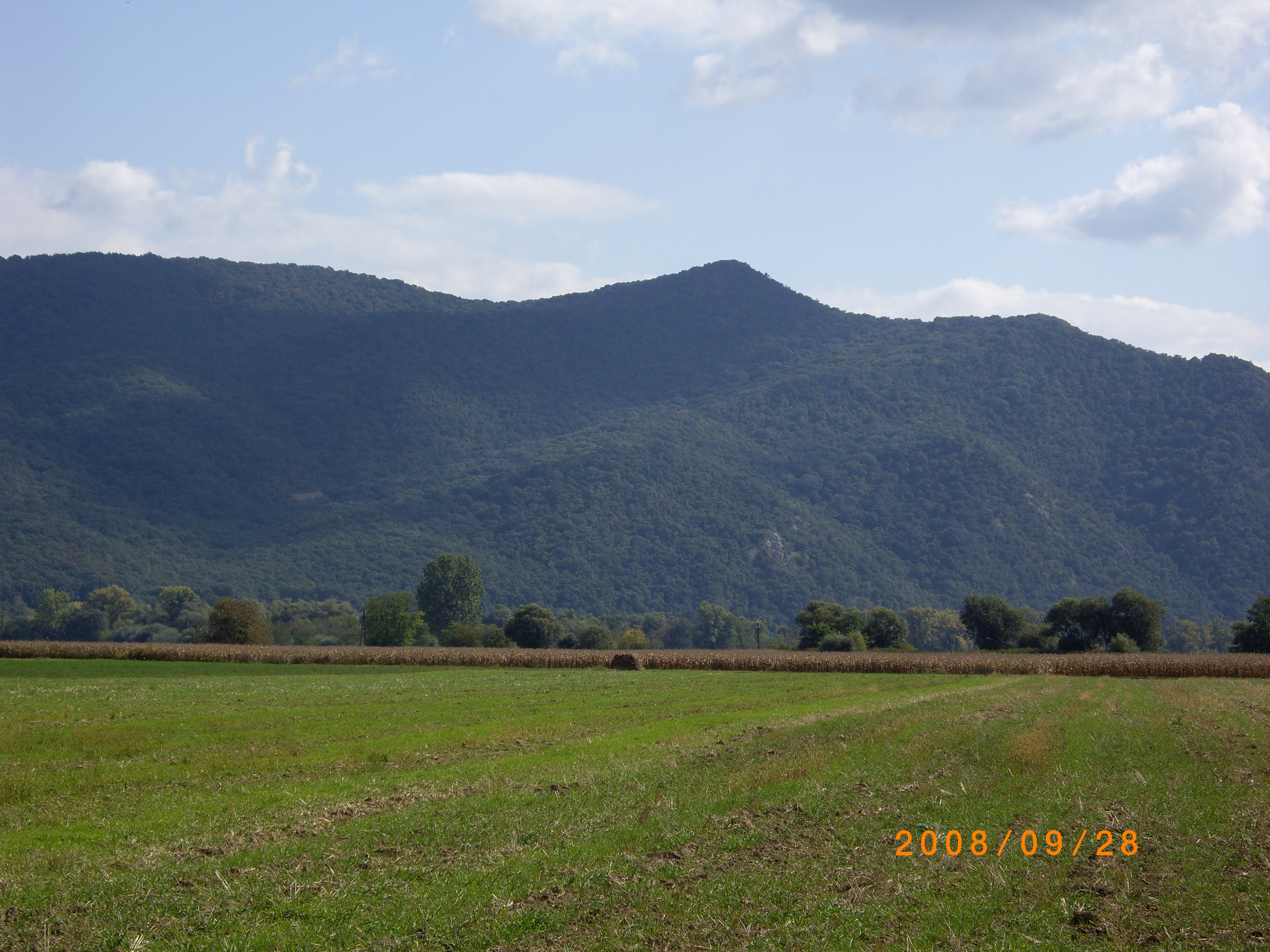

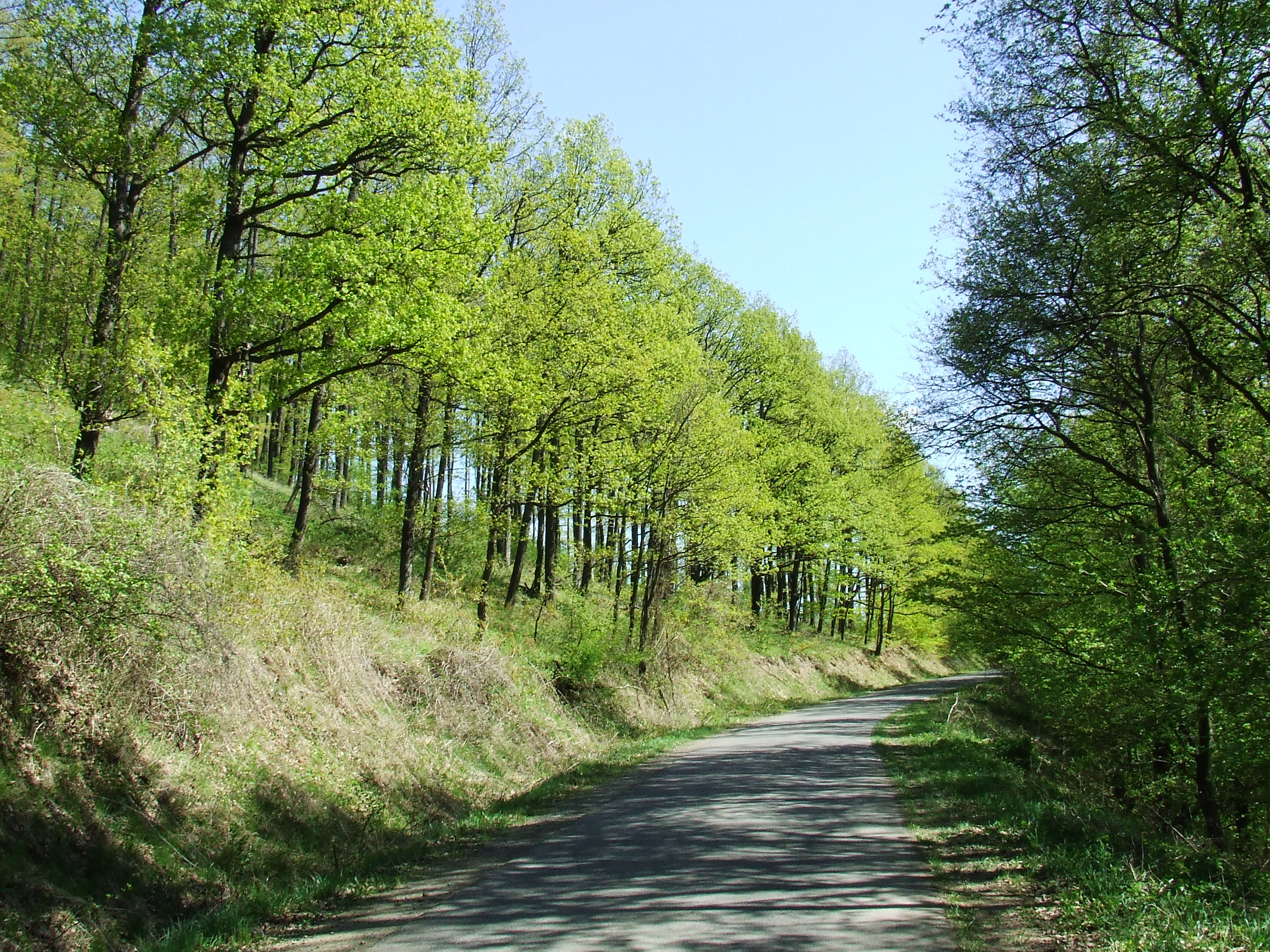

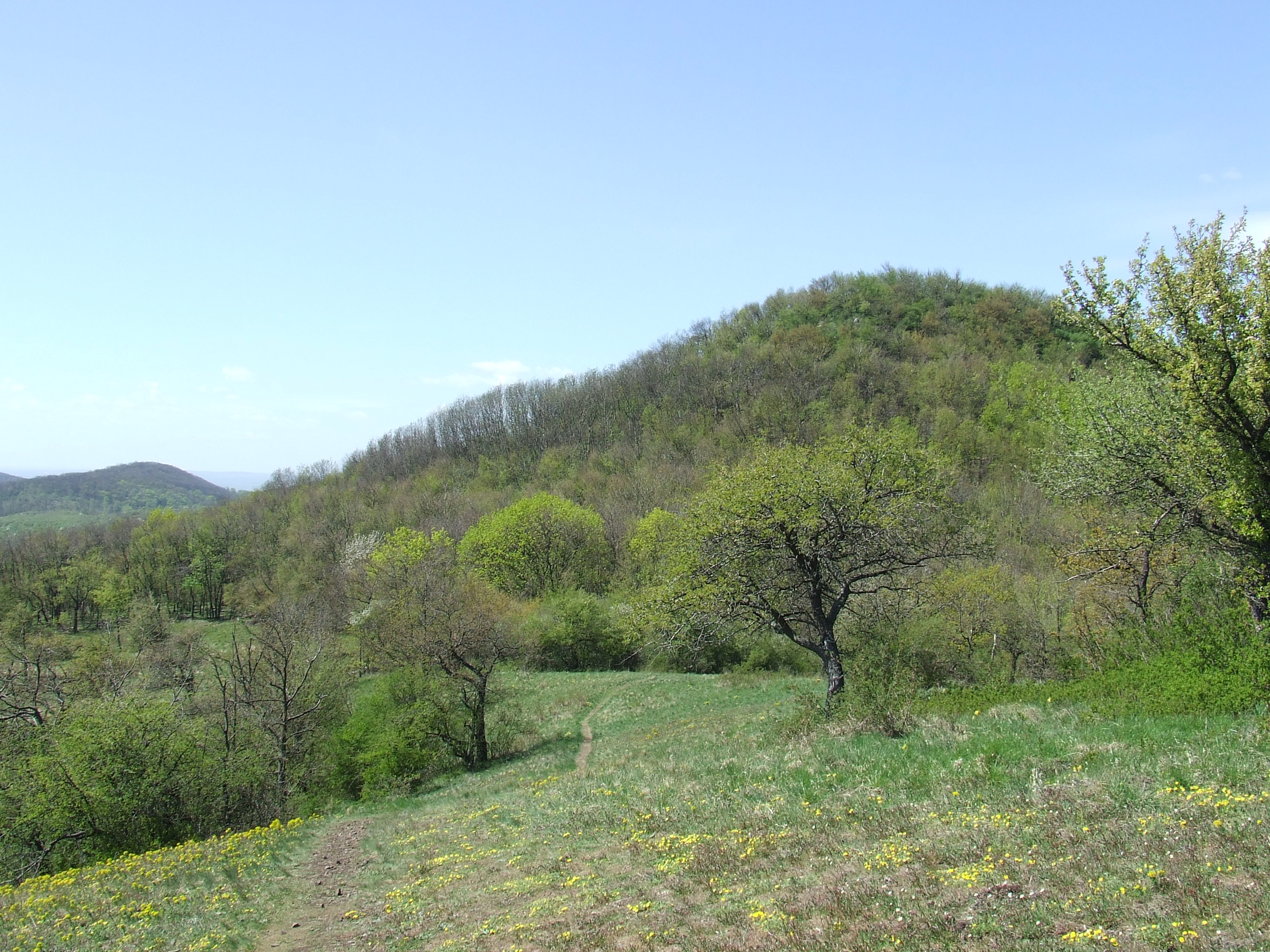

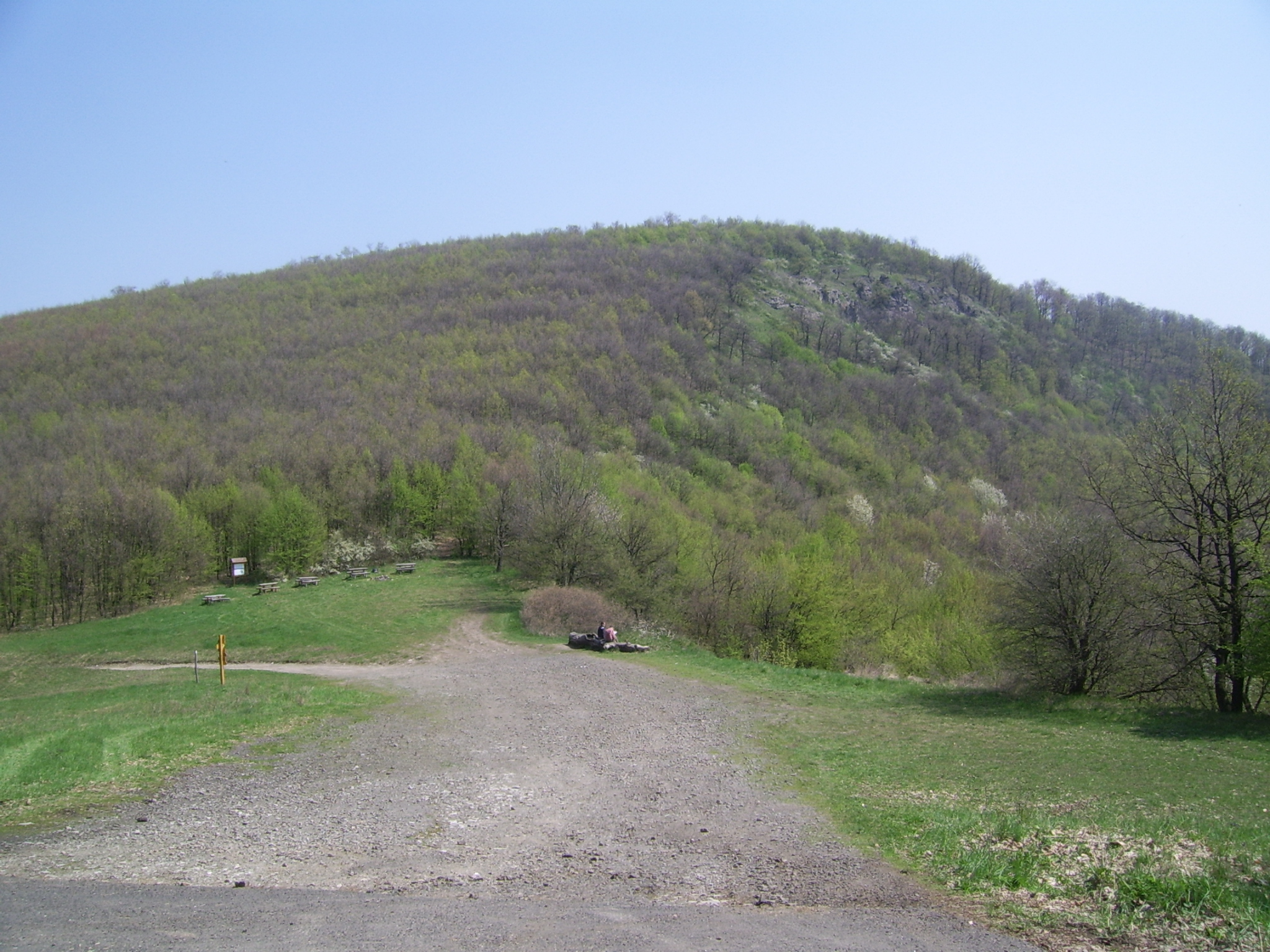

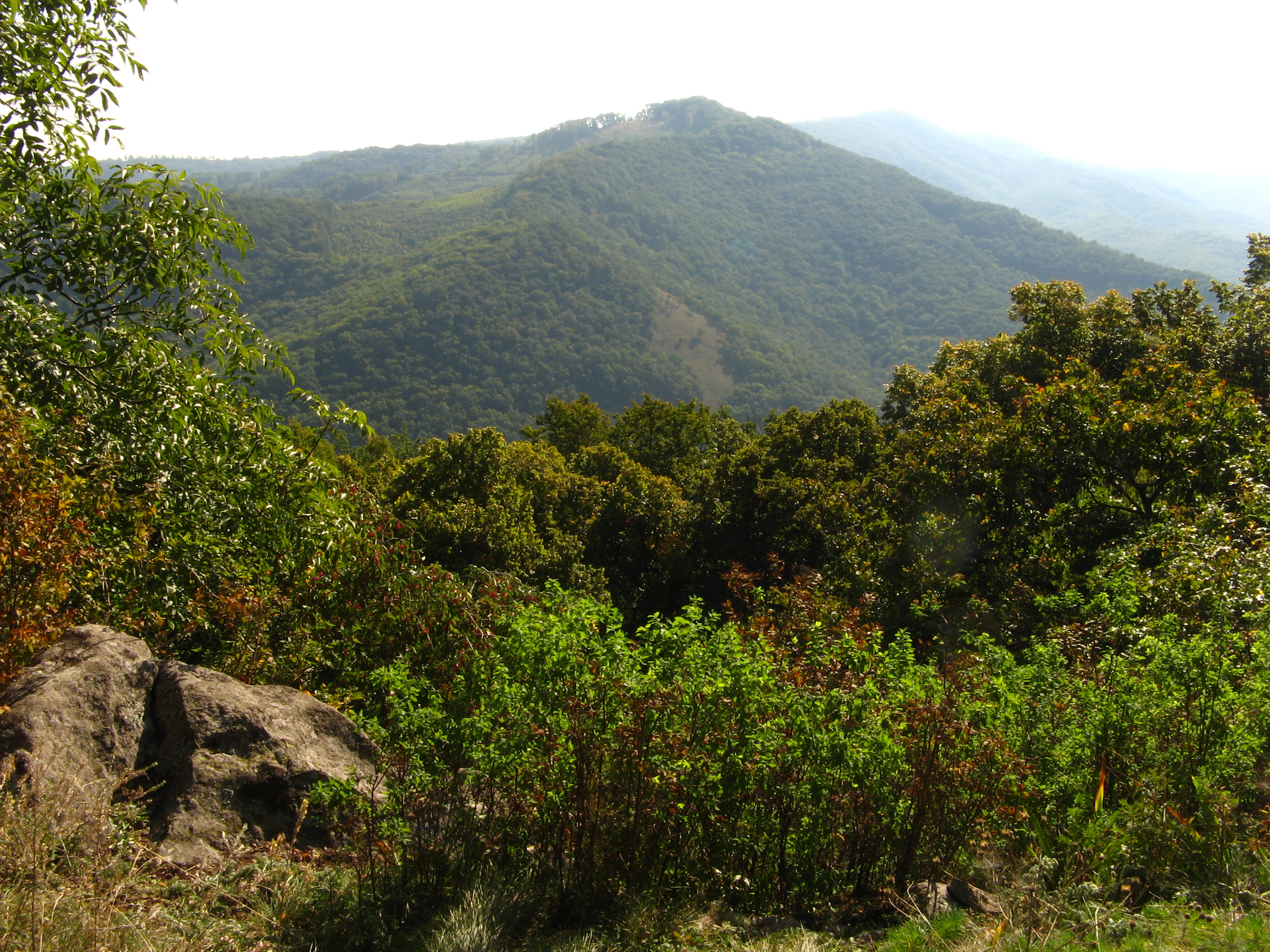

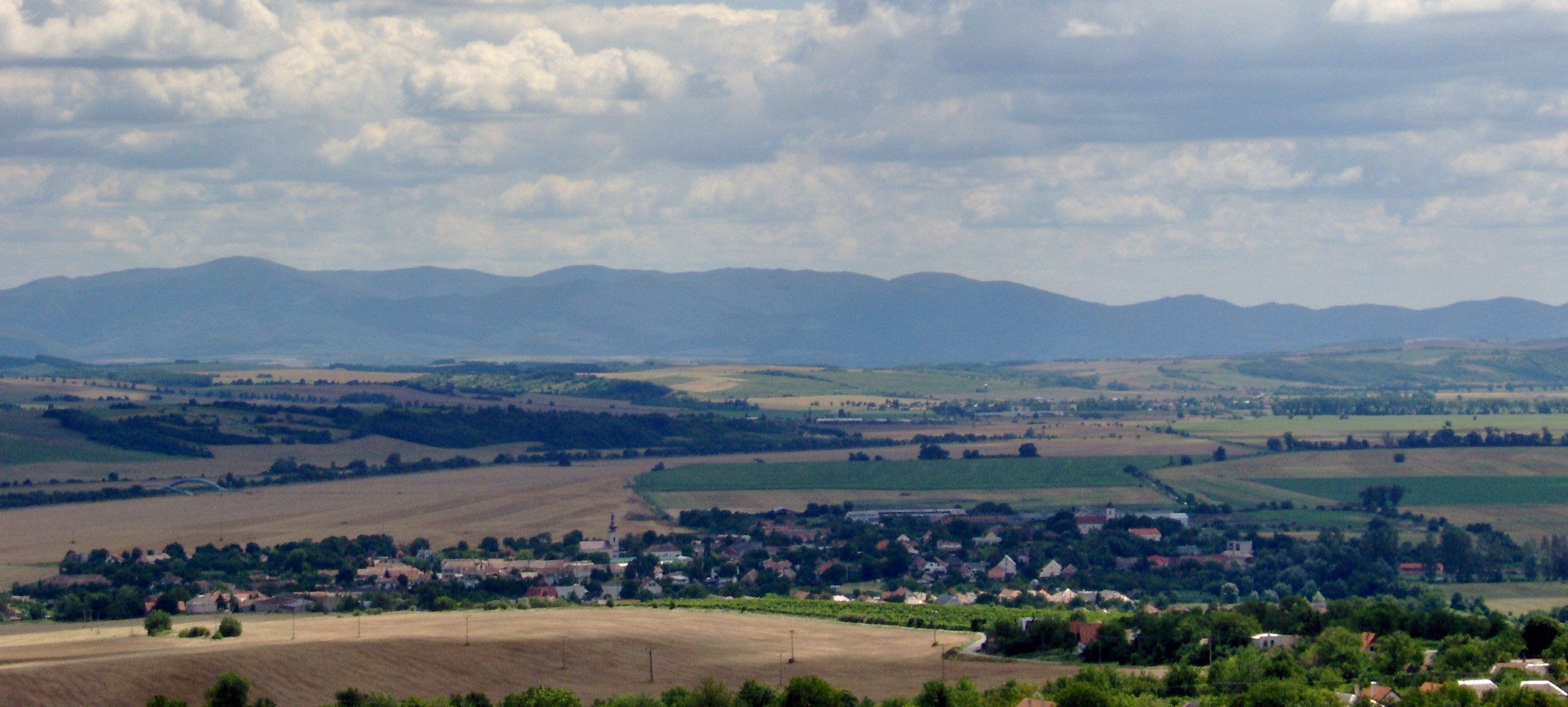

== See also ==
- Geography of Hungary
- North Hungarian Mountains
- Countrywide Blue Tour in Hungary
