= Slanské Hills =

Mountain range in Slovakia

Coordinates: 48°45′N 21°30′E

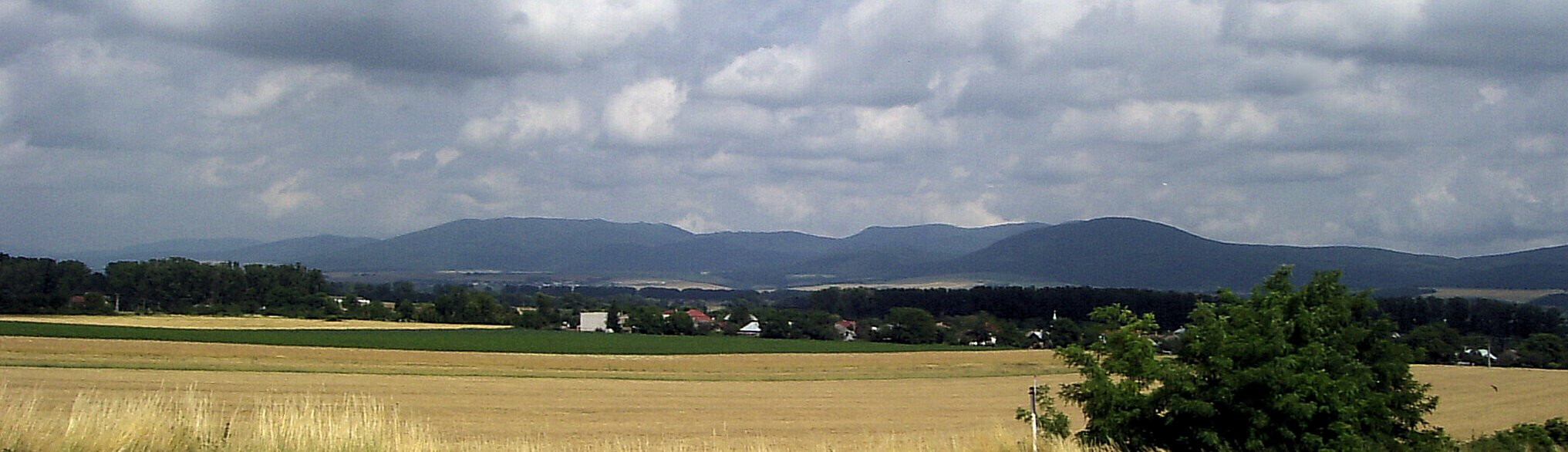
Overlooking Milhost near the Slovak border, to the south of Slanské Hills

The Slanské Hills (in Slovak, Slanské vrchy) is a range of mountains in eastern Slovakia, one segment of the Mátra-Slanec Area of the Inner Western Carpathians.

== Overview ==
The area is named after the nearest town in the southern portion, Slanec. The range is approximately 50 km (31 mi) long, 16 km (9.9 mi) side, and extends southeast of the city of Prešov, between the Košice Basin and the Eastern Slovak Lowland.

The mountains average 800 to 1,000 m (2,600 to 3,300 ft) high, with the highest elevation at Šimonka, 1,092 m (3,583 ft) (where 700 healthy, mature elms were discovered in 1998). The mountains are forested, with several mineral springs, and resources such as gold, silver, and antimony. Passes through the mountains include the Herľany Pass and Dargov Pass (Dargovský priesmyk), site of a significant World War II battle.

== Geology and formation ==
The Slanské Hills are a chain of andesite volcanoes formed simultaneously with marine deposition during the Neogene geological age (20-11 MYA). Volcanoes in the chain include Makovica and Strechový Vrch. Strechový Vrch was one of the most volcanically active peaks.
