= Nagy-Milic =

Mountain in Hungary and Slovakia

Nagy-Milic / Veľký Milič
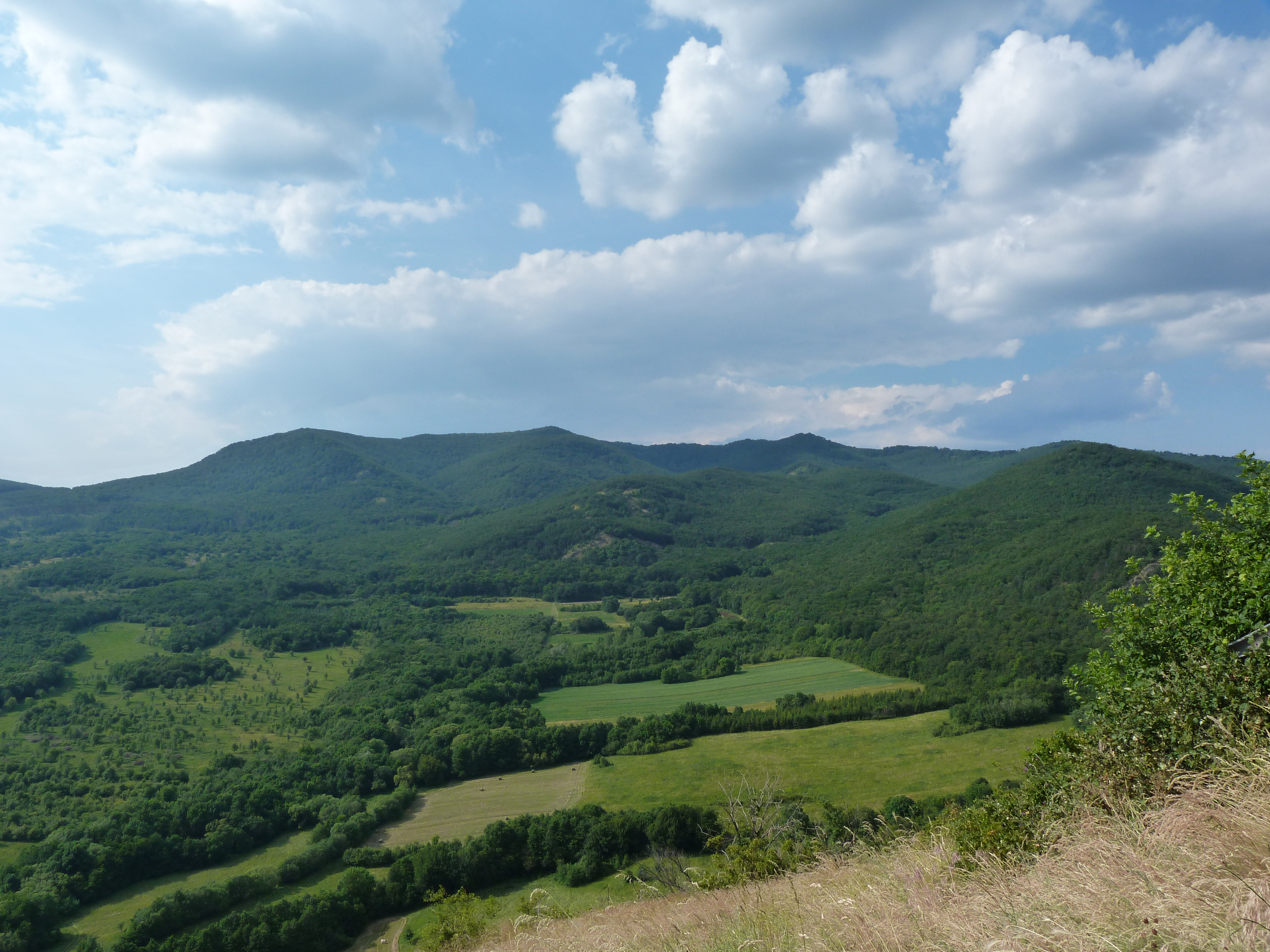
- View from Füzér castle

Highest point
- Elevation: 894 m (2,933 ft)
- Coordinates: 48°34′36″N 21°27′28″E

Geography
- Location within Hungary
- Location: Hungary / Slovakia

Geology
- Mountain type: Volcanic

Nagy-Mack-Milic (Hungarian: [ˈnɒɟmilit͡s]; Slovak: Veľký Milič) is the highest peak of the Hungarian part of the Zemplén Mountains, which is part of the Carpathian Mountains. The mountain is situated on the border of Hungary and Slovakia. It is 894 metres (2,933 ft) high and lies near the northernmost point of Hungary.

== Etymology ==
The name comes from a Slavic personal name derived from milъ (dear), e.g. Milic, Milica frequently used in Slavic place names. Mylychkw (Milic's stone?, 1270).
