= Zemplén Mountains =

Mountain range in Hungary

Coordinates: 48.4000°N 21.4167°E

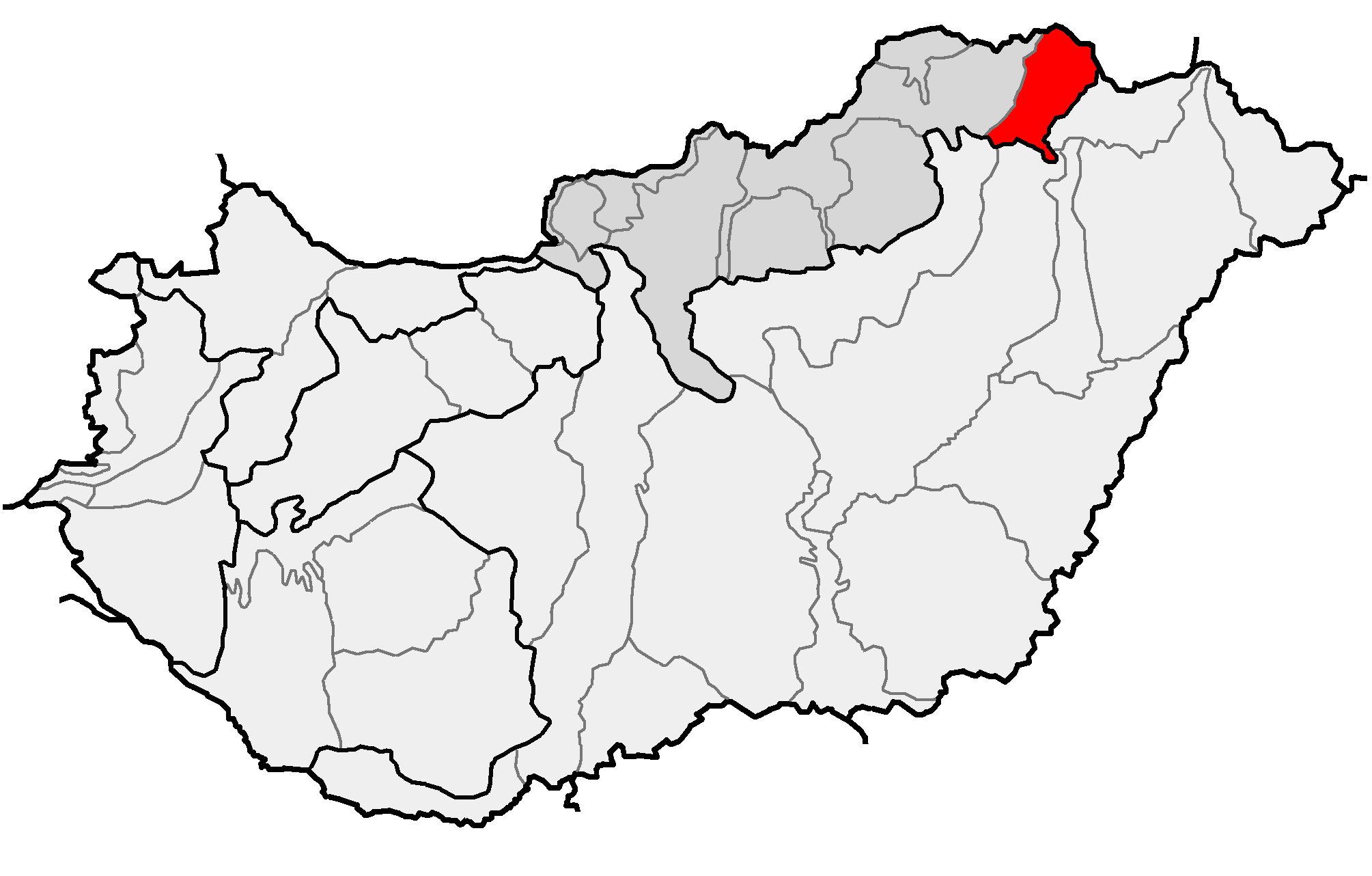
Location of Zemplén-Tokaj Mountains within physical subdivisions of Hungary

Zemplén Mountains (Hungarian: [ˈzɛmpleːn]) or Tokaj Mountains (Hungarian: [ˈtokɒj]; Hungarian: Zempléni-hegység or Tokaji-hegység) is a mountain range in Hungary.

Its highest peak is the Nagy-Milic at 894 metres (2,933 ft) above sea level. The range is part of the North Hungarian Mountains within the Carpathian Mountains. Its steep peaks are the bases for many medieval stone castles, such as the castle of Sárospatak and Füzéri vár (Füzér Castle).

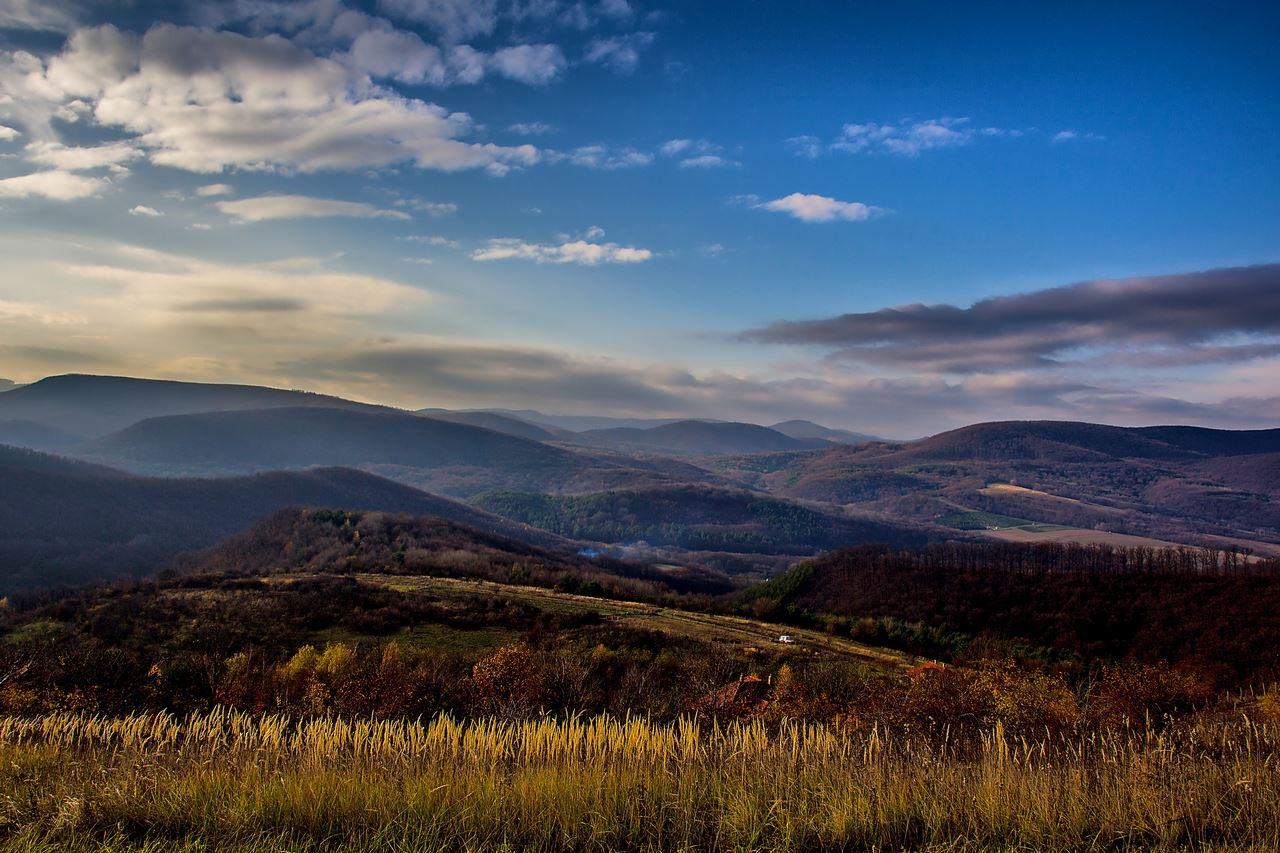
Zemplén Mountains

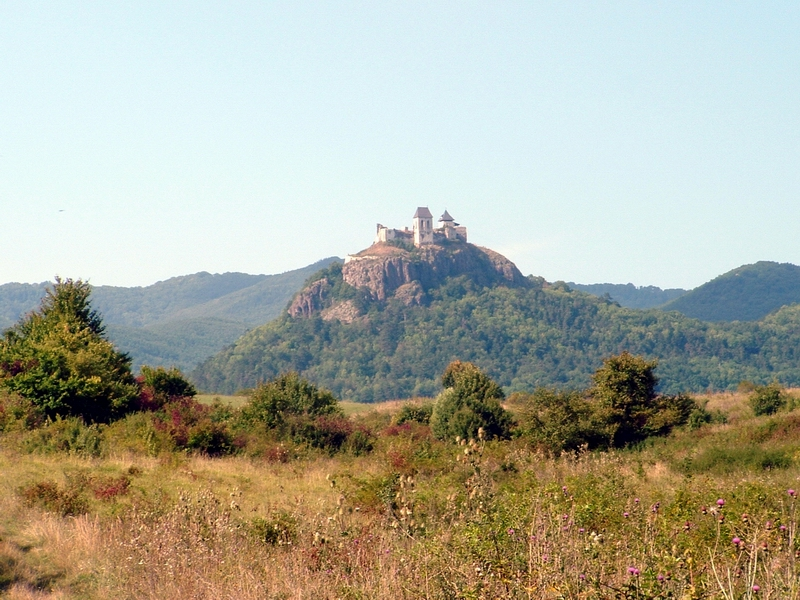
Füzéri vár (Füzér Castle) in the Zemplén Mountains
