= Dunazug Mountains =

Mountains in Hungary

Dunazug Mountains (Hu: Dunazug hegyvidék) is a part of Transdanubian Mountains in Hungary. It is the easternmost part of the mountains that connects it to the Danube Bend and the capital. The name itself also comes from the river (in Hungarian Duna), while zug means recess, corner.

The highest peak is Pilis-tető, about 750 metres,

The mountains are made up of sedimentary rock, mainly limestone.

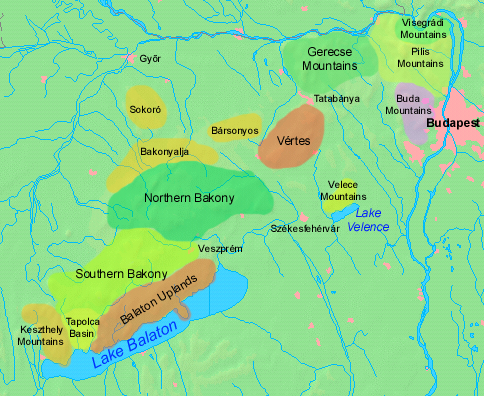
Map of the Transdanubian Mountains with Gerecse, Pilis and Buda Hills in the East

== Parts of the mountains ==
- Gerecse Mountains
- Pilis Mountains
- Buda Hills

== Gallery ==
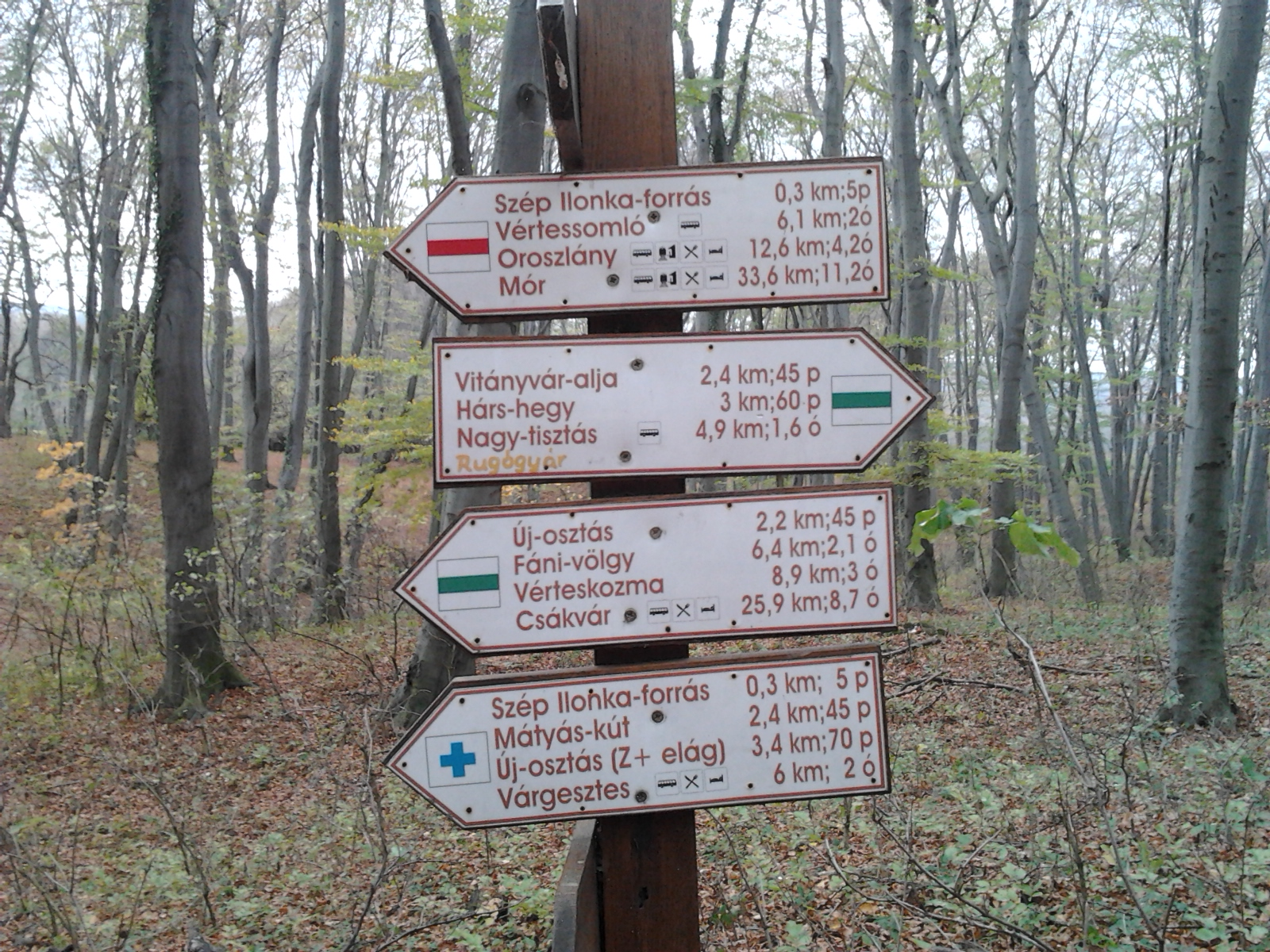

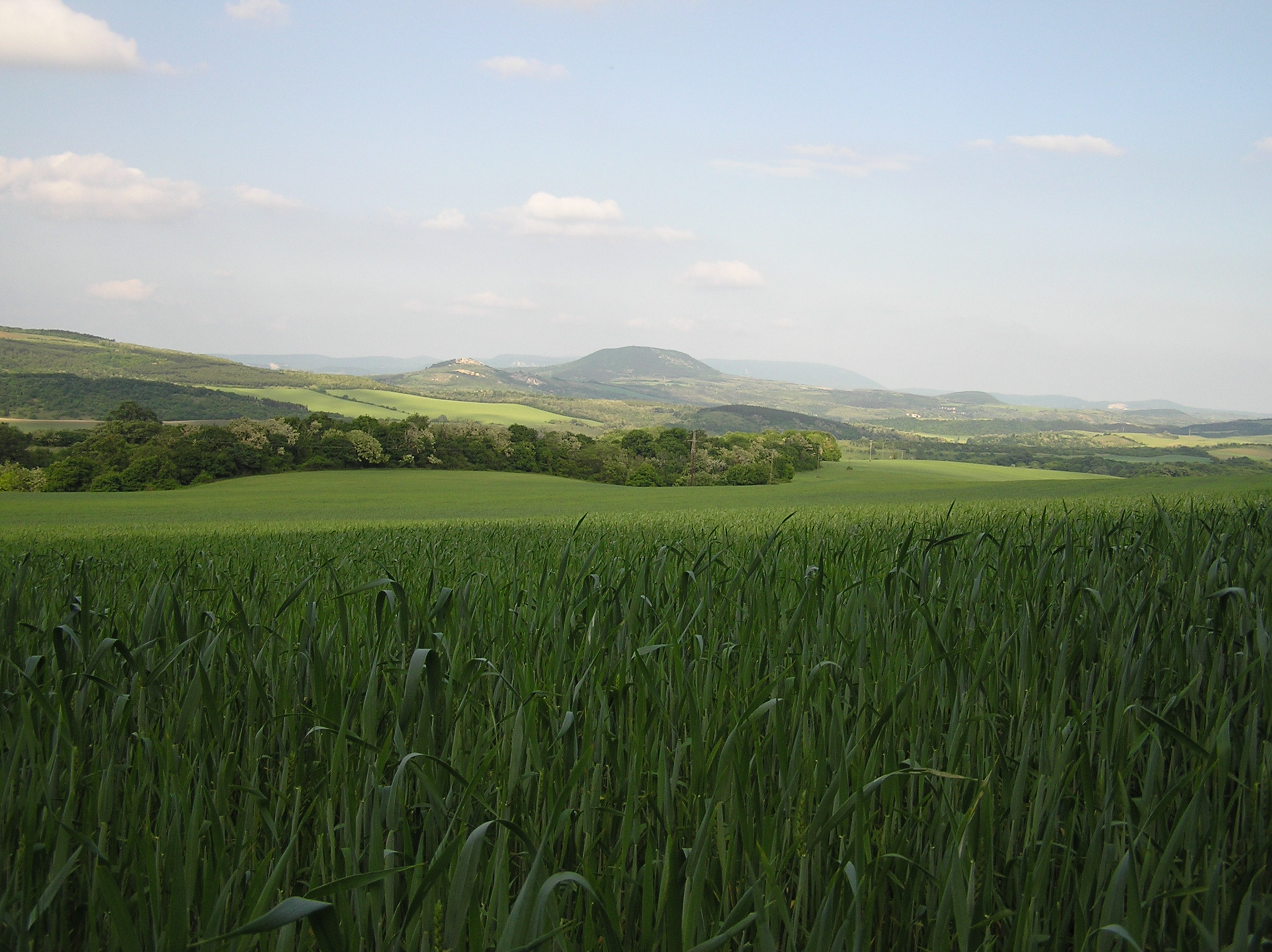

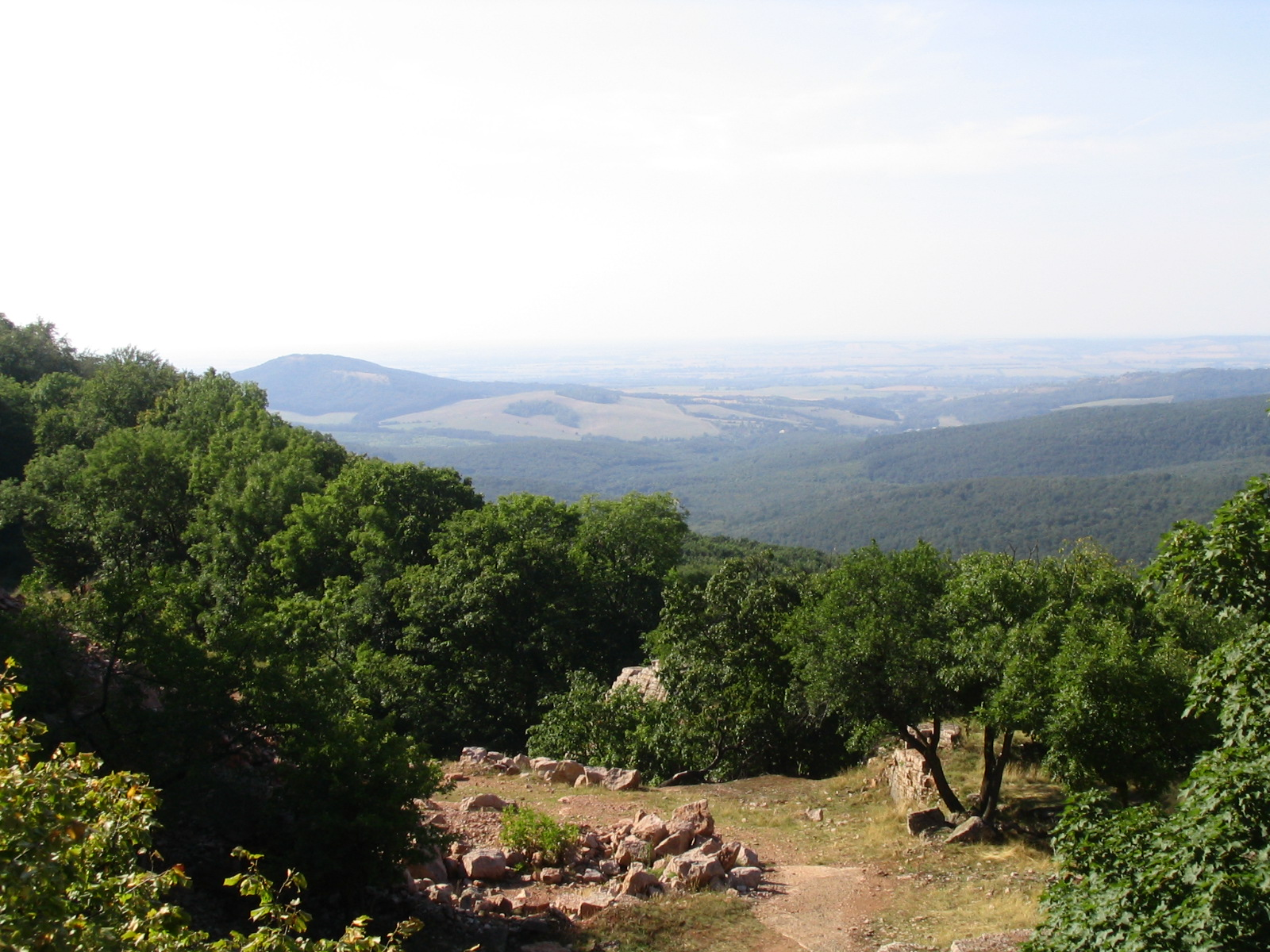

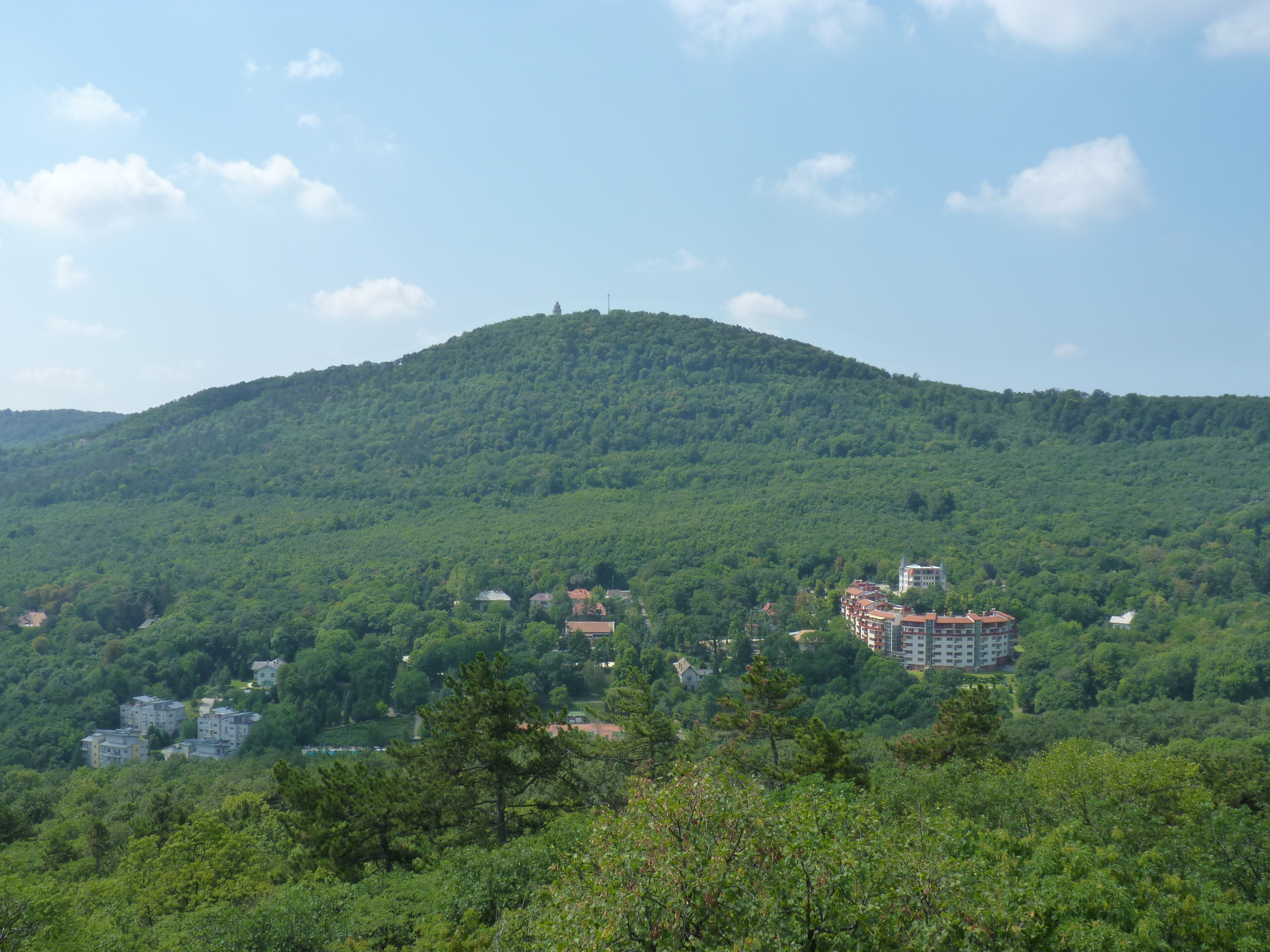

== Sources ==
(In Hungarian)

- https://vandorbot.hu/dunazug-hegyvidek
- https://www.arcanum.hu/hu/
- http://www.karpat-medence.hu
