= Eusebius of Esztergom =

13th-century Hungarian hermit and religious founder

Blessed Eusebius of Esztergom
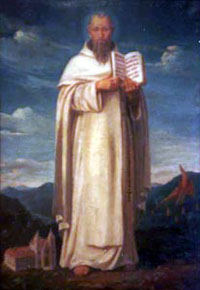
- Eusebius of Esztergom

Priest
- Born: c. 1200; Esztergom, Kingdom of Hungary
- Died: 20 January 1270; Szentkereszt, Kingdom of Hungary (today Pilisszentkereszt, Hungary)
- Venerated in: Roman Catholic Church
- Beatified: 16 November 2004, Vatican City by Pope John Paul II
- Feast: 20 January
- Attributes: Priest's attire
- Patronage: Hermits

Blessed Eusebius of Esztergom (Hungarian: Esztergomi Boldog Özséb; Polish: Euzebiusz z Ostrzyhomia; German: Eusebius von Gran; c. 1200 – 20 January 1270) was a Hungarian canon, hermit and the founder of the Order of Saint Paul the First Hermit.

== Life ==
=== Early years ===
Eusebius was born around the year 1200 in Esztergom, Hungary. According to Gergely Gyöngyösi's book The life of the hermit brothers of I Saint Paul the Hermit (Vitae fratrum Eremitarum Ordinis Sancti Pauli Primi Eremitae, 1496) Eusebius came from a well-known Hungarian family. Cécile Tormay states that Eusebius was a relative of the royal family of Arpads. It can be found in other sources that he was the son of the granger of the royal court.

As a child, Eusebius had shown his deep religious faith and an ability to learn. He spent a lot of time in prayer and contemplation. He studied in the Seminar of Esztergom to become a priest. Later, he was named a cathedral canon at Esztergom, and distributed his prebend among the poor. In his spare time he wrote books. Even the names of these books did not survive. But according to Gyöngyösi these works were written on canon law.

At that time Eusebius was often visited by hermits from the Pilis Mountains who sold him wattled baskets in exchange for bread. Eusebius also visited them personally several times. The life of these hermits aroused his interest and he desired to become a hermit, but his plans were delayed by the Mongol invasion of Europe. He remained at his post, helping to rebuild the country.

=== Hermit ===
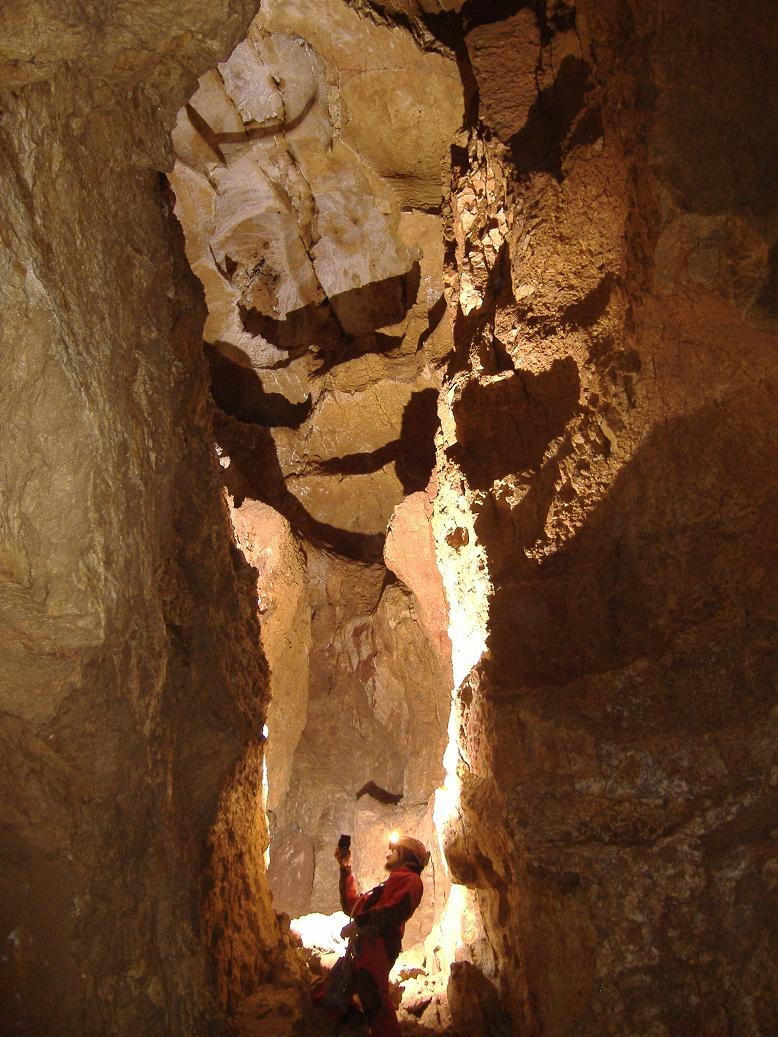
The cave of Eusebius in the Pilis Mountains

In 1246, Eusebius received permission from his bishop, Stephen I Báncsa to become a hermit. He settled in a cave north of Pilisszántó and placed a large wooden cross in front of the entrance of his cave where he prayed and meditated. At that time there were several hermit communities in Hungary who lived disorganized away from society.

One night during prayer Eusebius saw in the whole Pilis Mountains, deep in the forest, many tiny flames which moved towards him and they joined near his cross forming a huge flame. From the cross he heard the words: "“Eusebius, summon all the hermits and found a monastic community. The love present in each will be the bond that will unite you and enable each to give loving service.” Eusebius founded the first Hungarian order in 1250 which later became the Order of Saint Paul the First Hermit. He and his companion hermits erected their first monastery, Holy Cross, in honor of the cross next to the cave. Eusebius became their priest, and as a well-educated, canon law expert became their leader.

Eusebius then started to travel around the country to find other hermit communities. His first route led him to the hermits of Jakab-hegy, Baranya County who since 1225 lived according to the Regula of Bartholomew le Gros, the Bishop of Pécs. The two monasteries united and the hermits chose Eusebius as the head of the order. Paul of Thebes became their patron. They called themselves the Brothers of I Saint Paul the Hermit. Their other name was the Brothers of the Saint Cross from the name of their first monastery.

Many people joined his order and adopted his strict rule. Their parents and friends tried to dissuade them, but Eusebius said to them: "Christ loved his mother very much, but with his suffering his mother was tormented by the pain of his pain. He could have got off the cross, but he did not do it because he had fulfilled the will of his Heavenly Father. Likewise, we do not want to get off the cross of penance because people cry for us."

On the 1256 National Council of Esztergom, Eusebius wrote his name as the First Provincial of the Order of Saint Paul the First Hermit. In 1262 he went to Rome with his companions to meet Pope Urban IV to ask him for approval for founding his own order. He had the support of Thomas Aquinas and Stephen I Báncsa. The pope first refused to give Eusebius his permission because of financial conditions and asked Paul Balog, the Bishop of Veszprém to examine the monasteries.

During Eusebius' life, there were 16 monasteries of his order. Later this number reached 150. Eusebius served for 20 years as provincial. As he felt that his death is near he gathered his companions around him, blessed them and calmly died on the 20 January 1270.

Papal legate Cardinal Gentilis de Monte Florido gave the order the Rule of St Augustine, and it received approval with the decree ‘Qui saecularia’, issued in Buda on 13 December 1308.

== Gallery ==
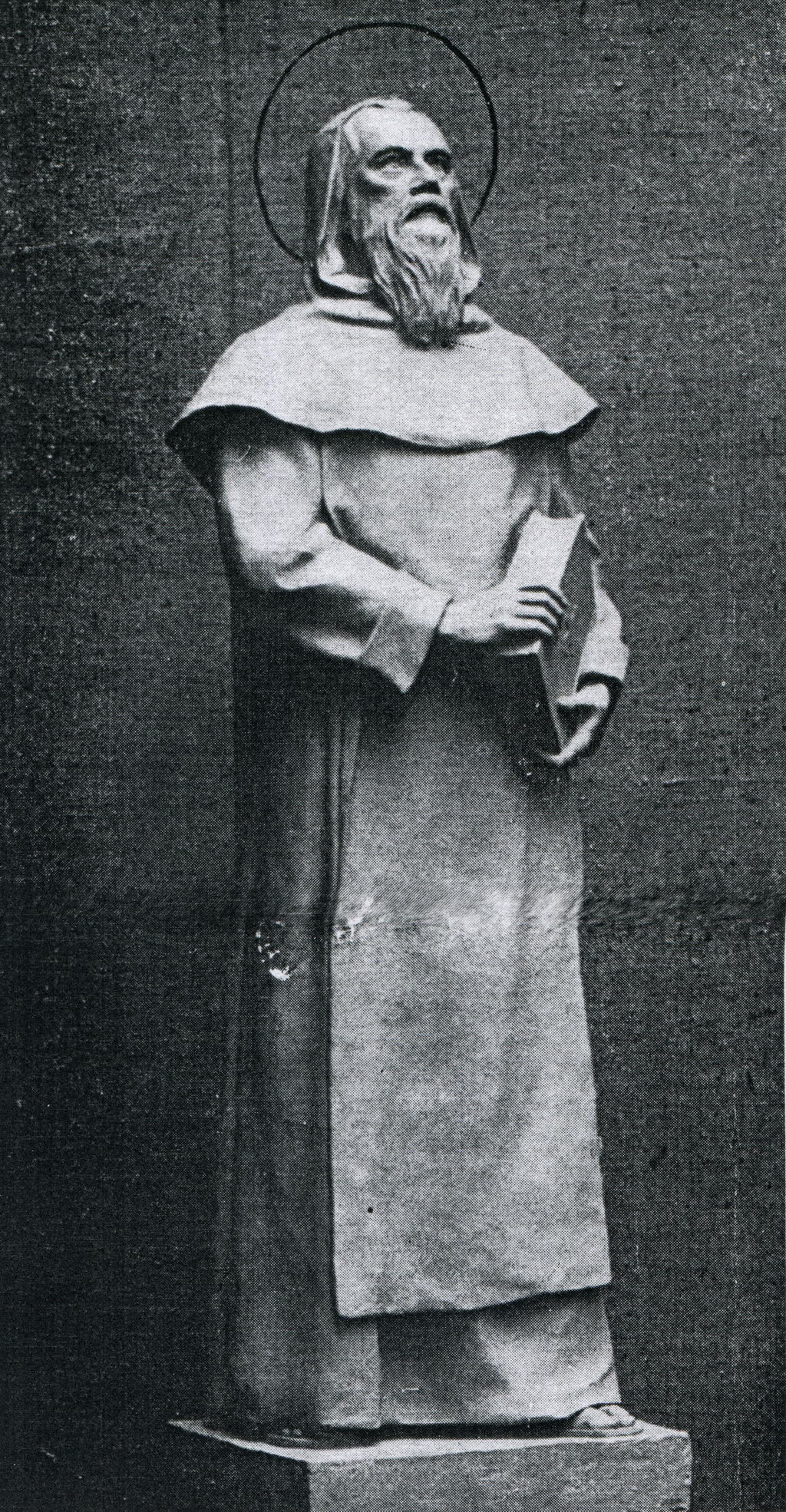
Blessed Eusebius of Esztergom by Éva Vargha (1930s)

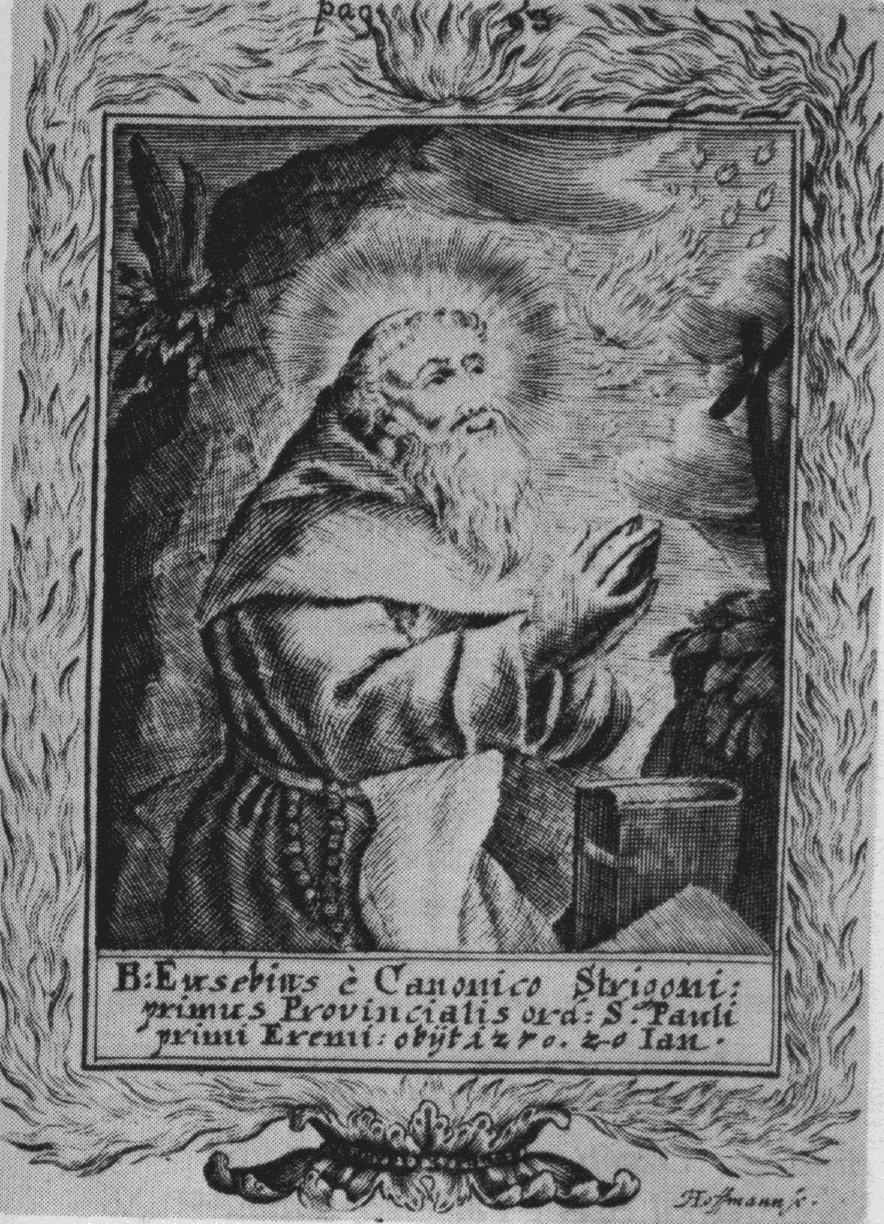
Engraving plate with blessed Eusebius of Esztergom by Hoffmann (18th century)

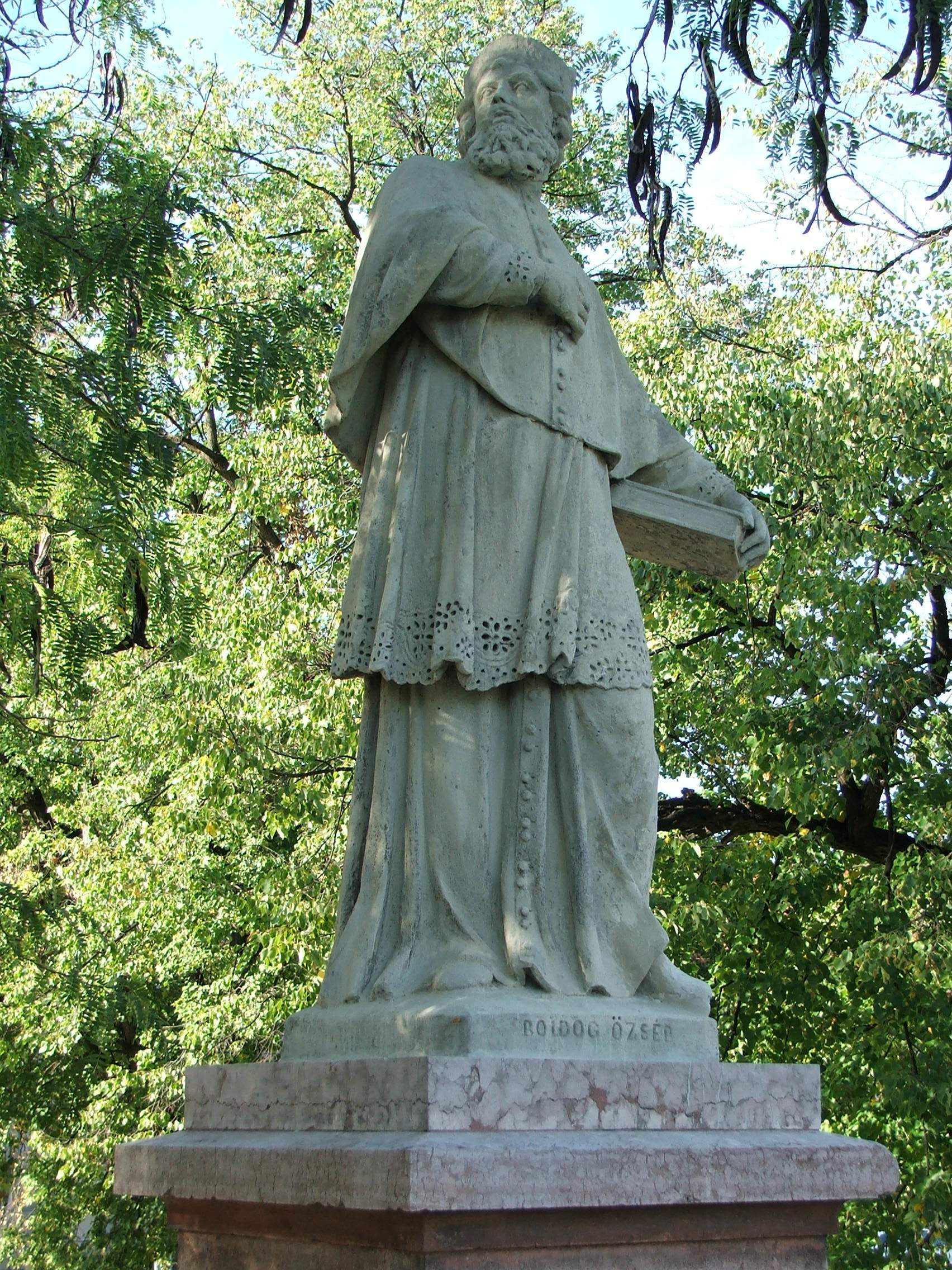

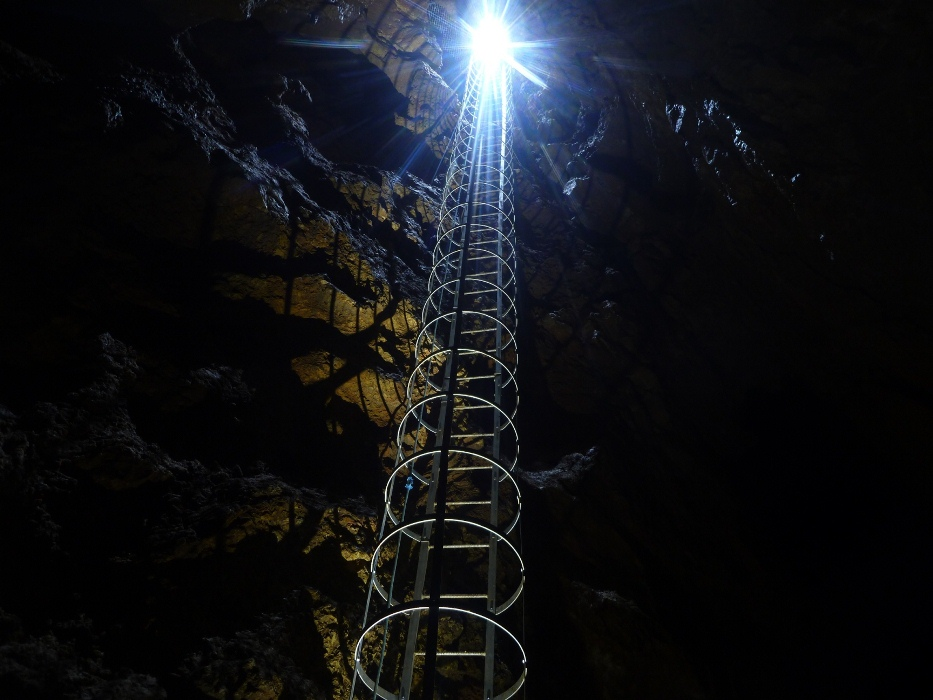
Entrance hall of the cave of Eusebius

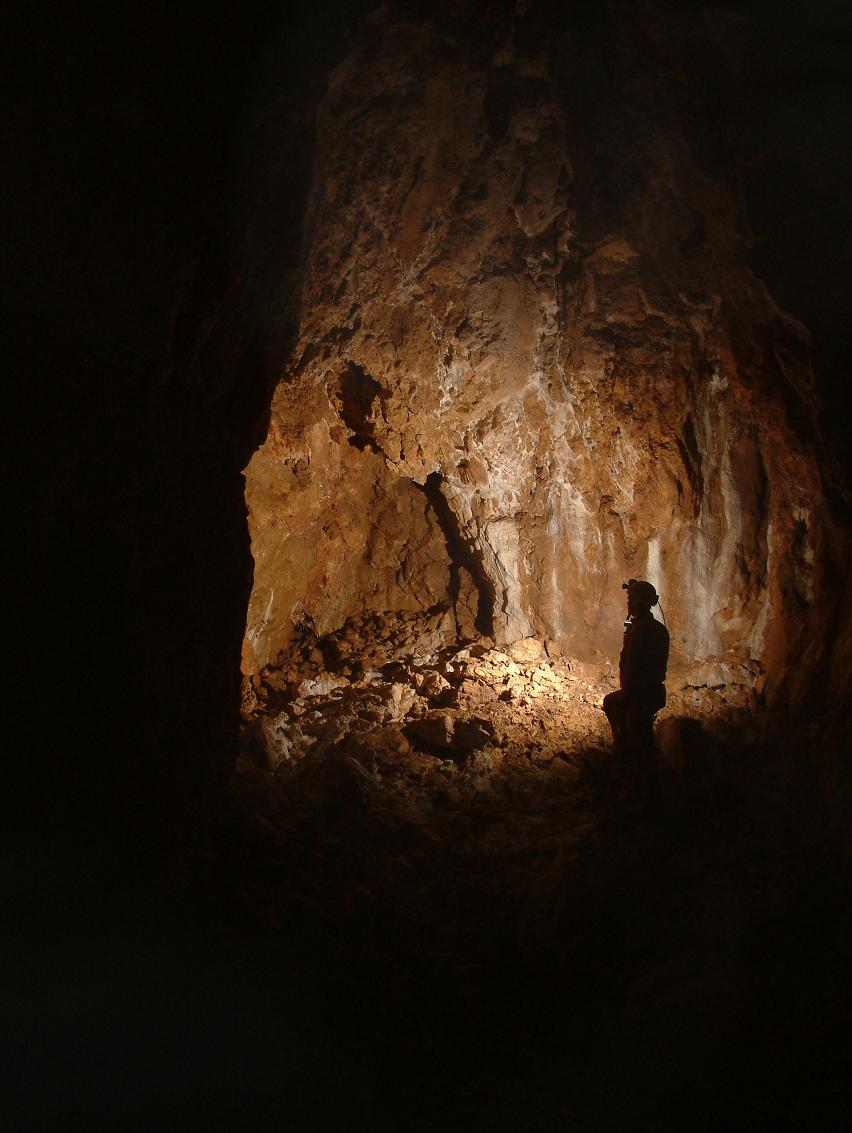
Entrance hall of the cave of Eusebius

== Literature ==
- Gergely Gyöngyösi – The life of the hermit brothers of I Saint Paul the Hermit (Vitae fratrum Eremitarum Ordinis Sancti Pauli Primi Eremitae) 1496

== Sources ==
- Hesz, Árpád Attila (2021). "Boldog Özséb, a pálos rend alapítója a történeti irodalom tükrében [Blessed Eusebius of Esztergom, Founder of the Order of Saint Paul as Reflected by Historical Literature]". Magyar Sion Új folyam (in Hungarian). 15 (1): 41–61. ISSN 1337-2491.
- Scheffer, Miklós (2020). "Legenda vagy valóság? Boldog Özséb személye Gyöngyösi Gergely rendtörténeti krónikájában és szerepe a Pálos Rend megalakulásában [Legend or Reality? The Person of Blessed Eusebius in the Chronicle of Gergely Gyöngyösi and his Role in the Formation of the Pauline Order]". Egyháztörténeti Szemle (in Hungarian). 21 (2): 21–39. ISSN 1585-7476.
