= Battle of Vértes =

1051 battle in Hungary

Date	1051
Location	Vértes Hills, Hungary
Result	Victory of the Hungarians and expulsion of the German troops

Belligerents
Holy Roman Empire	Kingdom of Hungary

Commanders and leaders
Henry III, Holy Roman Emperor	Andrew I of Hungary; Duke Béla

Strength
Unknown	Unknown

Casualties and losses
Heavy	Light

The Battle of Vértes (Hungarian: vértesi csata), was a conflict that broke out in 1051, when the Emperor Henry III tried to invade Hungary and was defeated by King Andrew I of Hungary and Duke Béla of Hungary.

== Background ==
Kingdom of Hungary in the 11th Century – German Wars

After the death of King Saint Stephen I of Hungary in 1038, a series of succession conflicts arose in the kingdom, until King Andrew I secured power in 1046. After the death of the Emperor Saint Henry II, his successor, Emperor Conrad II, a member of another dynasty, tried to take Hungary as a vassal kingdom. His son, Emperor Henry III, also continued this same policy, and thus attacked the Kingdom of Hungary in 1051.

Andrew I was prepared that in time Henry III would want revenge for his previously lost estate. Andrew persuaded his brother, Béla, to return from Poland to Hungary in 1048, and made Prince Béla the commander-in-chief of the Hungarian armies, who had extensive political and military experience. He also granted his brother one third of the kingdom with the title of duke, also meant a high degree of independence for Béla.

Skirmishes on the frontier between Hungary and the Holy Roman Empire first occurred in 1050. Emperor Henry III invaded Hungary in August 1051.

== Battle ==
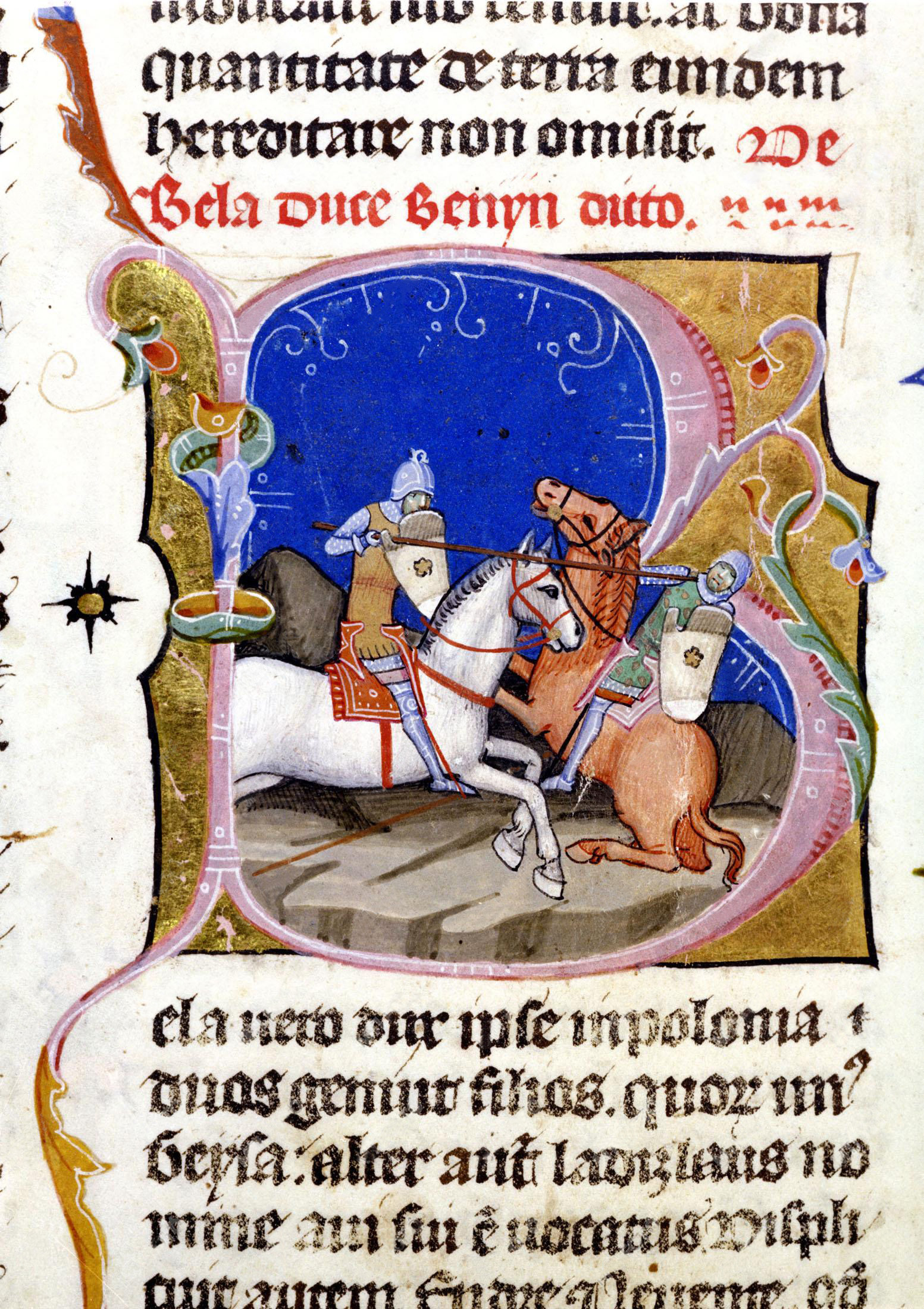
Duke Béla (Chronicon Pictum, 1358)

The German army approached the Hungarians from two directions. One of the teams crossed the Vág River and penetrated until the Nitra River. Bypassing the western border gate (Bufferzone (Hungarian: gyepű) of Moson-Sopron), Henry III broke into Transdanubia from Styria. The other army was led by Bishop Gebhard of Regensburg, this corps secured the Danube River and on which the supply was transported to the army.

The German troops sought the battle, but the Hungarians used the scorched earth tactics against the imperial troops, just as Stephen did in 1030 against Conrad II. The population was evacuated from the German army, food was taken away or destroyed. Despite this, the Germans reached Vértes Hills and, according to some sources Székesfehérvár. However, Duke Béla directed his armies into the backs of the Germans to strengthen the part between Zala River and Rába River, as well as the bufferzones of Moson. The Germans were starving because they found no food and their supply was hampered. The German army were constantly accompanied by the Hungarians and minor clashes were almost in every day. The Hungarian horse archers struck the guards at night, wandered between the marching troops and disappeared after firing an arrow or two. It was then that the German decided, leaving the Vértes Hills, to turn north to the ships carrying the supplies. But the ships were no longer there, because Duke Béla captured one of their couriers and sent a letter to the bishop on behalf of the Germans stating that the campaign was over and return to Regensburg.

You know, excellent Bishop Gebhard, the great and dangerous affairs of our empire are forcing us to return from Hungary to Germany: for our enemies have occupied our empire. So go in a hurry, destroy the ships as fast as you can, and hurry after us to Regensburg, because in Hungary you are no longer safe. And the Emperor was disappointed in his hope of getting help from the ships and was starving to death. A miserable scourge afflicted all his army, along with the horses and pack animals. In addition, the Hungarians and the Pechenegs were brutally harassed them from night to night, killed them with poisoned arrows, throwing tether among their tents, and thus captivating many of those who had been on some duty. The Germans were terrified of the shower of arrows that flooded and consumed them, dug themselves into the ground, and covered their shields above them, the alive and dead ones are lying in the same grave. Because in the tomb, which was excavated for the dead during the day, alive lay in the night, and what they dug for alive at night, it was occupied by dead for a day.

— Mark of Kalt: Chronicon Pictum, 1358

According to a legend documented in medieval Hungarian chronicles, the Vértes mountains were named after this incident: during the unsuccessful campaign of 1051–1052, the withdrawing German troops of Henry III, emperor of the Holy Roman Empire, scattered their armours to ease their escape through the mountains, hence the name Vértes (vért: Hungarian word for armor).

== Aftermath ==
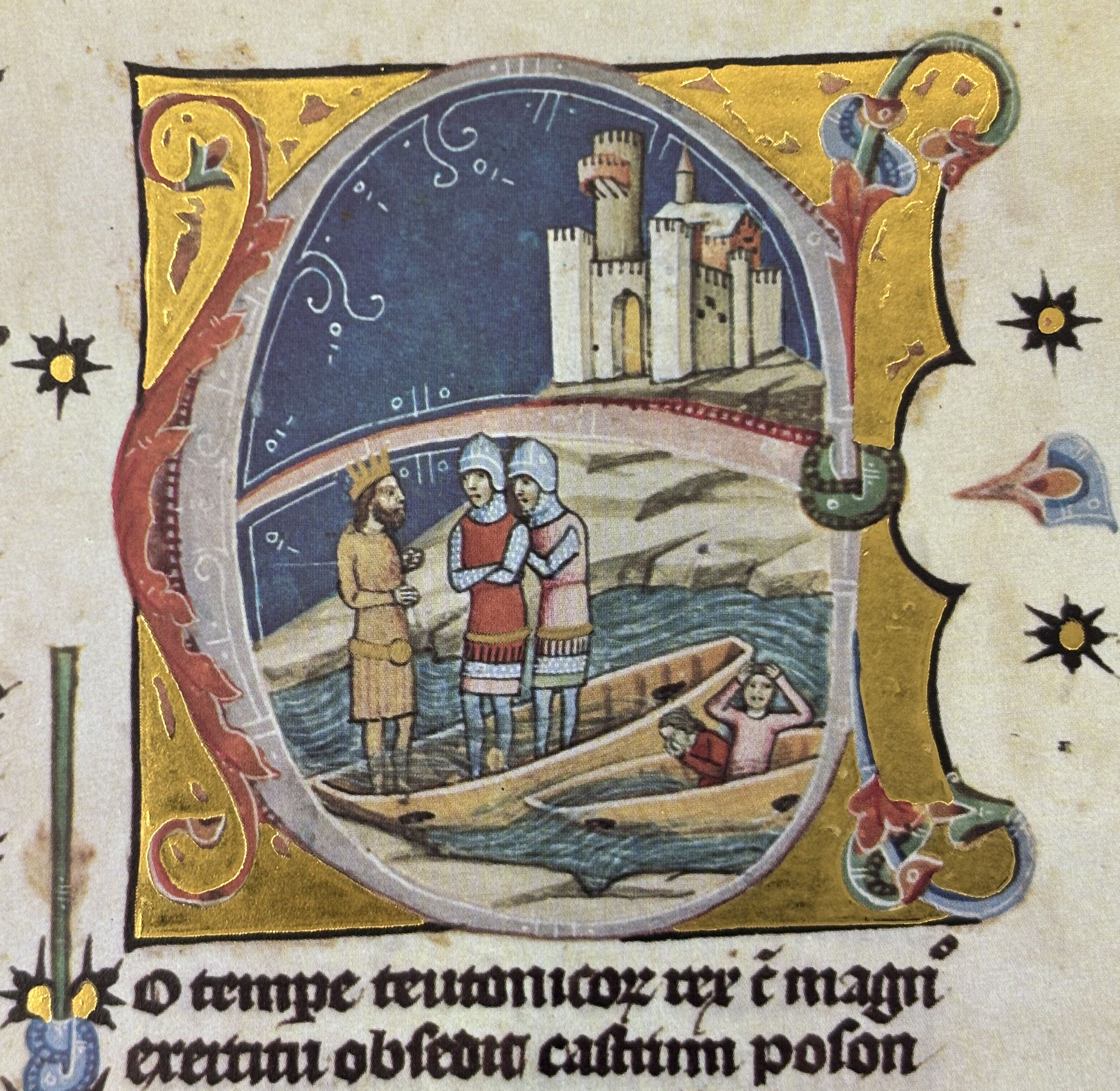
The destruction of Emperor Henry III ships at Pozsony (now Bratislava) city in 1052 (Chronicon Pictum, 1358)

After this defeat, the German armies were repelled by Andrew I of Hungary in the Battle of Pozsony in 1052, definitively ending Henry III's claims on Hungary.

== Bibliography ==
- Bartl, Július; Čičaj, Viliam; Kohútova, Mária; Letz, Róbert; Segeš, Vladimír; Škvarna, Dušan (2002). Slovak History: Chronology & Lexicon. Bolchazy-Carducci Publishers, Slovenské Pedegogické Nakladatel'stvo. ISBN 0-86516-444-4.
- Engel, Pál (2001). The Realm of St Stephen: A History of Medieval Hungary, 895–1526. I.B. Tauris Publishers. ISBN 1-86064-061-3.
- Kristó, Gyula (2003). Háborúk és hadviselés az Árpádok korában [Wars and Tactics under the Árpáds] (in Hungarian). Szukits Könyvkiadó. ISBN 978-963-9441-87-3.
- Kristó, Gyula; Makk, Ferenc (1996). Az Árpád-ház uralkodói [=Rulers of the House of Árpád] (in Hungarian). I.P.C. Könyvek. ISBN 963-7930-97-3.
- Steinhübel, Ján (2011). "The Duchy of Nitra". In Teich, Mikuláš; Kováč, Dušan; Brown, Martin D. (eds.). Slovakia in History. Cambridge University Press. pp. 15–29. ISBN 978-0-521-80253-6.
