= Dobogókő =

Coordinates: 47°43′N 18°54′E

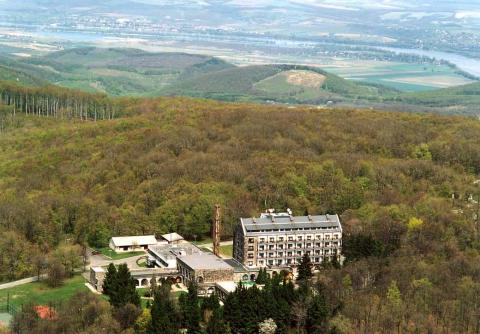

Dobogókő is a popular tourist area near Pilisszentkereszt in Hungary, and the site of the highest point in the Visegrád Hills at 699 meters. 133 people live here.

Up in the hills lies the Ödön Téry Memorial, a stone pyramid built in memory of one of great pioneers of Hungarian tourism. In Dobogókő there is a tourist museum and accommodation. There are hiking possibilities to Prédikálószék, Rám-szakadék, and Árpádvár. Nearby larger settlements are Dömös and Szentendre.

Dobogókő is also a pilgrimage site for Hungarian neopagans (followers of the revived Táltos faith, that is similar to shamanism) who believe that the place is the "heart chakra" of the earth.
