= Transdanubian Mountains =

Mountain range in Hungary

Coordinates: 47.25°N 17.8333°E

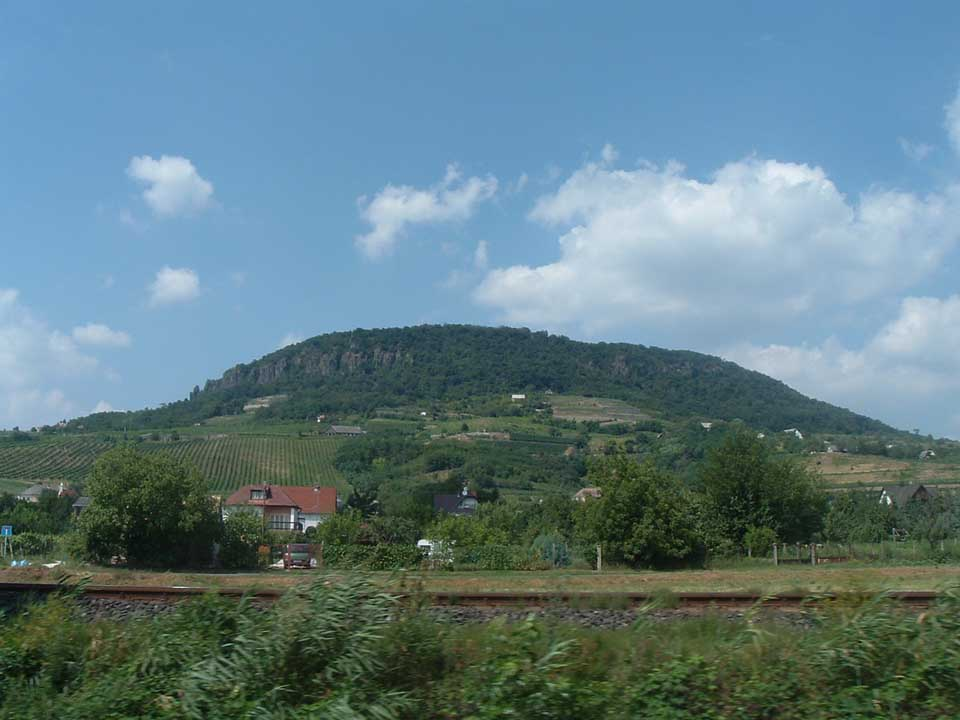
- Badacsony, an isolated mountain in the range. In ancient times, it was an active volcano
- Location: Komárom-Esztergom, Fejér, Veszprém, Zala, Pest counties, Hungary

Area
  - Total: 7,000 km^{2} (2,700 sq mi)
- Highest elevation: 757 m (2,484 ft) (Pilis)

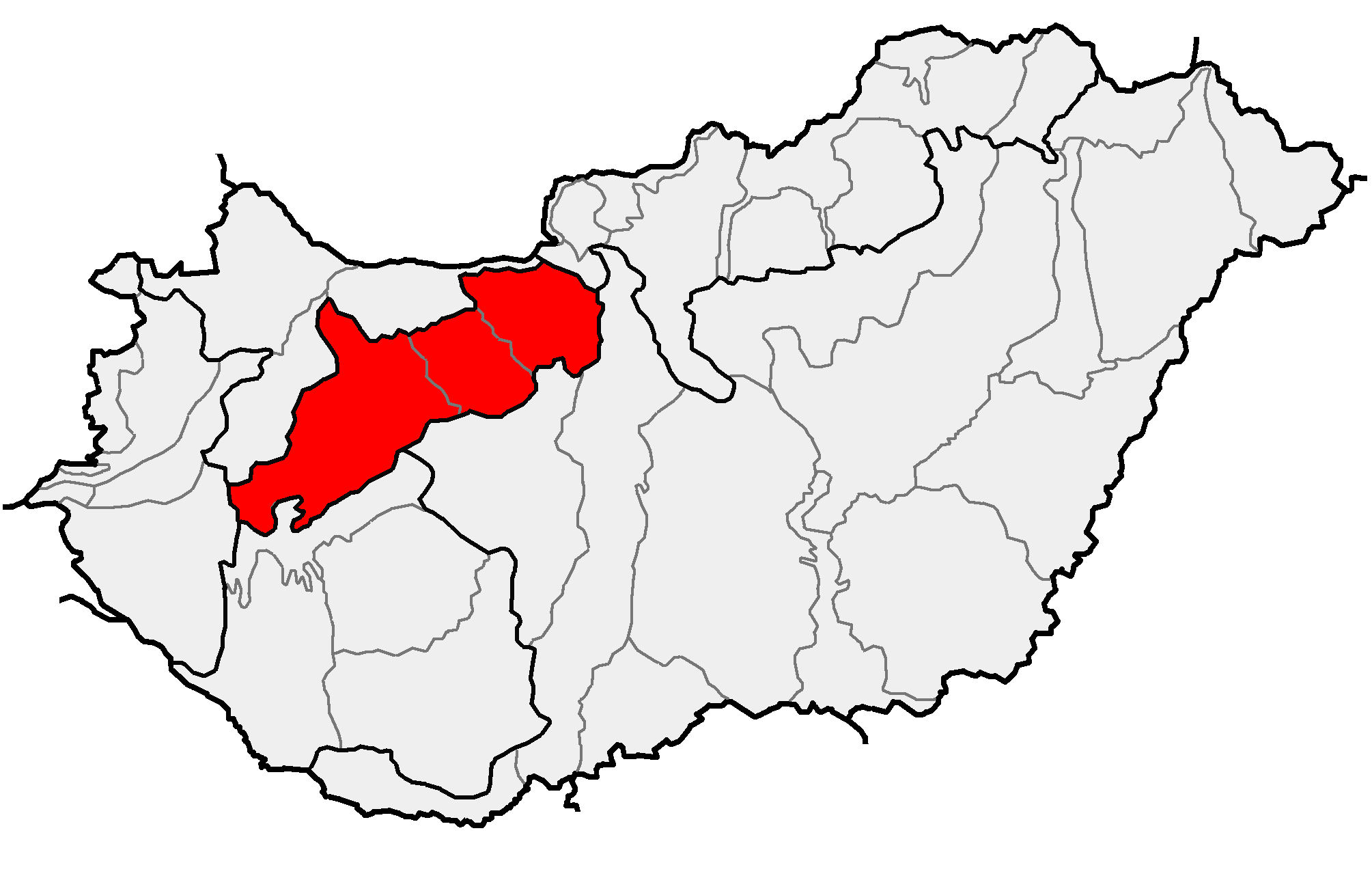
Transdanubian Mountains within physical subdivisions of Hungary

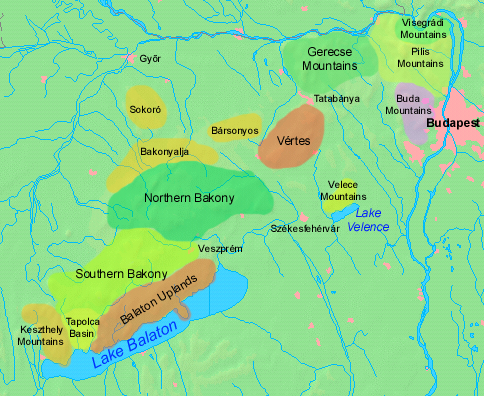
Map of the Transdanubian Mountains

The Transdanubian Mountains (sometimes also referred to as Bakony Forest, Dunántúl Highlands, Highlands of Dunántúl, Highlands of Transdanubia, Mountains of Dunántúl, Mountains of Transdanubia, Transdanubian Central Range, Transdanubian Hills, Transdanubian Midmountains or Transdanubian Mid-Mountains, Hungarian: Dunántúli-középhegység) are a mountain range in Hungary covering about 7000 km^{2}. Its highest peak is the Pilis, with a height of 757 m (2,484 ft).

== Parts of the mountains ==
- Bakony
  - Southern Bakony
  - Northern Bakony
    - Keszthely Plateau
    - Tapolca Basin
    - Balaton Uplands
      - Bakonyalja
      - Sokoró Hills
- Vértes Mountains
  - Vértesalja (Bársonyos)
- Velence Hills
- Dunazug Mountains
  - Gerecse Mountains
  - Buda Hills
  - Pilis Mountains

Visegrád Mountains are often considered a part of it for geopolitical reasons, but geographically they are part of the North Hungarian Mountains.

== Gallery ==
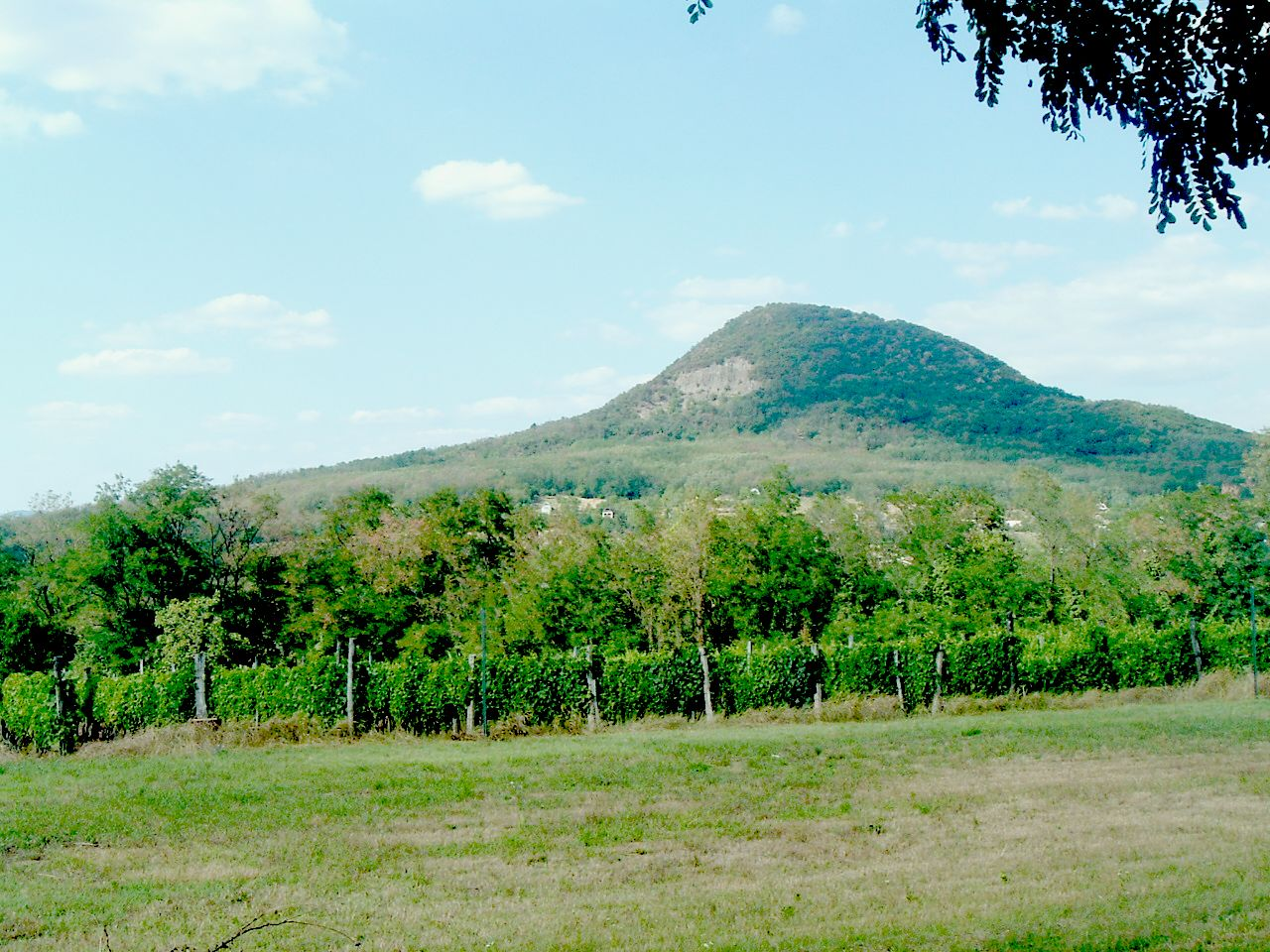

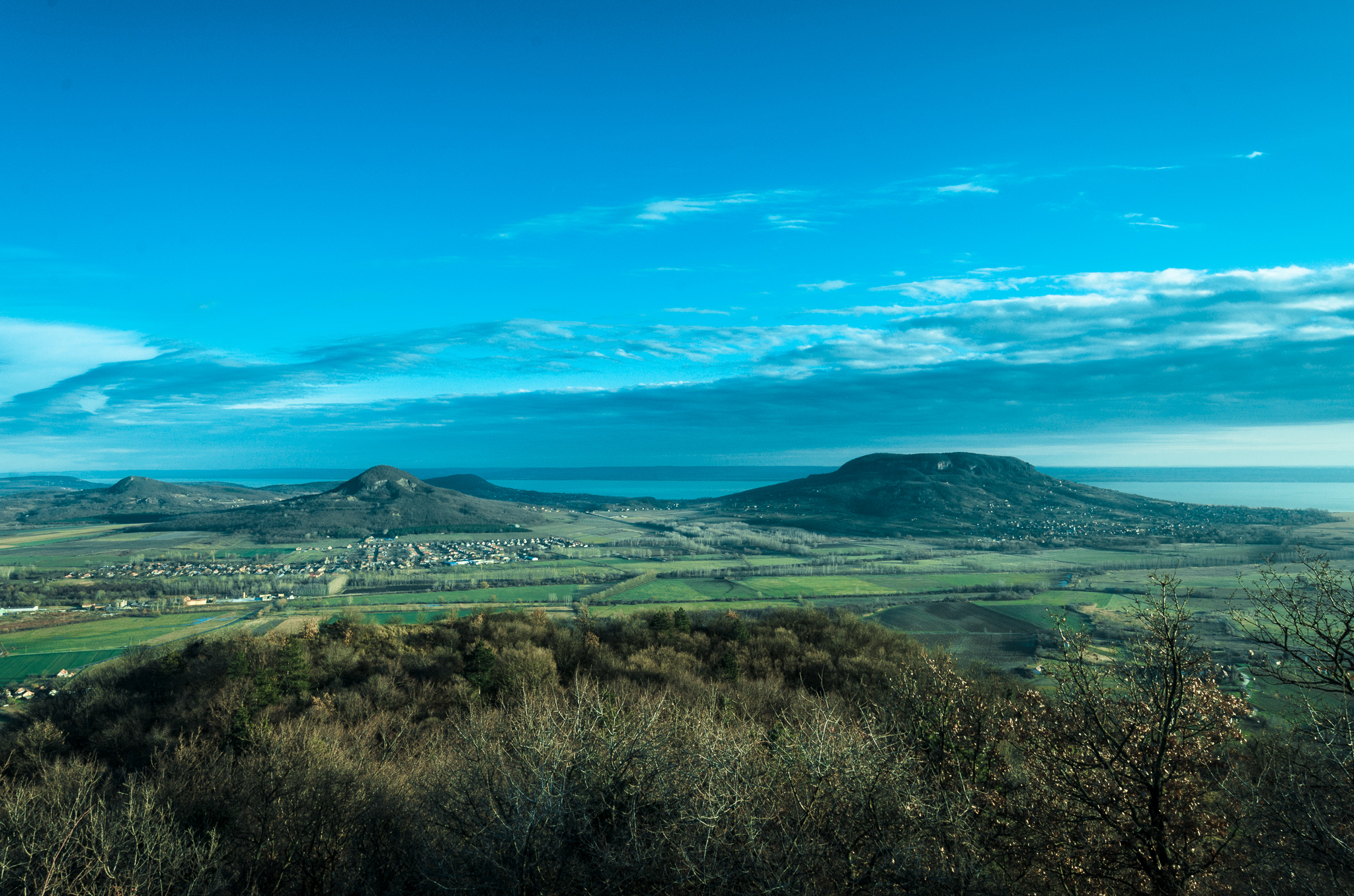

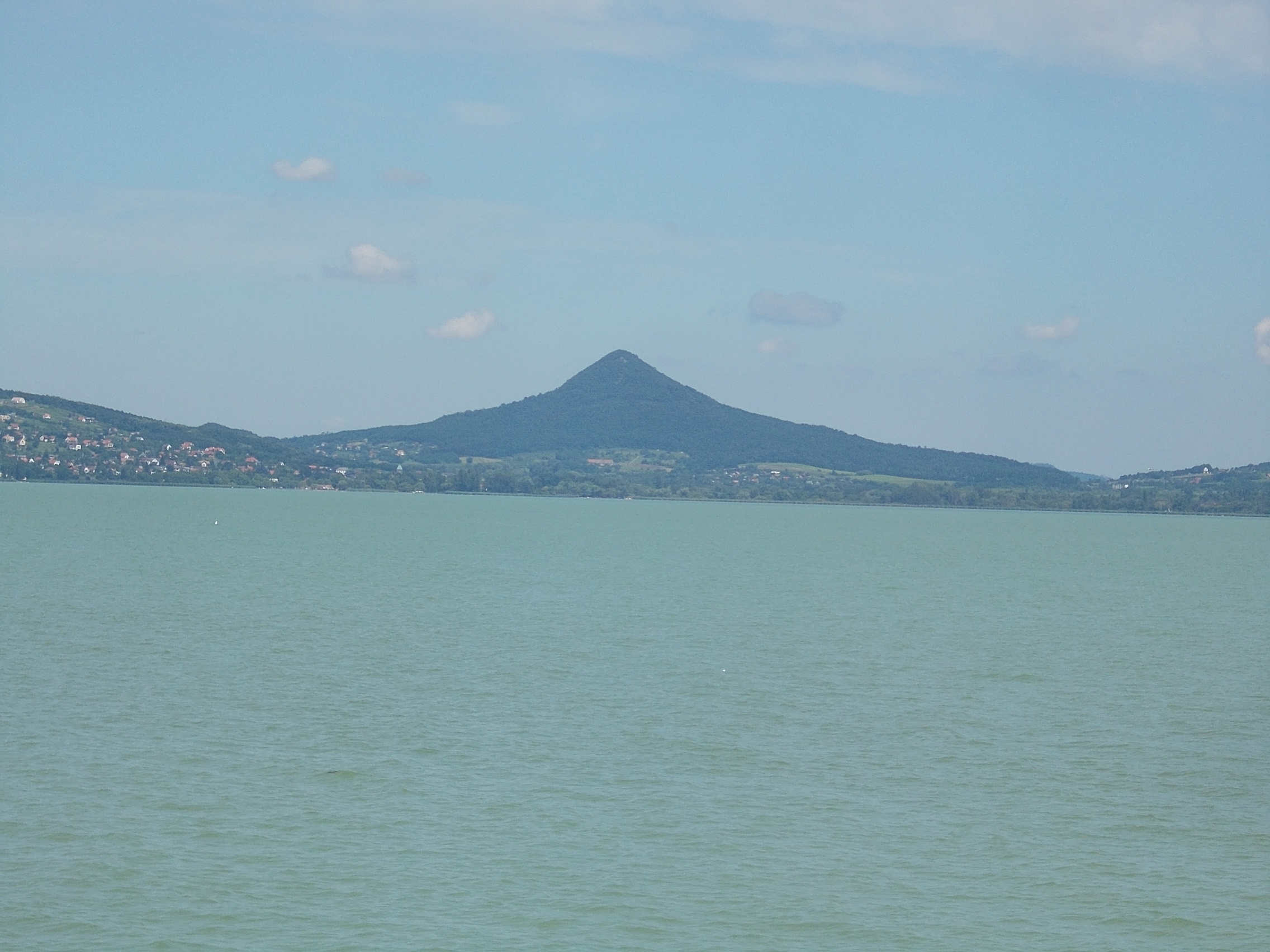

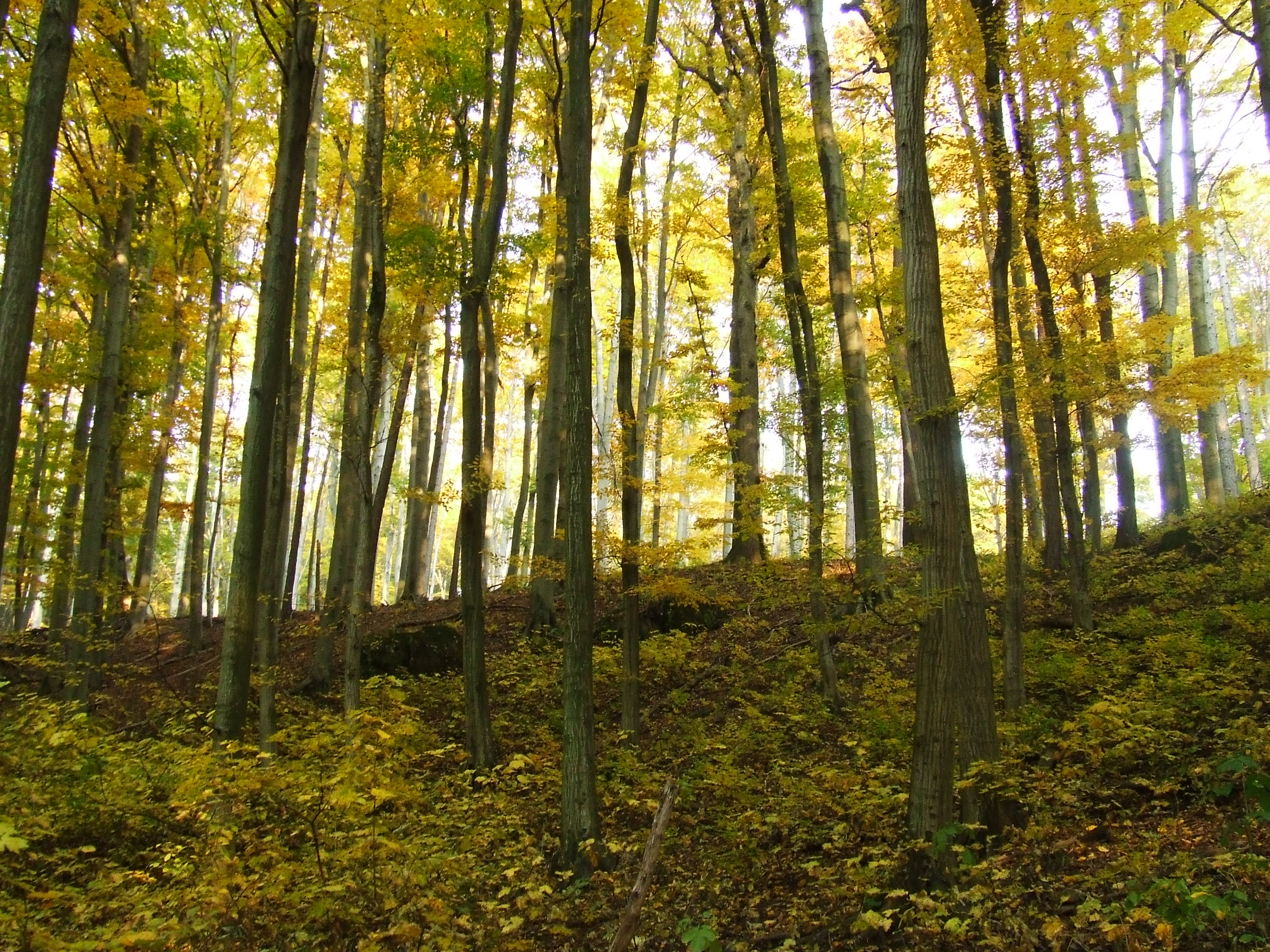

== Sources ==
- https://www.arcanum.hu/hu
- http://www.karpat-medence.hu (In Hungarian)

== See also ==
- Transdanubia
- Geography of Hungary
- Pannonian island mountains
