= Visegrád Mountains =

Mountain range in Hungary

The Visegrád Mountains (Hungarian: Visegrádi-hegység) is a mountain range in Hungary, northwest of Budapest.

== Geography ==
The Visegrád Mountains are the direct northern neighbour of the Pilis Mountains. Although the two ranges form a geographical unit as both of them officially belong to the Transdanubian Mountains, the Visegrád Mountains are connected geologically to Börzsöny and the North Hungarian Mountains. The mountain range is the southernmost part of the Inner Western Carpathians. The basic rock of these mountains is volcanic, mainly andesite, while the Transdanubian Mountains are based on sedimentary rocks.

== Geology ==
Visegrád Mountains were shaped by volcanic events.

== History of the region ==
The whole range served as the hunting area for the medieval kings of Hungary.

== Notable locations ==
The highest peak of the range is at Dobogókő (699 m above sea level), a hiking and ski resort area with a panoramic view on the Danube Bend.

Other notable places include:

- Rám-szakadék
- Thirring-szikla
- Ferenczy-szikla
- Zsivány-szikla
- Urak asztala
- Vadálló-kövek
- Prédikálószék

== Gallery ==
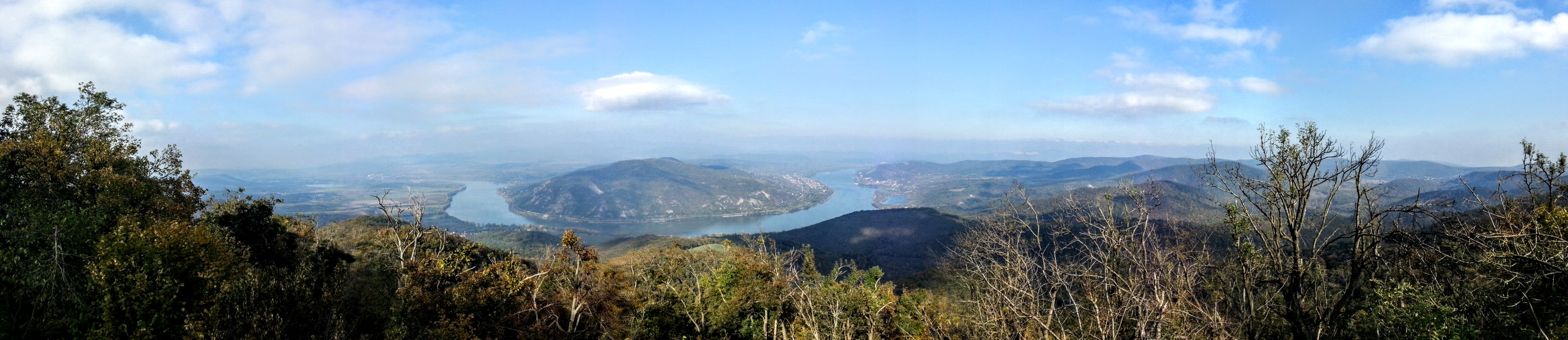

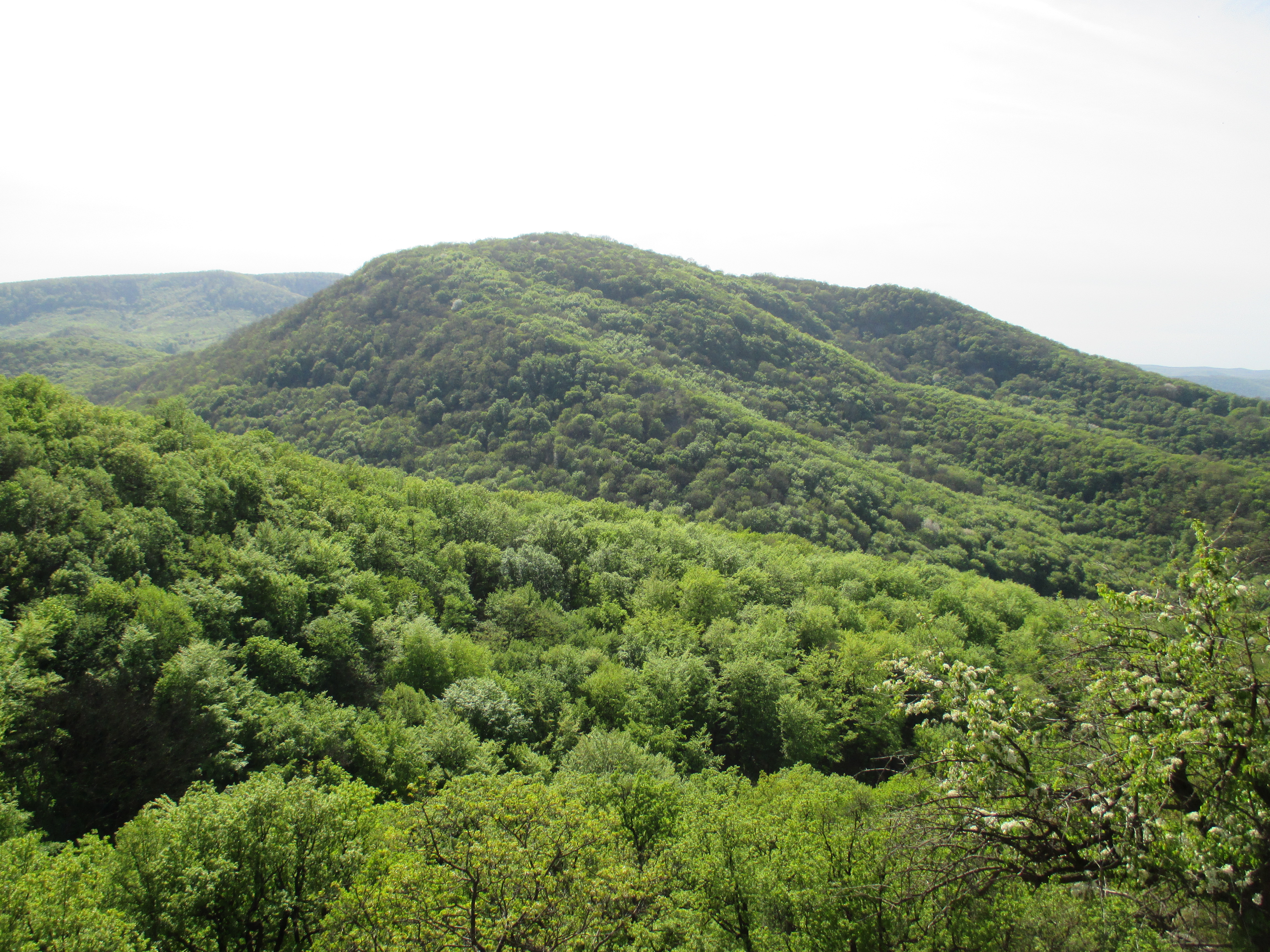

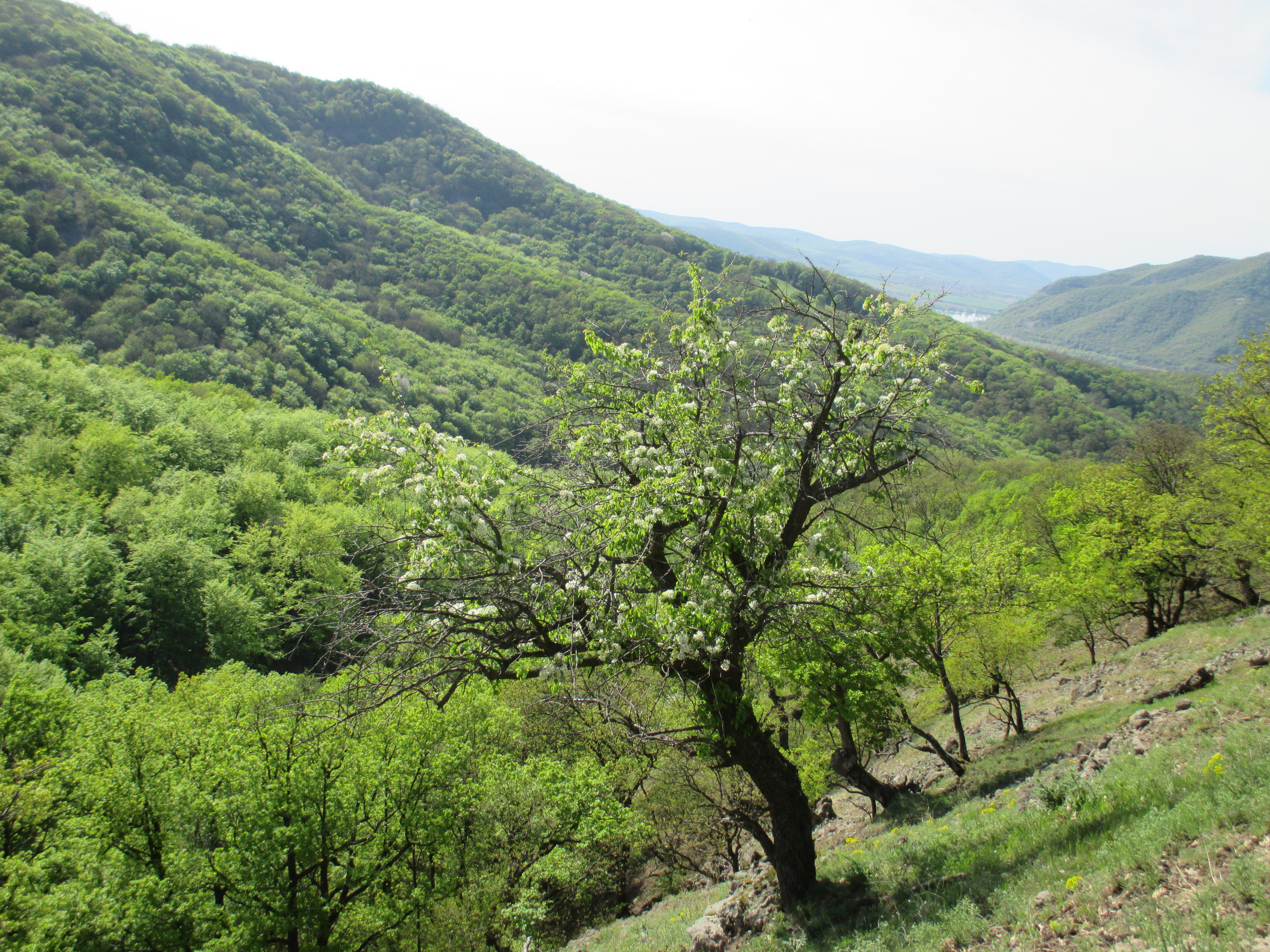

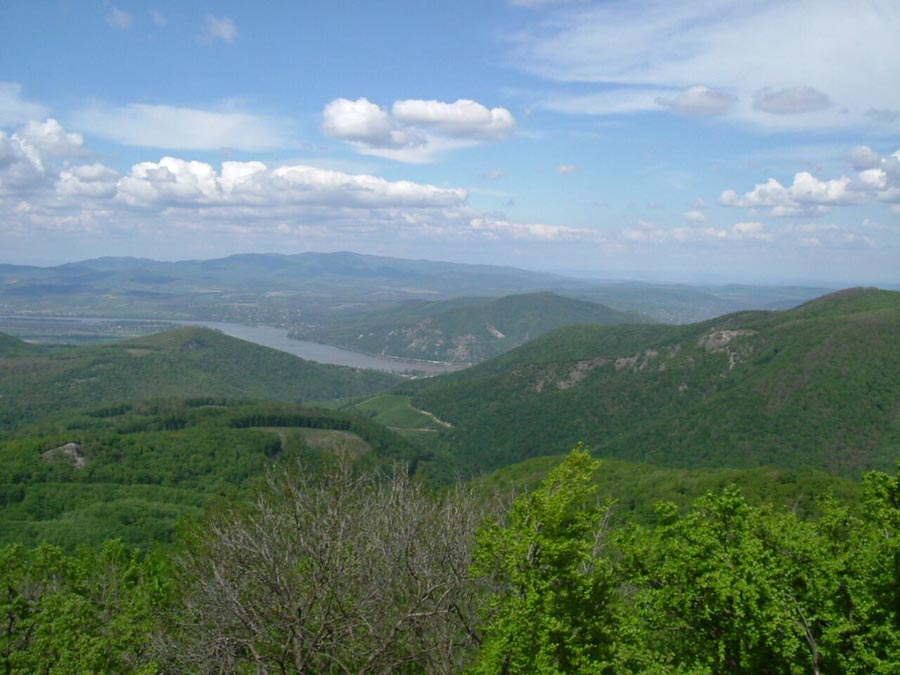

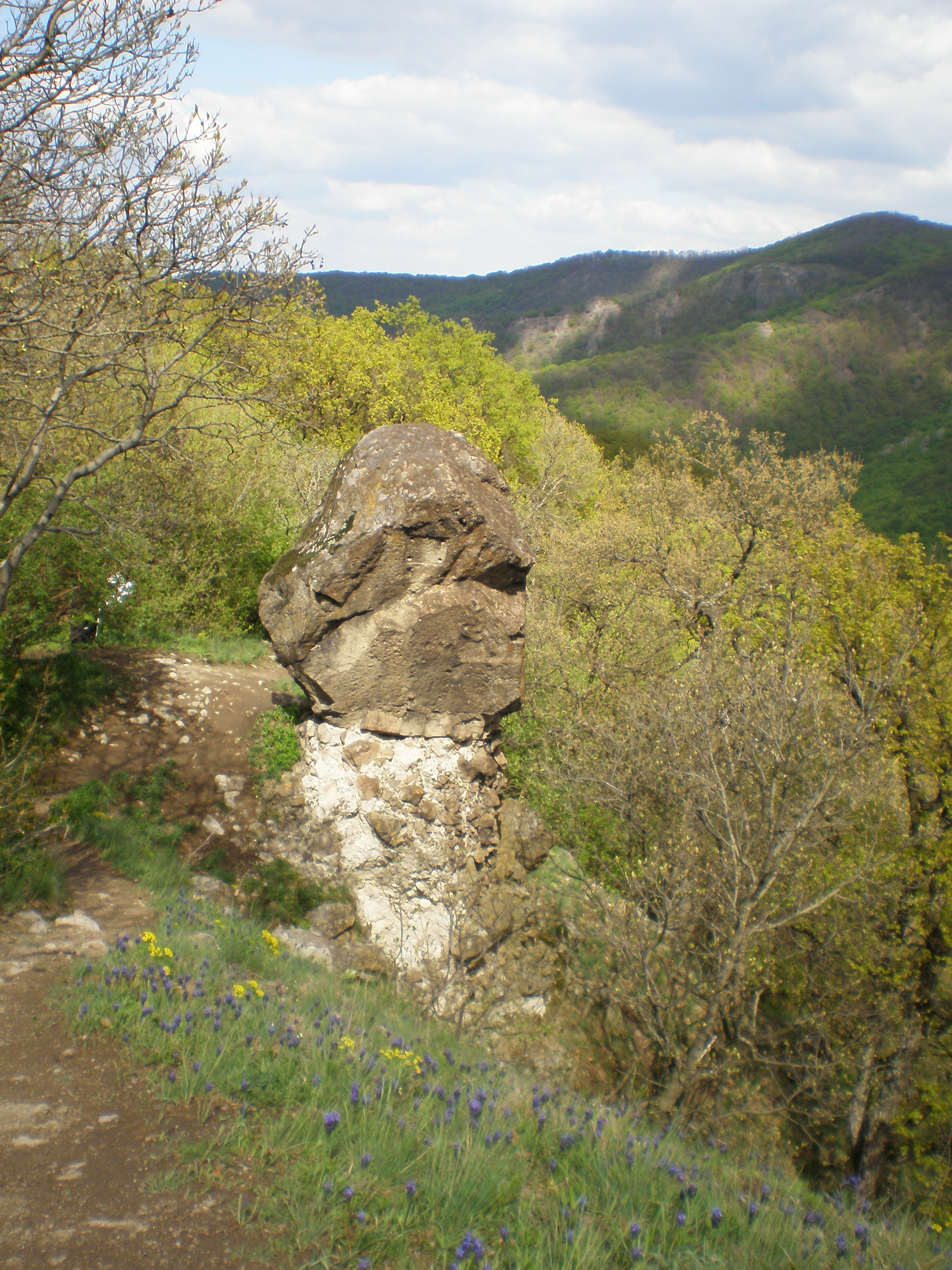

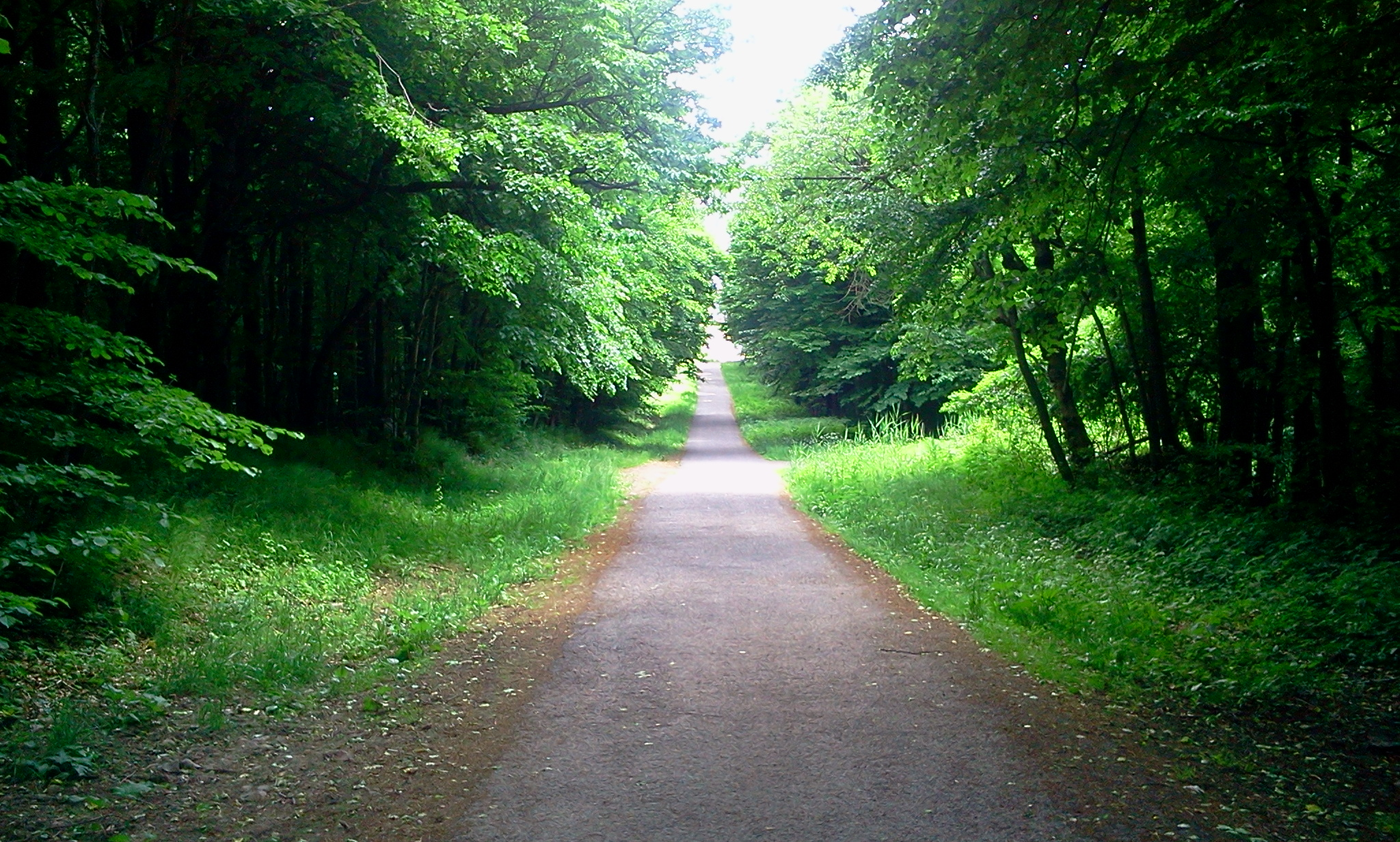
