= Gerecse Mountains =

Mountain range in Hungary

Gerecse
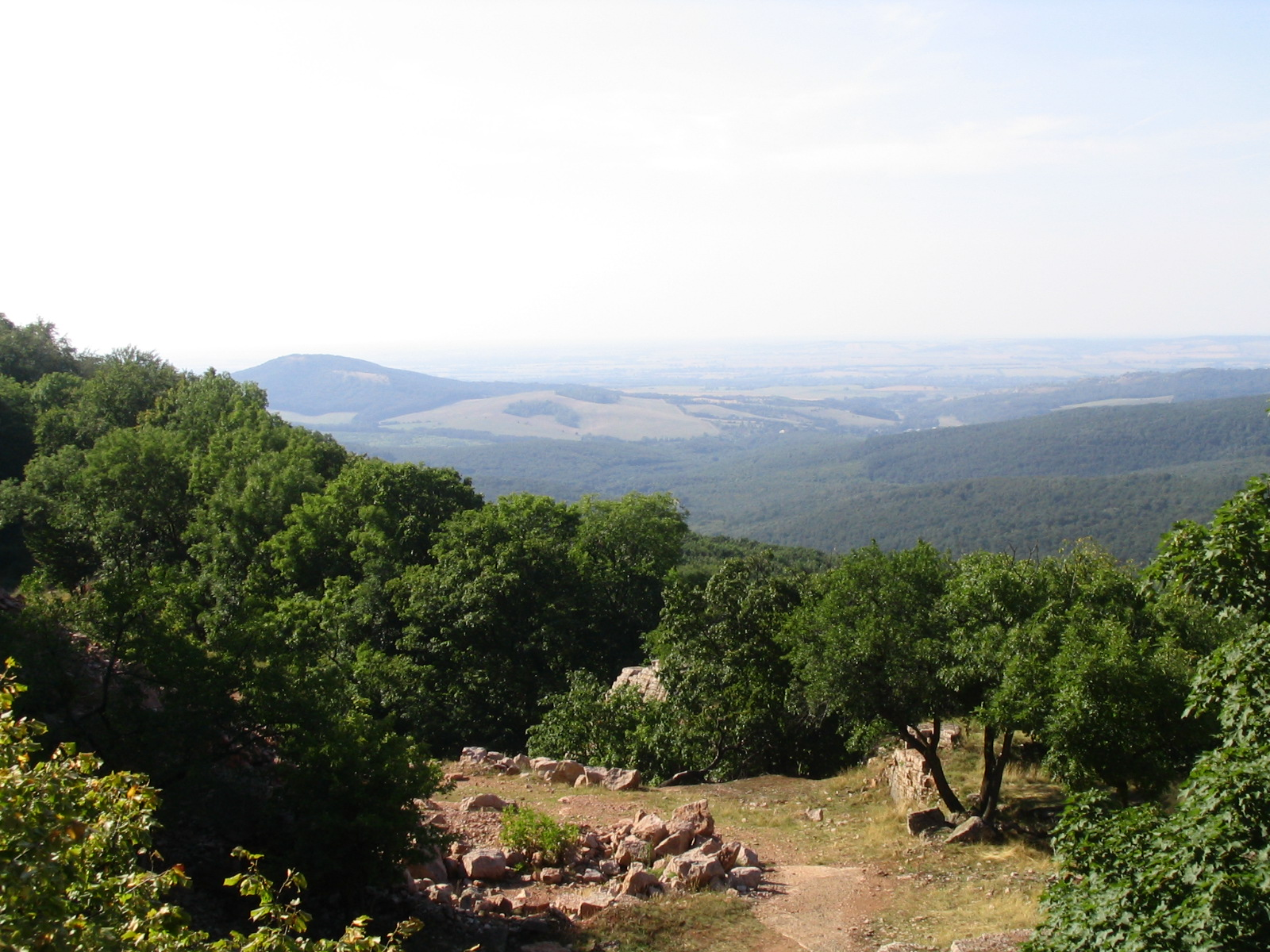

Highest point
- Peak: Nagy-Gerecse
- Elevation: 634 m (2,080 ft)

Dimensions
- Area: 850 km^{2} (330 mi^{2})

Geography
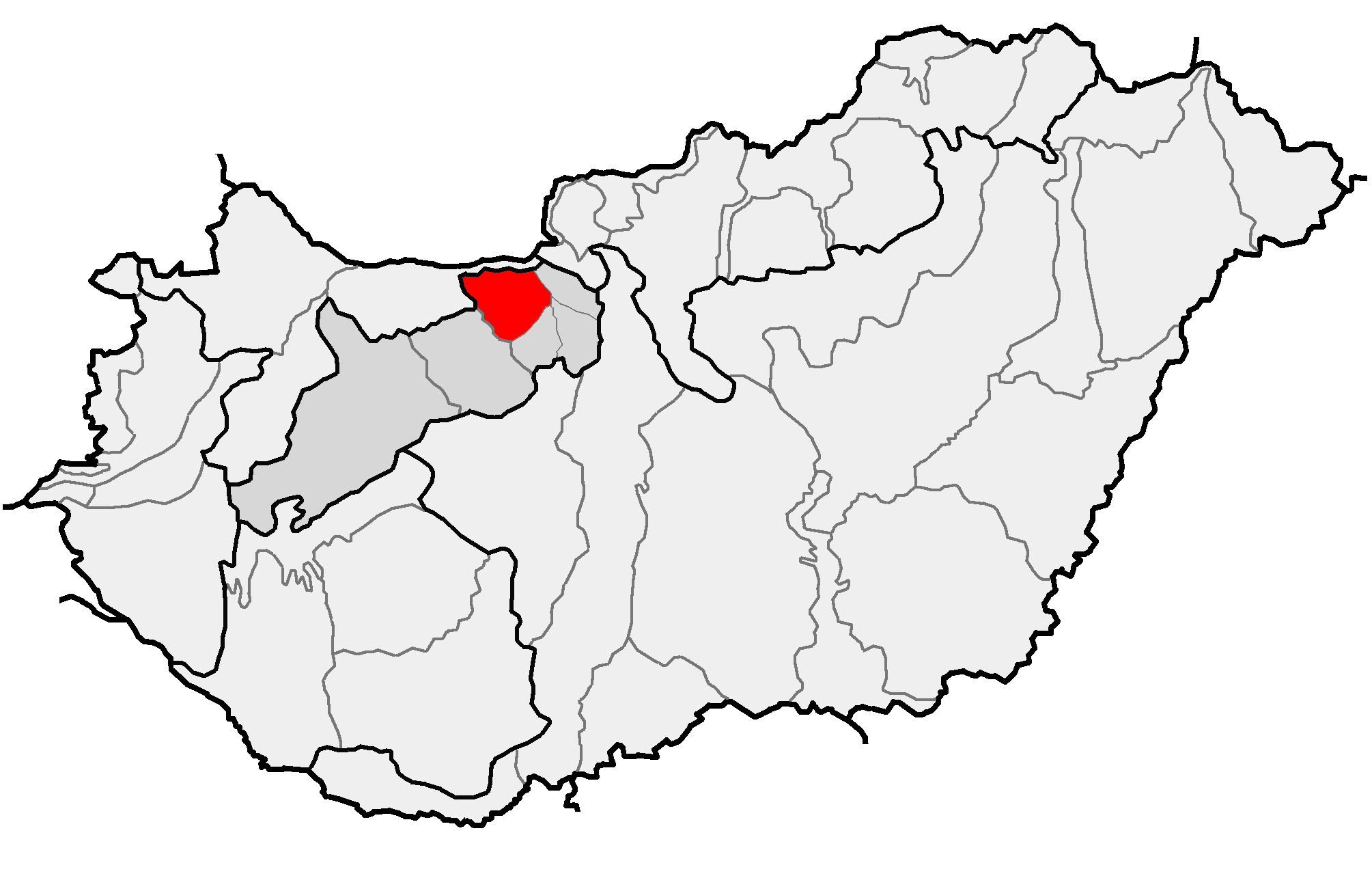
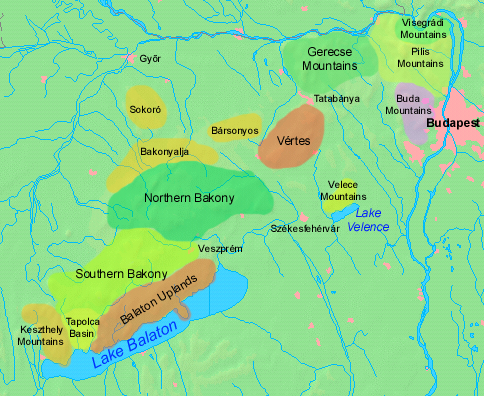
- Location of Gerecse Mountains within physical subdivisions of Hungary Scheme of principal mountain ranges in Transdanubian Mountains and adjacent regions
- Country: Hungary
- County: Komárom-Esztergom County
- Range coordinates: 47°38.6′N 18°24.3′E

Geology
- Orogeny: Transdanubian Mountains
- Rock type(s): chalk, limestone

Gerecse is a mountain range in northwestern Hungary that belongs to the Transdanubian Mountains.

== Geography ==
The range lies in the Central Transdanubian region and connects Vértes Hills with Pilis Mountains in Komárom-Esztergom County, between the town of Tatabánya and the Danube River. Gerecse occupies an area of 850 km^{2} (20,300 ha). The highest point is Nagy-Gerecse at 634 m. The main rock is limestone and chalk.

== Biology ==
Deciduous oak forests cover the lower slopes, with submontane species of Quercus, Carpinus, Fagus, and at higher altitudes karst scrub. The area is 70% forest, 5% scrubland, 10% grassland, and 15% artificial landscapes. Yearly sunshine duration is around 1,980 hours. The average annual temperature above the height of 350 meters is 9.5 C (in January -2,8 C). The average annual precipitation is 640 millimeters.

== Gallery ==
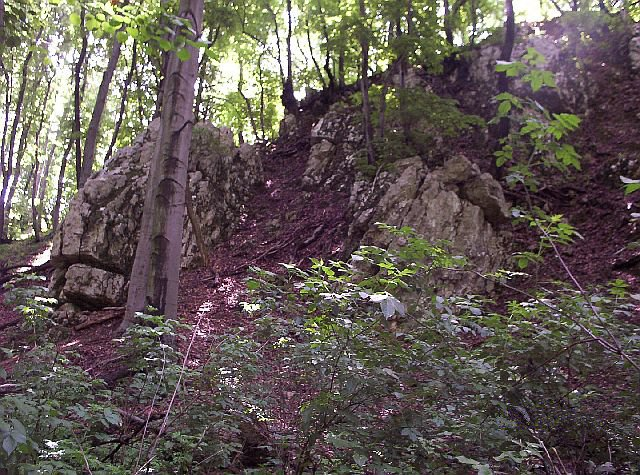
Farkasvölgy (Wolf-valley)

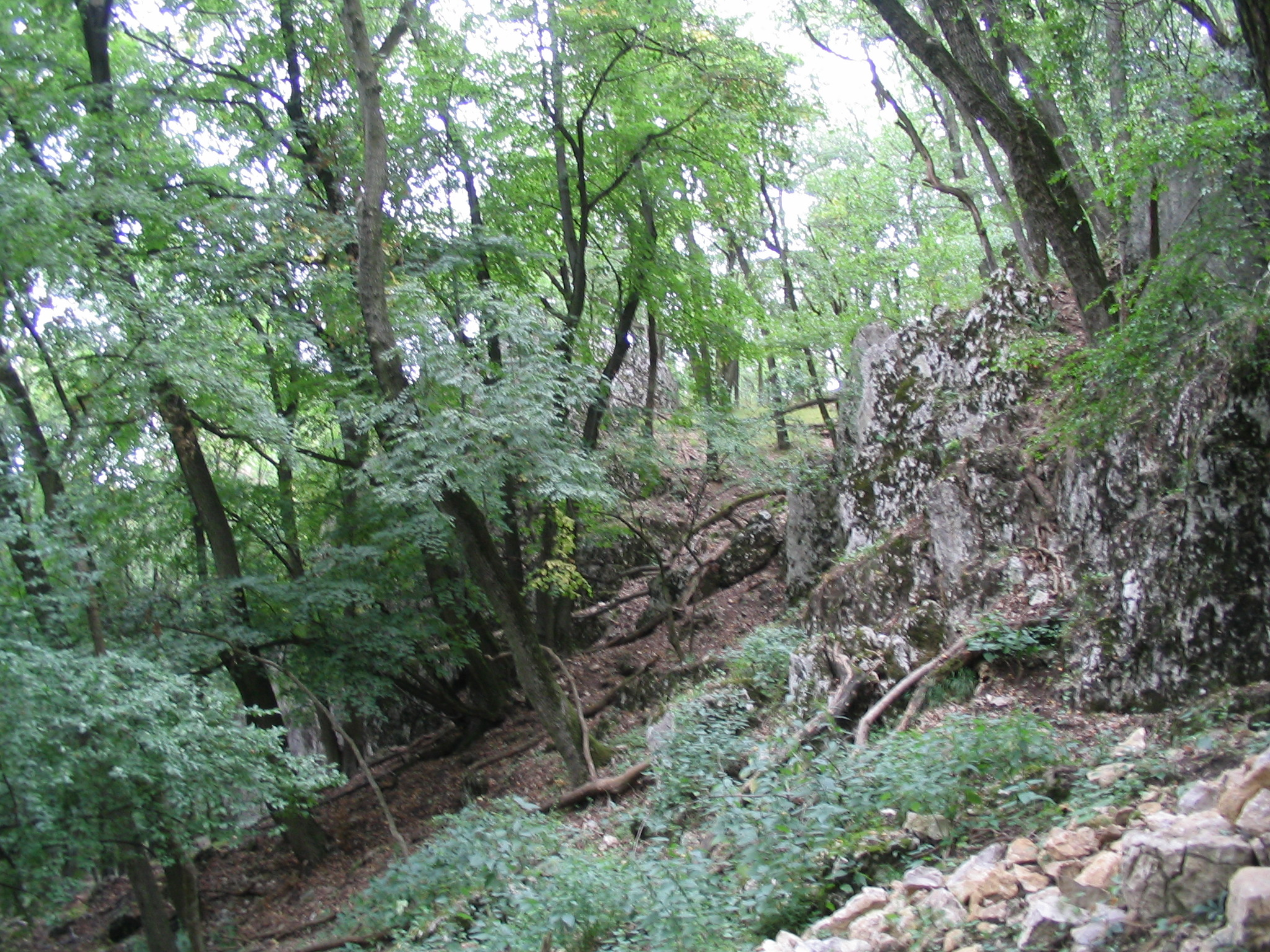
Forest in the Gerecse

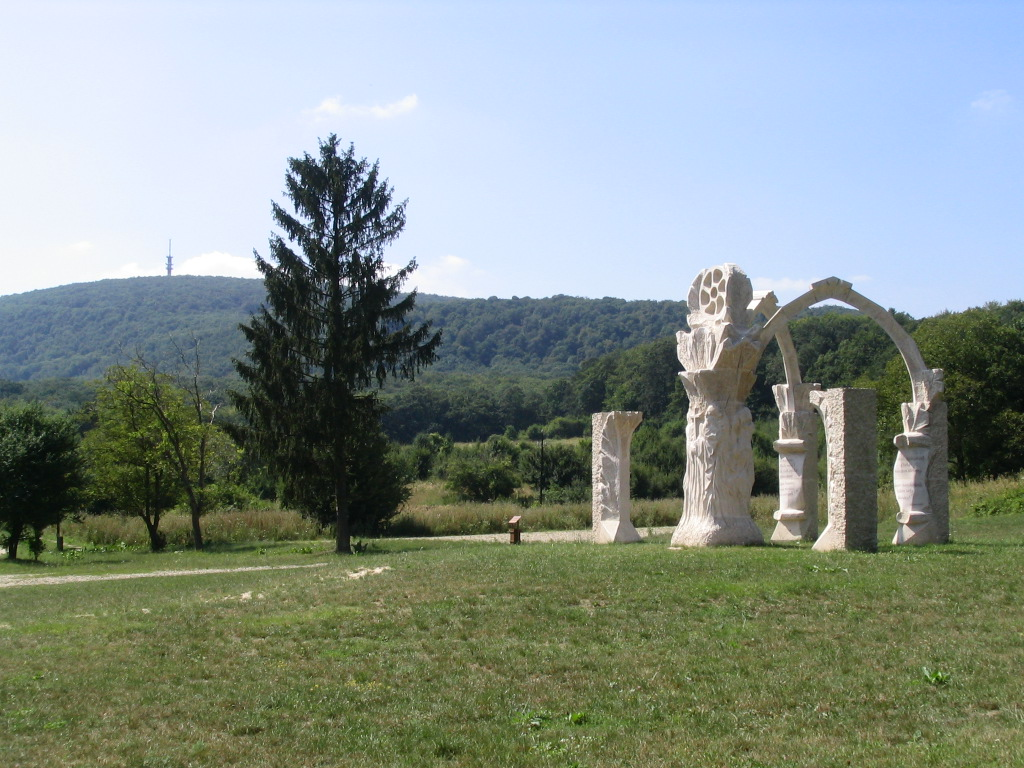
The monument of the Battle of Pusztamarót, 1526

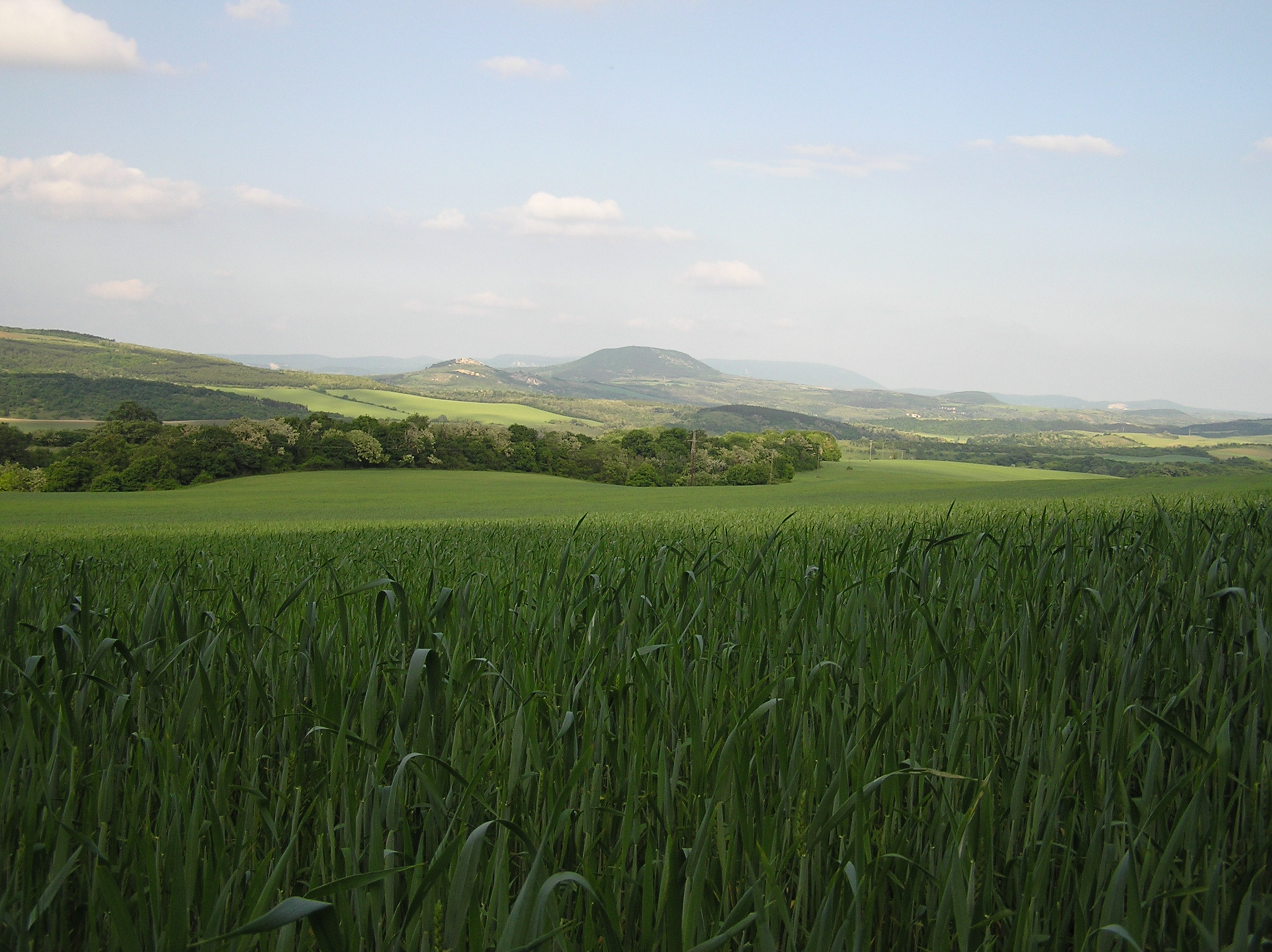
Gerecse near Péliföldszentkereszt

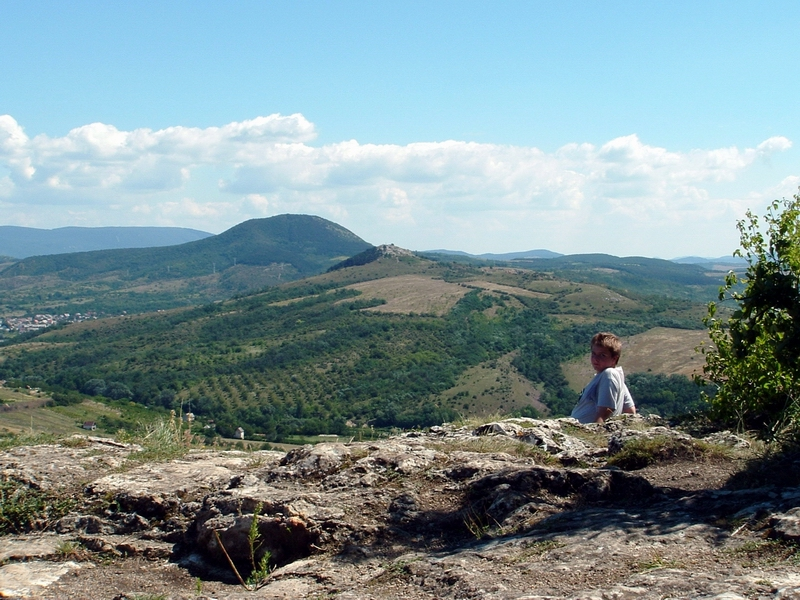

== See also ==
- Transdanubian Mountains
- Geography of Hungary
