= Vértes Hills =

Mountain in Centraltransnubia, Hungary

Vértes
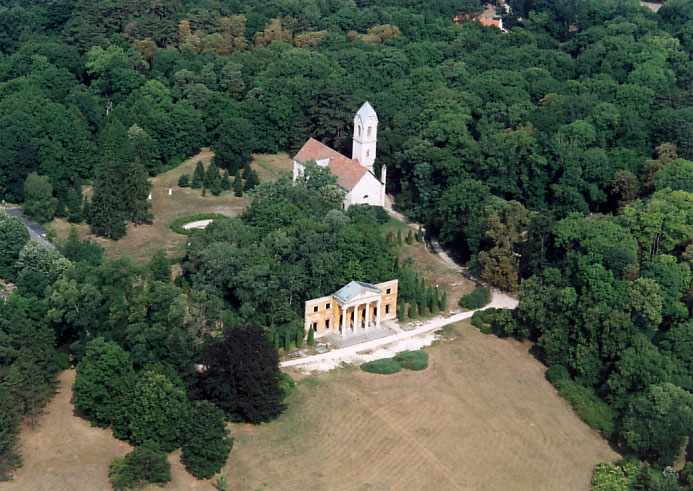

Highest point
- Peak: Nagy-Csákány
- Elevation: 487 m (1,598 ft)

Geography
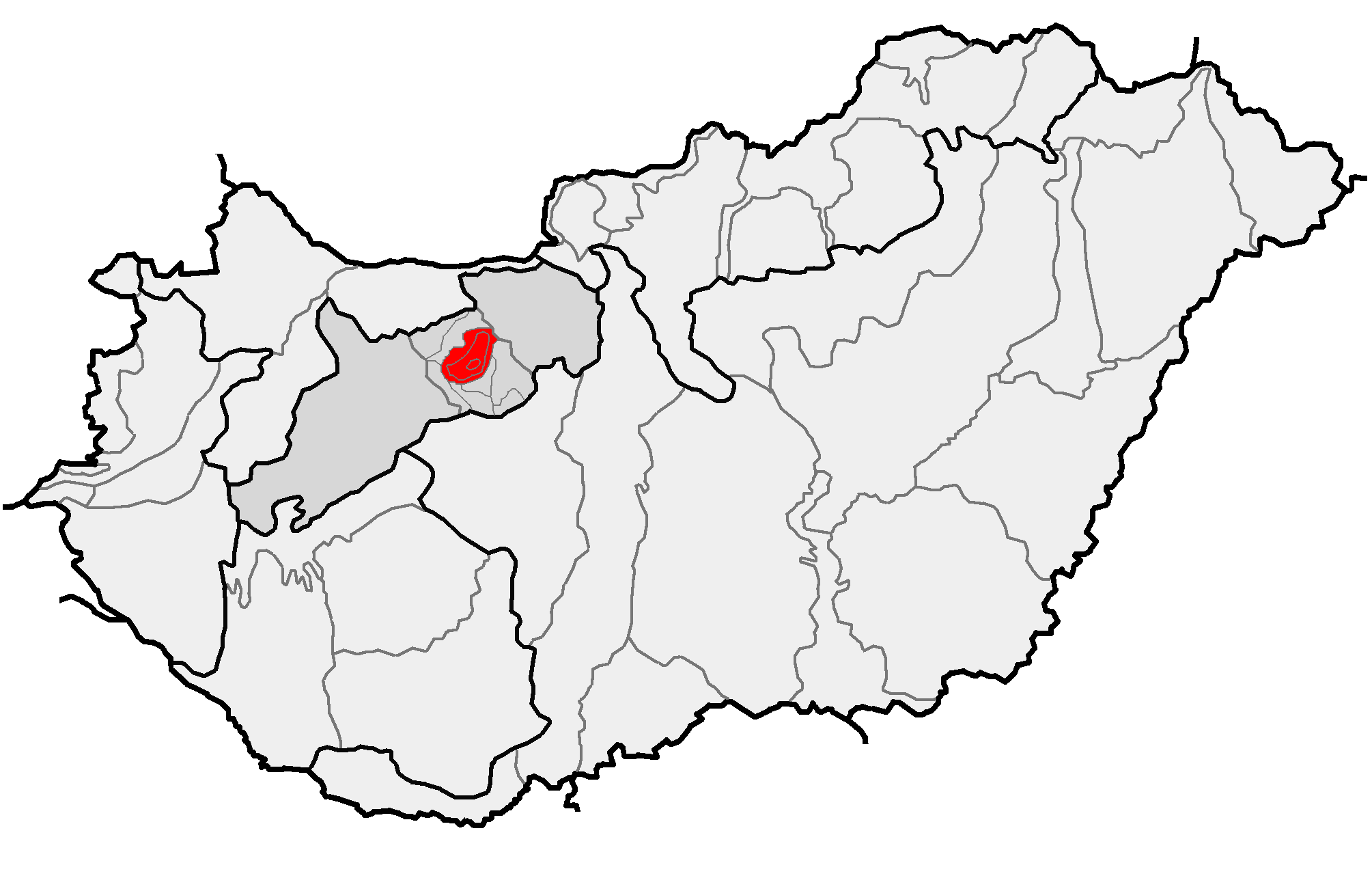
- Country: Hungary
- Counties: Fejér County and Komárom-Esztergom County
- Range coordinates: 47°24′N 18°20′E

Geology
- Orogeny: Transdanubian Mountains
- Rock type: Dolomite

Vértes is a mountain range in north-western Hungary, in the Central Transdanubian region, between the ranges Bakony and Gerecse. The Vértes Mountains are part of the Transdanubian Mountains.

== Geography ==
The area of the Vértes occupies 314 km^{2} (121 sq mi). It is about 30 km long and 10–15 km wide. The average altitude is above sea level is 350 meters; its highest points are 487 m (Nagy-Csákány), 480 m (Körtvélyes) and 479 m (Csóka-hegy). Geologically the Vértes constitute a fairly uniform structure. On the surface of the entire mountain there are no older rocks than those of the mid-Triassic. The main rock is dolomite—CaMg(CO_{3})_{2}—from the upper Triassic. All the layers are ancient marine deposits.

The Vértes possesses a well-developed valley network (1260 km), but in spite of this spring and rivers are very rare in the mountain. Yearly sunshine duration is around 1950–2000 hours. The average annual temperature above the height of 350 meters is 8.5 °C (in January, −3 °C). The average annual precipitation is between 600 and 700 millimeters. In winter the land is usually snow-covered.

== History ==
According to a legend documented in mediaeval Hungarian chronicles, the Vértes mountains were named after a historical incident: during the unsuccessful campaign of 1051–1052, the withdrawing German troops of Henry III, emperor of the Holy Roman Empire, scattered their armours to ease their escape through the mountains; hence the name Vértes (cf. vért, Hungarian for armour).

== Gallery ==
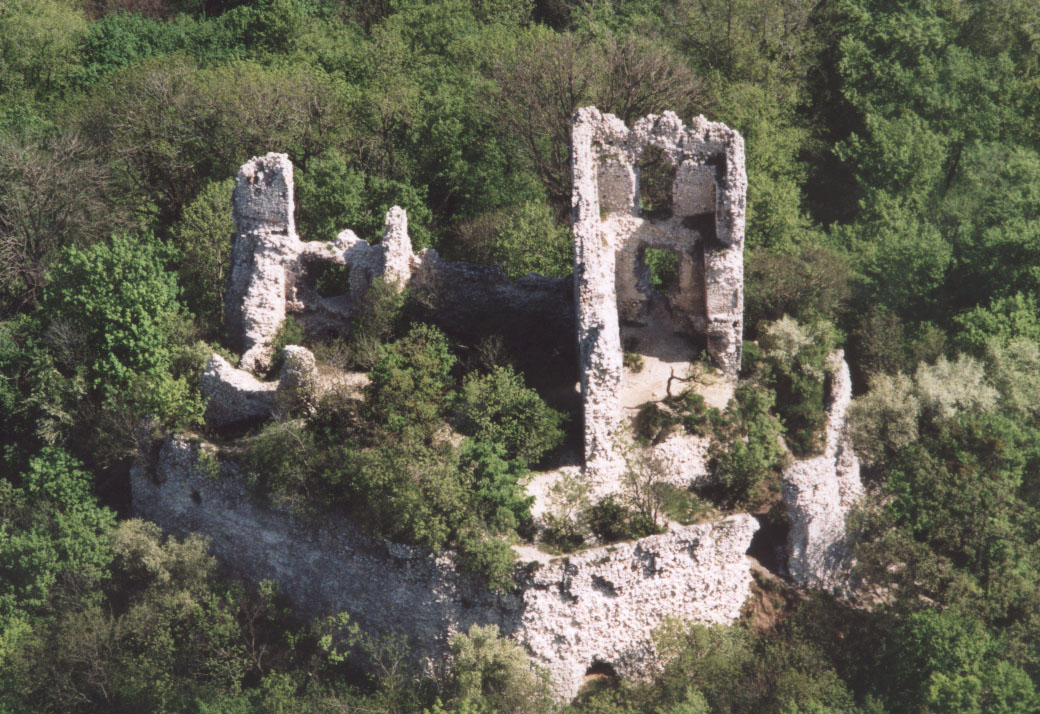
Vitány castle

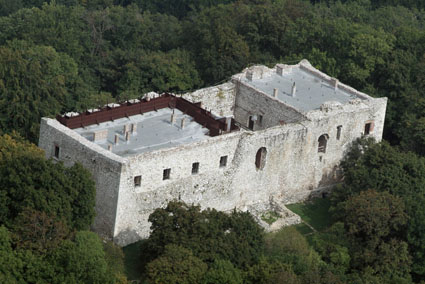
Várgesztes castle

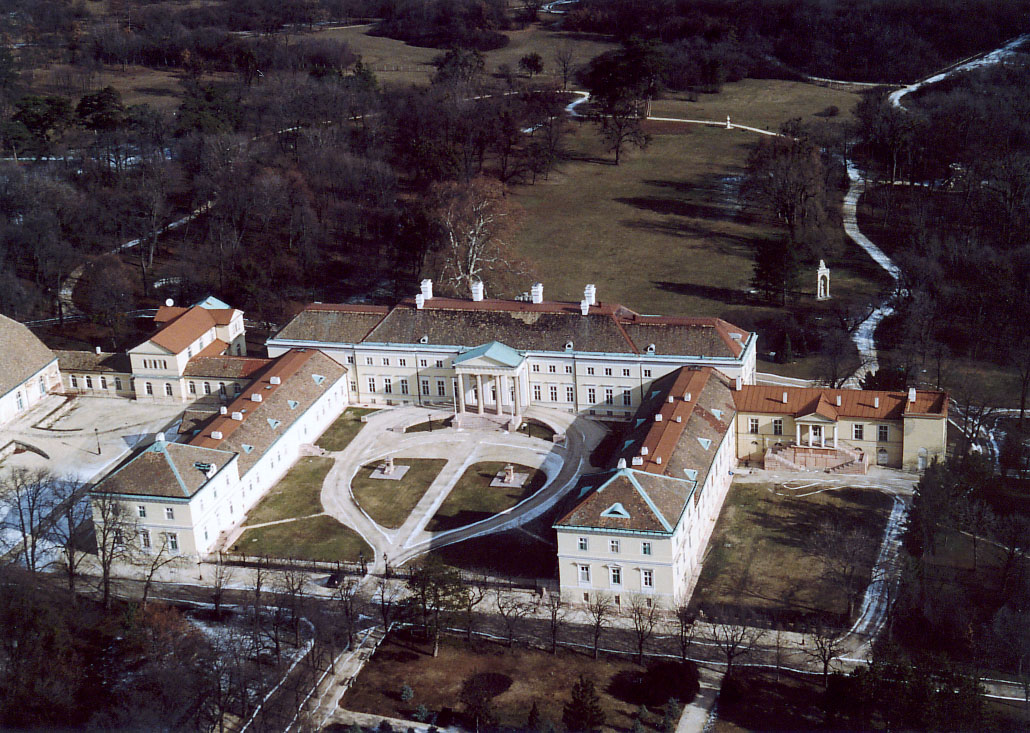
Csákvár

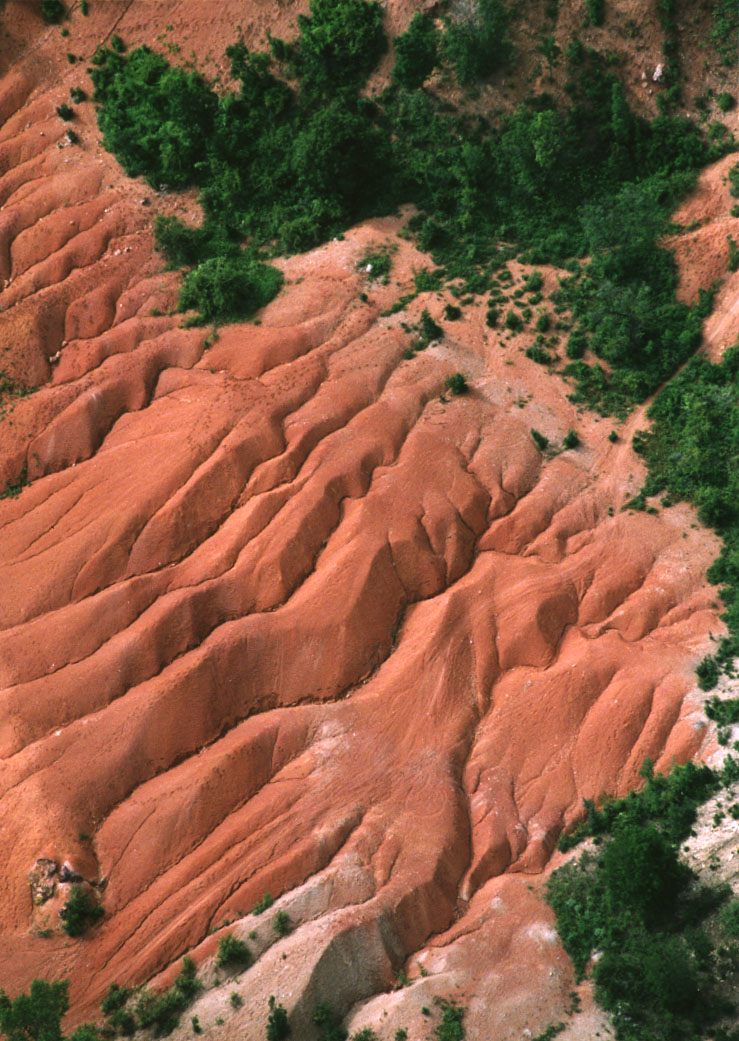
Gánt - bauxite mine

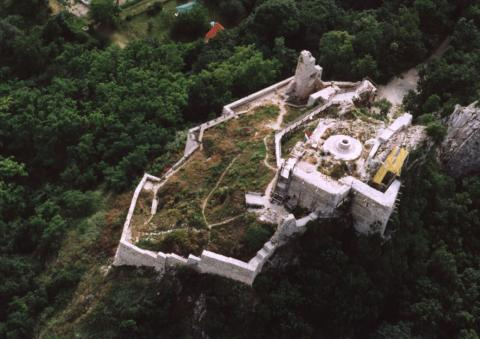
Csókakő

== Sources ==
Béni Kornél–Viszló Levente: A Vértes hegység és környéke, 1996 ISBN 963-04-6683-X

== See also ==
- Transdanubian Mountains
- Geography of Hungary
