= Pilisszentkereszt =

Pilisszentkereszt Mlynky
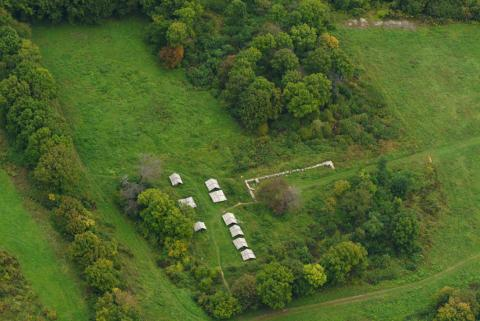
- The ruins of the Cistercian abbey from the air

- Location within Hungary
- Coordinates: 47°42′N 18°54′E
- Country: Hungary
- County: Pest

Area
  - Total: 17.21 km^{2} (6.64 sq mi)

Population (2007)
  - Total: 2,275
  - Density: 124.8/km^{2} (323/sq mi)
- Time zone: UTC+1 (CET)
  - Summer (DST): UTC+2 (CEST)
- Postal code: 2098
- Area code: 26

Pilisszentkereszt (Slovak: Mlynky) is a village in Pest County, Budapest metropolitan area, Hungary, some 20 km from Budapest in the Pilis Mountains. Pilis Szent-Kereszt means "St. Cross in Pilis".

== History ==
The territory of Pilisszentkereszt and the surrounding lands were inhabited in the prehistoric times, living in the nearby caves, but later they left the area. During the Roman times logging was common in the nearby woods.

The village was established by Hungarians in the 12th century around a Cistercian abbey, which itself was established at May 27, 1184. The abbey, as well as the village was destroyed during the Turkish occupation of the region, in an attack at September 7, 1526. Some Benedictines may have lived here after the attack, until about 1541, when they finally left the uttering Turkish rule. After the reconquista of Ottoman Hungary, in 1747, a group of Slovak migrants arrived at the scene to reestablish it, from neighbouring Pilisszántó. Later more Slovaks arrived from all around the Kingdom of Hungary, but many left in 1782. To fill the gaps, some German (mainly Swabian) settlers arrived in 1785.

In the 2001 census, 54.6% of the total population (or approximately 1,170 people) declared themselves ethnic Slovaks, making the village the only settlement in Hungary where ethnic Slovaks are forming a majority.
