= Pilis Mountains =

Mountain range in Hungary

Coordinates: 47.7319°N 18.9185°E

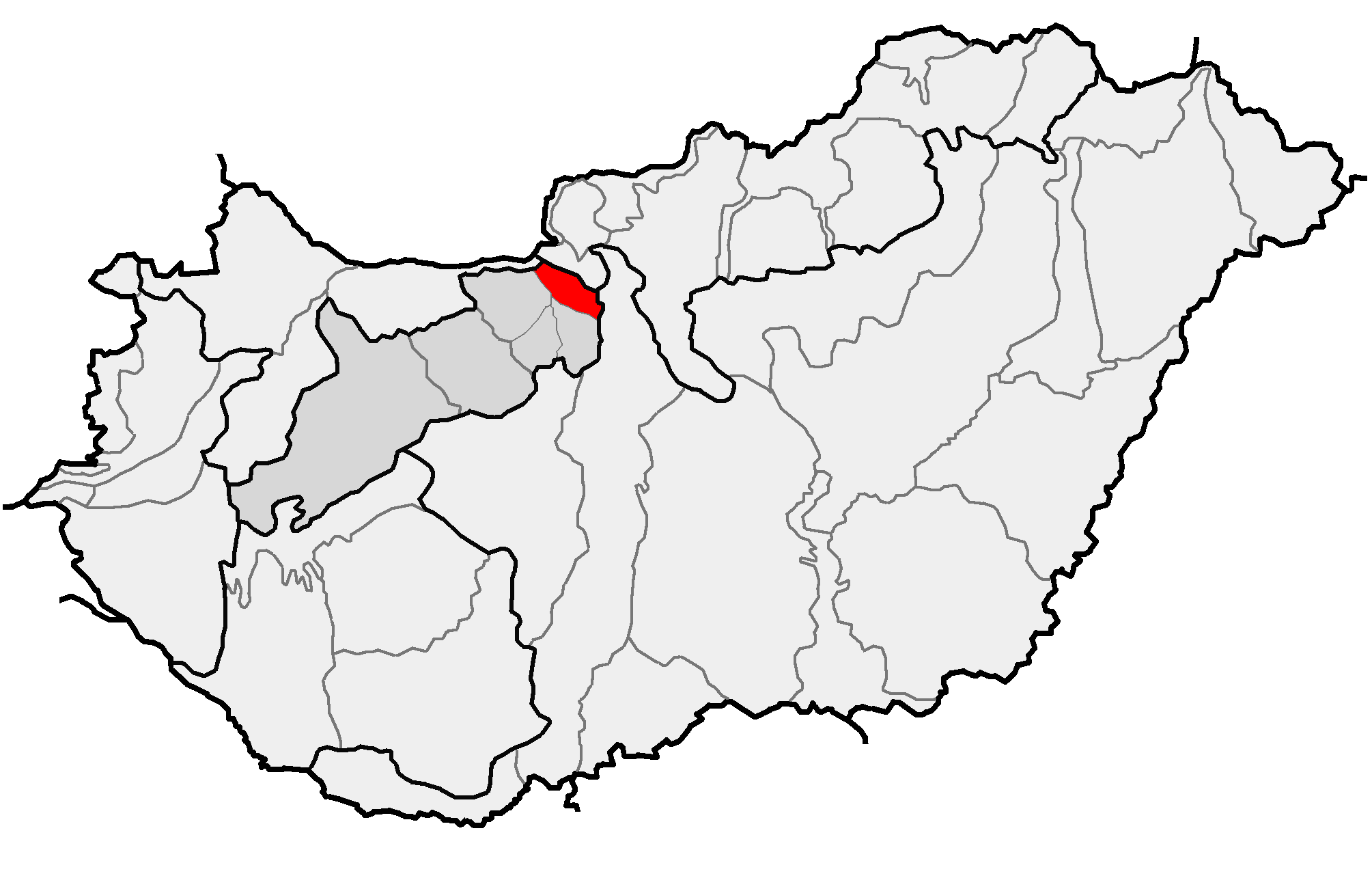
Location of Pilis Mountains within physical subdivisions of Hungary

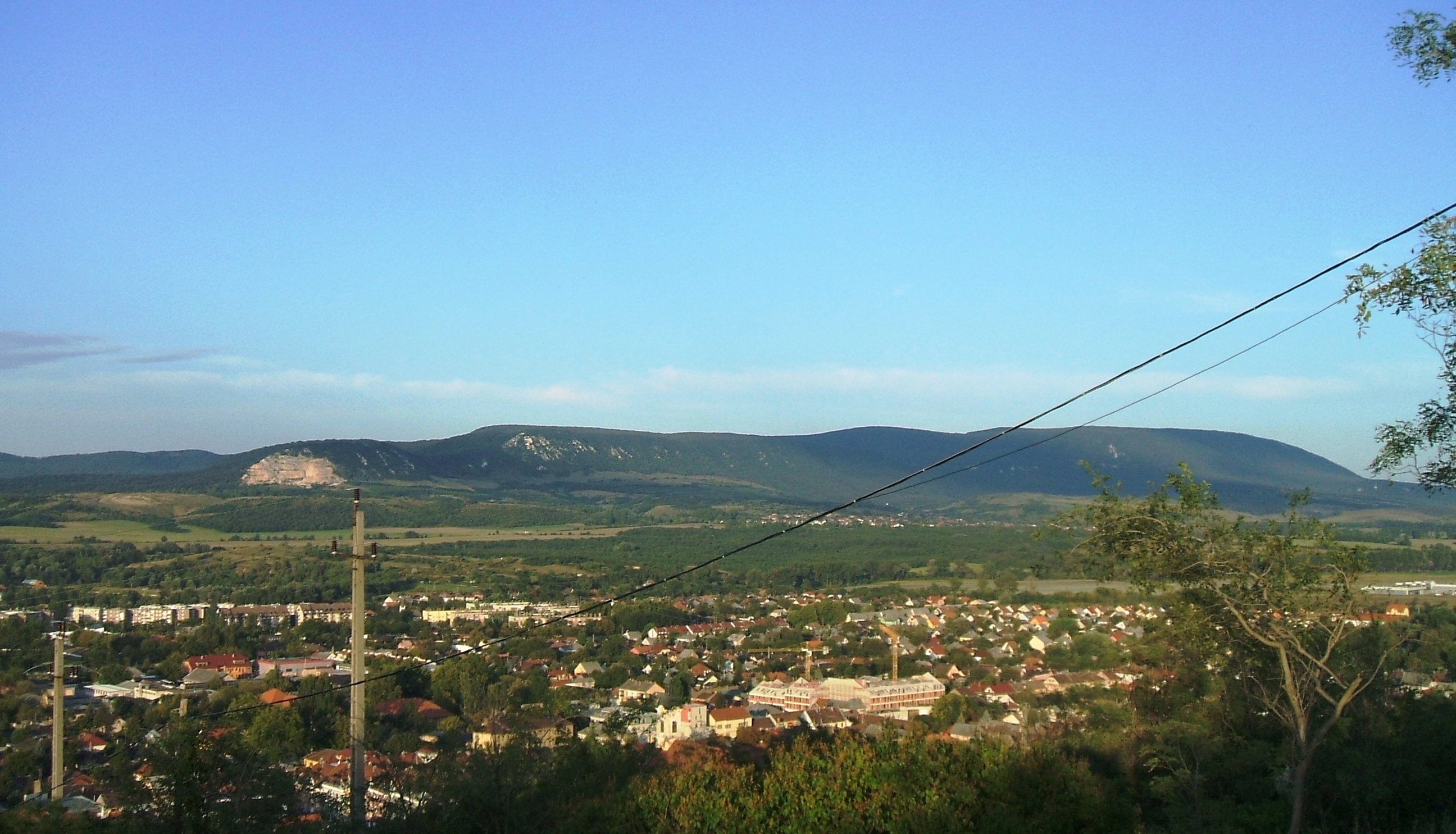
Pilis Mountains as seen from Dorog

Pilis Mountains is a mountainous region in the Transdanubian Mountains. Its highest peak is Pilis-tető at 756 meters (2,480 ft). It is a popular hiking destination in Hungary.

It is the direct southern neighbour of the Visegrád Mountains which are based on volcanic rocks while Pilis is sedimentary.

== History of the region ==
The region used to be a hunting area for the mediaeval kings of Hungary. Numerous hunting lodges have survived. One of the most frequented areas was around the village Pilisszentkereszt.

== Mountains of the range ==
- Pilis Summit, the second highest point of Transdanubia.
- Kevélyek Range
- Csikóváralja
