= Glashütten =

Glashütten is the name of the following places:

In Germany:

- Glashütten, Bavaria, a municipality of Bayreuth, Bavaria
- Glashütten (Taunus), a municipality of Hochtaunuskreis, Hesse
- Glashütten, a district in the municipality of Illmensee in Baden-Württemberg
- Glashütten, a district in the municipality of Hirzenhain in Hesse

In Austria:

- Glashütten bei Langeck, a part of Lockenhaus, Oberpullendorf, Burgenland
- Glashütten bei Schlaining, a hamlet in Unterkohlstätten, Oberwart, Burgenland
- Glashütten, a village and part of Alland, Baden, Lower Austria
- Glashütten, a village in the community of Liebenau, Freistadt, Upper Austria
- Glashütten, a village in the community of Reichenau im Mühlkreis, Urfahr-Umgebung, Upper Austria
- Glashütten, a village in the community of Gressenberg, Deutschlandsberg, Styria

In Switzerland:

- Glashütten, a hamlet in the municipality of Murgenthal, Canton Aargau

In Slovakia:

- Glashütten, German name for the municipality Sklené Teplice, Banská Bystrica Region
