= Sopron Mountains =

Coordinates: 47°39′05″N 16°27′44″E

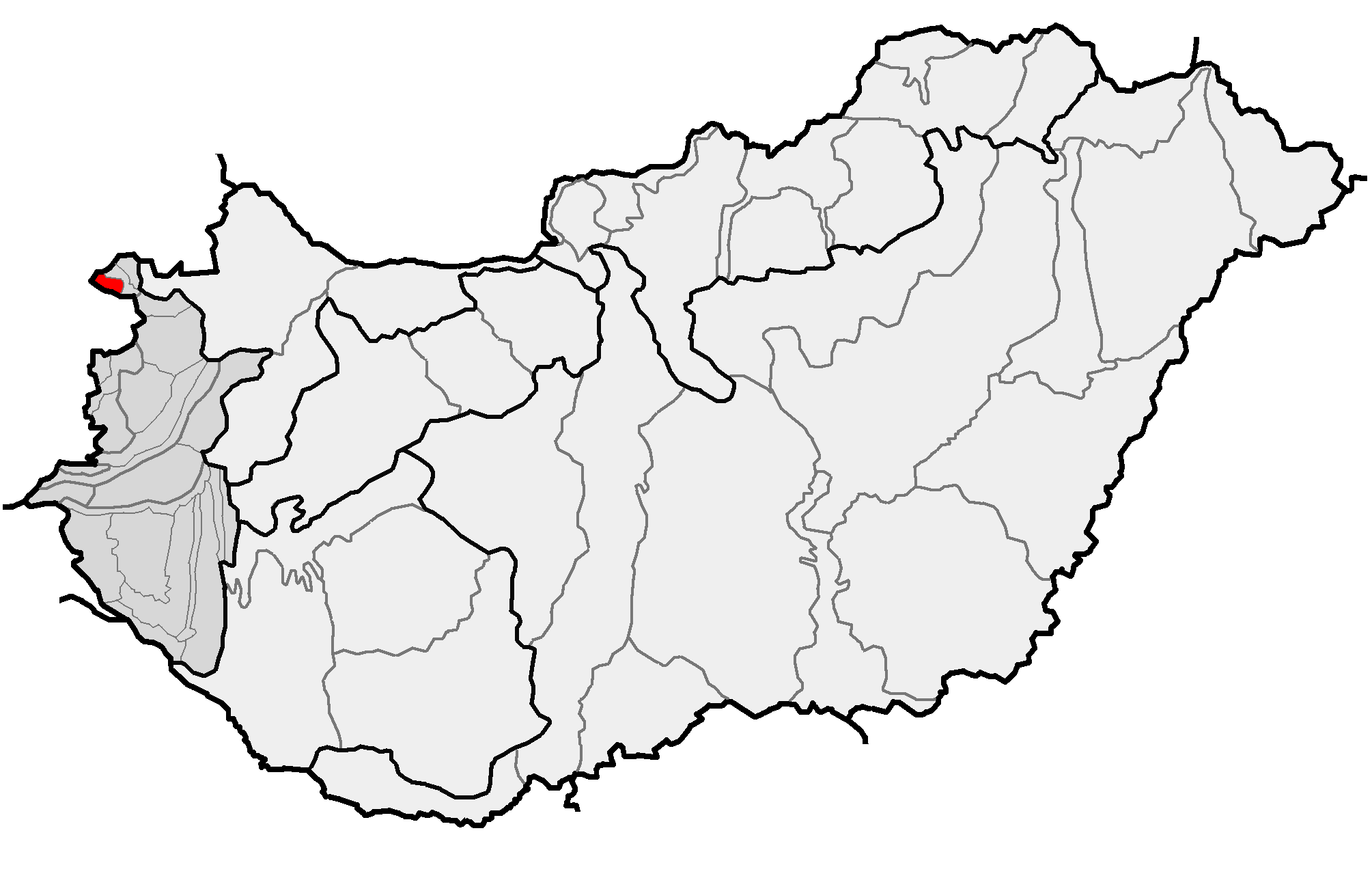
Sopron Mountains (in red) within physical subdivisions of Hungary

The Sopron Mountains (Hungarian: Soproni-hegység, Soproni-hg., German: Ödenburger Gebirge), occasionally also called the Ödenburg Mountains, is a low mountain range which forms the eastward extension of the Eastern Alps in Europe. It is part of the Alpokalja area of Hungary and also of the Burgenland. It is located close to the city of Sopron in western Hungary. Its highest point is the Brenntenriegel, at 606 metres above sea level.

== See also ==
- Geography of Hungary
- Rosalia Mountains (Hungarian: Rozália-hegység)
- Alpokalja
