= Glashütten bei Schlaining =

Glashütten bei Schlaining Szalónakhuta
- dependent hamlet
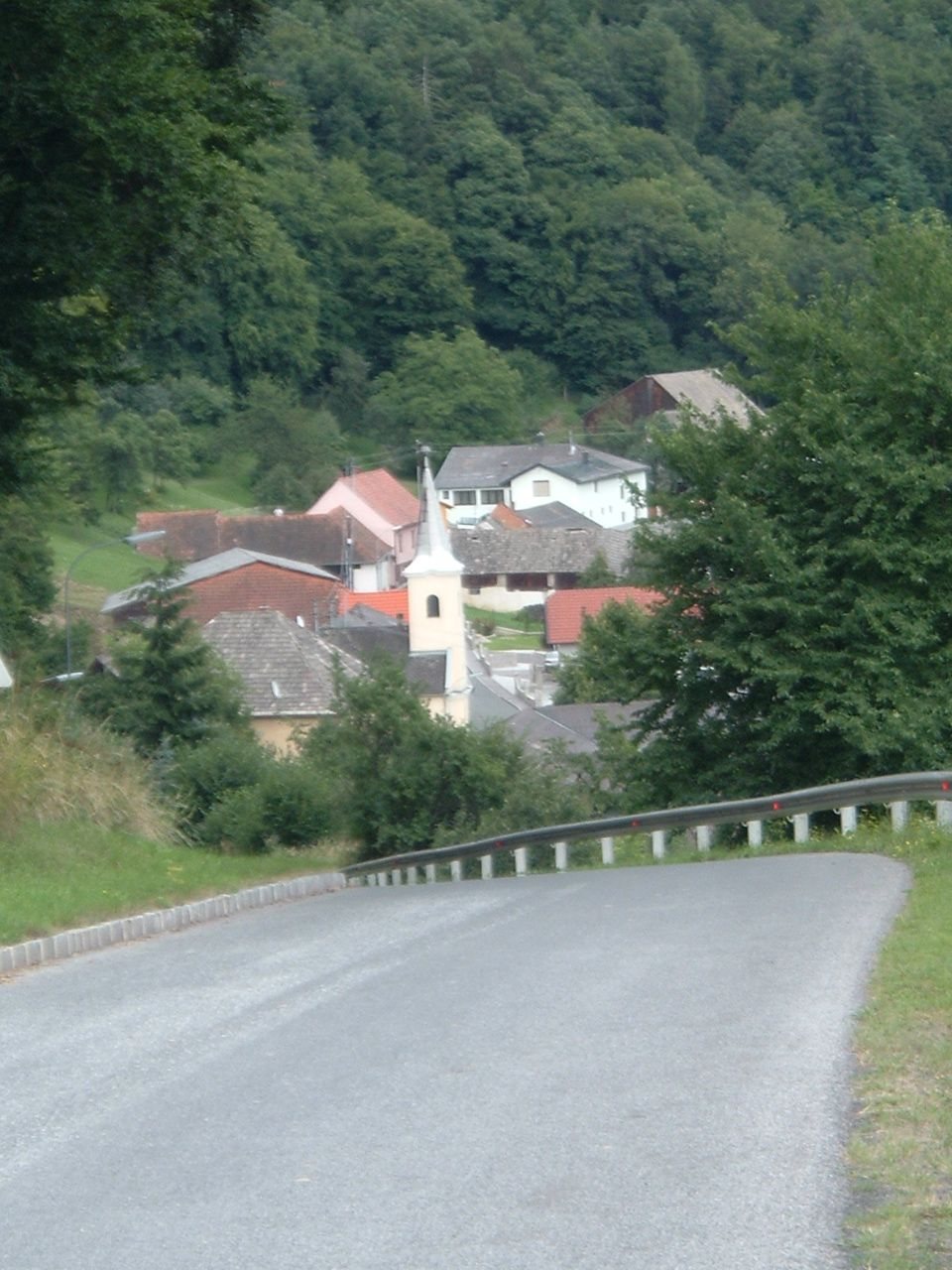
- Panorama of Glashütten bei Schlaining.

- Location within Burgenland Location within Austria
- Coordinates: 47°21′35″N 16°19′58″E
- Country: Austria
- State (Land): Burgenland
- District (Bezirk): Oberwart
- Settled: 1658
- Founder: Ádám Batthyány
- Elevation: 530 m (1,740 ft)

Population (2011)
  - Total: 120 (est.)
- Time zone: UTC+1 (CET)
  - Summer (DST): UTC+2 (CEST)
- Postcode: 7435 Glashütten bei Schlaining
- Area code: +43 (0) 3354

Glashütten bei Schlaining (Hungarian: Szalónakhuta) is an Austrian dependent hamlet in the federal state of Burgenland. Situated in the municipality of Unterkohlstätten within Oberwart district, the official Hungarian placename until 1899 was Szalonok-Üveghuta.

The village is situated on a narrow road in a forested area of the Kőszeg Mountains 12 km from Oberwart (Hungarian: Felsőőr). The road forms a part of the paved 19-km bicycle path (B 58–Kohlstatt) that also takes in Goberling, Unterkohlstätten, Holzschlag (Hung.: Vágod), Günseck (Hung.: Gyöngyösfő) and Weissenbachl.

== Glass works and mining industry ==
In 1658 Count Ádám Batthyány founded a glass factory there; the first official record of the village dates to 1698. The glass works were noted for the manufacture of a beautiful yellow glass resulting from the admixture of sulphur, but the glassmaking enterprise required enormous quantities of firewood, and both Glasshütten bei Schlaining and the nearby village of Günseck were required to supply the factory.

Since the 19th century the inhabitants have been mining metals, particularly antimony but also pyrite, chalcopyrite and serpentinite.

== Modern history ==
An 1857 census records 35 houses in the hamlet and lists the name of the head of each household. In 1910 the population was 216 (mostly German speakers, with a significant minority of Roma). Until the treaties of Trianon and Saint-Germain-en-Laye, Szalónakhuta belonged to the Kőszeg subdivision of Vas district, Hungary. By terms of the Treaty of Trianon, the village was ceded to Austria in 1921, which was itself absorbed between 1938 and 1945 as part of Nazi Germany.

A volunteer fire department was established in 1907 after five houses were consumed by flame on 15 June that year. After World War II the village was electrified in 1951, and in 1958 a water supply system was brought in. The village was administratively attached to the township of Unterkohlstätten in 1971, and on 7 May 1995 a new firehall was opened.

== Church of St. Louis ==
Originally part of the parish of Mariasdorf, then known as Máriafalva, Glashütten became part of the Unterkohlstätten parish when its first Catholic church was built in 1801. The present Romanesque church — dedicated to Saint Louis of Toulouse, whose cult had been much promoted in medieval Europe by King Charles I of Hungary (1307–1342) — was built in 1816; it was sheathed in asbestos in 1906. In 1961 three bells were installed in the belfry.

The church was renovated in 1977 with a contribution of 240,000 schillings (17,500 euros or $23,150 US) from the church authorities in Eisenstadt. In addition, a levy of 1,500 schillings (109 euros or $145 US) was demanded from each of the village's 25 houses, and the local population did 160 days of unpaid labour on the project.
