= Geschriebenstein =

Highest mountain of the Burgenland and western Hungary

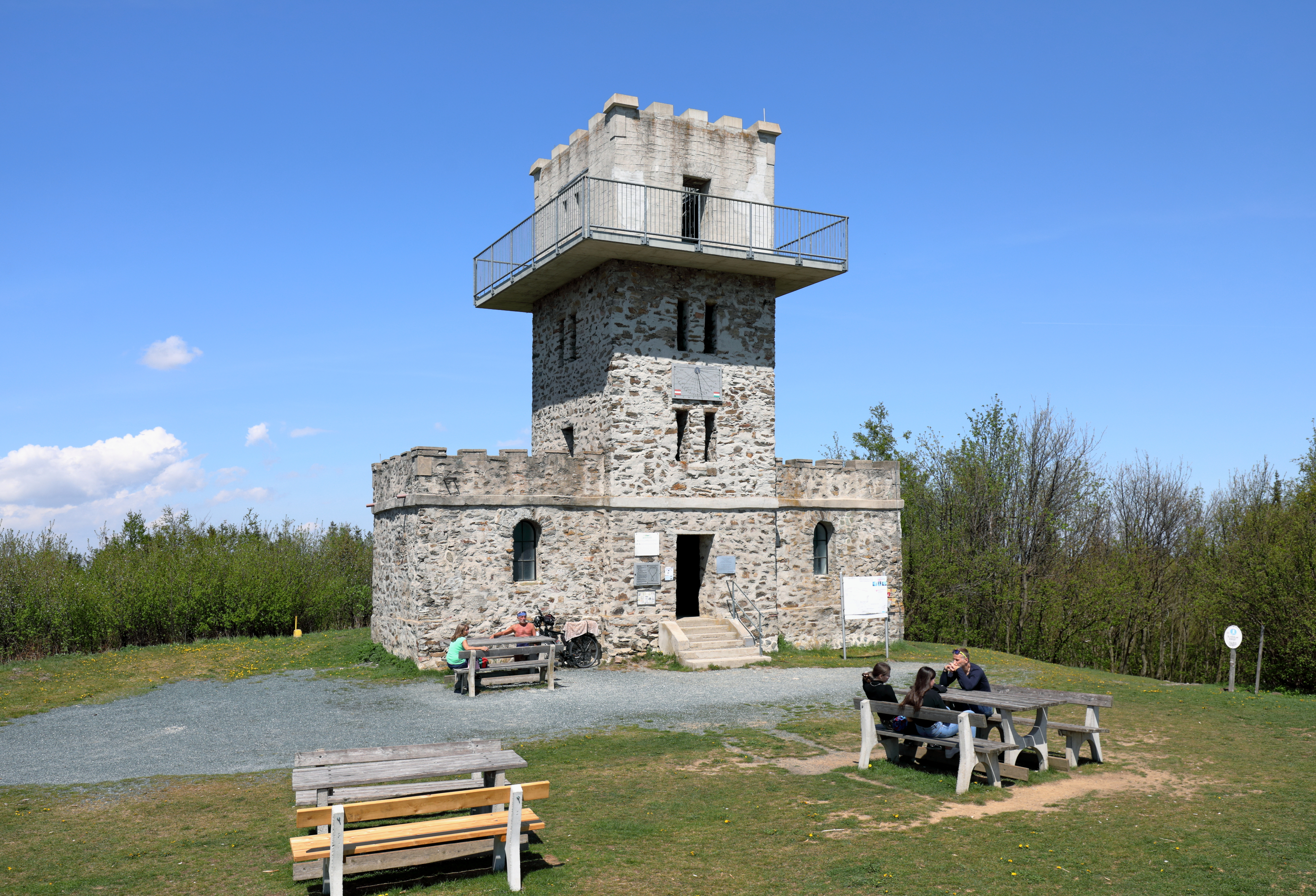
- The viewing tower on the Geschriebenstein located on the border

Highest point
- Elevation: 884 m (AA) (2,900 ft)
- Prominence: 414 metres (1,358 ft) ↓ southeastern Unterkohlstätten
- Isolation: 22.2 kilometres (13.8 mi) → Hutwisch
- Coordinates: 47°21′10″N 16°26′02″E

Geography
- Location within Austria
- Location: Burgenland, Austria and Vas, Hungary
- Parent range: Güns or Kőszegi Mountains, Prealps East of the Mur

Geology
- Rock type: phyllite

The Geschriebenstein (German: [ɡəˈʃʁiːbm̩ˌʃtaɪ̯n]), less commonly called the Írott-kő (Hungarian: [iːrotkøː]) in English sources, is a mountain, 884 metres (2,900 ft) high, located on the border between Austria and Hungary. It is the highest mountain of the Kőszeg Mountains, the highest point in western Hungary (Transdanubia) and highest point in the Burgenland. Its height is 884 metres (2,900 ft) according to Austrian sources, whereas Hungarian references mostly mention 883 metres (2,897 ft). The highest point on the Burgenland side of the border is 879 m (AA) (2,884 ft).

Its former Hungarian names were Fenyőhegy and Szálkő. Its present name (Írottkő in Hungarian, Geschriebenstein in English and German) can be translated as written stone and is assumably derived from border stones with inscriptions between the properties of the Batthyány and Esterházy families. On the summit, there is an observation tower built in 1913. After the Treaty of Saint-Germain of 1919 and the Treaty of Trianon of 1920, the western part of Hungary became part of Austria as the state of Burgenland. Since that, the tower stands exactly on the border between Austria and Hungary.

Since December 2007 the Austrian–Hungarian border can be crossed without formalities, because Hungary has joined the Schengen Agreement.

The closest towns on the Austrian side are Rechnitz and Lockenhaus. On the Hungarian side the closest municipality is Velem and the closest town is Kőszeg.

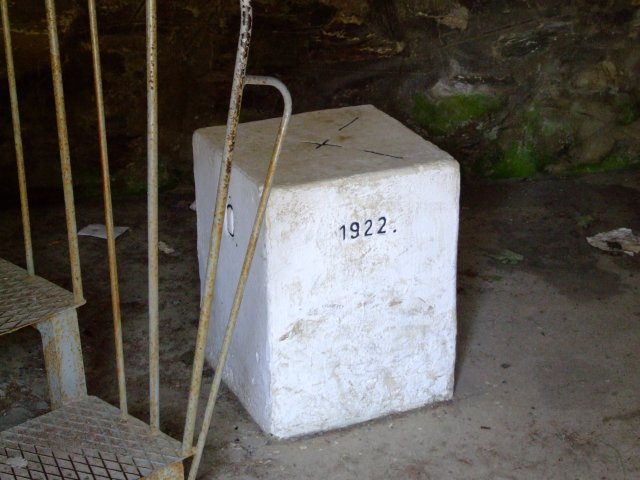
The boundary stone within the lookout tower. Its left side is in Austria (denoted by the Ö for Österreich), its right side is in Hungary (denoted by an M for Magyarország, not visible)
