= Geography of Hungary =

Geography of Hungary
| Continent | Europe |
| Region | East-Central Europe |
| Coordinates | 47°00′N 20°00′E |
| Area | Ranked 108th 93,030 km^{2} (35,920 sq mi) |
| Coastline | 0 km (0 mi); landlocked |
| Borders | 2,009 km (1,248 mi) |
| Highest point | Kékes; 1,014 m |
| Lowest point | Tisza River; 78 m |
| Longest river | Tisza River; 597 km (Hungarian portion) |
| Largest lake | Lake Balaton; 592 km^{2} |

Hungary (Hungarian: Magyarország) is a landlocked country in southeastern Central Europe, on the Eurasian Steppe. Situated in the Carpathian Basin, it has a land area of 93,030 square km, measuring about 250 km from north to south and 524 km from east to west. It has 2,106 km of boundaries, shared with Slovakia to the north, Ukraine to the northeast, Romania to the east and southeast, Serbia to the south, Croatia to the south and southwest, Slovenia to the west and southwest, and Austria to the west.

Hungary's modern borders were first established after World War I when, by the terms of the Treaty of Trianon in 1920, it lost more than 71% of what had formerly been the Kingdom of Hungary, 58.5% of its population, and 32% of the Hungarians. The country secured some boundary revisions from 1938 to 1941: In 1938 the First Vienna Award gave back territory from Czechoslovakia, in 1939 Hungary occupied Carpatho-Ukraine. In 1940 the Second Vienna Award gave back Northern Transylvania and finally Hungary occupied the Bácska and Muraköz regions during the Invasion of Yugoslavia. However, Hungary lost these territories again with its defeat in World War II. After World War II, the Trianon boundaries were restored with a small revision that benefited Czechoslovakia.

Most of the country has an elevation of less than 200 m. Although Hungary has several moderately high ranges of mountains, those reaching heights of 300 m or more cover less than 2% of the country. The highest point in the country is Kékes (1,014 m) in the Mátra Mountains northeast of Budapest. The lowest spot is 77.6 m above sea level, located in the south of Hungary, near Szeged.

The major rivers in the country are the Danube and Tisza. The Danube is navigable within Hungary for 418 kilometers. The Tisza River is navigable for 444 km in the country. Less important rivers include the Drava along the Croatian border, the Rába, the Szamos, the Sió, and the Ipoly along the Slovak border. Hungary has three major lakes. Lake Balaton, the largest, is 78 km long and from 3 to 14 km wide, with an area of 600 square km. Hungarians often refer to it as the Hungarian Sea. It is Central Europe's largest freshwater lake and an important recreation area. Its shallow waters offer good summer swimming, and in winter its frozen surface provides excellent opportunities for winter sports. Smaller bodies of water are Lake Velence (26 square km) in Fejér County and Lake Fertő (Neusiedler See—about 82 square km within Hungary), and the artificial Lake Tisza.

Hungary has three major geographic regions (which are subdivided to seven smaller ones): the Great Alföld, lying east of the Danube River; the Transdanubia, a hilly region lying west of the Danube and extending to the Austrian foothills of the Alps; and the North Hungarian Mountains, which is a mountainous and hilly country beyond the northern boundary of the Great Hungarian Plain.

The country's best natural resource is fertile land, although soil quality varies greatly. About 70% of the country's total territory is suitable for agriculture; of this portion, 72% is arable land. Hungary lacks extensive domestic sources of energy and raw materials needed for industrial development.

== Plains and hills ==
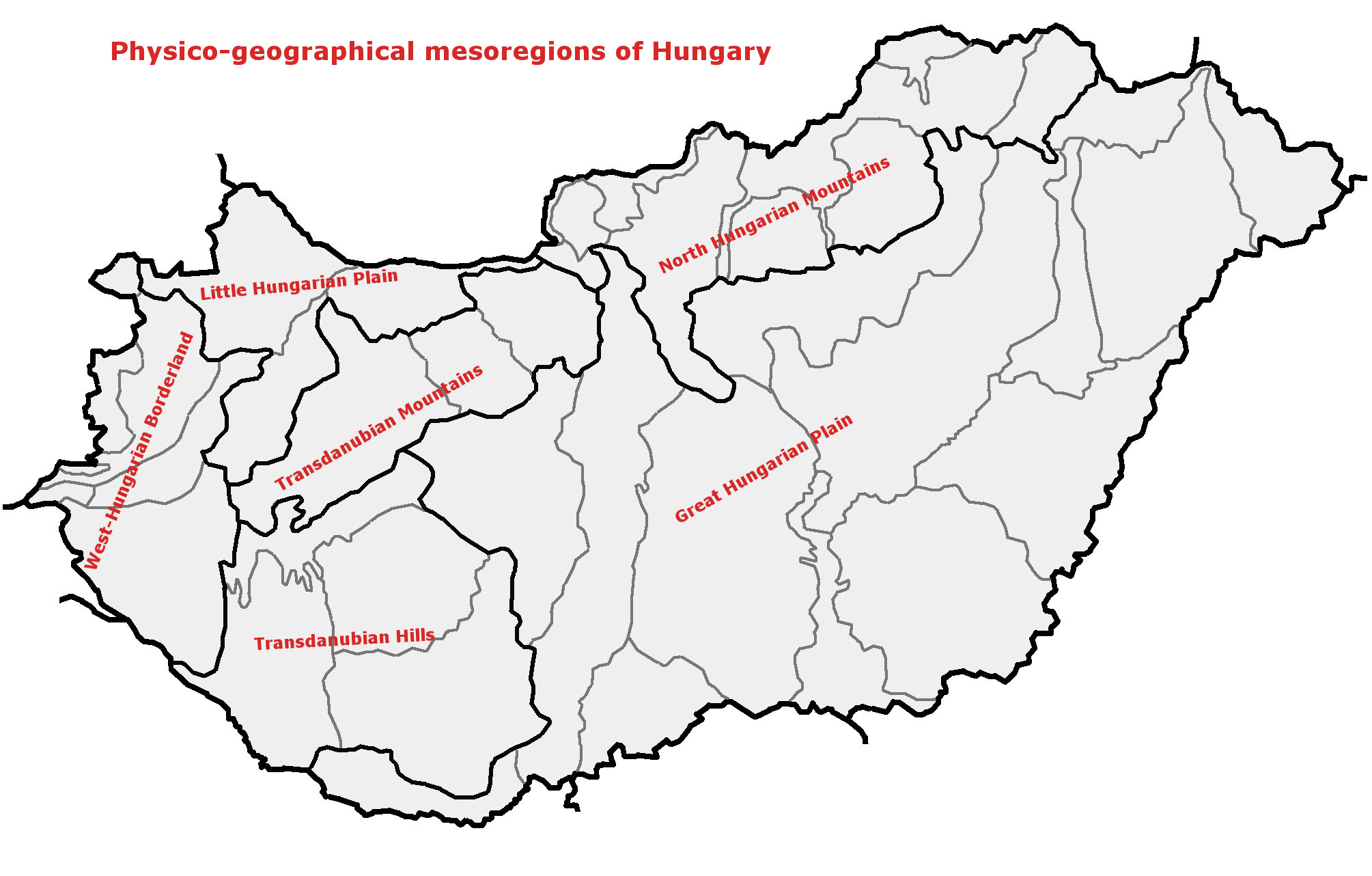
Physico-geographical mesoregions of Hungary: 1. Great Hungarian Plain; 2. North Hungarian Mountains; 3. Transdanubian Mountains; 4. Transdanubian Hills; 5. Little Hungarian Plain; 6. West-Hungarian Borderland

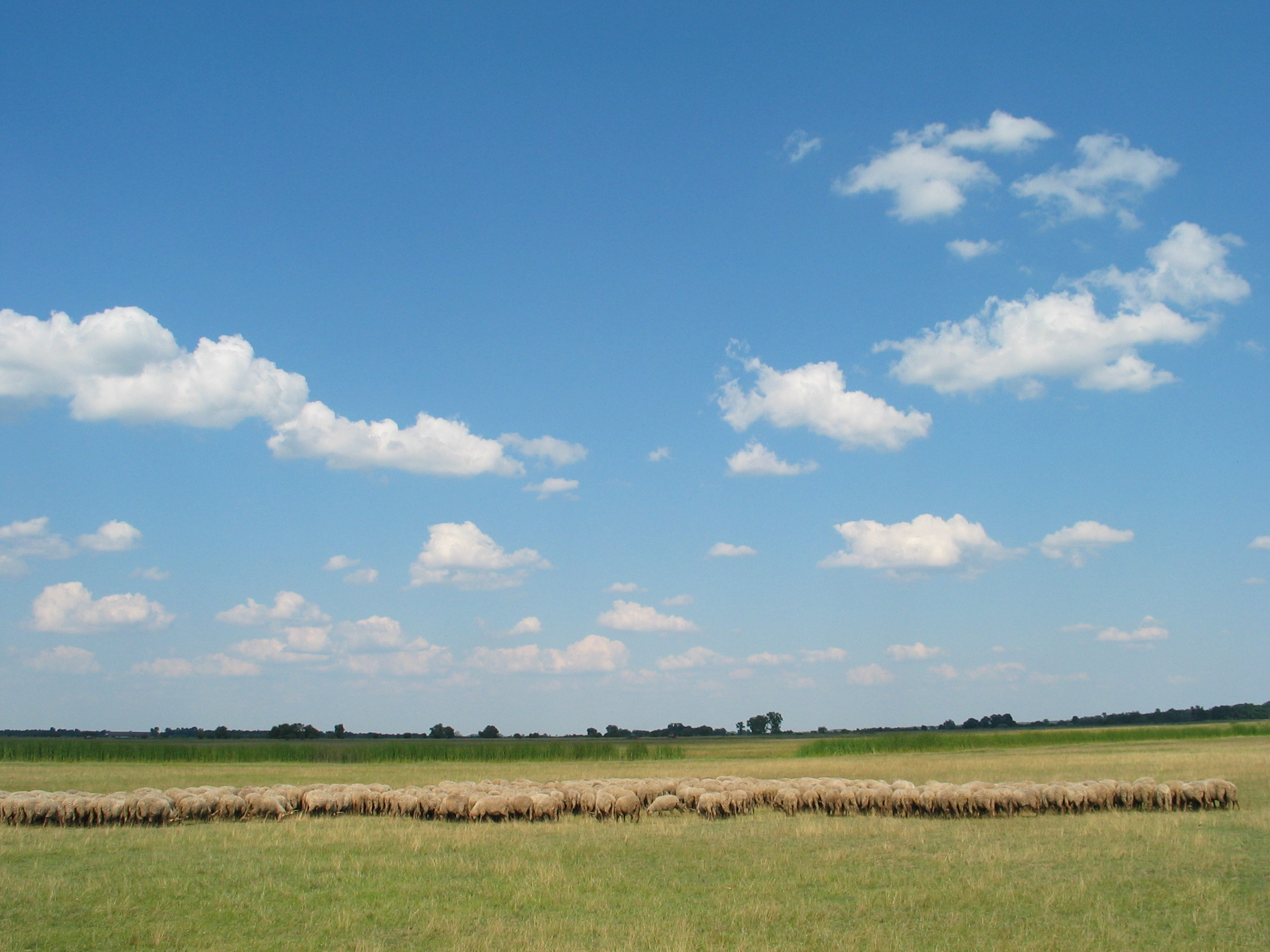
Hortobágy National Park on the Great Hungarian Plain with Racka sheep

The Little Alföld or Little Hungarian Plain is a plain (tectonic basin) of approximately 8,000 km^{2} in northwestern Hungary, southwestern Slovakia and eastern Austria, along the lower course of the Rába River, with high quality fertile soils.

The Transdanubia region lies in the western part of the country, bounded by the Danube River, the Drava River, and the remainder of the country's border with Slovenia and Croatia. It lies south and west of the course of the Danube. It contains Lake Fertő and Lake Balaton. The region consists mostly of rolling hills. Transdanubia is primarily an agricultural area, with flourishing crops, livestock, and viticulture. Mineral deposits and oil are found in Zala county close to the border of Croatia.

The Great Alföld contains the basin of the Tisza River and its branches. It encompasses more than half of the country's territory. Bordered by mountains on all sides, it has a variety of terrains, including regions of fertile soil, sandy areas, wastelands, and swampy areas. Hungarians have inhabited the Great Plain for at least a millennium. Here is found the puszta, a long, and uncultivated expanse (the most famous such area still in existence is the Hortobágy National Park), with which much Hungarian folklore is associated. In earlier centuries, the Great Plain was unsuitable for farming because of frequent flooding. Instead, it was the home of massive herds of cattle and horses. In the last half of the 19th century, the government sponsored programs to control the riverways and expedite inland drainage in the Great Plain. With the danger of recurrent flooding largely eliminated, much of the land was placed under cultivation, and herding ceased to be a major contributor to the area's economy.

== Mountains ==
Although the majority of the country has an elevation lesser than 300 m, Hungary has several moderately high ranges of mountains. They can be classified to four geographic regions, from west to east: Alpokalja, Transdanubian Mountains, Mecsek and North Hungarian Mountains. Alpokalja (literally the foothills of the Alps) is located along the Austrian border; its highest point is Írott-kő with an elevation of 882 metres. The Transdanubian Mountains stretch from the west part of Lake Balaton to the Danube Bend near Budapest, where it meets the North Hungarian Mountains. Its tallest peak is the 757 m high Pilis. Mecsek is the southernmost Hungarian mountain range, located north from Pécs - Its highest point is the Zengő with 682 metres.

The North Hungarian Mountains lie north of Budapest and run in a northeasterly direction south of the border with Slovakia. The higher ridges, which are mostly forested, have rich coal and iron deposits. Minerals are a major resource of the area and have long been the basis of the industrial economies of cities in the region. Viticulture is also important, producing the famous Tokaji wine. The highest peak of it is the Kékes, located in the Mátra mountain range.

=== Highest independent peaks ===
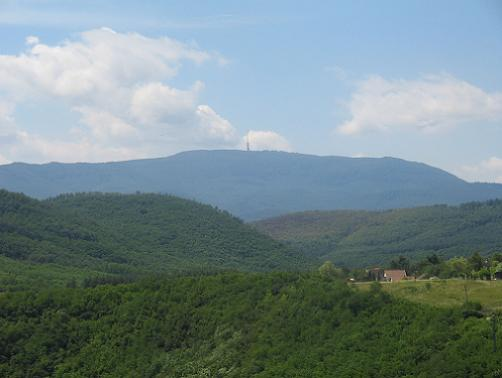
1. Kékes

| | Name | Height | Range | Geographic region |
|---|---|---|---|---|
| 1 | Kékestető | 1,014 m | Mátra | North Hungarian Mountains |
| 2 | Galya-tető | 964 m | Mátra | North Hungarian Mountains |
| 3 | Szilvási-kő | 961 m | Bükk | North Hungarian Mountains |
| 4 | Istállós-kő | 959 m | Bükk | North Hungarian Mountains |
| 5 | Bálvány | 956 m | Bükk | North Hungarian Mountains |
| 6 | Tar-kő | 950 m | Bükk | North Hungarian Mountains |
| 7 | Csóványos | 938 m | Börzsöny | North Hungarian Mountains |
| 8 | Magos-fa | 916 m | Börzsöny | North Hungarian Mountains |
| 9 | Nagy-Milic | 895 m | Zemplén Mountains | North Hungarian Mountains |
| 10 | Írott-kő | 882 m | Kőszeg Mountains | Alpokalja |

== Climate ==
Hungary map of Köppen climate classification.

Hungary has a mainly continental climate with the rest of the Pannonian Plain, with cold winters and warm to hot summers. The average annual temperature is about 10 °C (50 °F), in summer 27 to 35 °C (81 to 95 °F), and in winter 0 to −15 °C (32 to 5 °F), with extremes ranging from about 42 °C (108 °F) in summer to −35 °C (−31 °F) in winter. Average yearly rainfall is about 600 mm (23.6 in). Distribution and frequency of rainfall are unpredictable. The western part of the country usually receives more rain than the eastern part, where severe droughts may occur in summertime. Weather conditions in the Great Plain can be especially harsh, with hot summers, cold winters, and scant rainfall.

By the 1980s, the countryside was beginning to show the effects of pollution, both from herbicides used in agriculture and from industrial pollutants. Most noticeable was the gradual contamination of the country's bodies of water, endangering fish and wildlife. Although concern was mounting over these disturbing threats to the environment, no major steps had yet been taken to arrest them.

== Rivers and lakes ==
Rivers

The springs of the major Hungarian rivers are outside the country. The two most important rivers, the Danube and the Tisza are navigable on their whole Hungarian length. They have several tributaries.

Name
Length in Hungary
Danube
417 km
Tisza
596 km
Leitha
180 km
Rábca

Rába
211 km
Zala
139 km
Dráva
125 km
Ipoly
143 km
Zagyva
160 km
Sajó
125 km
Hernád
118 km
Bodrog
52 km
Szamos

Körös

Maros
48 km

Lakes

Hungary has several bodies of water, including the greatest lake of Central Europe, Lake Balaton, which is a famous tourist destination. Lake Hévíz, the largest thermal lake in the world (47,500 square metres in area) is located in Hungary as well. The Lake Cave (Hungarian: Barlangtó) of Tapolca is also notable as being a sub-surface lake. Major lakes include:

Name
Surface in Hungary
Balaton
596 km^{2}
Tisza (artificial)
127 km^{2}
Fertő
75 km^{2}
Velence
26 km^{2}

== Agriculture ==
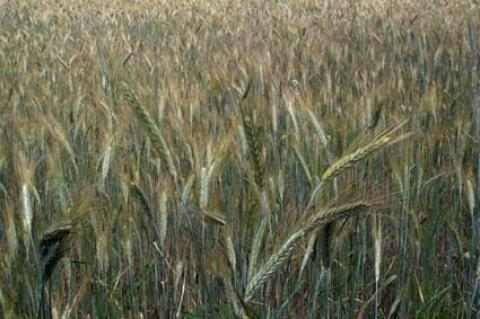
Wheat field, Hungary

Hungary, with its plains and hilly regions, is highly suitable for agriculture.

=== Arable land ===
Doubtless, one of Hungary's most important natural resources is arable land. It covers about 48.57% of the country, which is outstanding in the world (see the related map). The mass majority of the fertile soil has a good quality.

The most important agricultural zones are the Little Hungarian Plain (it has the highest quality fertile soil in average), Transdanubia, and the Great Hungarian Plain. The last covers more than half of the country (52,000 km^{2} in number), whereas soil quality varies extremely; the territory even contains a small, grassy semi-desert, the so-called puszta (steppe in English). Puszta is exploited by sheep and cattle raising.

The most important Hungarian agricultural products include corn, wheat, barley, oat, sunflower, poppy, potato, millet, sugar-beet, flax, and many other plants. There are also some newly naturalized plants too, for example amaranth. Poppy seed is part of the traditional Hungarian cuisine.

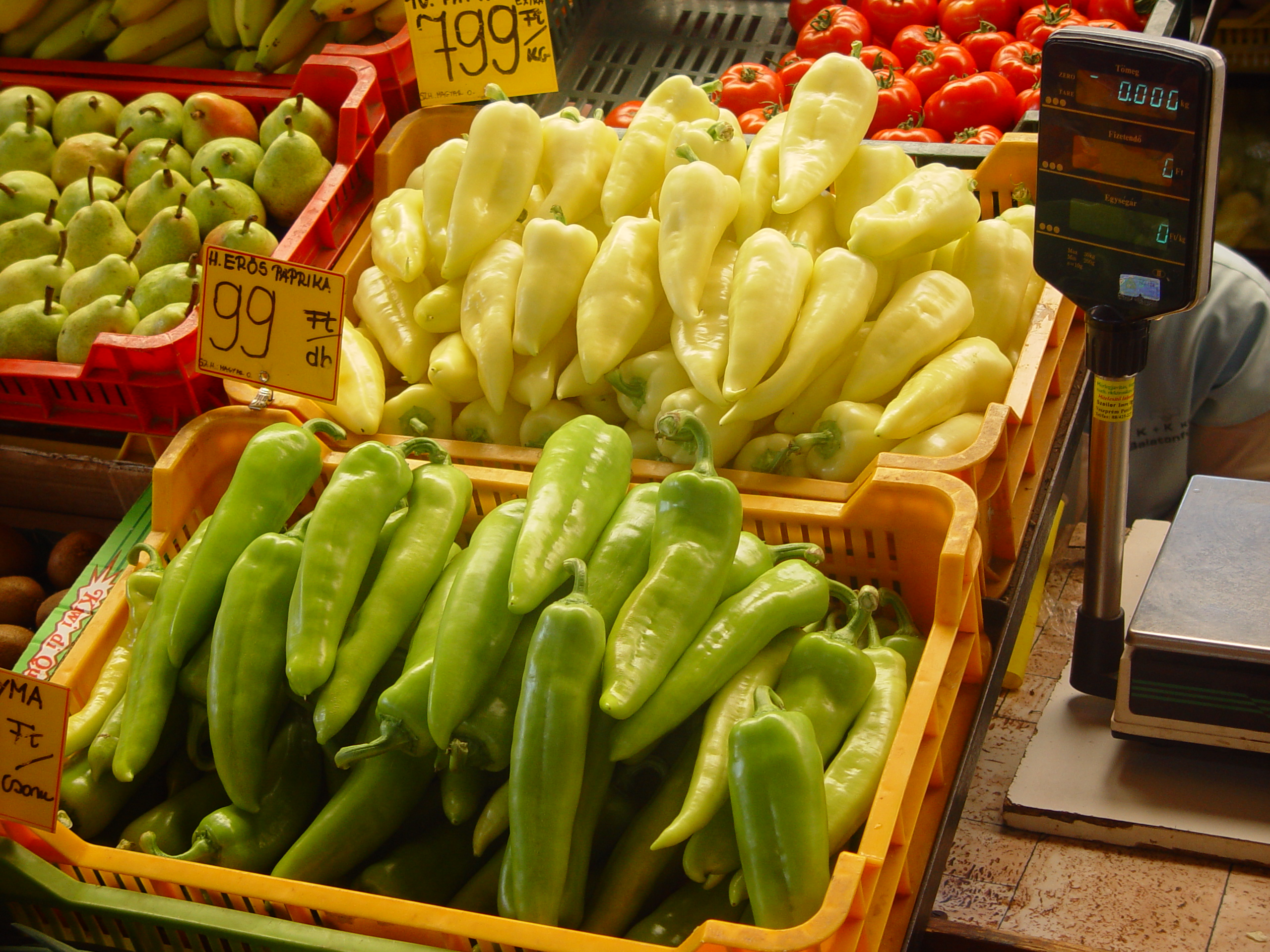
A greengrocer's in Hungary

The country is well known for producing high quality peppers, which are often made into paprika. There are numerous fruits reared, including many subspecies of apple, pear, peach, grape, apricot, watermelon, cantaloupe, etc.

Hungary does not grow any GMO products, thus these products are mainly imported from the United States. They cannot, however, be distributed without a mark on the wrapping.

=== Viticulture ===
Wine production has a long history in Hungary. There are two languages in Europe in which the word for "wine" does not derive from the Latin, being Greek – and Hungarian. The Hungarian word is bor.

Viticulture has been recorded in the territory of today's Hungary since the Roman times, who were responsible for the introduction of the cultivation of wines. The arriving Hungarians took over the practice and have maintained it ever since.

Today, there are numerous wine regions in Hungary, producing quality and inexpensive wines as well, comparable to Western European ones. The majority of the country's wine regions are located in the mountains or in the hills, such as Transdanubian Mountains, North Hungarian Mountains, Villány Mountains, and so on. Important ones include the regions of Eger, Hajós, Somló, Sopron, Villány, Szekszárd, and Tokaj-Hegyalja.

=== Forestry ===
19% of the country is covered by forests. These are mainly mountainous areas, such as the North Hungarian and the Transdanubian Mountains, and the Alpokalja. The composition of forests is various, with trees like fir, beech, oak, willow, acacia, plane, etc.

== Political geography ==
Hungary's current counties are largely based on the country's historic regions. The counties are subdivided into districts (járás), and these are further divided into municipalities (település). Hungary has 19 counties, 174 districts + 23 districts in Budapest and 2,722 municipality.

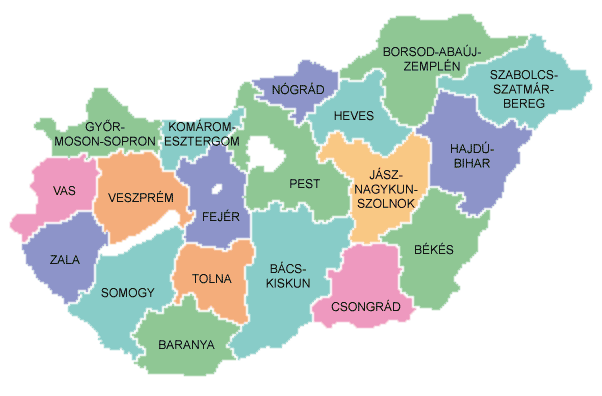

| County | Seat | Area (km^{2}) | Population |
|---|---|---|---|
| Baranya | Pécs | 4,430 | 386,441 |
| Bács-Kiskun | Kecskemét | 8,445 | 520,331 |
| Békés | Békéscsaba | 5,630 | 359,948 |
| Borsod-Abaúj-Zemplén | Miskolc | 7,250 | 686,266 |
| Csongrád-Csanád | Szeged | 4,263 | 417,456 |
| Fejér | Székesfehérvár | 4,358 | 425,847 |
| Győr-Moson-Sopron | Győr | 4,208 | 447,985 |
| Hajdú-Bihar | Debrecen | 6,211 | 546,721 |
| Heves | Eger | 3,637 | 308,882 |
| Jász-Nagykun-Szolnok | Szolnok | 5,582 | 386,594 |
| Komárom-Esztergom | Tatabánya | 2,265 | 304,568 |
| Nógrád | Salgótarján | 2,545 | 202,427 |
| Pest | Budapest | 6,393 | 1,217,476 |
| Somogy | Kaposvár | 6,065 | 317,307 |
| Szabolcs-Szatmár-Bereg | Nyíregyháza | 5,936 | 559,272 |
| Tolna | Szekszárd | 3,703 | 230,361 |
| Vas | Szombathely | 3,336 | 256,629 |
| Veszprém | Veszprém | 4,464 | 351,898 |
| Zala | Zalaegerszeg | 3,784 | 282,179 |

== Area and boundaries ==
=== Area ===
- Total: 93,030 km^{2}

country comparison to the world: 108th

- Land: 92,340 km^{2}
- Water: 690 km^{2} (0.74% of total land area)

=== Boundaries ===
- Land boundaries: total: 2,009 km (1,248 mi).
- Border countries and length: Austria: 366 km (227 mi), Slovakia: 679 km (422 mi), Ukraine: 103 km (64 mi), Romania: 443 km (275 mi), Serbia: 151 km (94 mi), Croatia: 329 km (204 mi) and Slovenia: 102 km (63 mi)

=== Area comparison ===
- Brazil comparative: slightly smaller than Santa Catarina
- China comparative: about half of Hubei
- India comparative: slightly larger than West Bengal
- Russia comparative: slightly smaller than Altai Republic
- South Africa comparative: slightly smaller than KwaZulu-Natal
- United Kingdom comparative: larger than Scotland
- United States comparative: slightly smaller than Indiana
- Sweden comparative slightly smaller than Norrbotten

== Resources and land use ==
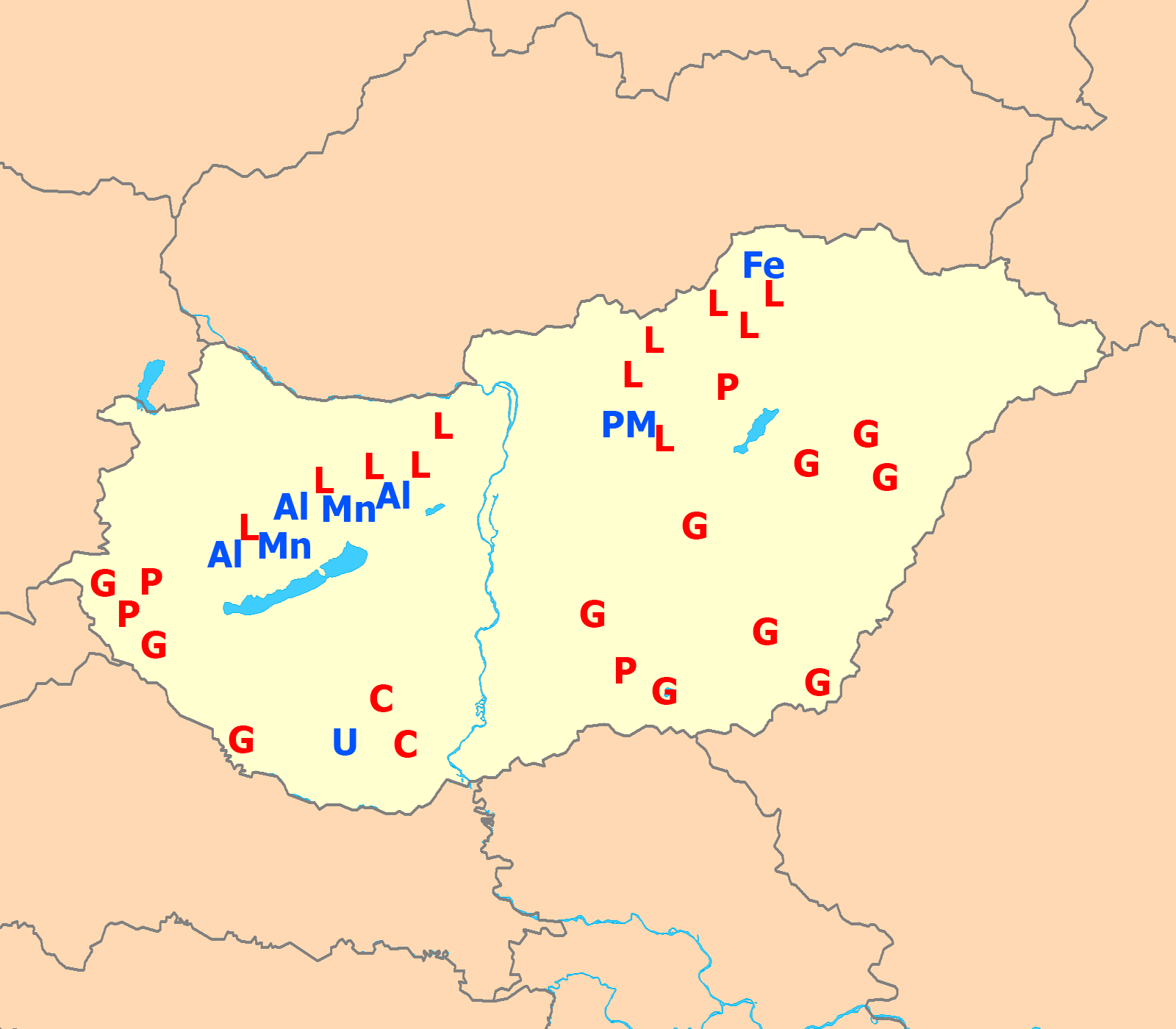
Natural resources of Hungary. Metals are in blue (Al — aluminium ore, Mn — manganese, Fe — iron ore, U — uranium, PM — polymetallic ores (Cu, Zn, Pb)). Fossil fuels are in red (C — coal, L — lignite, P — petroleum, G — natural gas).

- Natural resources: bauxite, coal, natural gas, fertile soils, arable land
- Land use: arable land: 51%; permanent crops: 3.6%; permanent pastures 12.4%
- Forests of Hungary and woodlands: 19%; other: 14% (1999 est.)
- Irrigated land: 2,060 km.^{2} (1993 est.)
- Important rivers: Danube (Duna), Tisza, Drava (Dráva), Körös, Mur (Mura)

== Environmental concerns ==
Natural hazards: occasional flooding

National parks

Environment - current issues: The approximation of Hungary's standards in waste management, energy efficiency, and air, soil, and water pollution with environmental requirements for EU accession will require large investments.

Environment - international agreements:

party to: Air Pollution, Air Pollution-Nitrogen Oxides, Air Pollution-Sulphur 85, Air Pollution-Volatile Organic Compounds, Antarctic Treaty, Biodiversity, Climate Change, Desertification, Endangered Species, Environmental Modification, Hazardous Wastes, Law of the Sea, Marine Dumping, Nuclear Test Ban, Ozone Layer Protection, Ship Pollution, Wetlands

signed, but not ratified: Air Pollution-Persistent Organic Pollutants, Air Pollution-Sulphur 94, Antarctic-Environmental Protocol

Geography - note: landlocked; strategic location astride main land routes between Western Europe and Balkan Peninsula as well as between Ukraine and Mediterranean basin

== Extreme points ==
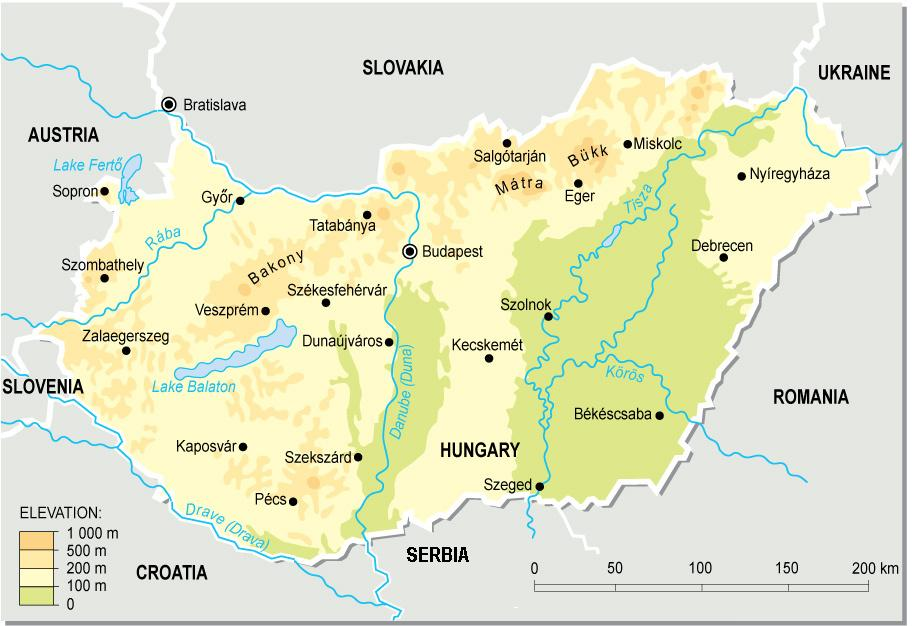
Map of the extreme points of Hungary

=== Elevation ===
- Highest point: Kékes, at 1,014 m, 47°52′20.86″N 20°0′34.18″E, Gyöngyös (Heves County)
- Lowest point: Gyálarét (Municipality of Szeged), at 78 m, 46°12′19.3″N 20°6′33.1″E, Szeged (Csongrád-Csanád County)

=== Latitude and longitude ===
- Westernmost settlement: Felsőszölnök (Vas County), 46°52′14.12″N 16°9′35.03″E
- Easternmost settlement: Garbolc (Szabolcs-Szatmár-Bereg County), 47°56′42.61″N 22°51′35.75″E
- Northernmost settlement: Hidvégardó (Borsod-Abaúj-Zemplén County), 48°33′38.3″N 20°50′17.7″E
- Southernmost settlement: Kásád (Baranya County), 45°46′41″N 18°24′3″E

=== Centre ===
- Geographical centre: 47°10′48.31″N 19°30′13.45″E, Pusztavacs (Pest County)

== Pictures ==
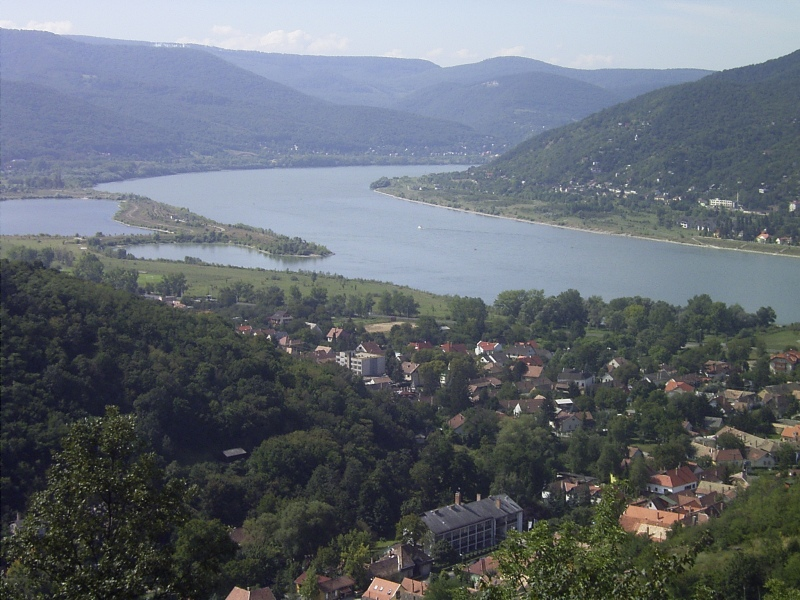
A famous tourist destination: the Danube Bend

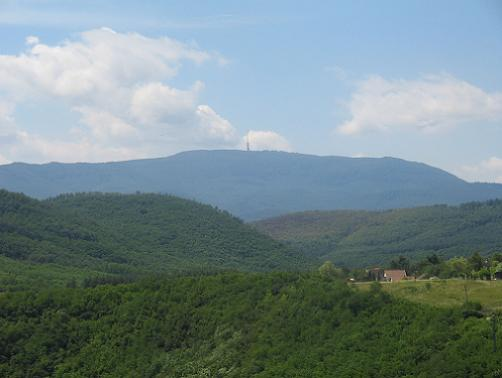
The mountainous part of the county: in the North Hungarian Mountains, more precisely in Mátra

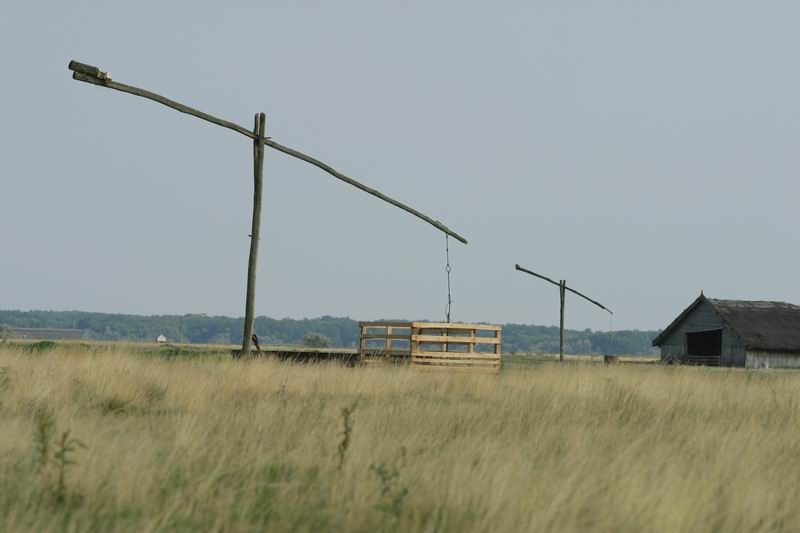
Old wells in the Great Alföld

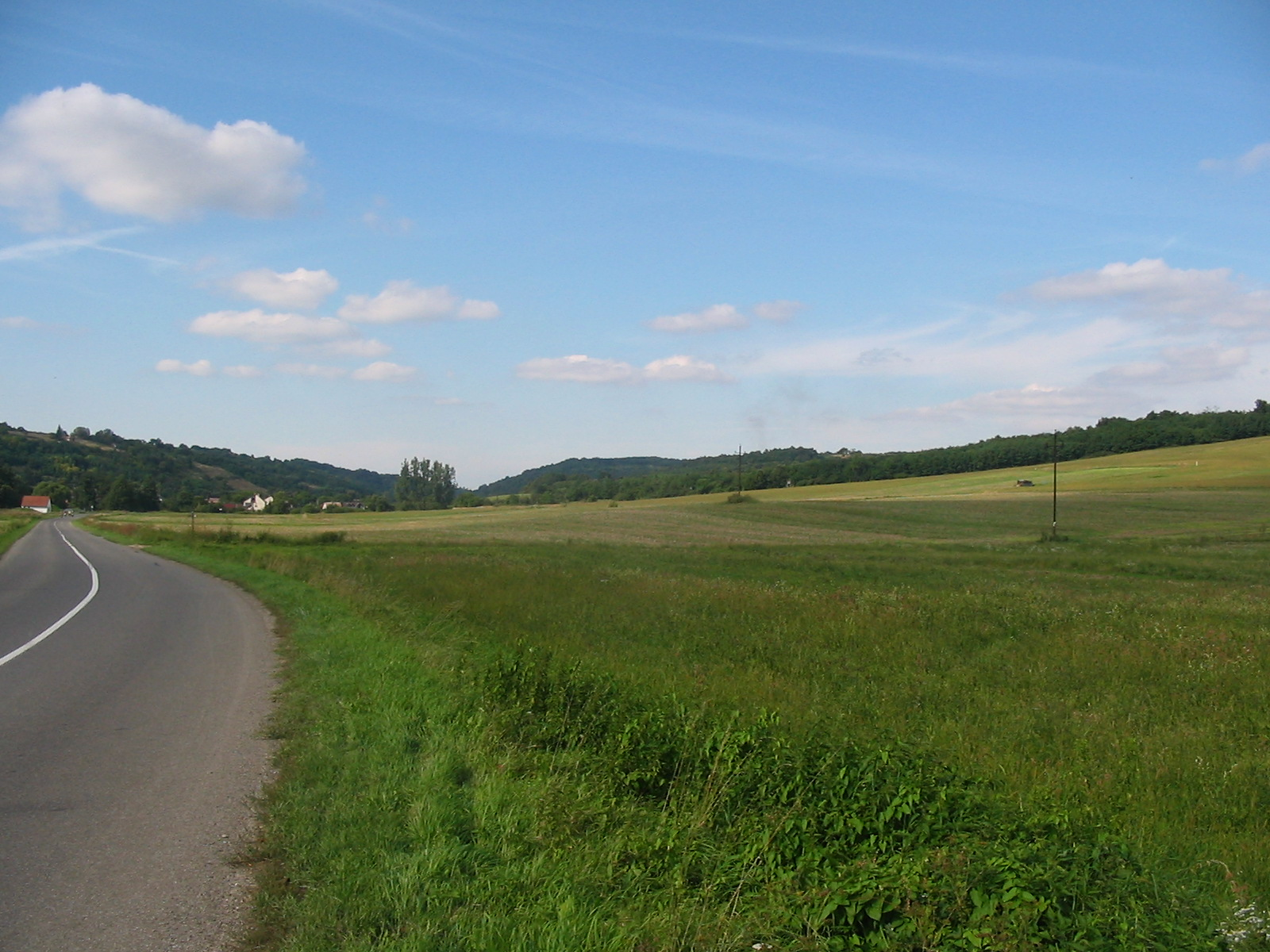
Typical countryside in Transdanubia

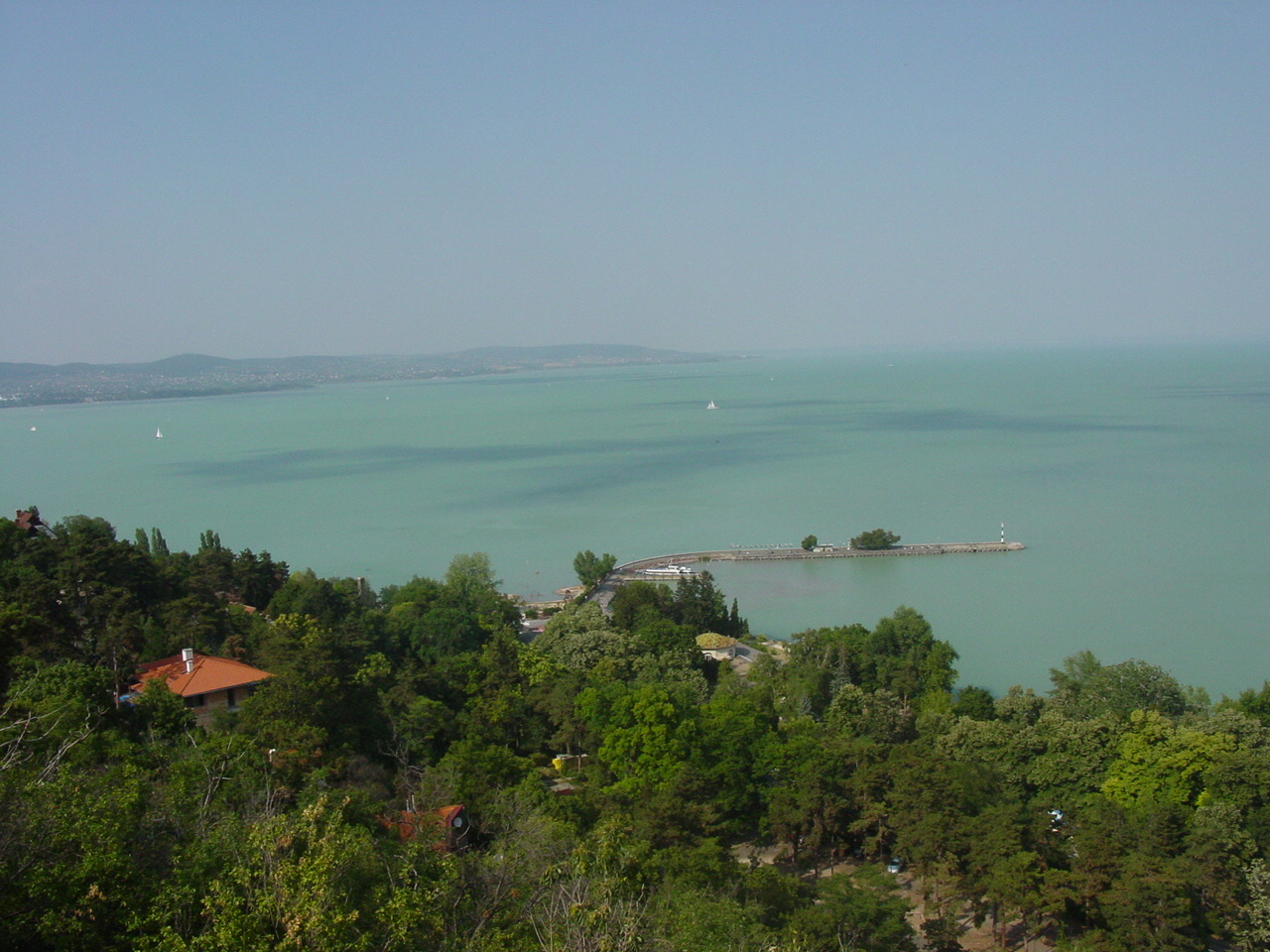
Balaton, the greatest lake of Hungary is sometimes referred as the "Hungarian sea".

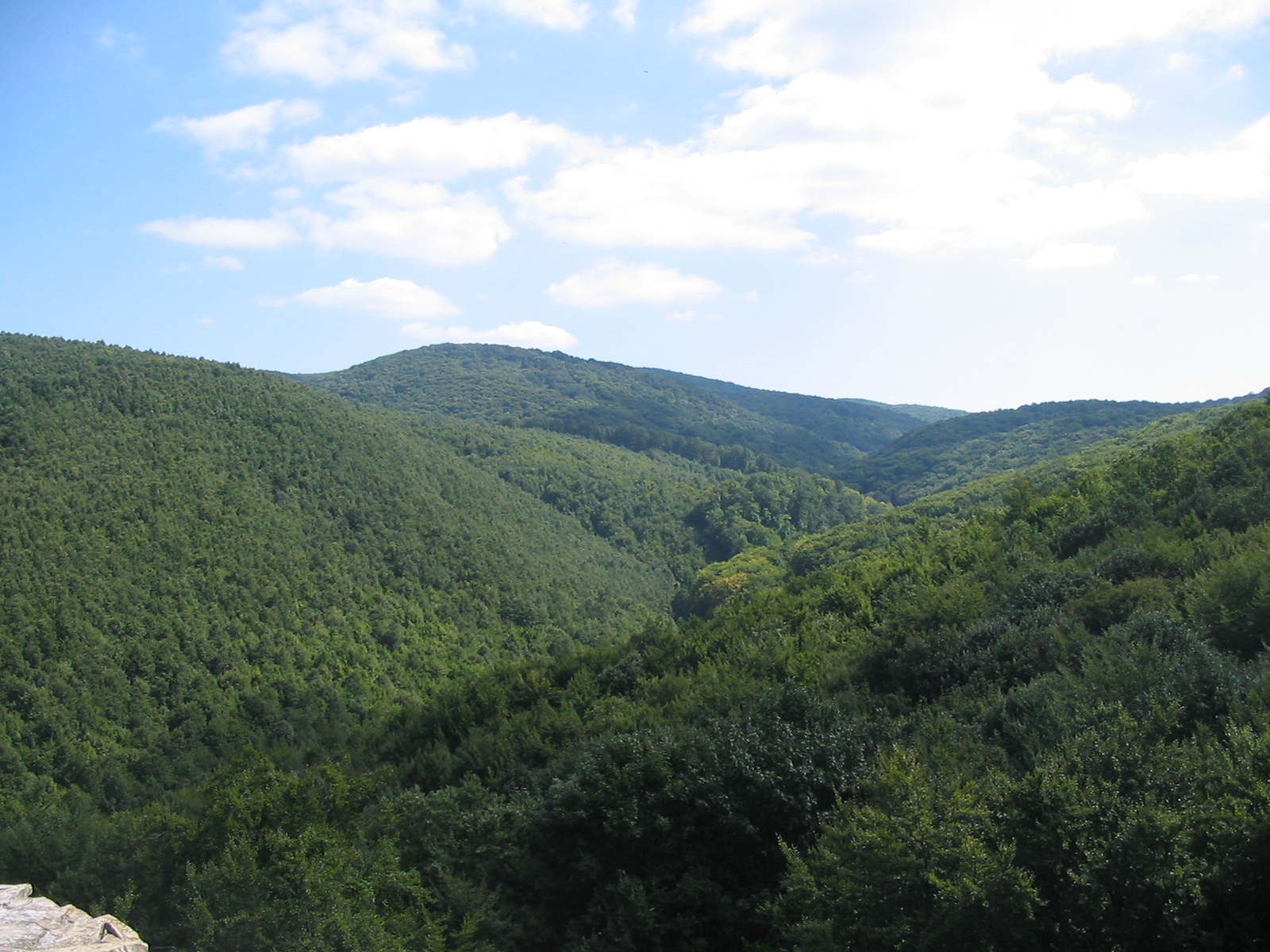
Mecsek, Southern Hungary

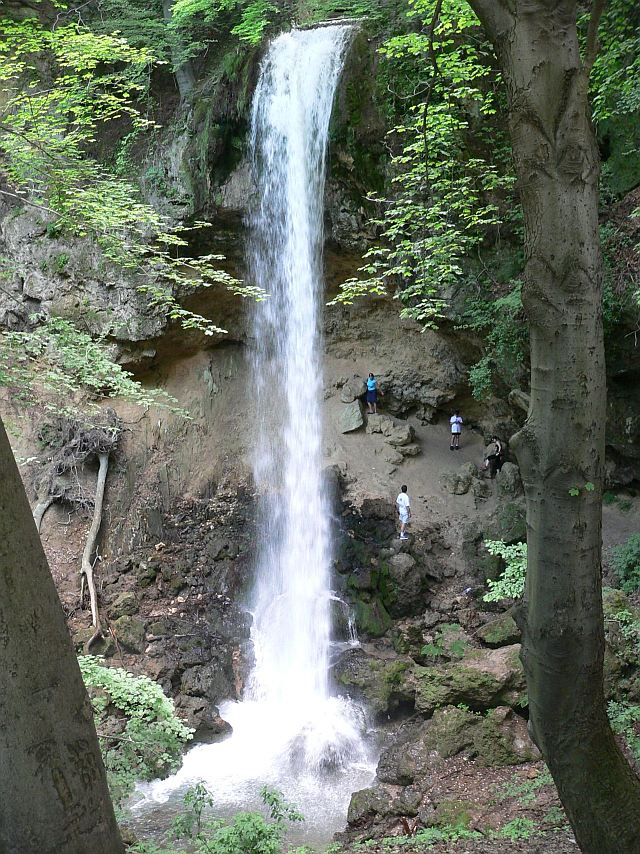
The waterfall of Lillafüred

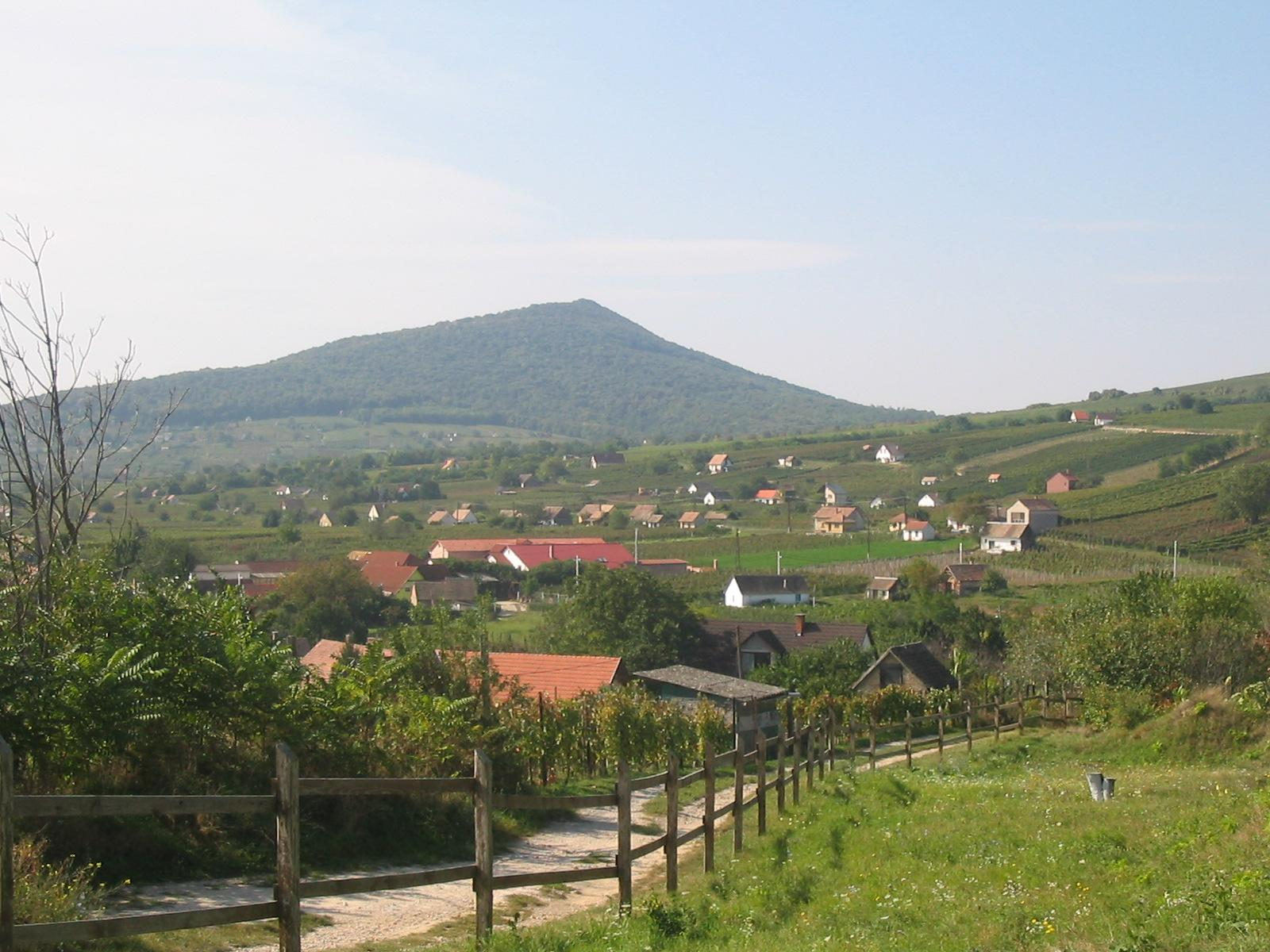
Viticulture near Villány

== See also ==
- Administrative divisions of Hungary
- Extreme points of Hungary
- Tourism in Hungary
- List of cities and towns in Hungary
- List of rivers of Hungary
- List of mountains in Hungary
- Pannonian Plain
- Eurasian Steppe
- Geography of Europe
