= Alpokalja =

Geographic region in western Hungary

Coordinates: 47°22′N 16°32′E

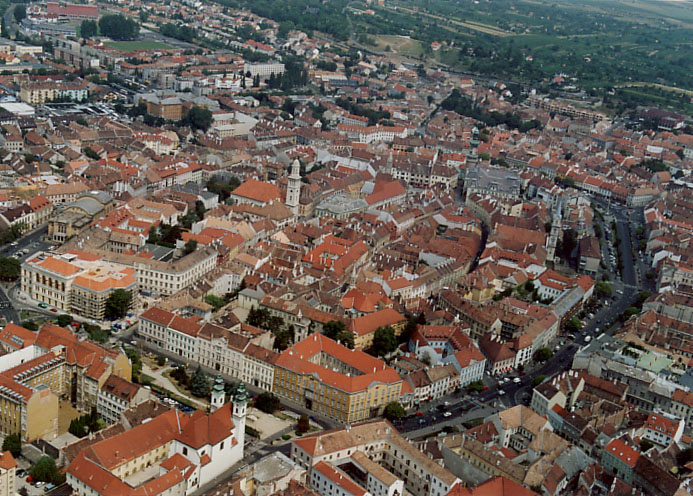
- The city of Sopron is located in the range
- Location: Western Hungary
- Highest elevation: 882 m (2,894 ft) (Írott-kő)

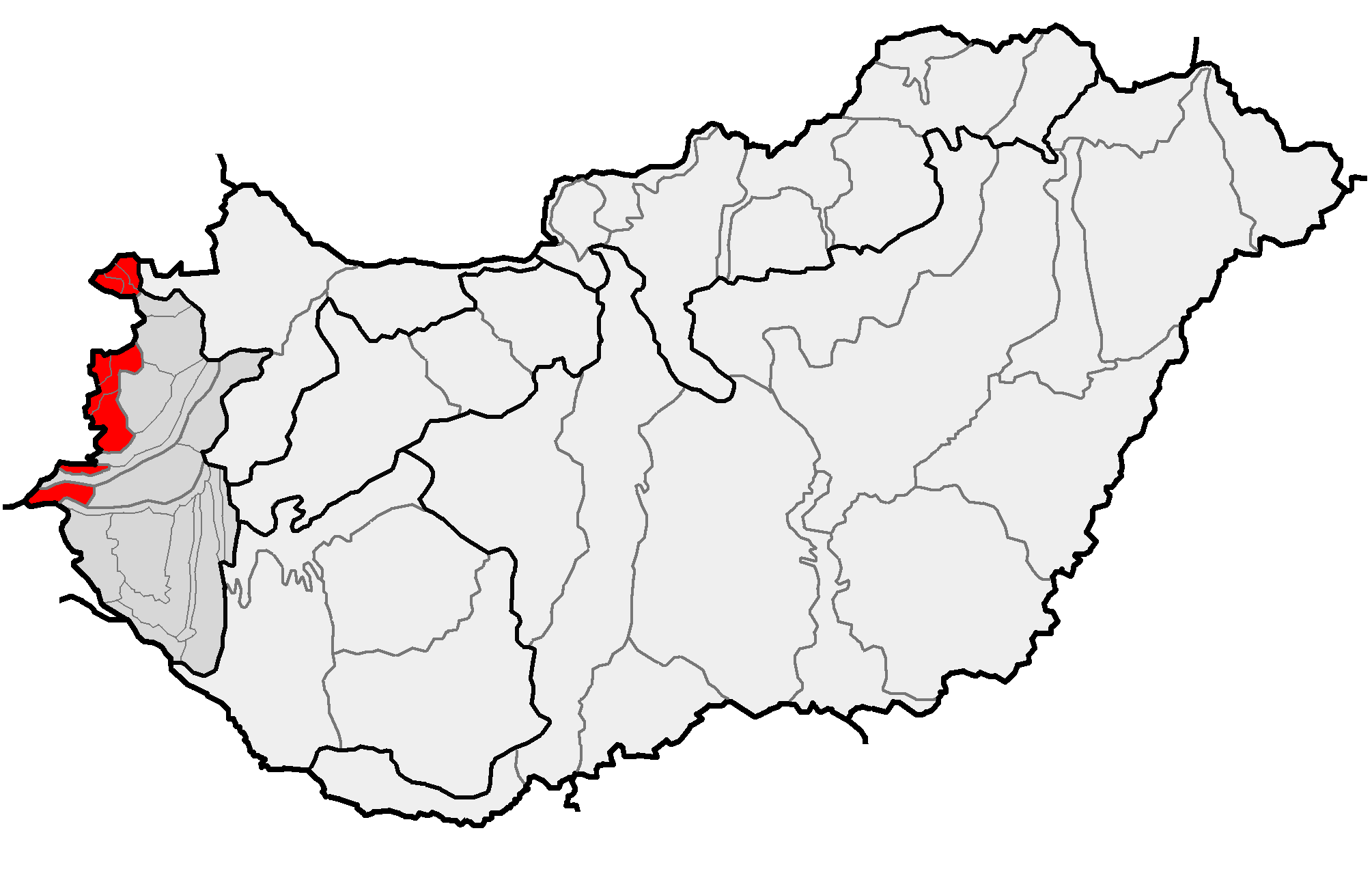
Location of Alpokalja (in red) within physical subdivisions of Hungary.

Alpokalja (English "feet of the Alps") is a mountainous region in western Hungary. Its highest point is Írott-kő at 882 metres above sea level. Although there are several lower mountains, the majority of the territory is hilly. Fir forests are characteristic to the region. Alpokalja contains two major but not very extensive mountain ranges: the Kőszeg Mountains and the Sopron Mountains. The Vas Hills and Balfi Hills are also considered part of the territory.

== See also ==
- Geography of Hungary
- Little Alföld
