= Danube Bend =

Curve in the Danube River near the town of Visegrád, Hungary

Coordinates: 47°45′51″N 18°55′54″E

The Danube Bend (Hungarian: Dunakanyar) is a curve of the Danube in Hungary, close to the town of Visegrád.

The Transdanubian Mountains lie on the right bank (left side of the picture), while the North Hungarian Mountains on the left bank (right side of the picture).

== Geology ==
The present-day U-shaped loop is probably the result of an eruption of the volcano stretching over the whole area some 15 million years ago. The caldera of Keserűs Hill-volcano, with the associated lava dome formed a later eroded central caldera in the north. The river follows the southern edge of this caldera.

== Region ==
This region is touristically very significant. The landscape and the river attracts a lot of visitors both from the homeland and abroad. The most important towns are Visegrád, Szentendre and Budapest, while on the other (left) bank of the river can be found Dunakeszi, Göd, Sződliget, Vác, Nagymaros, Kismaros, Verőce and Szob. The islands of the region are also interesting, mainly the large Szentendrei-sziget and Margaret Island (Margitsziget) within the capital city.

== Gallery ==
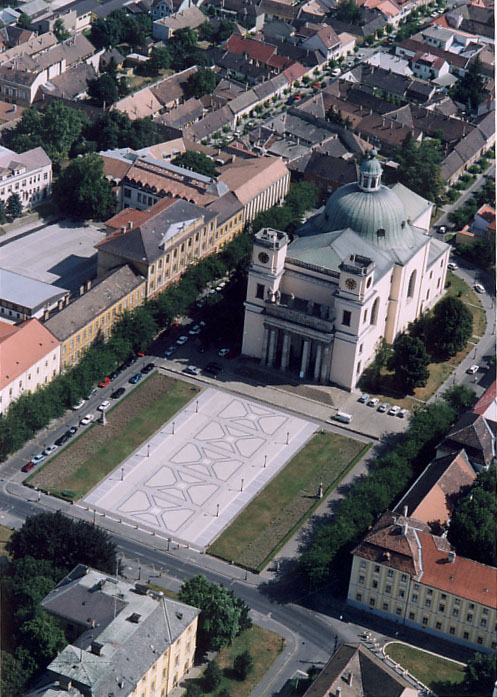
The Cathedral of Vác

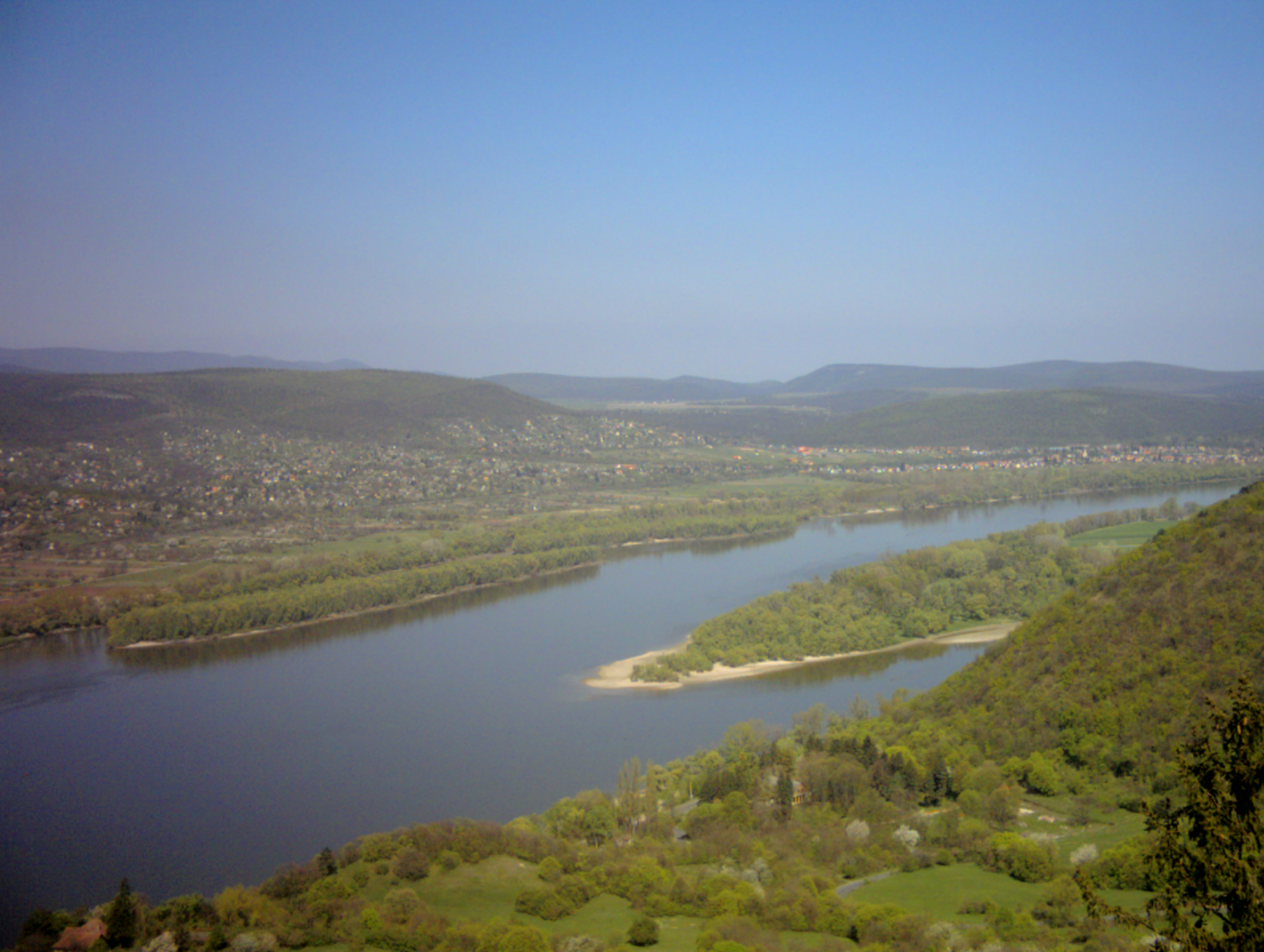
Szentendrei-sziget

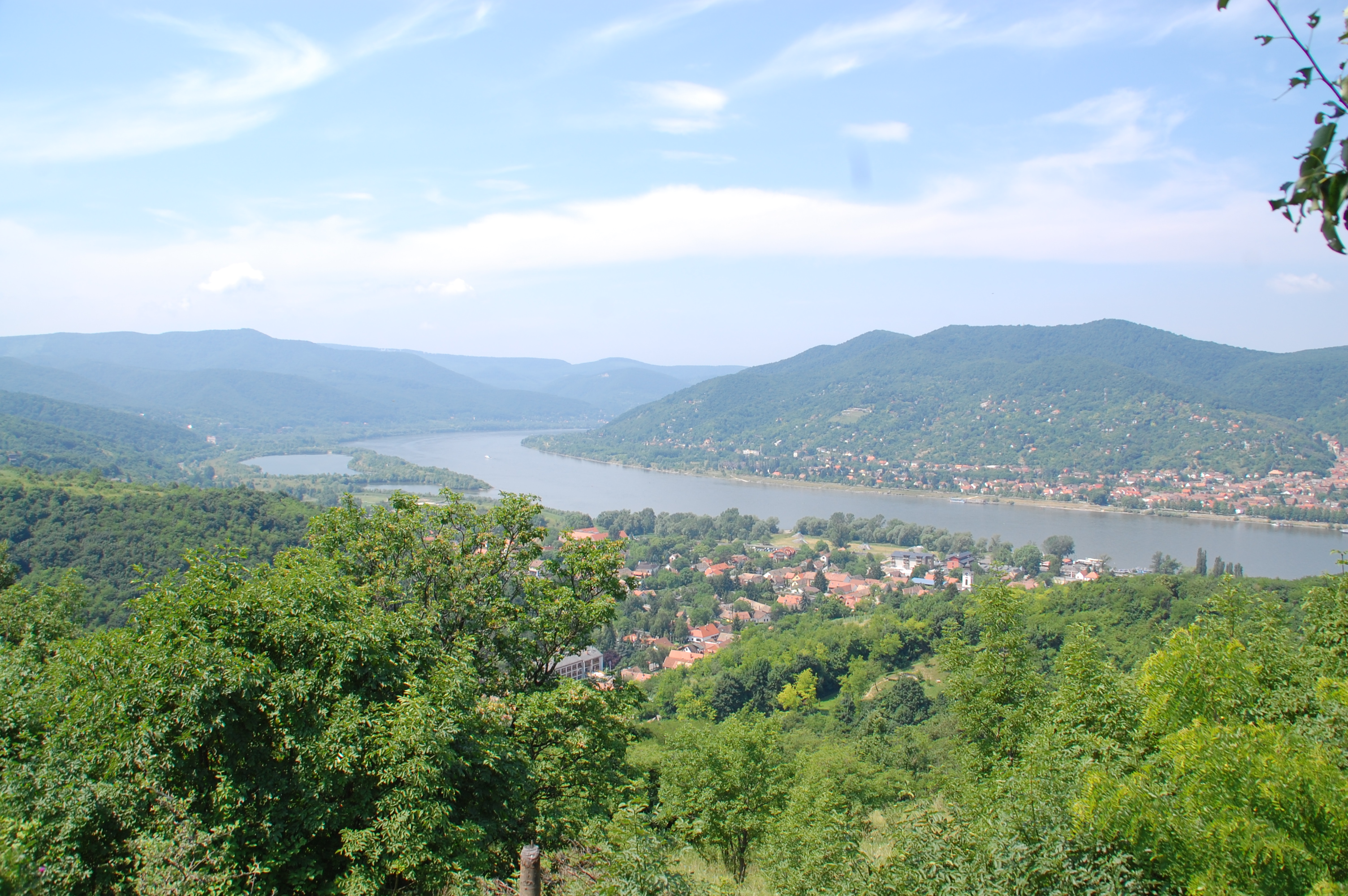
The river near Visegrád

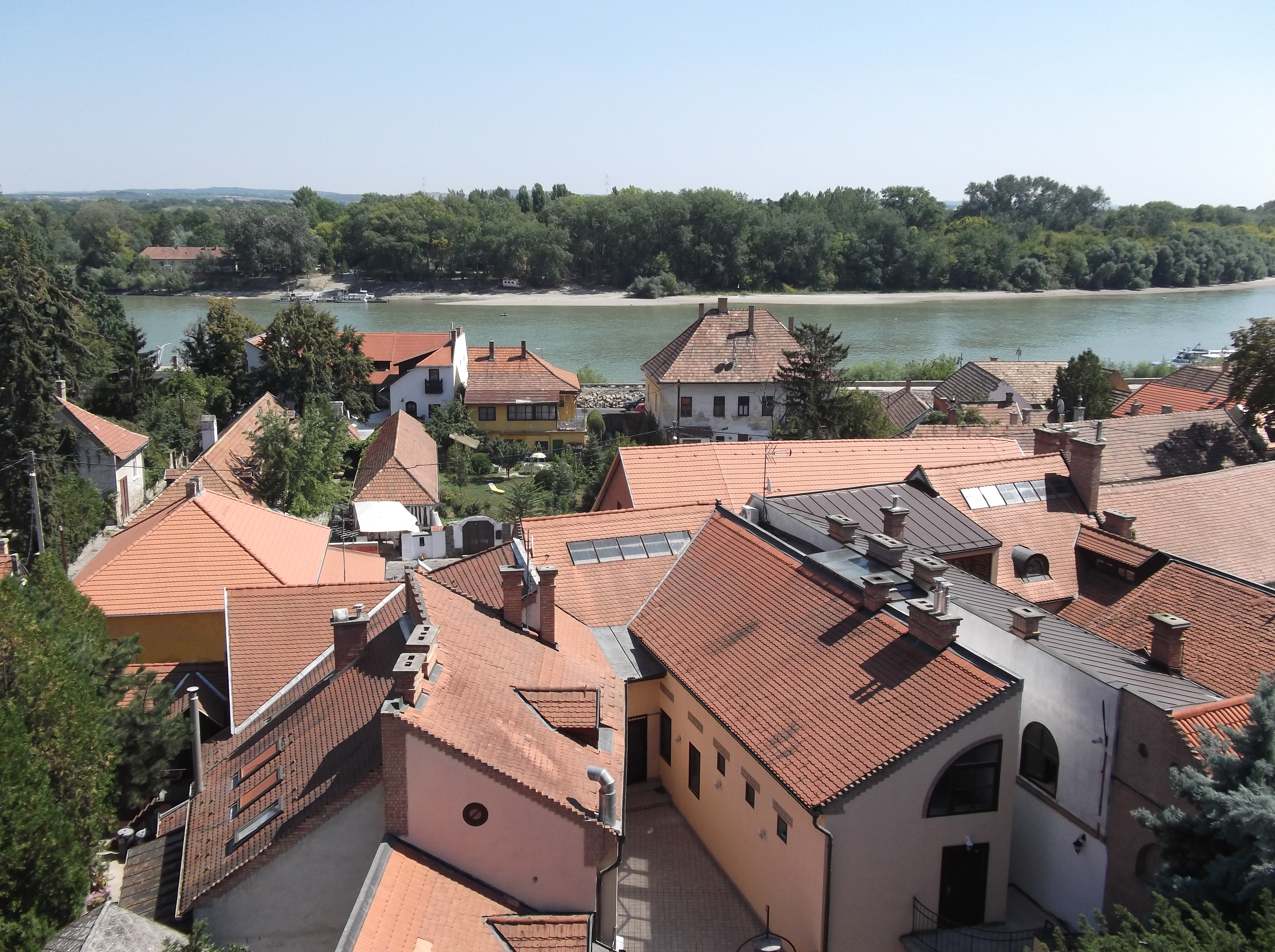
Szentendre

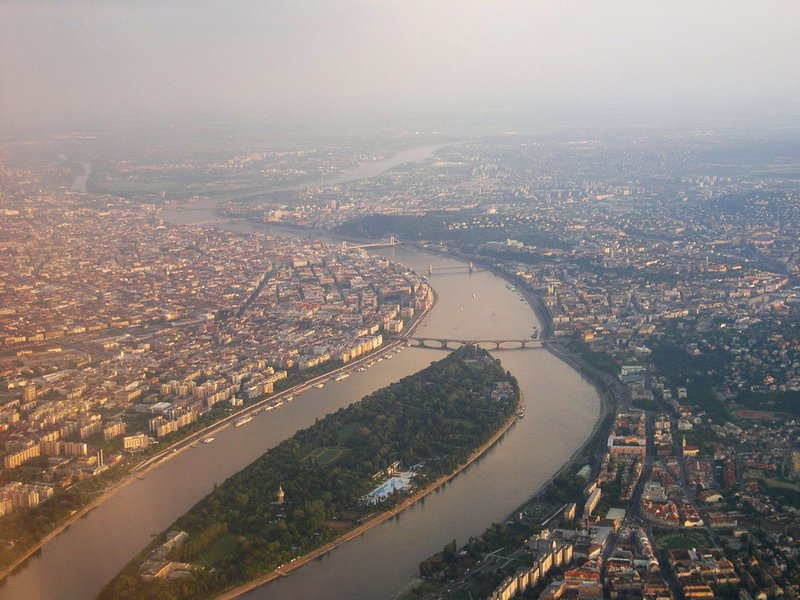
Margaret Island in Budapest

== See also ==
- Geography of Hungary
- Iron Gate (Danube)
