= Velem =

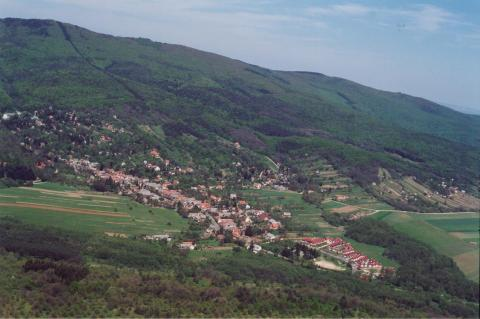

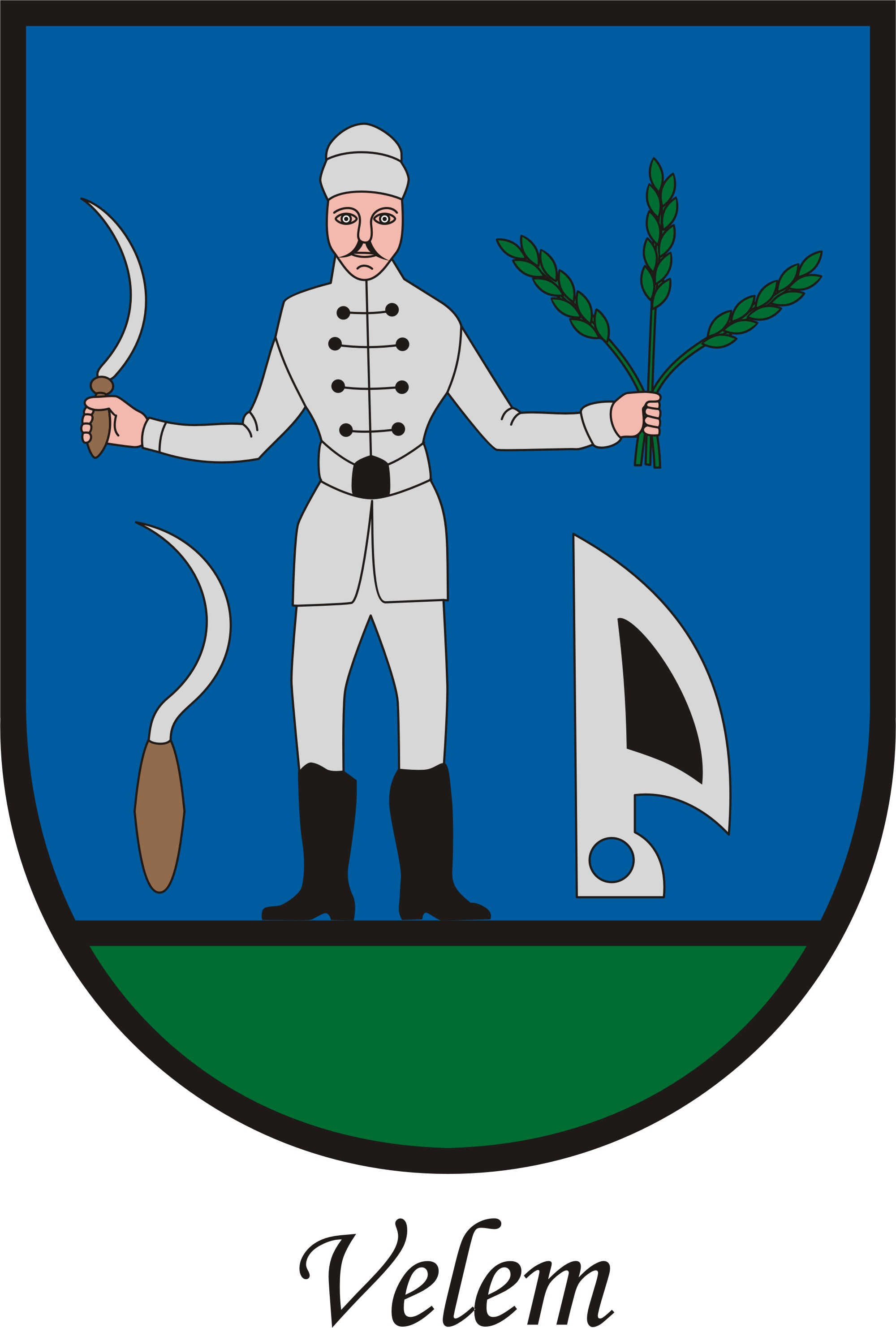
- Coat of arms

- Location of Vas county in Hungary

- Location of Velem
- Coordinates: 47.34472°N 16.49173°E
- Country: Hungary
- Region: Western Transdanubia
- County: Vas
- First mention: 1279

Area
  - Total: 8.61 km^{2} (3.32 sq mi)

Population (2010)
  - Total: 343
  - Density: 39.8/km^{2} (103/sq mi)
- Time zone: UTC+1 (CET)
  - Summer (DST): UTC+2 (CEST)
- Postal code: 9726
- Area code: (+36) 94
- Website: velem.hu

Velem is a village in Vas county, Hungary. The village is situated on the slopes of Kőszeg Mountains, at the westernmost tip of the county and the region known as Alpokalja (Lower Alps). Velem is notable for its picturesque environment and healthy climate.

== History ==
Velem was first mentioned in records in 1279. One of the notable archaeological sights of Central Europe can be found on St. Vid Hill above the village. The church on the top of the hill can be seen from several kilometers away. Owing to the excellent climatic conditions, Velem has become a well-known resort and holiday centre with full infrastructure. In the village, there is a House of Crafts preserving the tradition of local folk arts.

At the end of World War II the Szálasi Government was based in a prominent Velem mansion called the Stirling Villa. The Holy Crown of Hungary was preserved and safeguarded there between 29 December 1944 and 19 March 1945. Today the Stirling Villa is a venue for seminars and conferences while the House of Crafts next door hosts workshops where traditional and almost forgotten crafts can be learnt from experienced craftsmen. Preserving traditions is an organic part of this village where wooden barns stand among houses mainly built of stone and vernacular wine presses with cellars dotted along the Pákó Stream (Pákó-patak).

There is a still operational water mill situated near the village. The starting point of the national 'blue' tourist route is in Velem. The village is situated on the grounds of Írottkő Nature Park with a bicycle route crossing the village. The most frequently visited local event is the Chestnut Feast (Gesztenyeünnep) in October every year.

Year(s)	Castle or lordship where it belonged	Squire(s)	Event	Antecedent	Hungarian King
1279	Saint Vid Castle	Kőszegi (earlier: Németújvári), Miklós	Sharing on estate	Death of Henrik Kőszegi (earlier: Németújvári) in 1274	IV. László (Arpad dynasty)
after 1291	Lordship of Rohonc		Destruction of Saint Vid Castle	The peace treaty of Hainburg in 1291 austrian Duke Albrecht I and hungarian King András III	III. András (Arpad dynasty)
1374	Lordship of Rohonc	Rohonci family (descedents of Miklós Németújvári)			I. Lajos (Anjou)
1404	Lordship of Rohonc	Garai family	Grant	László Nápolyi's performance and expulsion from the country in 1402-1403	Zsigmond (Luxemburg dynasty)
1445		I. Frigyes German emperor occupied Kőszeg and Rohonc	German Occupation	Hungarian defeat against the Turks in the Battle of Varna in 1444	V. László (Habsburg)
1477	Lordship of Rohonc	Pesnitzer, Ulrik	King Matthias's Austrian campaign	Habsburg-Jagello Alliance against Hungarian King. (1476)	I. Mátyás (Hunyadi)
1490	Lordship of Rohonc	Paunkister family	Grant		
from 1527	Lordship of Rohonc	Batthyány family	Grant	I. Ferdinand (Habsburg)	

== Archaeology ==
Velem and its surroundings were already inhabited in the Neolithic. The remains of a Bronze Age fortified settlement dating from the 16th century BC have also been excavated. The settlement controlled a significant trade route passing through the mountains. Due to the copper and antimony found nearby, a metal processing and metalworking centre of outstanding importance was formed besides the fortification. One of the most spectacular results of the excavations is a gold diadem dating from the 14th-9th centuries BC, during the Urnfield culture period. Further excavations have been carried out since 1973 by staff at the Savaria Museum, in which, in addition to the citadel, residential buildings on the terraces on the east and south sides of the mountain have been excavated.

== Notable residents ==
Mari Törőcsik, a major Hungarian actress.
Gyula Maár, a noted film director and husband of Mari Törőcsik.
