= Kursalón, Sklené Teplice =

Monument in Sklené Teplice, Slovakia

Coordinates: 48°31′40.7″N 18°51′48.3″E

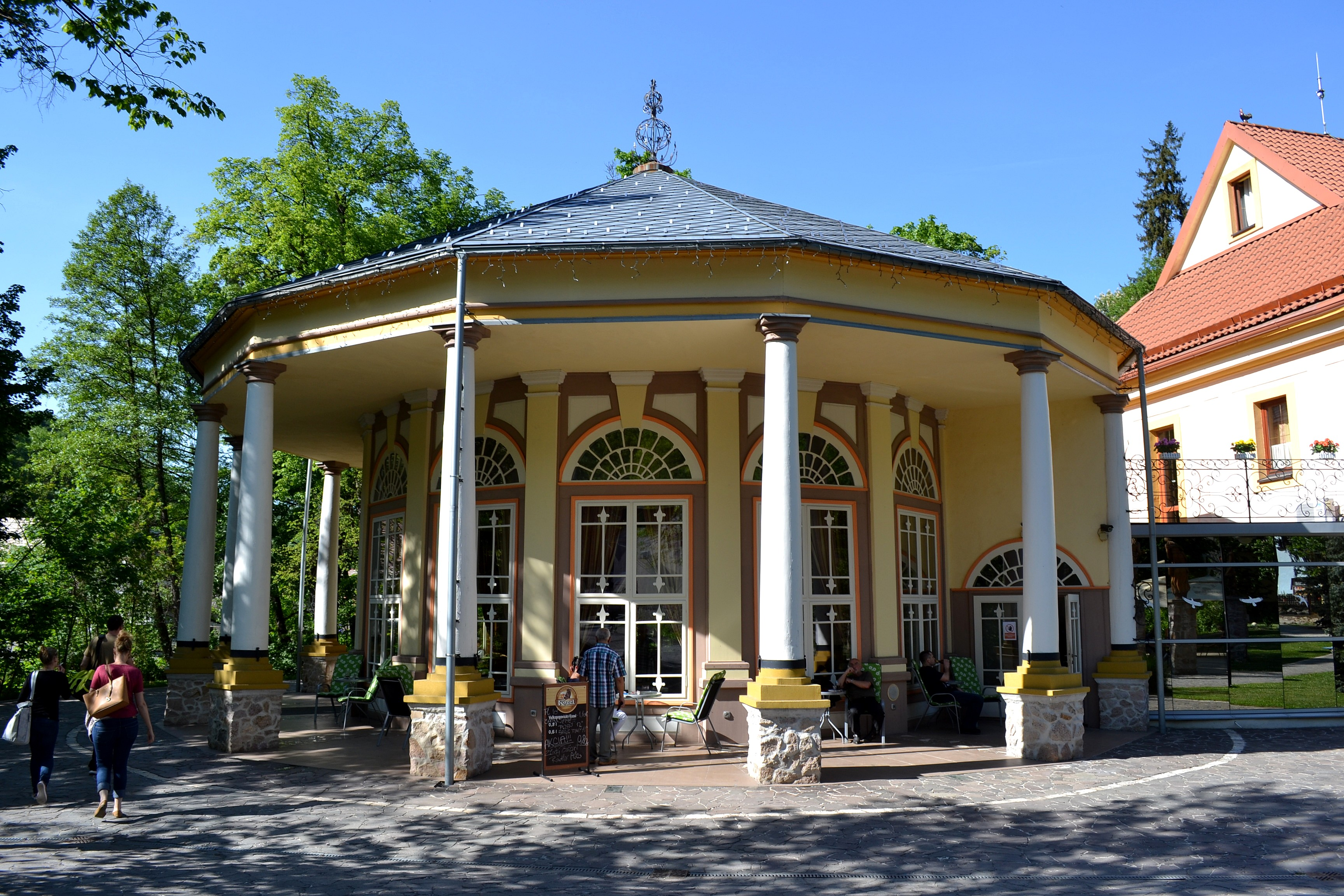
Kursalón

Kursalón is a cultural and historical monument in Sklené Teplice, Slovakia.

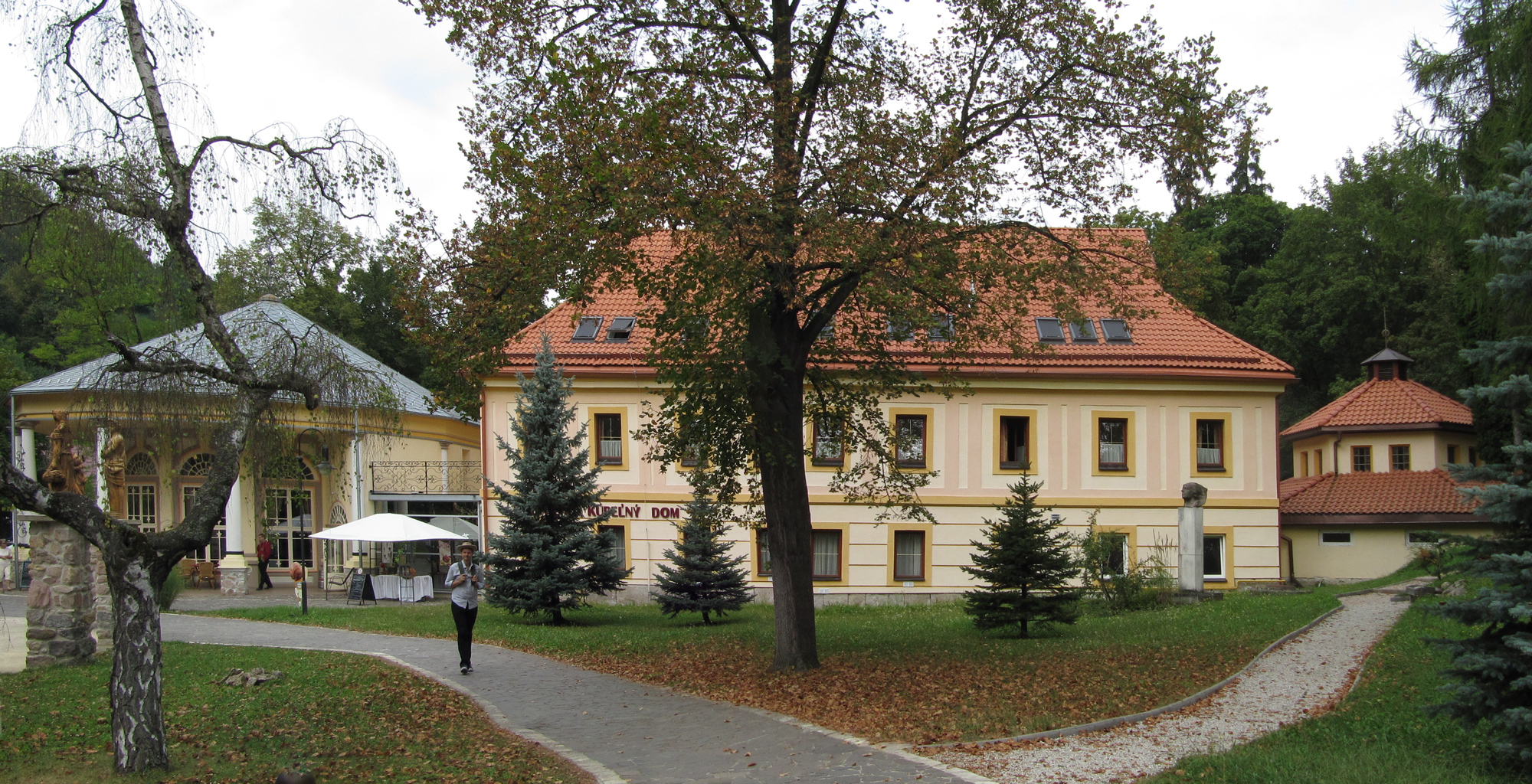
Kursalón and Thermal Baths "Goethe" in Sklene Teplice, 2011

== History ==
=== Construction ===
In June 1836, Jozef Lentz, the new tenant farmer of a spa in Sklené Teplice, came up with a project to build a conversational room where the spa's visitors could gather, and offered to finance the building. The mining house sent Lentz's project to the Dvorska house in Budin. Ferdinand Divald checked the budget and calculated costs. In November, the Dvorska house requested sending the diagonal cut of the building and ratification of the building material and wages of the workers through the mining court. The Dvorska house was given the okay to build Kursalón on April 18, 1837.

Preparation to build the saloon started in 1837, and construction began in the spring of 1838. Some problems arose during construction; there was a wide orbiculate roof from which streams of water fell down when the weather was rainy. Inconveniently used wood was placed in such a way that planks stuck out and the saloon often needed repair by carpenters and cabinetmakers. The building was equipped with copper gutters and painted varnish.

In July 1839, the main chamber's earl Emil Rombauer announced the upcoming end of work. Lentz, tenant farmers, and officers of seigniory Šašo took over on July 31, 1839.

=== Reconstruction ===
The saloon was reconstructed in 2007. The reconstructed Kursalón is situated 15 metres from its original place, due to balance and erosion problems at the original site. The windows and outside pillars from the original building were preserved. Pillars with statues that represent the four seasons make the quondam foundation of the saloon now. The reconstruction of Kursalón was overseen by Ing. Peter Podoba.

== UPG Project ==
This building will be modelled in 3D graphic program trueSpace.

== Sources ==
- Život v Sklených Tepliciach, December 2007
- archival documents from the State mining archive in Banská Štiavnica
