= Sklené Teplice =

Sklené Teplice Szklenófürdő
- Municipality
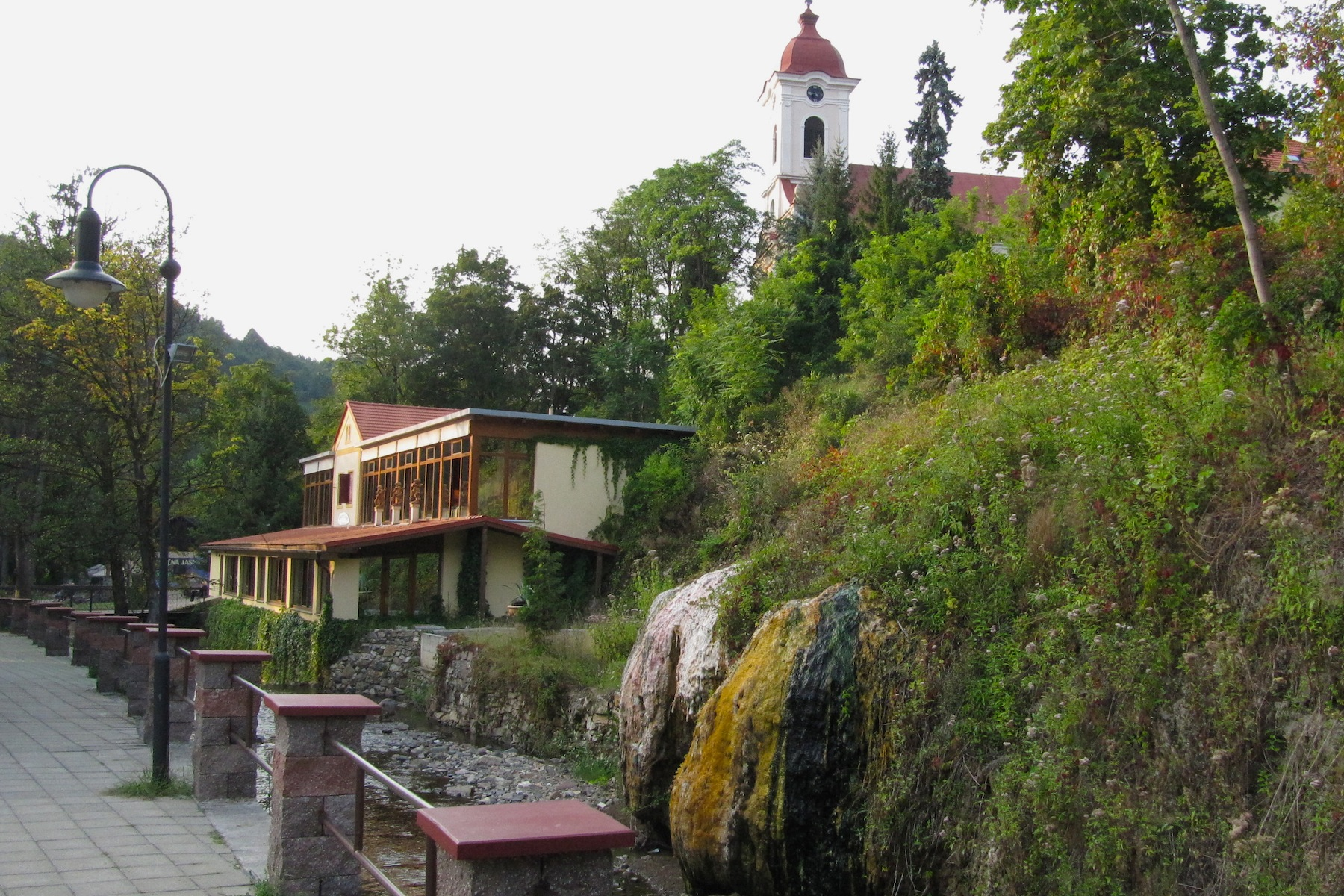
- Teplá Brook, hot springs and the Roman Catholic Church of St. Luke

- Flag

- Location of Sklené Teplice in the Banská Bystrica Region Location of Sklené Teplice in Slovakia
- Coordinates: 48.53°N 18.87°E
- Country: Slovakia
- Region: Banská Bystrica Region
- District: Žiar nad Hronom District
- First mentioned: 1340

Government
  - Mayor: Ľubomír Meliš (SMER–SD)

Area
  - Total: 10.91 km^{2} (4.21 sq mi)
- Elevation: 345 m (1,132 ft)

Population (2025)
  - Total: 373

Population by ethnicity (2011)
  - Slovak: 96.6%
  - Hungarian: 0.2%
  - Czech: 0.2%
  - Unreported: 3%

Population by religion (2011)
  - Roman Catholic: 79.1%
  - Lutheran: 0.7%
  - Methodist: 0.2%
  - Others: 0.7%
  - Non-religious: 11.0%
  - Unreported: 8.3%
- Time zone: UTC+1 (CET)
  - Summer (DST): UTC+2 (CEST)
- Postal code: 966 03
- Area code: +421 45
- Vehicle registration plate (until 2022): ZH
- Website: www.sklene-teplice.sk

Sklené Teplice (German: Glasshütte, Hungarian: Szklenófürdő) is a small spa village and municipality in Žiar nad Hronom District in the Banská Bystrica Region of central Slovakia. It is close to the historic town of Banská Štiavnica.

== History ==
In historical records the village was mentioned for the first time in 1340 and was founded by Glaser Filius Gerhardi de Doplicze. Historical records for the spa come from 1549 in the chronicles of Juraj Wernher.

The first spa was built in this valley in 1701. Aristocratic travelers from across Europe visited the site. The spa community achieved prominence on August 27, 1786 when the world's first academic scientific congress was held here. The congress was attended by notable intellectuals, including Johann Wolfgang von Goethe. The current spa complex dates from the early 1900s.

== Geography ==
The municipality lies at an altitude of 345 metres (1,132 ft) and covers an area of 10.91 km^{2} (4.21 sq mi) (2025).

== Population ==
Population statistic (10 years)
Year	1995	2005	2015	2025
Count	451	433	407	373
Difference		−3.99%	−6.00%	−8.35%

Population statistic
Year	2024	2025
Count	368	373
Difference		+1.35%

It has a population of 373 people (31 December 2025).

=== Ethnicity ===
Census 2021 (1+ %)
Ethnicity	Number	Fraction
Slovak	373	98.15%
Not found out	4	1.05%
Total	380	

In year 2021 was 380 people by ethnicity 373 as Slovak, 4 as Not found out, 2 as German, 1 as Czech and 1 as Hungarian.

Note on population: The difference values of population numbers in the table "Population statistic" and in the sections "Ethnicity" & "Religion" is caused by the use of various statistical methods.

=== Religion ===
Census 2021 (1+ %)
Religion	Number	Fraction
Roman Catholic Church	269	70.79%
None	89	23.42%
Ad hoc movements	7	1.84%
Evangelical Church	5	1.32%
Not found out	4	1.05%
Total	380	

In year 2021 was 380 people by religion 269 from Roman Catholic Church, 89 from None, 7 from Ad hoc movements, 5 from Evangelical Church, 4 from Not found out, 2 from Other, 2 from Greek Catholic Church and 2 from Buddhism.

== Points of interest ==
- Kursalón, Sklené Teplice
