= Kőszeg Mountains =

Mountain range in Austria and Hungary

Coordinates: 47°21′36.80″N 16°24′34.03″E

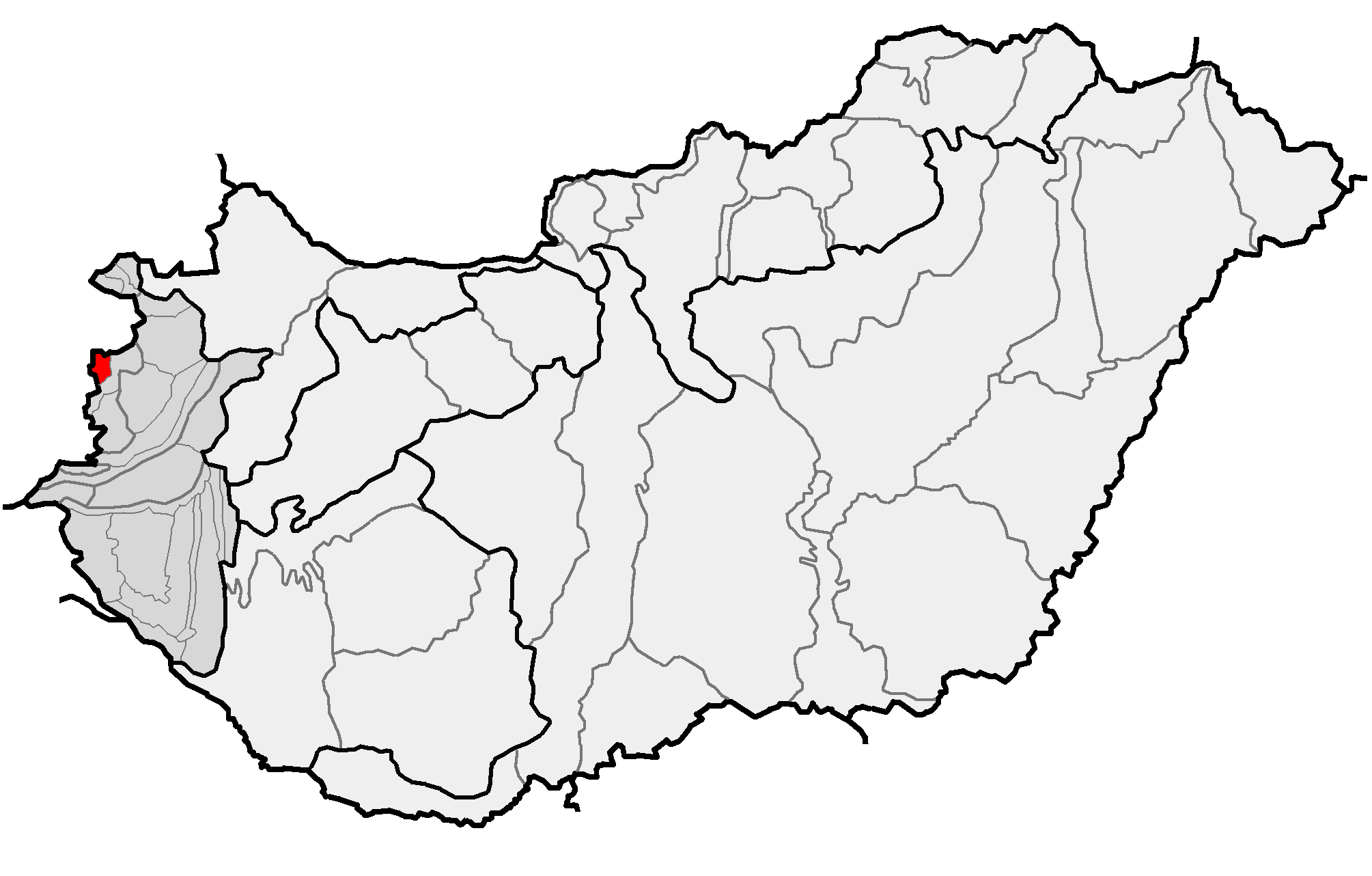
Location of Kőszeg Mountains (in red) within physical subdivisions of Hungary

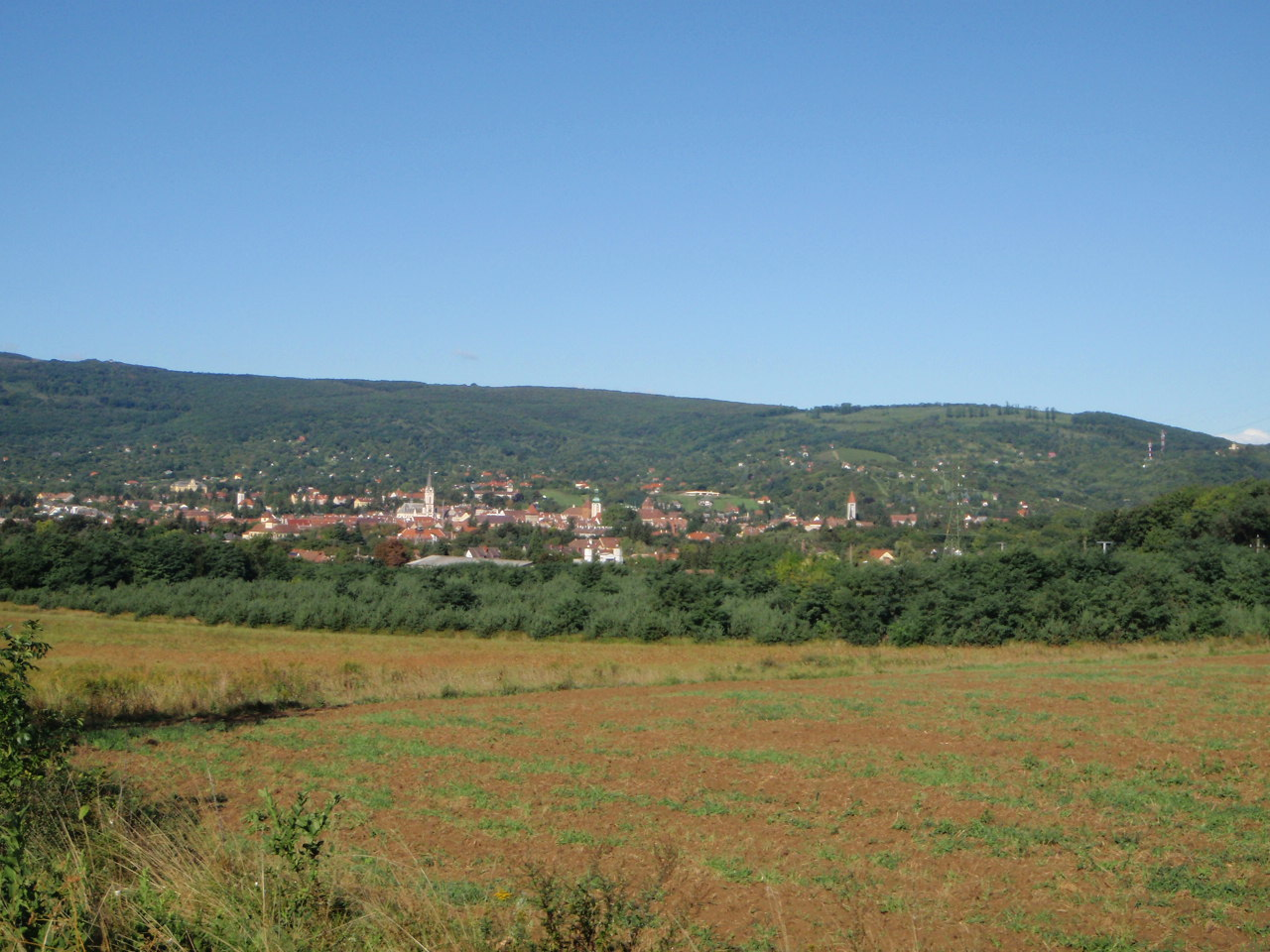
Town of Kőszeg

The Kőszeg Mountains [ˈkøːsɛɡ], sometimes called the Guns or Güns Mountains (German: Günser Gebirge, Hungarian: Kőszegi-hegység), are a mountain range in the Alpokalja area, the easternmost region of the Alps. The territory of the range is shared between Austria and Hungary. Geologically, the mountains represent a Penninic window, formed from metamorphic rocks transformed about 28–31 million years ago and uplifted between 15–18 million years ago. The landscape features a main north-south ridge with multiple east-west tributary ridges, creating a distinctive pattern of parallel valleys shaped by streams flowing eastward toward the Gyöngyös. The mountain range's hydrology includes a network of permanent and intermittent streams that have shaped the terrain through erosion and occasional flash floods. The varied habitats of the Kőszeg Mountains support rich biodiversity, including dozens of species of soil-dwelling enchytraeid worms and orthopteran insects (grasshoppers and crickets), with distinct species assemblages corresponding to different vegetation types from wet meadows to xeric grasslands.

== Geology and topography ==
The Kőszeg Mountains represent the easternmost extension of the Alps and have a distinctive geological composition. They formed from rocks that underwent metamorphic transformation about 28–31 million years ago (mya), with the mountains themselves being uplifted between 15.1–18.5 mya. The range is primarily composed of various types of phyllite (a shiny foliated metamorphic rock) including quartz phyllite, calcareous phyllite, and black lead phyllite, along with metaconglomerate (transformed sedimentary rock consisting of rounded pebbles cemented together).

Geologically, the Kőszeg Mountains belong to the Penninic unit of the Alpine system, and are specifically part of what geologists call the Rechnitz window group, representing the easternmost outcrop of this unit. The mountains show evidence of multiple metamorphic events, particularly a low-temperature/high-pressure blueschist facies Alpine event that was later overprinted by a medium-pressure greenschist facies metamorphism. While the age of the earlier high-pressure event remains undetermined, K–Ar dating on muscovite from the mountains' phyllites indicates that the later medium-pressure metamorphic event occurred approximately 28–31 mya during the meso-Alpine period.

The landscape of the Kőszeg Mountains on the Hungarian side features one main ridge running north-south, with multiple smaller ridges branching off to the east. These east-west tributary ridges formed as streams carved valleys while retreating westward from the Gyöngyös stream, which flows along the eastern edge of the mountains. This process created a series of parallel valleys separated by these smaller ridges.

The elevation of the mountains is relatively modest, with the main ridge reaching heights between 400–500 metres above sea level. The town of Kőszeg sits at the eastern foot of the northern portion of the main ridge, partly on the plain of the Gyöngyös Stream (at elevations of 272–275 metres) and partly on the gentle slopes rising toward the mountains (elevations between 275–400 metres). This sloping surface represents what geologists call a "residual pediment" – a gently inclined erosional surface at the foot of the mountains that has been shaped by streams depositing sediment to form a fan-like structure known as a "bajada" in the mountain foreland.

The mountains feature several distinctive topographical features, including flat-topped ridges formed by stream capture (where one stream diverts the flow of another), interesting rock formations exposed by erosion, and step-like features on valley slopes. The southern part of the range has a particular structure of rock layers tilting toward the south, which influences how erosion shapes the landscape.

== Hydrology ==
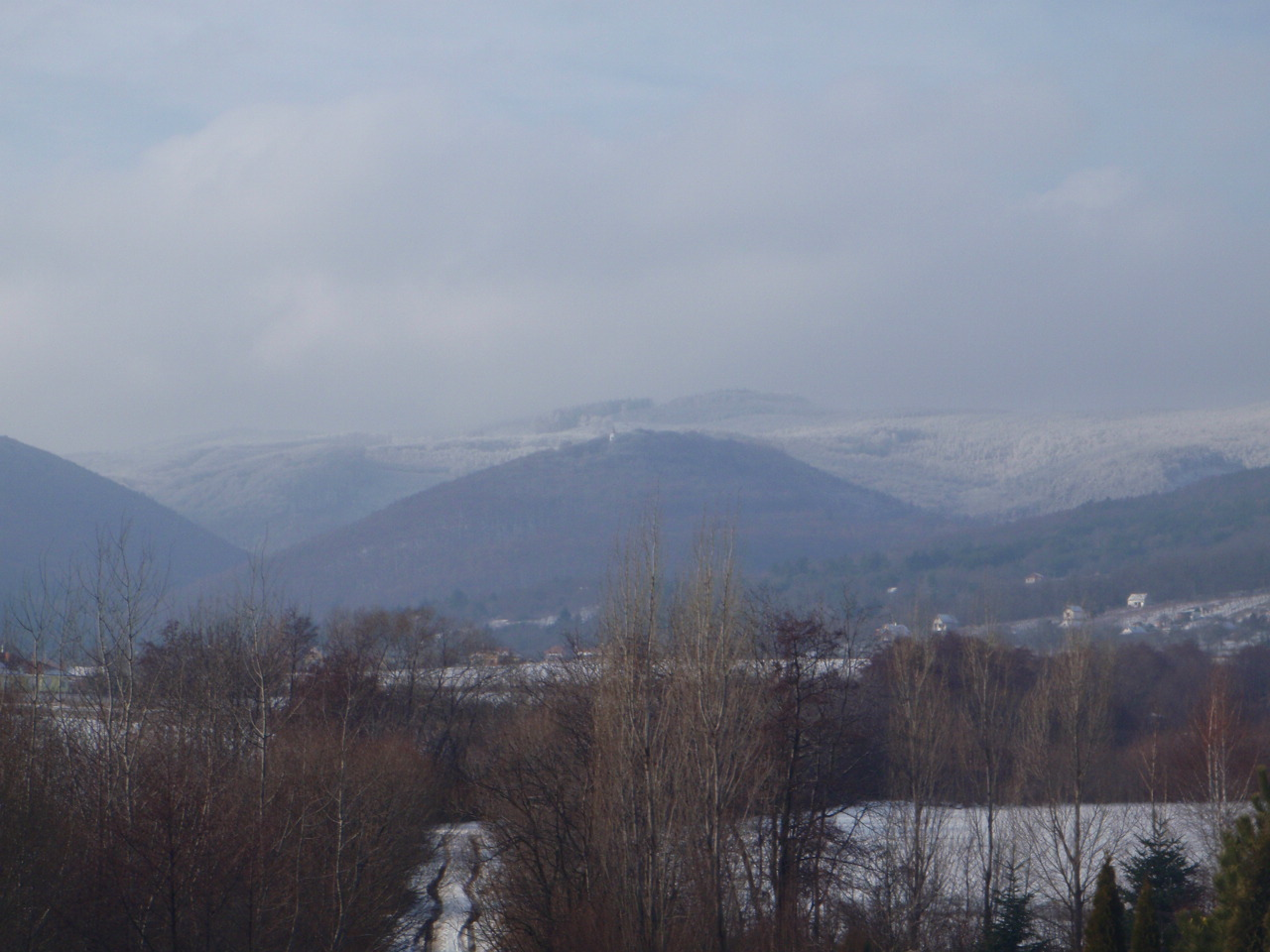
Kőszeg Mountains at Velem, viewed from Mount Ró

The water systems of the Kőszeg Mountains are characterised by a network of streams and springs that have played a significant role in shaping the landscape. The Gyöngyös stream is the main watercourse along the eastern boundary of the mountains, collecting water from numerous smaller streams that flow eastward from the main ridge. These mountain streams, though relatively small, are powerful shapers of the landscape, especially during periods of heavy rainfall. The area experiences both permanent streams with year-round flow and intermittent streams that appear primarily during rainfall events or snowmelt. Springs in the region include the Szénégető spring and the Szikla spring, which contribute to the local water system. The pattern of water flow in the mountains follows the topography, with streams generally flowing eastward from the main ridge toward the Gyöngyös Stream. This drainage pattern has created a series of parallel valleys separated by smaller ridges. The valleys themselves often feature stepped profiles, where alternating flat sections and steeper drops reflect the underlying geological structure and the erosive power of the water.

Research conducted after intensive rainfall events in 2009 and 2010 demonstrated how quickly these mountain streams can transform during flash floods. During these events, channels deepened by as much as 70 centimetres in some areas, and stream paths changed significantly. The power of these water flows became evident as they transported large amounts of sediment, creating alluvial fans (fan-shaped deposits of sediment) both within channels and at valley mouths. The hydrology of the area has direct implications for nearby settlements, particularly the town of Kőszeg, which sits at the eastern foot of the mountains. During heavy rainfall events, the town has experienced flooding and sediment deposition as water and soil material flow down from the mountain slopes along stream valleys.

Researchers note that while the exhumation mechanism and history of the Kőszeg-Rechnitz Window are well understood, detailed quantitative measurements of the pressure-temperature conditions during the mountains' formation and precise dating of the oldest high-pressure metamorphic event are still lacking for the Hungarian portion of these formations.

== Biodiversity ==
The Kőszeg Mountains host a diverse array of flora and fauna adapted to the region's particular climatic conditions. A 2017 study documented a rich enchytraeid fauna (small white soil-dwelling annelid worms) comprising 59 species across 15 genera, along with two other annelid species. The mountain range's biodiversity shows similarities to that of the Rax mountains in the northern Alps of Austria, with the presence of several subalpine and alpine species. Some species found in the Kőszeg Mountains, such as Fridericia discifera, F. raxiensis, and Euenchytraeus clarae, are considered possible relicts from the Ice Age. The region's varied habitats support different species compositions, with the most species-rich sites being an alder carr (wetland forest) at a creekside near Paprét (33 species) and a mesophile montane hay meadow at Steirer Houses (27 species).

The Kőszeg Mountains support rich insect diversity, with a wide variety of orthopteran (grasshopper and cricket) species adapted to the region's diverse habitats. A 2002 study documented 40 Orthoptera species distributed across the mountain range's various microhabitats. These species form distinct assemblages corresponding to five main habitat types: xeric grasslands, humid and mesic meadows, mountain grasslands, clear-cuts, and ecotone zones. The research revealed that habitat characteristics — particularly vegetation height, humidity levels, and total plant coverage — significantly influence species distribution. Vegetation structural diversity (or patchiness) correlates positively with grasshopper species richness, highlighting the importance of habitat heterogeneity for biodiversity conservation. Some orthopteran species serve as biological indicators for specific environmental conditions, with certain species showing strong preferences for either moist or dry conditions. The most diverse orthopteran communities were found in transitions between habitat types.

== See also ==
- Geography of Hungary
- Alpokalja
- Güns (disambiguation)
