= Unterkohlstätten =

- Municipality
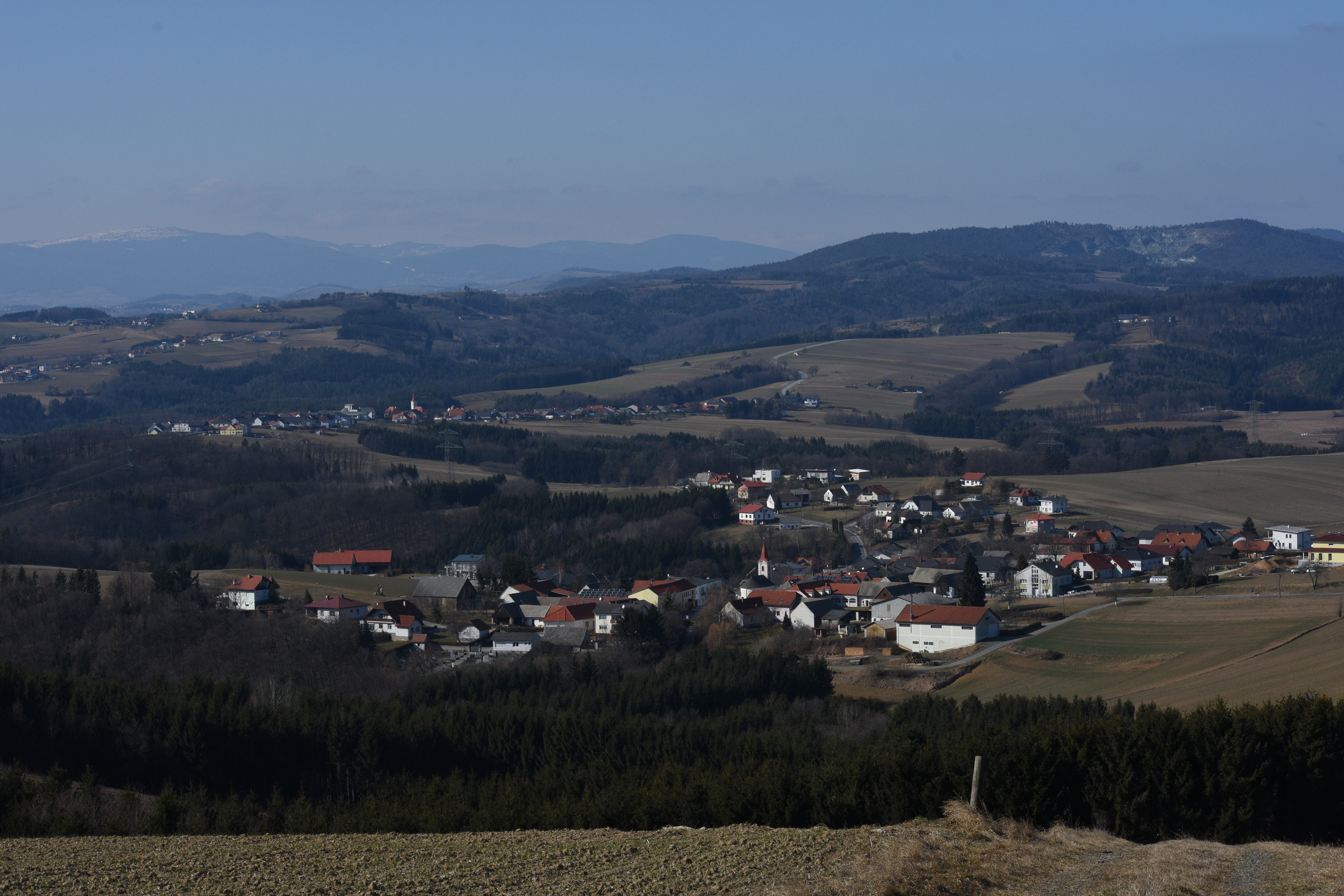
- View of Unterkohlstätten

- Coat of arms

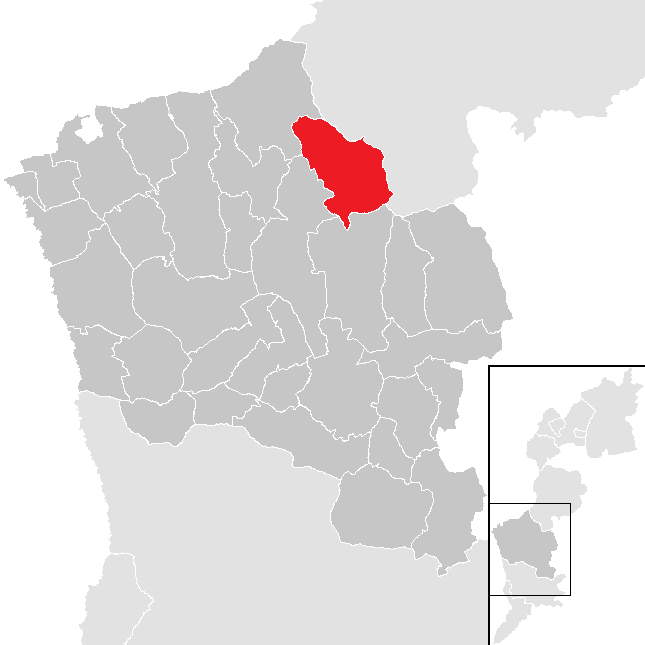
- Location within Oberwart district

- Location within Austria
- Coordinates: 47°23′N 16°19′E
- Country: Austria
- State: Burgenland
- District: Oberwart

Government
  - Mayor: Christian Pinzker

Area
  - Total: 29.14 km^{2} (11.25 sq mi)
- Elevation: 503 m (1,650 ft)

Population (2018-01-01)
  - Total: 1,029
  - Density: 35.31/km^{2} (91.46/sq mi)
- Time zone: UTC+1 (CET)
  - Summer (DST): UTC+2 (CEST)
- Postal code: 7435
- Website: www.unterkohlstaetten.at

Unterkohlstätten (Hungarian: Alsószénégető) is a town in the district of Oberwart in the Austrian state of Burgenland.

== Population ==
Historical population
Year	Pop.	±%
1869	1,455	—
1880	1,542	+6.0%
1890	1,553	+0.7%
1900	1,538	−1.0%
1910	1,454	−5.5%
1923	1,445	−0.6%
1934	1,578	+9.2%
1939	1,582	+0.3%
1951	1,231	−22.2%
1961	1,196	−2.8%
1971	1,135	−5.1%
1981	1,144	+0.8%
1991	1,152	+0.7%
2001	1,103	−4.3%
2011	1,032	−6.4%
