= List of rivers of Hungary =

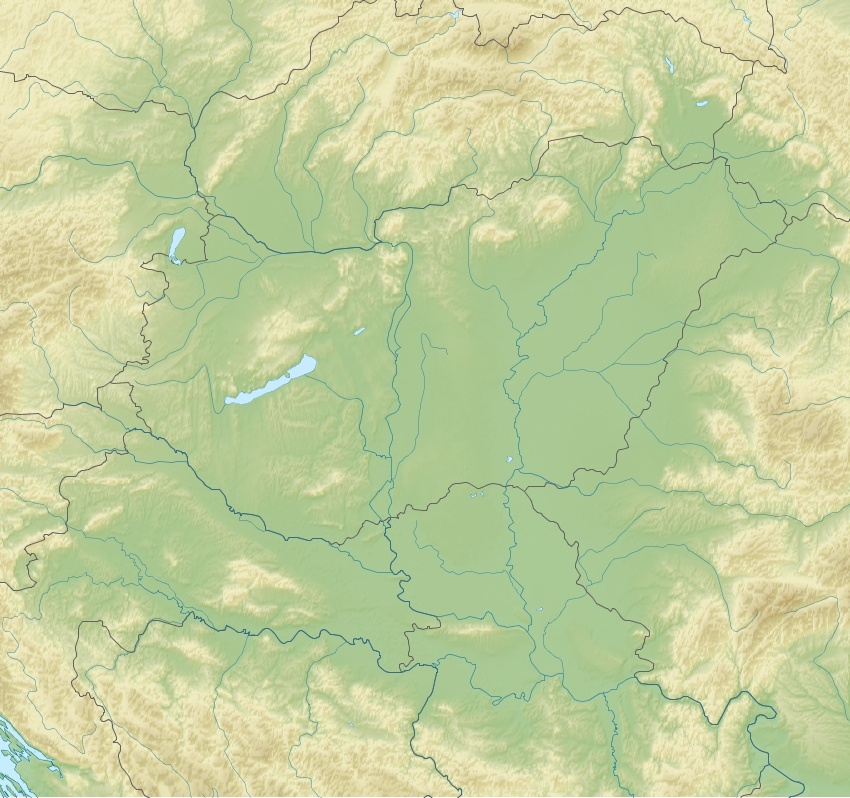
Map of lakes and rivers in the Carpathian Basin

Some of the Rivers of Hungary include:

== Rivers by length ==
(> 100 km, only the length in Hungary)

1. Tisza - 597 km - 62,06% of total length
2. Danube (Duna) - 417 km – 14,60% of total length
3. Körös - 217.5 km
  1. triple Körös (Hármas-Körös) - 91.3 km – 100% of total length
  2. double Körös (Kettős-Körös) - 37.3 km – 100% of total length
    1. Crișul Negru (Fekete-Körös) - 20.5 km – 12.20% of total length
    2. Crișul Alb (Fehér-Körös) - 9.8 km – 4.16% of total length
  3. Crișul Repede (Sebes-Körös) - 58.6 km – 28.04% of total length
4. Rába - 188 km – 66,43% of total length
5. Zagyva - 179 km – 100% of total length
6. Hortobágy-Berettyó - 167.3 km – 100% of total length
7. Drava (Dráva) - 166.8 km – 22,27% of total length
8. Ipeľ (Ipoly) - 143 km – 61.51% of total length
9. Zala - 126 km – 100% of total length
10. Sajó - 125.1 km – 56.10% of total length
11. Répce and Rábca together - 123.7 km
12. Hornád (Hernád) - 118 km – 41.26% of total length
13. Kapos - 112.7 km – 100% of total length
14. Tarna - 105 km – 100% of total length
15. Marcal - 100.4 km – 100% of total length

== Rivers by drainage area ==
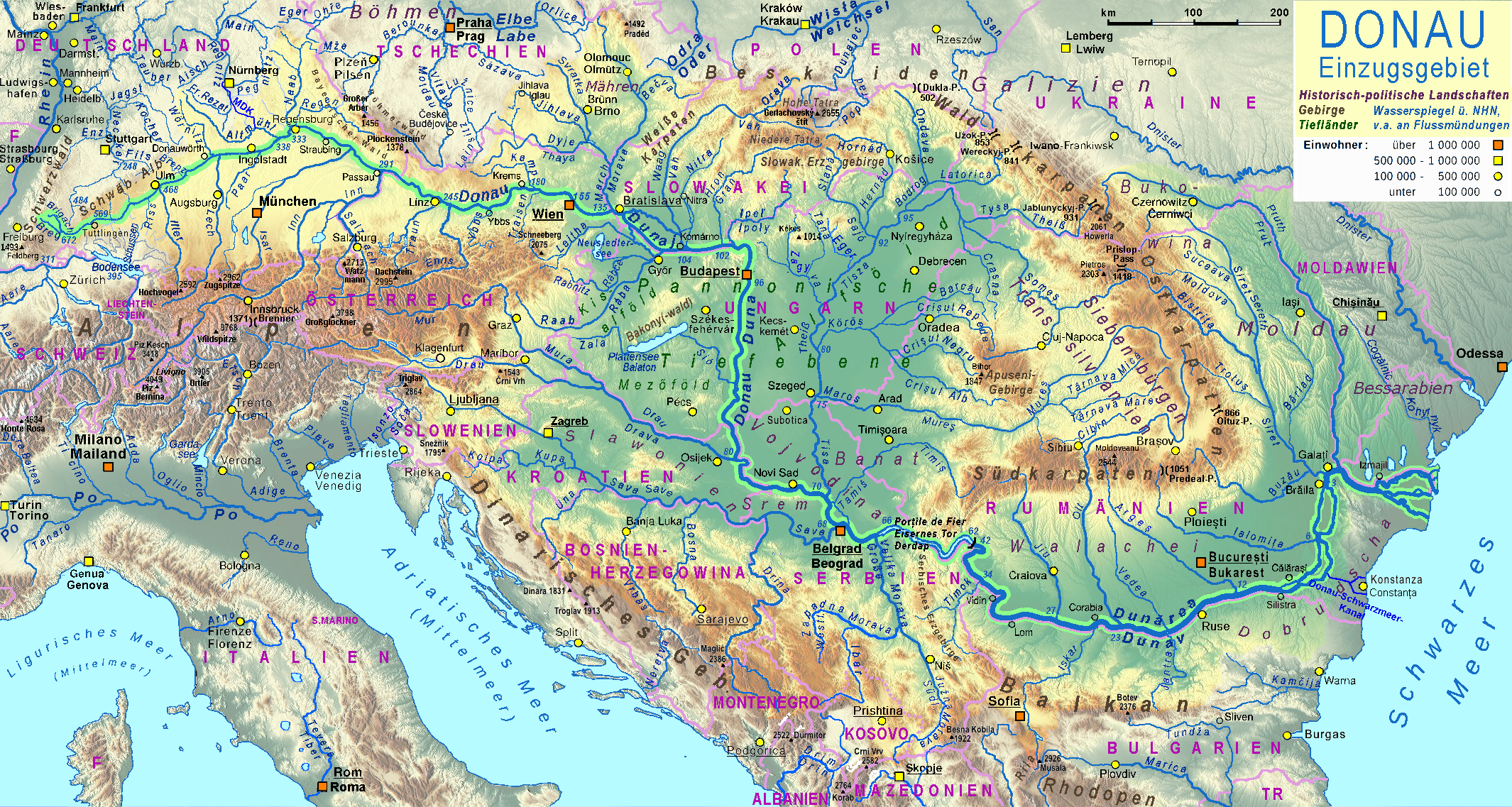
Basin of the River Danube

(> 1000 km^{2}, only the area in Hungary)

Danube (Duna) - 93,030 km² – 11,7% of total basin

- Rába -
  - Marcal - 3,033 km² – 100% of total basin
- Ipeľ (Ipoly) - 1,518 km² – 29.72% of total basin
- Sió - 14,953 km² – 100% of total basin
  - Kapos - 3,170 km² – 100% of total basin
- Drava (Dráva) - 8,215.22 km² – 19% of total basin
- Tisza - 46,000 km² – 29,27% of total basin
  - Sajó - 5,545 km² – 43,63% of total basin
    - Hornád (Hernád) - 1,136 km² – 20,90% of total basin
  - Zagyva - 5,677 km² – 100% of total basin
    - Tarna - 2,116 km² – 100% of total basin
  - Körös - 12,942.39 km² – 47% of total basin

Balaton from (Zala river and others) – 5,181 km²

== Rivers by average discharge ==
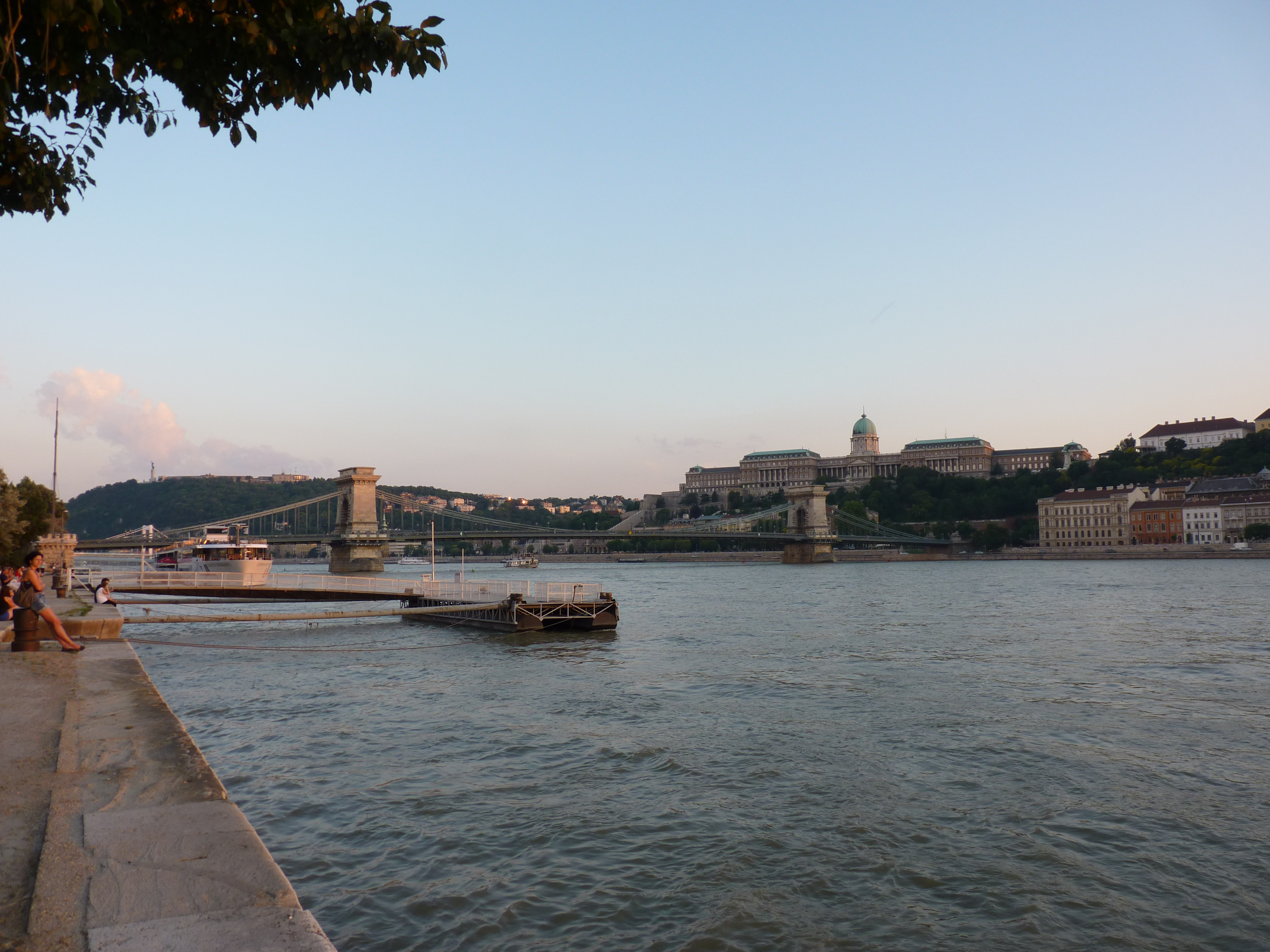
Danube at Budapest

(> 10 m^{3}/s, this list includes not only in Hungary)

1. Danube (Duna) - 6855 m³/s – in Budapest 2350 m³/s
2. Tisza - 820 m³/s
3. Drava (Dráva) - 670 m³/s
4. Mureș (Maros) - 184 m³/s
5. Mur (Mura) - 166 m³/s
6. Bodrog - 115 m³/s
7. Someș (Szamos) - 114 m³/s
8. Körös (Hármas-Körös) - 100 m³/s
9. Sajó - 60 m³/s
10. Sió - 39 m³/s
11. Hornád (Hernád) - 30.9 m³/s
12. Crișul Repede (Sebes-Körös) - 25.4 m³/s
13. Rába - 18 m³/s

== Rivers by orography ==
Rivers that flow into other rivers are sorted by the proximity of their points of confluence to the sea (the lower in the list, the more upstream).

=== Black Sea ===
The rivers in this section are sorted north-west (Austria) to south (Croatia-Serbia).

- Danube/Duna (main branch at Sulina, Romania)
  - Mosoni-Duna - branch of Danube
    - Leitha/Lajta (in Mosonmagyaróvár) R
    - Rábca (near Győr) R
    - Rába (in Győr) R
      - Marcal (near Gyirmót) R
      - Pinka (near Körmend) L
      - Lafnitz/Lapincs (near Szentgotthárd) L
  - Concó (near Ács) R
  - Által-ér (in Dunaalmás) R
  - Ipeľ/Ipoly (near Szob) L
  - Kiskunsági main channel (near Tass) L
  - Sió (in Gemenc Forest) R
    - Sárvíz (in Sióagárd) L
      - Séd (in Cece) R
    - Kapos (near Tolnanémeti) R
  - Sugovica (in Baja) L
  - Drava/Dráva (near Osijek, Croatia) R
    - Mur/Mura (near Legrad, Croatia) L
      - Big Krka/Kerka (near Muraszemenye) L
        - Ledava/Ledva (near Muraszemenye) R
        - Cserta (near Kerkateskánd) L
          - Lower Válicka/Alsó-Valicka (near Páka) L
  - Tisza (near Titel, Serbia) L
    - Túr (near Szatmárcseke) L
    - Someș/Szamos (near Vásárosnamény) L
    - Crasna/Kraszna (in Vásárosnamény) L
    - Bodrog (in Tokaj) R
      - Roňava/Ronyva (near Sátoraljaújhely) R
    - Keleti main channel (near Tiszalök) L
    - Sajó (near Tiszaújváros) R
      - Takta (near Kesznyéten) L
      - Hornád/Hernád (near Sajóhídvég) L
      - Szinva (in Miskolc) R
      - Bódva (near Boldva) L
    - Zagyva (in Szolnok) R
      - Tarna (near Jászjákóhalma) L
      - Galga (near Jászfényszaru) R
    - Hármas-Körös (in Csongrád) L
      - Hortobágy-Berettyó (near Mezőtúr) R
      - Crișul Repede/Sebes-Körös (near Körösladány) R
        - Barcău/Berettyó (near Szeghalom) R
    - Kettős-Körös (continuation of Hármas-Körös)
      - Crișul Negru/Fekete-Körös (near Gyula)
      - Crișul Alb/Fehér-Körös (near Gyula)
    - Mureș/Maros (near Szeged) L

=== Lake Balaton ===
The rivers in this section are sorted north-west to south-west.

- Zala (near Balatonszentgyörgy)
  - Upper Válicka/Felső-Valicka (near Zalaegerszeg) R

== Alphabetical list ==
Berettyó, Bodrog, Bodva, Dráva/Drava, Hernád, Fehér-Körös, Fekete-Körös, Ipoly, Kígyós/Plazović, Körös, Körös-ér, Kraszna, Lajta/Leitha, Maros, Mura/Mur, Pinka, Rába/Raab, Sajó, Sebes-Körös, Séd, Sió, Sugovica, Szamos, Szinva, Tisza, Válicka, Zagyva, Zala, Zsejkei Channel

== See also ==
- Geography of Hungary
- List of lakes of Hungary
