= Hydrology of Hungary =

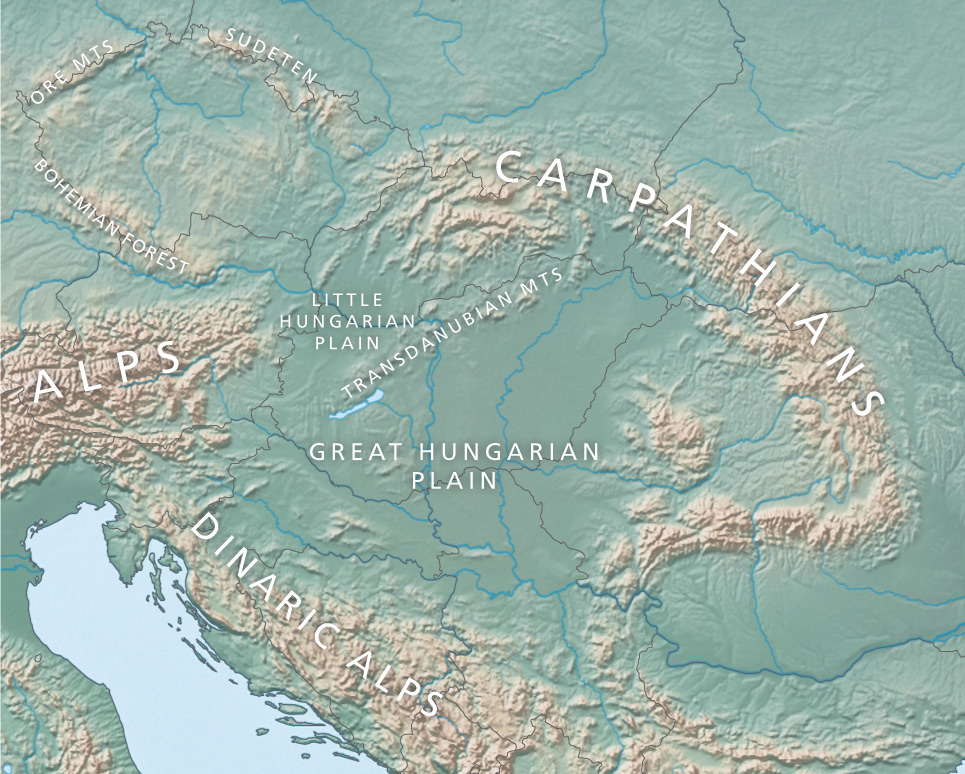
Topographic map with the main streams of the Carpathian Basin

Hungary within the Carpathian basin

The hydrology of Hungary, is mostly determined by Hungary's lying in the middle of the Carpathian Basin, half surrounded by the Carpathian Mountains. All parts of the country have some outflow. All surface water gravitates towards its southern center, and from there, is united in the Danube, which flows into the Black Sea. The whole of Hungary lies within the Danube drainage basin.

The total length of all the irrigation systems and inland waterways in the country is about 26,000 km (16,000 mi).

The annual water balance of the country shows a surplus. Yearly about 100 km^{3} (3.5×10^{12} cu ft) of water leaves the country towards the Black Sea. From that, precipitation amounts for only 10%, the rest being provided by the incoming rivers of surrounding countries.

== Rivers ==
Hydrographically Hungary can be divided into two roughly equal parts: the drainage basins of the Danube and the Tisza.

The present network of Hungary's rivers began to take shape at the end of the Tertiary and the beginning of the Quaternary periods when the Pannonian Sea retreated from the basin.

The rivers in Hungary reach their lowest level at the end of the summer, the beginning of the autumn, or sometimes in the winter.

Both the Danube and the Tisza have two regular floods each year, the early spring "icy flood" and the early summer "green flood". The "icy flood" is the result of the thaw in the mountains surrounding the Carpathian Basin, when the rivers in the plain are usually still frozen. Before the river flows were controlled, the piled-up ice sheets of the river could form tremendous barriers, which in turn could cause devastating floods. This phenomenon can still be a real danger after cold winters, and a small fleet of icebreakers is used on the two rivers to fight against ice barrages. The "green" flood in the early summer carries a much larger amount of water, not only the torrents from the Alps, but also the surface runoff water from the May and June rains.

=== Danube ===
The Danube runs through several countries, and in Hungary is known as the Hungarian: Duna.

==== History ====
The primeval Danube first silted up the basin of the Pannonian Sea which now forms the Eastern Slovak Lowland on the left bank of the river and the Little Hungarian Plain on the right bank. It flowed towards the south into Transdanubia and then followed the present-day course of the Drava into an interior lake system in the south of the present Great Plain. Later the Danube was diverted to the east by tectonic uplift, finding an outlet through the Visegrád gap. During the Quaternary the Great Plain continued to sink, meanwhile the Börzsöny and the Visegrád mountains were rising. The result was the gorge, or a 200-to-300-metre (660 to 980 ft) deep terraced valley cut through the mountains by the Danube at what is now the Danube Bend at Visegrád, between Esztergom and Vác. Once through the gorge, the Danube fanned out into the Great Hungarian Plain, depositing alluvial cones. The present north-south course was formed by the river in the late Pleistocene.

==== Geography ====
The Danube is the second longest river in Europe, after the Volga. Its upper flow is outside of Hungary, but its middle section starts at Devín, close to the Hungarian border. This section of the river stretches until the Iron Gate, between Serbia and Romania. The lower section of the river crosses the Romanian Plain and flows into the Black Sea through a delta. The Hungarian section of the river is 417 km (259 mi) long, from which 140 km (87 mi) forms the border between Hungary and Slovakia, from Čunovo to the mouth of the Ipeľ (Ipoly).

==== Navigation ====
The Danube is navigable for the whole of its course through Hungary with a minimum 2-metre (6.6 ft) depth.

==== Flow and flooding ====
The Danube has been mostly controlled since the 19th century. There is about 1,250 km^{2} (480 sq mi) of flood-protected area along the banks of the Danube in Hungary, with about 1,123,000 km^{3} (269,000 cu mi) of dykes. No stretch of land along the river is left open to the floods.

The Danube has a rate of flow of 10,000 m^{3}/s (350,000 cu ft/s) at its fastest, and 600 m^{3}/s (21,000 cu ft/s) at its slowest, in the region of Budapest. The difference between water levels can be as high as 6 to 8 m (20 to 26 ft). The present flood prevention possibilities are enough to cope with rises up to about 10 metres (33 ft) above the low-water mark, but there are from time to time very dangerous floods.

==== Tributaries ====
The right-hand tributaries of the Danube inside Hungary do not add greatly to its volume. The largest are the Lajta, the Rába, the Rábca and the Marcal. The Sárvíz is joined by the Sió which drains Lake Balaton. The Sió is also fed by the river Kapos.

The only right-hand tributary of any considerable volume is the Drava, which forms also on a large stretch the Hungarian-Croatian border, but joins the Danube already inside Croatia.

=== Tisza ===
==== History ====
The present course of the Tisza was established relatively recently in geological time. Until the end of the Pleistocene it flowed along the southern border of the Nyírség area in north-eastern Hungary, but later it changed its flow forming a right-angled bend to the north of the Nyírség. The Tisza and its tributaries built up very large, but flat alluvial cones along the edges of the Great Plain.

==== Geography ====
The drainage basin of the Tisza is in the eastern part of the Carpathian Basin. 45,000 km^{2} (17,000 sq mi) of this is in Hungary, mostly lowland. Before its control in the 19th century its full length was 1,419 km (882 mi), of which 955 km (593 mi) were within the present boundaries of Hungary. Its control shortened these lengths to 977 km (607 mi) and 579 km (360 mi) respectively. In spite of regulation, the Tisza still has a characteristically wide meanders through the flood plain with sand dunes, wide forests and oxbow lakes, some cut off artificially, some naturally. In Hungary the Tisza is a sluggish river with a very gentle gradient. Before it was brought under control it regularly flooded an area of 2,000 km^{2} (770 sq mi). The volume of water in the Tisza fluctuates even more than that in the Danube because the catchment area is mostly medium-height mountains, and not by high mountains with permanent snow.

==== Flow and flooding ====
The Tisza has three floods yearly, the early spring flood from the snow thaw, then the early summer "green flood", brought on by the summer rain, and then a minor flood in the autumn. Its lowest level is in winter.

The rate of flow varies at Szolnok between 72 m^{3}/s (2,500 cu ft/s) and 3,800 m^{3}/s (130,000 cu ft/s) Before the extensive controls, when the spring floods of the Danube and the Tisza happened to coincide, the Danube could not absorb the water of the Tisza and the resulting flood could cause immense damage throughout the Great Plain. The length of the Tisza dykes now exceeds 4,000 km (2,500 mi).

==== Navigation ====
The Tisza is navigable for smaller vessels right up to Dombrád near the north-eastern frontier of the country. In the Trans-Tisza Region (east of the river) extensive areas are irrigated by its water.

==== Tributaries ====
The last and largest tributary of the Tisza within Hungary is the Maros.

Among the tributaries of the Tisza the most important on the right side is the Bodrog, which flows into the Tisza at Tokaj. Their confluence has often changed, as is graphically illustrated by the extensive oxbow lakes and belts of shallows in the vicinity of Tokaj.

The next right-hand tributary of the Tisza is the Hornád, which receives earlier also the waters of the Bódva and the Sajó. Below Tiszafüred the river takes up the Eger river and at Szolnok the Zagyva which already collected the waters of Galga and Tápió. To the south from this point no more streams run into the Tisza from the ridge which separates it from the Danube. The eastern slope of this ridge is only broken by dried-out valleys.

The more significant left-hand tributes of the Tisza include the Szamos with the Kraszna, the Körös, which is usually called Treble Körös, because it gathers up the water of several minor rivers, (White Körös, Black Körös, Rapid Körös, Berettyó and the Hortobágy river). Before the great river controls of the 19th century this region was an almost endless stretch of marshlands and fens. Today there is a system of irrigation canals in the area.

== Canals ==
The river is spelt Tisa in other languages. In Hungarian the spelling is Tisza, but it is not assonated.

In the late 19th century, during the large-scale controls, canal systems were also created partly as artificial waterways, partly to help the agricultural use of land, and partly to conduct away superfluous inland water. The most important canal of Transdanubia is the 100 km (62.1 mi) Sió connecting Lake Balaton and the Danube. The Hanság Canal goes across a boggy land between the Lake Fertő and the Danube. The 97 km (60 mi) long Main Eastern Canal, which was only finished after 1945, crosses the drier parts of the Great Hungarian Plain to the east of the Tisza.

== Lakes ==
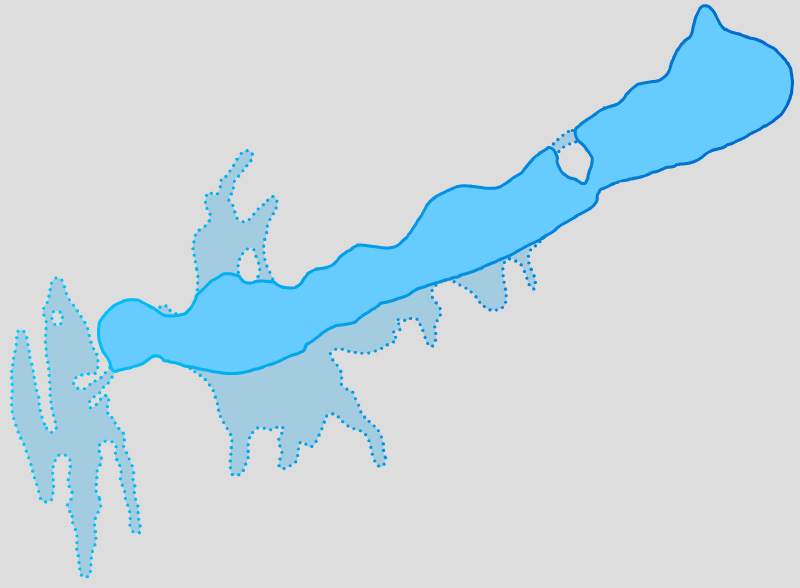
Lake Balaton in ancient times

Hungary is not very rich in lakes, and their basins are no older than the late Pleistocene. There is no really deep lake in the country. The shallower waters warm up quickly in summer, and water temperatures of 25 °C (77 °F) are quite common, which makes them very pleasant for bathing.

Lake Balaton is the biggest in Central Europe. It covers 600 km^{2} (230 sq mi), being 77 km (48 mi) long and up to 15 km (9.3 mi) wide. It lies 104 m (341 ft) above mean sea level and has an average depth of 3 m (9.8 ft), with its deepest point being at Tihany, at 10.8 m (35 ft).

Evaporation from the lake is greater than the inflow from small rivers and streams. The deficit is compensated by rainwater and underground sources. The occasional surplus water leaves the lake through the canalised Sió.

During the Pleistocene the lake was much larger, and 20 to 30 m (66 to 98 ft) deep.

The southern shore of Lake Balaton is extremely shallow, the average depth only being reached at a distance of 500 to 1,000 m (1,600 to 3,300 ft) from the shore. There is a 70 km (43 mi) long beach ridge, covered by sand, on the southern shore, built up by the waves underneath the dominant north-westerly wind.

The northern shore is more varied, with the Tihany Peninsula, and it has steeper beach shelves.

Summer begins in May at the lake and ends in late September with maximum air temperatures of 30°C (86°F) - 35°C (95°F), minimum water temperatures of 17°C (63°F) - 18°C (64°F) despite cold fronts, and maximum water temperatures of 24°C (75°F) - 30°C (86°F), creating a mesoclimate on the shores of the lake.

Sudden storms can whip up dangerous, steep waves on the surface of the lake. Their average height is 1 metre (3.3 ft), and their average length is 7 metres (23 ft). A prevailing north-easterly or south-westerly wind can push the water from the eastern basin of the lake (to the east of the Tihany Peninsula) into the western basin or on the contrary, resulting in water levels differing by 0.4 to 0.6 metres (1.3 to 2.0 ft) from normal, which creates strong currents.

The lake freezes almost every winter, the thickness of the ice can reach 0.4 metres (1.3 ft), which creates good opportunities for sport.

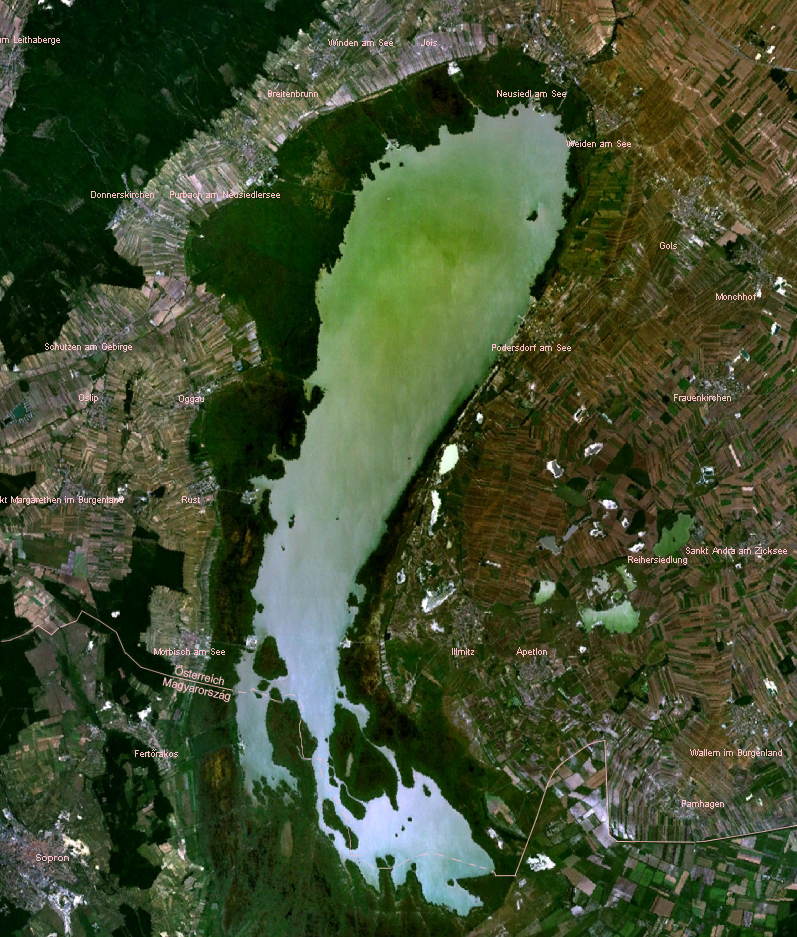
Neusiedler/Fertő Lake - satellite image

The second largest lake of Hungary is Lake Fertő (Neusiedl) on the border with Austria. Its water level and shore line have been changed over time very widely. The lake is very shallow, with an average water level of 1.5 m (4.9 ft). The greater part of its surface is covered with reeds, huge quantities of which are used industrially. A quarter of the lake's area of 335 km^{2} (129 sq mi) lies in Hungary, with the other three-quarters in Austria. The adjacent marshy Hanság was drained by the Hanság Canal.

The third largest lake in Hungary, Lake Velence is a steppe lake in an advanced stage of alluviation. Its surface area is 26 km^{2} (10 sq mi), but only 16 km^{2} (6.2 sq mi) is open water, the rest being covered by reeds. It is a popular holiday resort, being close to Budapest.

== Swamps and marshes ==
The Little Balaton was originally a part of the larger lake, but now it is mostly a swamp and marsh area at the south-western corner of the Balaton with a highly characteristic wildlife. It is a protected natural reserve.

Before the extensive controls of the 19th century there were a lot of marshes and swamps in the country like the Sárrét of Transdanubia or the Ecsed Moorland close to the north-eastern corner of the country. They have been drained, reclaimed and transformed into land fit for farming.

Spring-water lakes are a special class of natural lakes in Hungary. They are fed mostly by warm springs, but karstic ones also occur (Lake Hévíz, the Malom Pool in Budapest, Tapolca). The alkaline Lake Fehér near Szeged has no outlet. It is a famous nature reserve in Körös-Maros National Park.

== Underground water ==
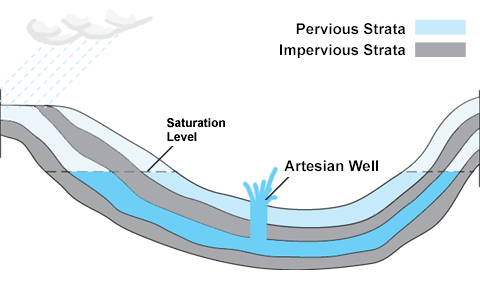
Scheme of geological strata in a basin with an Artesian well.

Underground water is very important in Hungary, especially on the Great Plain. Stratum water is abundant because Hungary is in the middle of the Carpathian Basin. These water resources are between two impermeable strata underlying the first impervious stratum beneath the underground water. They are predominantly of rainfall origin, mostly not from Hungary, but from the surrounding higher-lying parts of the Carpathian Basin. This water, when brought to the surface from great depths, is rich in various mineral solutions and may be very hot.

Deep boring for stratum water has been carried out throughout the country. There are about twenty-eight thousand artesian wells in the Great Plain alone, out of a total of thirty-five thousand for the whole country. Their depth varies from 100 to 2,500 m (330 to 8,200 ft). In the hilly and mountainous regions of Mesozoic limestone, karstic water is also important.

== See also ==
- List of rivers of Hungary

== Sources ==
- Ferenc Erdei, ed. (1968), Information Hungary, Pergamon Press, pp. 14–20
