= List of lakes of Hungary =

This is an incomplete list of lakes of Hungary.

Image	Lake	Area (km^{2})	Depth (m)
	Lake Balaton	592	12.2
	Lake Dombay		
	Lake Fehér	14	
	Lake Feneketlen	0.01	4
	Lake Gőtés		
	Fertő	315	1.8
	Lake Hévíz	0.047	
	Lake Öreg	2.69	
	Lake Palatinus	0.32	12
	Lake Sárkány		
	Lake Szelid	3.6	
	Lake Tisza	127	17
	Lake Velence	26	1.6

== See also ==
- List of rivers of Hungary
