= Fladnitz =

Fladnitz refers to the following places in Austria:

- Fladnitz an der Teichalm, Gemeinde im Bezirk Weiz, Steiermark
- Fladnitz im Raabtal, Gemeinde im Bezirk Südoststeiermark
