= Sülysáp =

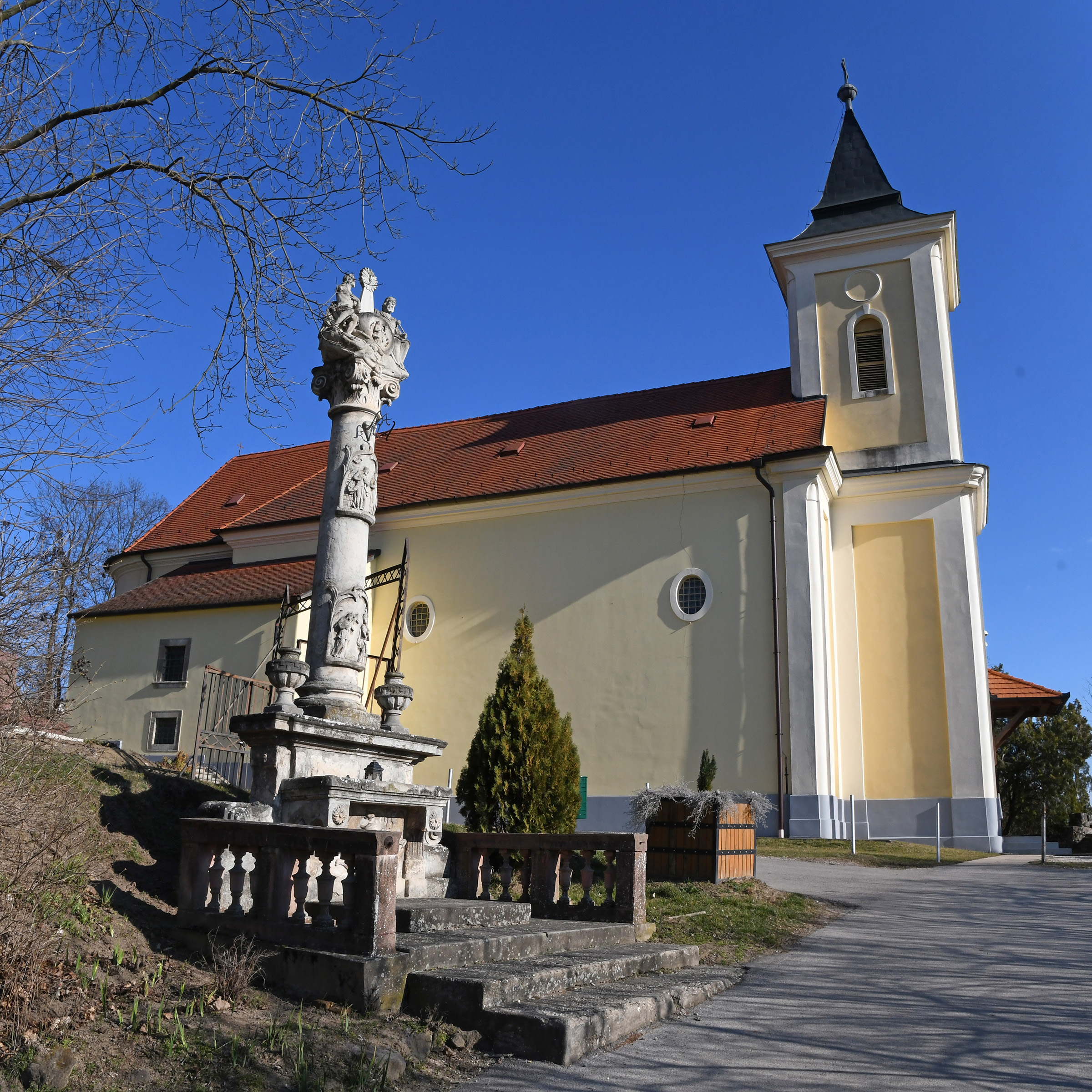
- Church of Saint Stephen of Hungary

- Flag Coat of arms

- Location of Sülysáp in Hungary
- Coordinates: 47.452°N 19.534°E
- Country: Hungary
- Region: Central Hungary
- County: Pest
- District: Nagykáta
- Diocese (RC): Vác

Government
  - Mayor: László Horinka

Area
  - Total: 47.19 km^{2} (18.22 sq mi)

Population (1 January 2009)
  - Total: 8,258
  - Density: 175.0/km^{2} (453.2/sq mi)
- Time zone: UTC+1 (CET)
  - Summer (DST): UTC+2 (CEST)
- Postal code: 2241
- Area code: +36 29
- Website: www.sulysap.hu

Sülysáp is a town in Pest County, Hungary about 40 kilometres (25 mi) east of Budapest. In 1950 two villages, Tápiósáp and Tápiósüly, amalgamated, but they separated in 1954. In 1970 they combined again to form Sülysáp.

== Geography ==
Sülysáp is in the Lower Tápió Valley of the Gödöllő hills. In this picturesque location, surrounded by low hills and terrain, the Lower Tápió and Sápi streams add to making the town a major spot.

== Communications ==
Primary route 31 serves the town by road.

Express and stopping trains of the Hungarian State Railways serve the town on suburban line 120a (Budapest–Újszász–Szolnok) at the main station (Sülysáp) and a smaller station halt (Szőlősnyaralö). "Szőlősnyaralö" is best translated as "Vineyard retreat"; the village was built as holiday homes for workers from Budapest. Over the years these holiday homes have been converted and extended and are used as main homes.

The nearest airport is the main international airport for the capital, Budapest-Ferihegy.

== Economy ==
There are around 360 small and medium enterprises in the town, providing the livelihood of a large segment of the population.

After the collapse of the collective farming system, the lands around Sülysáp were privatized, and farmers became self-employed. The Agricultural Service Co-op was founded not long after, and currently leases almost half of the land from the owners, with a large number of members.

Other companies employing significant numbers of people include Ebm. Hungary Ltd., Jász-Plasztik Ltd., Darázs Ltd., and Fővárosi Gázmúvek (Budapest Gas Works Co) Public Company. Local government services also employ many people.

== Landmarks ==
- The Roman Catholic Church of Our Lady, built in 1489 in Gothic style.
- The Sőtér Castle, built by the Sőtér family of landed gentry in 1725.
- The Grassalkovich shooting lodge, visited by Sándor Petőfi during the Hungarian Revolution of 1848.
- The life-size statue of Saint Stephen on Saint Stephen Square.
- The statue of the Holy Trinity.
- The statue of Saint John of Nepomuk.
- The House of Prayer of the Pentecostal Church.
- The Italian memorial by the Fiume Studies Society, in remembrance of the 129 Italian citizens who died at Tápiósüly (now part of Sülysap) in the internment camp.
- The statue of a girl holding a peacock.

== Gallery ==
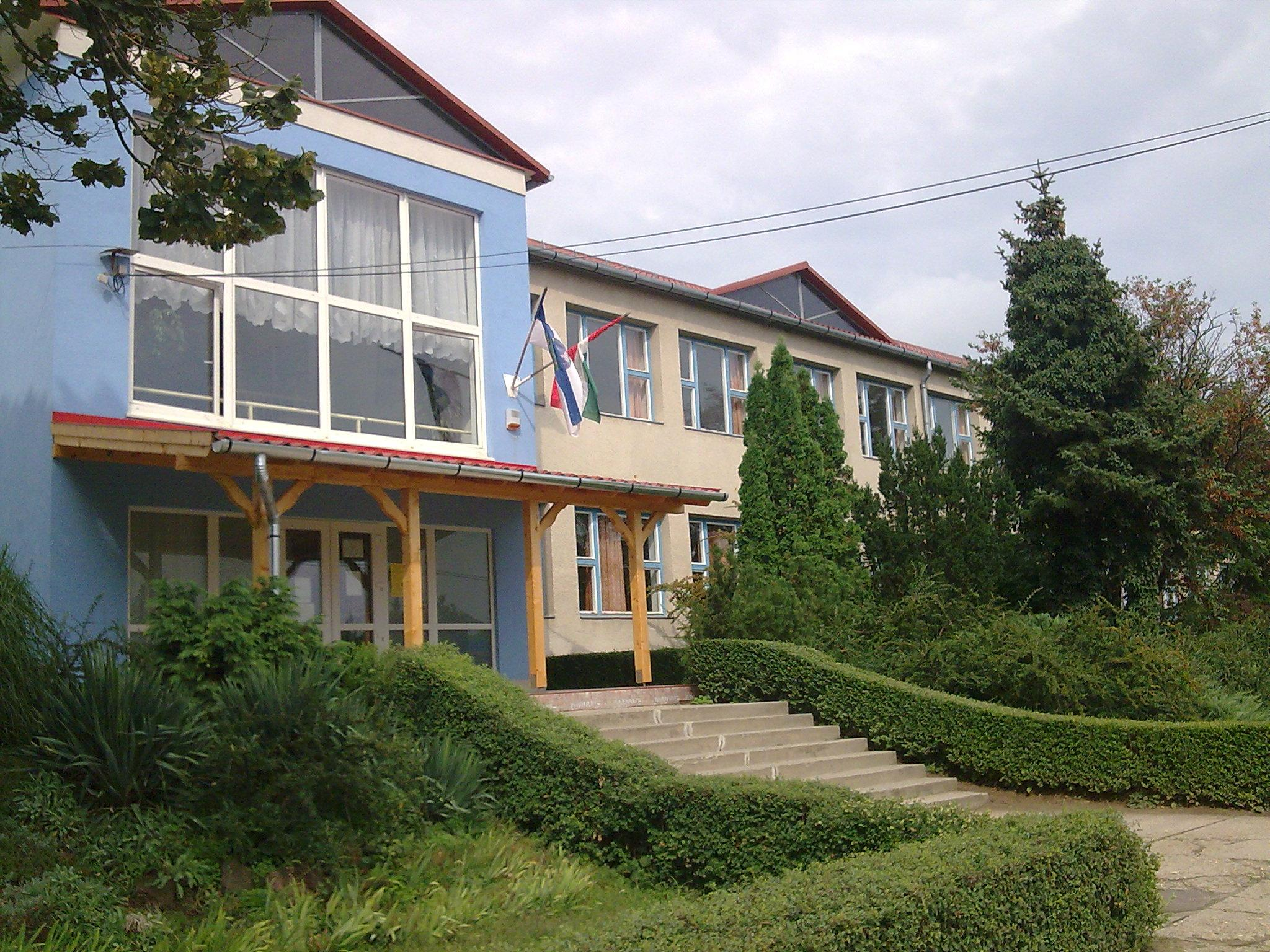
Ferenc Móra Primary School

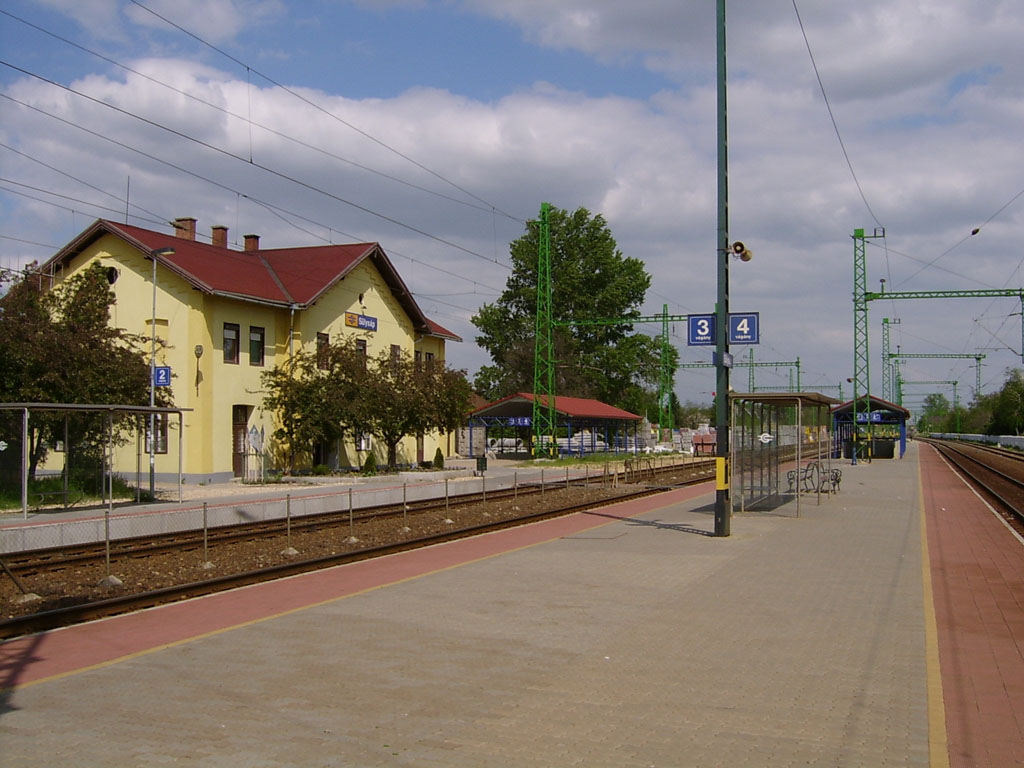
Sülysáp railway station in May 2007

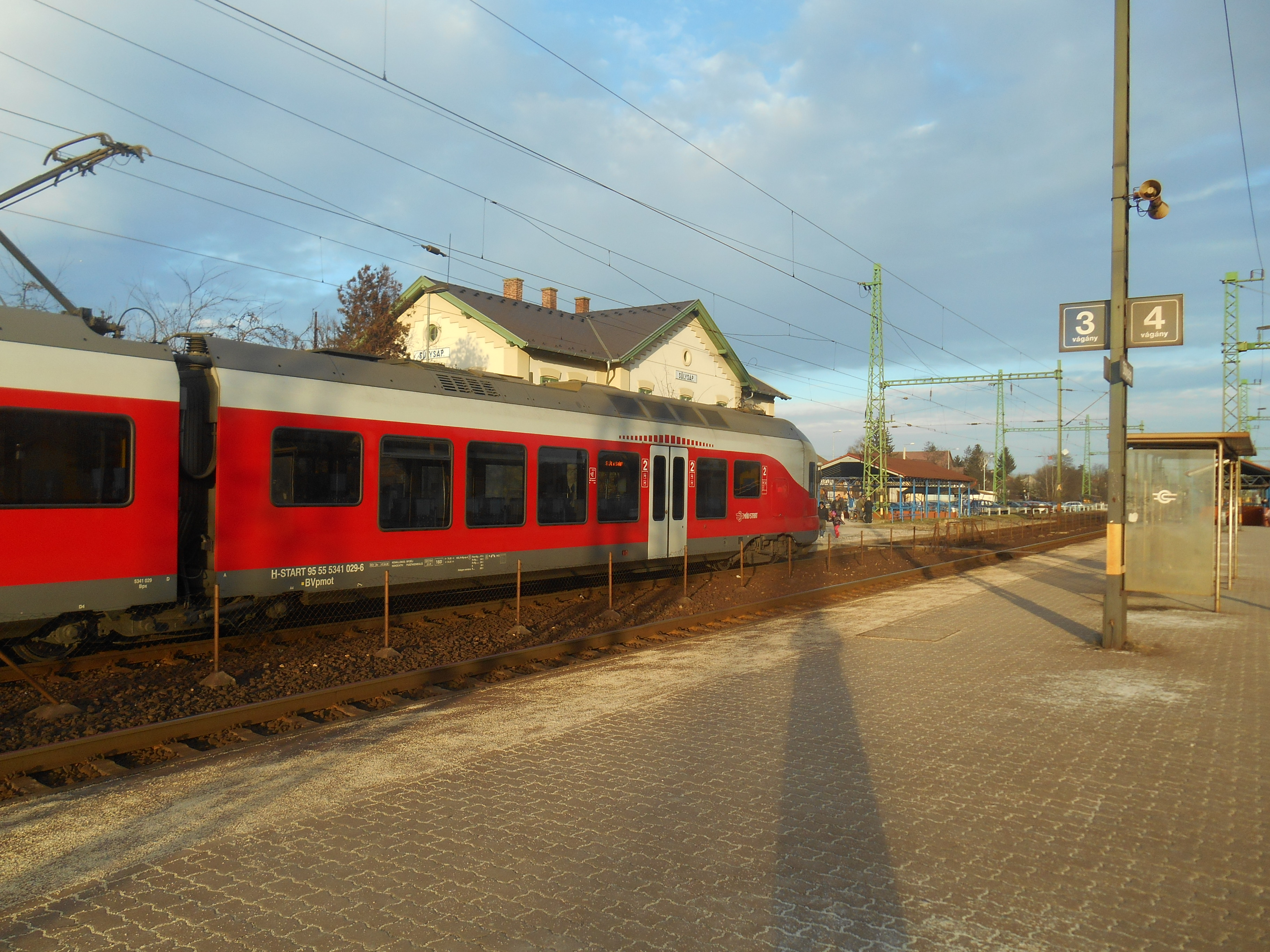
The station in February 2014. A Budapest-bound train is ready to depart

== Twin towns - twin cities ==
- Innsbruck – Austria
- Plymouth – United Kingdom
- Sânmartin – Romania
