= Zsejkei Channel =

Location
- Country: Hungary

Physical characteristics
- Source
  - location: Dunaremete, Plain of Moson, Little Hungarian Plain, Hungary
- Mouth
  - location: Mosoni-Duna, at Hédervár
  - coordinates: 47°49′15″N 17°27′21″E

Zsejkei Channel originates on the Mosoni Plain, Little Hungarian Plain, in the county of Györ-Moson-Soprn, Hungary. It runs mainly southeastward to Hédervár, where it flows into the Mosoni-Duna.

== Settlements at the banks ==
- Dunaremete
- Lipót
- Ásványráró
- Hédervár
