= Cserta =

Stream in Zala, Hungary

Coordinates: 46°36′N 16°38′E

Cserta is a 16.6 km long stream in the hills of Zala, Hungary.

Cserta's spring is at the Kandikó Hill. It becomes a larger stream after the Kerta stream flows into it at Mikekarácsonyfa. Its other main stream is the Lower Válicka, which ends at Páka. Cserta's watershed area is 441 km^{2}. Cserta flows to the Kerka at the end.
