= Válicka =

There are to streams in Zala County, Hungary under this name. These are:

- Lower Válicka Hungarian: Alsó-Válicka
- Upper Válicka Hungarian: Felső-Válicka
