= Little Hungarian Plain =

Part of the Pannonian Plain, Central Europe

Coordinates: 47°45′N 17°20′E

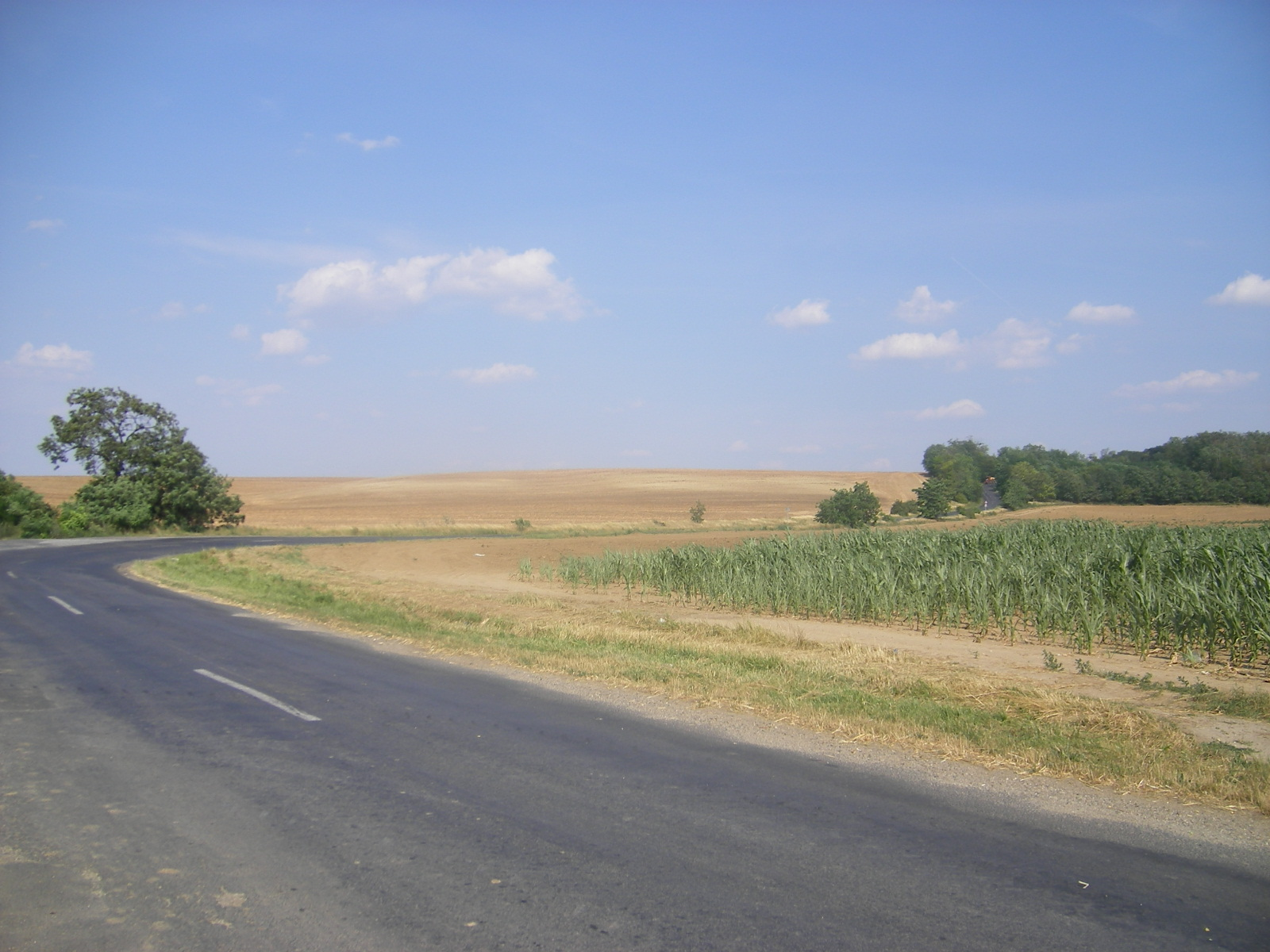
- Landscape in Győr-Moson-Sopron
- Interactive map of Little Hungarian Plain
- Location: Eastern Austria, Western Hungary, South-western Slovakia

Area
  - Total: 8,000 km^{2} (3,100 sq mi)

The Little Hungarian Plain or Little Alföld (Hungarian: Kisalföld [ˈkiʃɒlføld], Slovak: Malá dunajská kotlina, German: Kleine Ungarische Tiefebene) is a plain (tectonic basin) of approximately 8,000 km² in northwestern Hungary, south-western Slovakia (Podunajská nížina – Danubian Lowland), and eastern Austria. It is a part of the Pannonian plain which covers most parts of Hungary.

== Geography ==
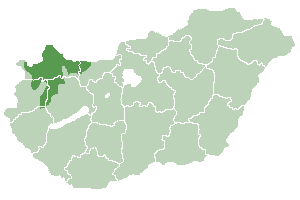
The territory of the LHP in Hungary

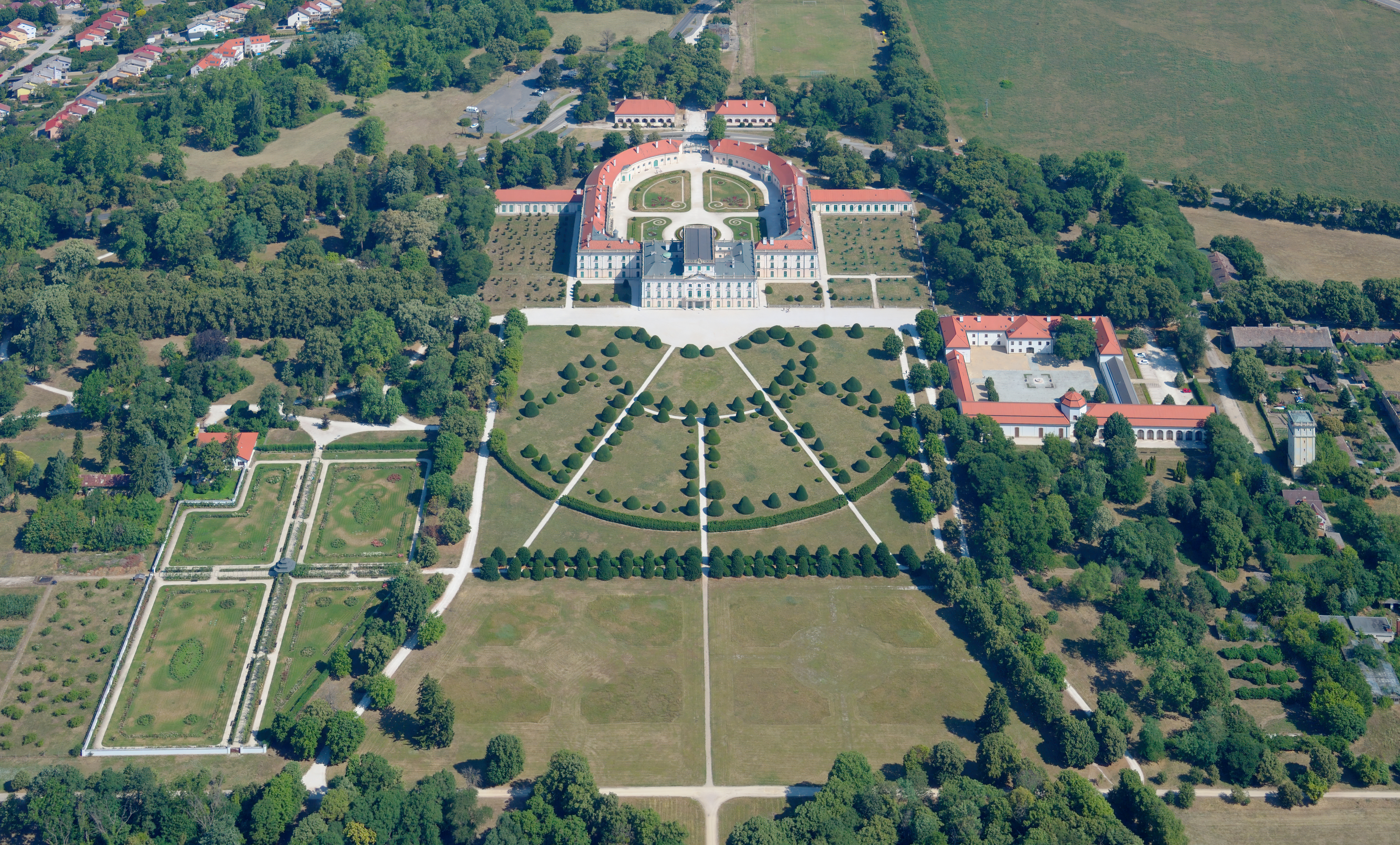
The castle of the Eszterházy family. Such buildings are typical in the area.

Its borders are the Carpathians on the north, the Bakony-Vértes Hills in the south, the Gerecse Hills in the east, and the Leitha Mountains and the foothills of the Alps in the west. In Hungary, it includes most of Győr-Moson-Sopron and Vas counties, and the western part of Komárom-Esztergom and Veszprém.

The plain is roughly cut in half by the Danube which is split up into many arms between Bratislava and Komárno, forming large islands. Its main tributaries are the Váh, the Rába, the Rábca and the Marcal rivers.

Smaller microregions of the Little Alföld are Hanság, Seewinkel, Neusiedl Basin, Rábaköz, Szigetköz, Marcal Basin, Moson Plain, Komárom-Esztergom Plain and Žitný ostrov.

The neighbouring regions of Kemeneshát, Sopron-Vas Plain and Steirisches Hügelland are sometimes classified as belonging to the Little Alföld, but Hungarian and Austrian geographers use the term in a more narrow meaning.

== History ==
The plain has been an important area of agriculture since the Neolithic Age. The southern part of it belonged to the Roman province of Pannonia between the 1st and 5th centuries and later was inhabited by Germanic and Slavic peoples and since about 900 also by Hungarians. Since about 1000, the region became part of the Kingdom of Hungary. After World War I the Little Alföld was divided between Hungary, Czechoslovakia and Austria. In the 1990s Slovakia built a large dam and power plant at Gabčíkovo.

== Population ==
Country borders don't closely follow linguistic boundaries, especially in the case of the northern part of the plain where Hungarians are a majority in the two southernmost districts Dunajská Streda and Komárno and a minority in the remaining districts. There are also smaller groups of Croats in the tri-state border region. Important cities in the region are Győr (HU), Komárom (HU), Komárno (SK), Dunajská Streda (SK), Nové Zámky (SK), and Mosonmagyaróvár (HU).

== See also ==
- Danubian Lowland
- Great Alföld
- Sedimentary basin
- Lowland
