= Séd =

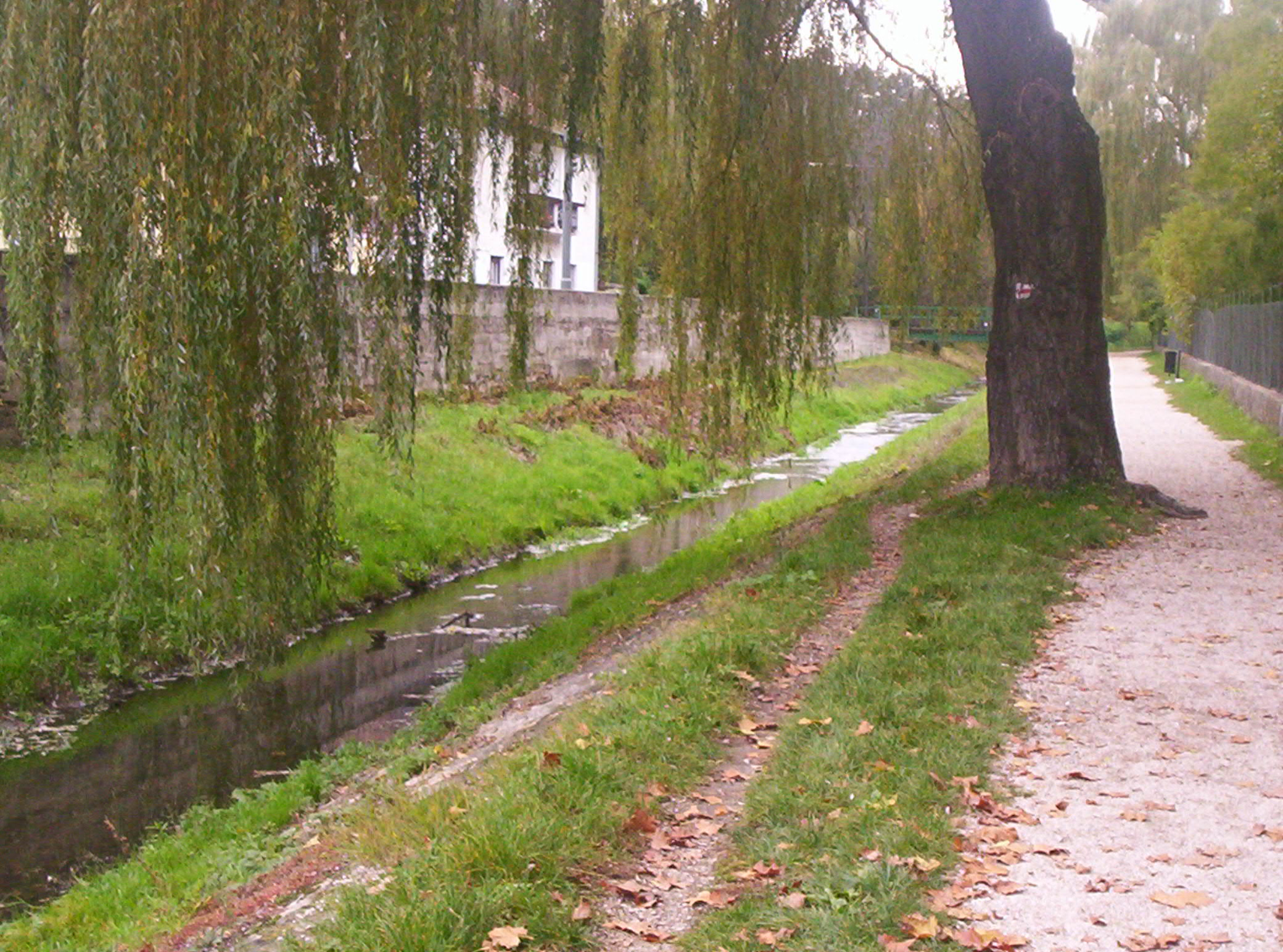
- The Séd in Veszprém

Location
- Country: Hungary

Physical characteristics
- Mouth
  - location: Sárvíz
  - coordinates: 47°09′06″N 18°20′58″E
- Length: 70 km (43 mi)

Basin features
- Progression: Sárvíz→ Sió→ Danube→ Black Sea

Séd is a river in western Hungary, north of Lake Balaton. It is 70 kilometres (43 mi) long and flows through the city of Veszprém. It starts in the Bakony region and is a tributary to the Sárvíz near Cece.

The river once had many watermills along its length. The first recorded water wheel on the Séd was donated by Gisela of Hungary to Bakonybél Abbey in 1037.
