= Lake Sárkány =

Lake in Hungary

- Location within Hungary
- Location: Székesfehérvár Sub-region
- Coordinates: 46°59′16″N 18°32′46″E
- Basin countries: Hungary

Lake Sárkány (Sárkány-tó, "Dragon Lake") is a lake in Hungary's Székesfehérvár sub-region.

== Avian Population ==
The lakes area is home to birds such as the Avocet (Recurvirostra avosetta), Water Rail (Rallus aquaticus), Black-tailed Goldwit (Limosa limosa) and Sandpiper species.
