= Lake Dombay =

Artificial lake in Hungary

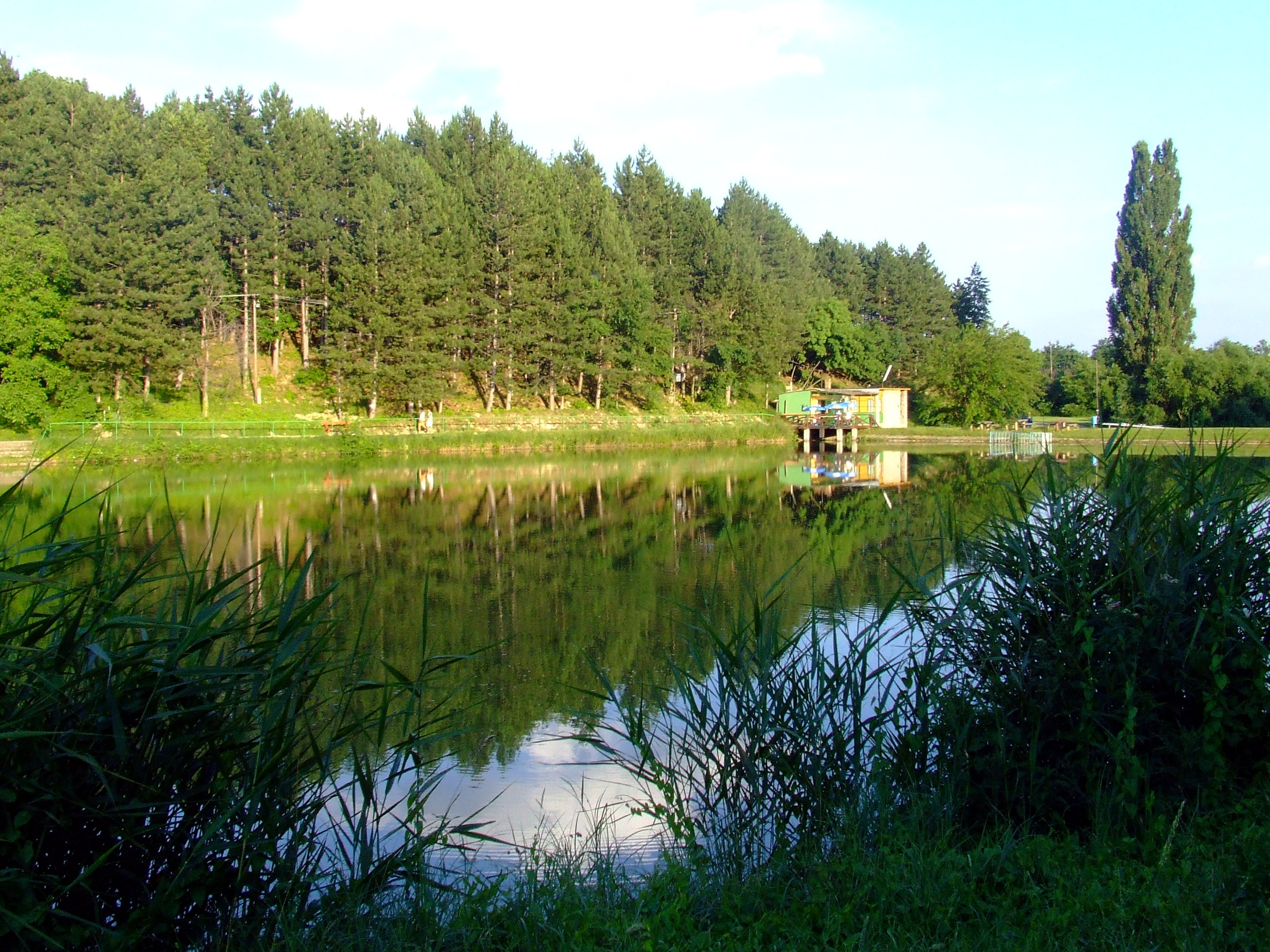

- Location within Hungary
- Coordinates: 46°08′49″N 18°23′51″E
- Basin countries: Hungary

Lake Dombay is a man-made lake of Hungary.
