= Lake Palatinus =

Lake in Esztergom, Hungary

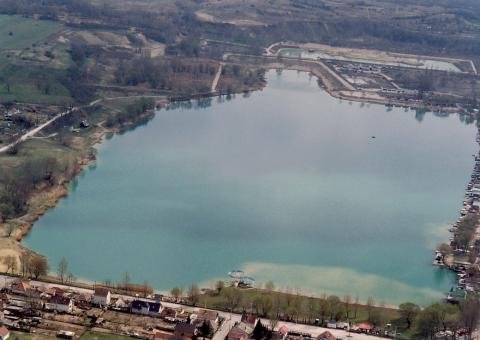

- Location within Hungary
- Location: Esztergom
- Coordinates: 47°43′41″N 18°44′26″E
- Basin countries: Hungary
- Surface area: 32 ha (79 acres)
- Max. depth: 12 m (39 ft)

At 32-hectares, Lake Palatinus sits in Esztergom, Hungary, 40 km from Budapest, on the border of the Danube-Ipoly National Park. It is the biggest man-made lake of the Dorog Basin. Created at the site of a former quarry active in the 1950s whose aggregate sand was extracted for use in the mining industry. At its deepest point, the lake stands at 12 meters.
