= Dunaremete =

- Coat of arms

- Location of Győr-Moson-Sopron county in Hungary

- Location of Dunaremete
- Coordinates: 47.87657°N 17.43672°E
- Country: Hungary
- County: Győr-Moson-Sopron

Area
  - Total: 4.36 km^{2} (1.68 sq mi)

Population (2004)
  - Total: 246
  - Density: 56.42/km^{2} (146.1/sq mi)
- Time zone: UTC+1 (CET)
  - Summer (DST): UTC+2 (CEST)
- Postal code: 9235
- Area code: 96

Dunaremete is a village in Győr-Moson-Sopron county, Hungary.
