= Hollenthon, Austria =

Hollenthon
- Municipality
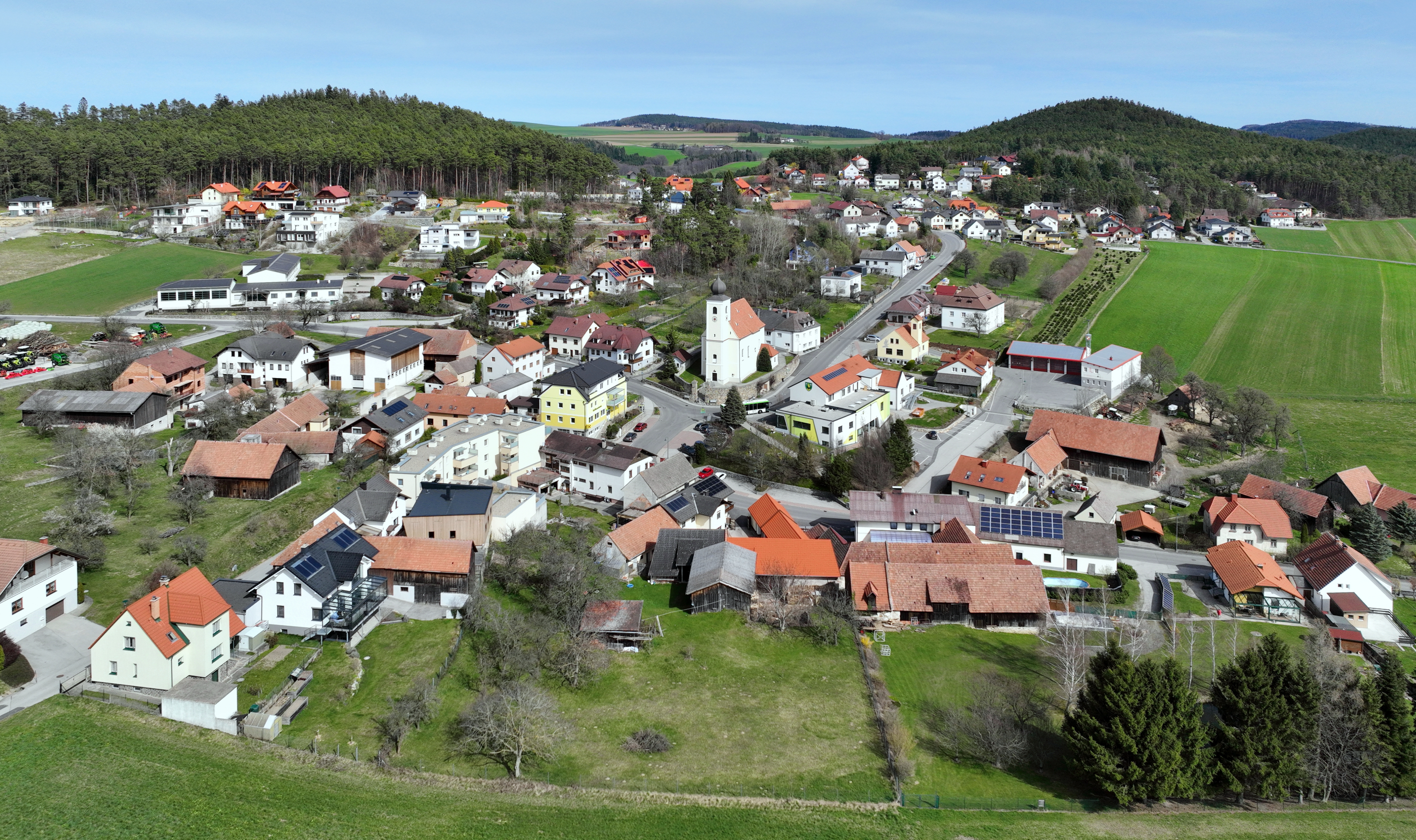
- West-southwest view of Hollenthon

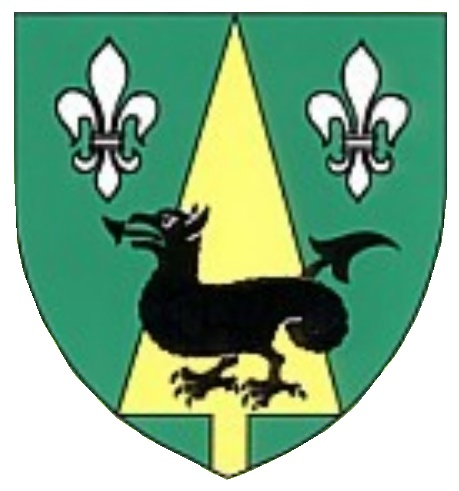
- Coat of arms

- Location within Austria
- Coordinates: 47°35′24″N 16°15′33″E
- Country: Austria
- State: Lower Austria
- District: Wiener Neustadt-Land

Government
  - Mayor: Manfred Grundtner (ÖVP)

Area
  - Total: 23.8 km^{2} (9.2 sq mi)
- Elevation: 661 m (2,169 ft)

Population (2018-01-01)
  - Total: 1,018
  - Density: 42.8/km^{2} (111/sq mi)
- Time zone: UTC+1 (CET)
  - Summer (DST): UTC+2 (CEST)
- Postal code: 2812
- Area code: 02645
- Vehicle registration: WB
- Website: www.hollenthon.at

Hollenthon is a municipality in the district of Wiener Neustadt-Land in the Austrian state of Lower Austria.

== Population ==
Historical population
Year	Pop.	±%
1971	1,047	—
1981	1,033	−1.3%
1991	1,000	−3.2%
2001	1,048	+4.8%
