= Fladnitz im Raabtal =

- Former municipality
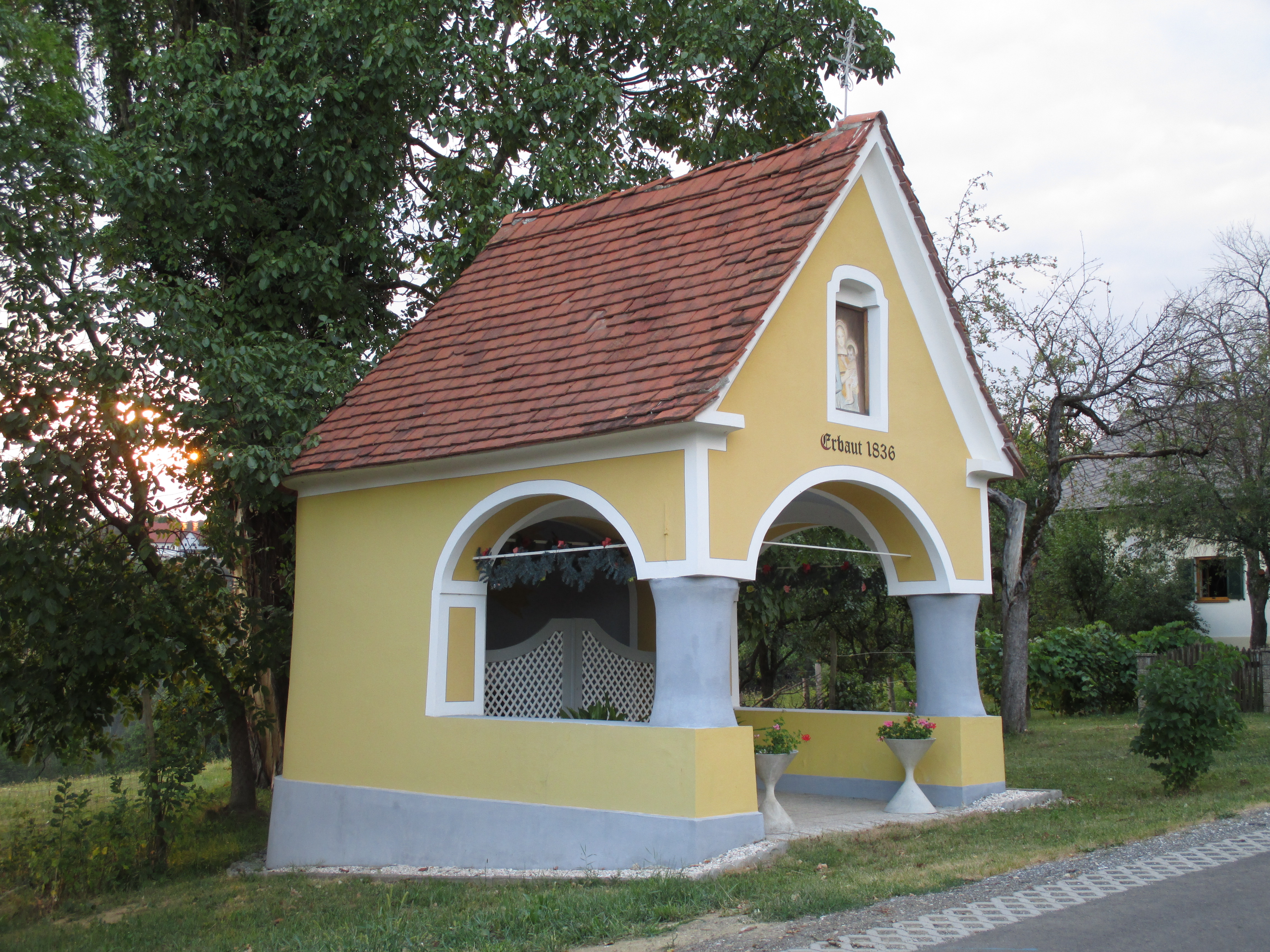
- Chapel in Mitterfladnitz

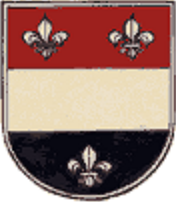
- Coat of arms

- Location within Austria
- Coordinates: 46°59′00″N 15°47′00″E
- Country: Austria
- State: Styria
- District: Südoststeiermark

Area
  - Total: 6.32 km^{2} (2.44 sq mi)
- Elevation: 310 m (1,020 ft)

Population (1 January 2016)
  - Total: 753
  - Density: 119/km^{2} (309/sq mi)
- Time zone: UTC+1 (CET)
  - Summer (DST): UTC+2 (CEST)
- Postal code: 8322, 8332
- Area code: +43 3115
- Vehicle registration: FB
- Website: www.fladnitz-raabtal. steiermark.at

Fladnitz im Raabtal is a former municipality in the district of Südoststeiermark in the Austrian state of Styria. Since the 2015 Styria municipal structural reform, it is part of the municipality Kirchberg an der Raab.

== Population ==
Historical population
Year	Pop.	±%
1869	481	—
1880	529	+10.0%
1890	581	+9.8%
1900	541	−6.9%
1910	597	+10.4%
1923	595	−0.3%
1934	654	+9.9%
1939	618	−5.5%
1951	652	+5.5%
1961	743	+14.0%
1971	710	−4.4%
1981	713	+0.4%
1991	698	−2.1%
2001	739	+5.9%
2013	749	+1.4%
