= Lake Gőtés =

Lake in Hungary

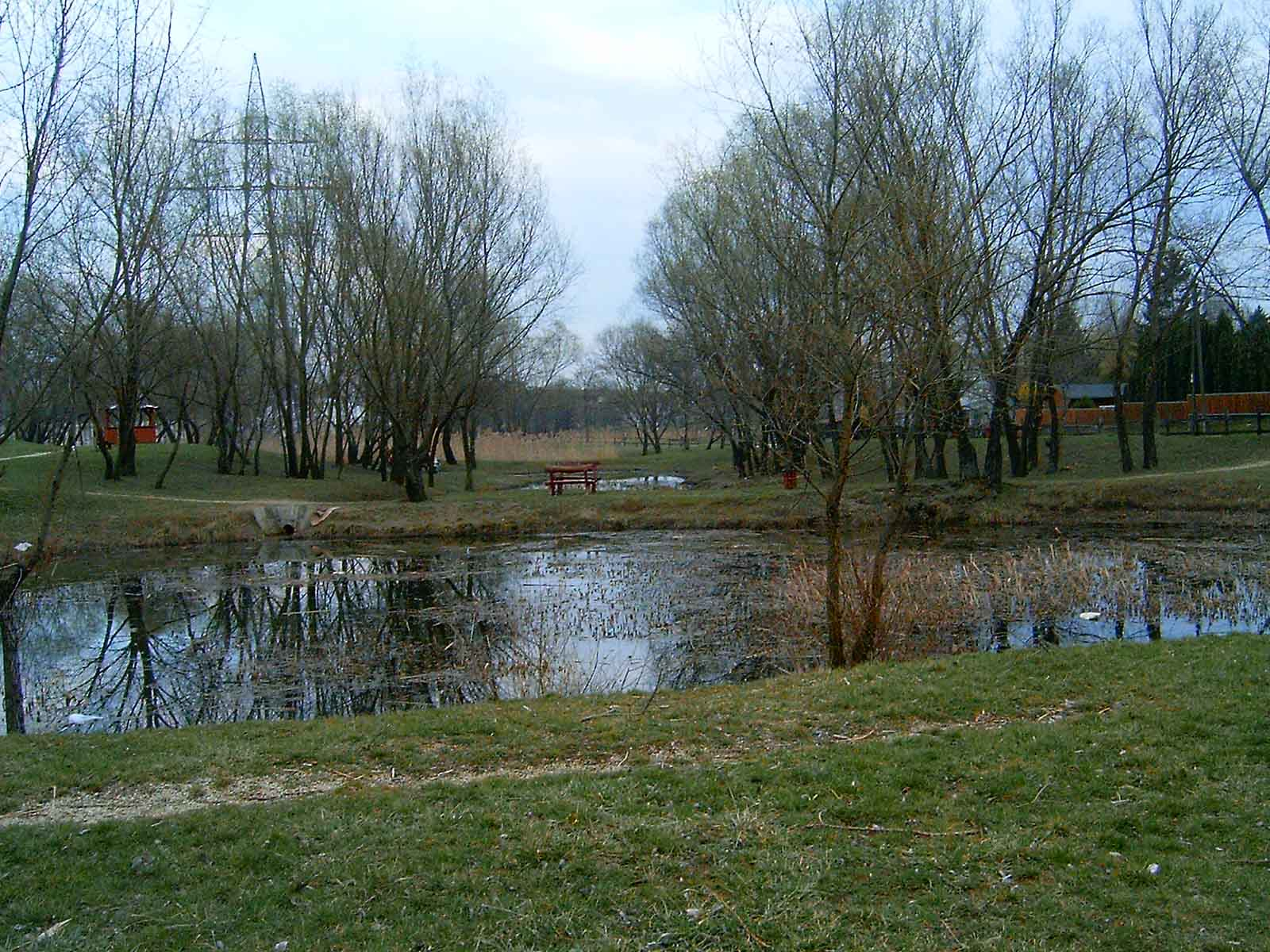

- Location within Hungary
- Coordinates: 47°35′44″N 19°2′28″E
- Basin countries: Hungary

Lake Gőtés is a lake of Hungary.
