= Darázs =

Darázs or Darazs is a surname. Notable people with the surname include:

- Arpad Darazs (1922–1986), Hungarian-American music educator
- Péter Darázs (born 1985), Hungarian short track speed skater
- Rózsa Darázs (born 1987), Hungarian short track speed skater
