= Rabnitz =

Rabnitz Répce, Rábca
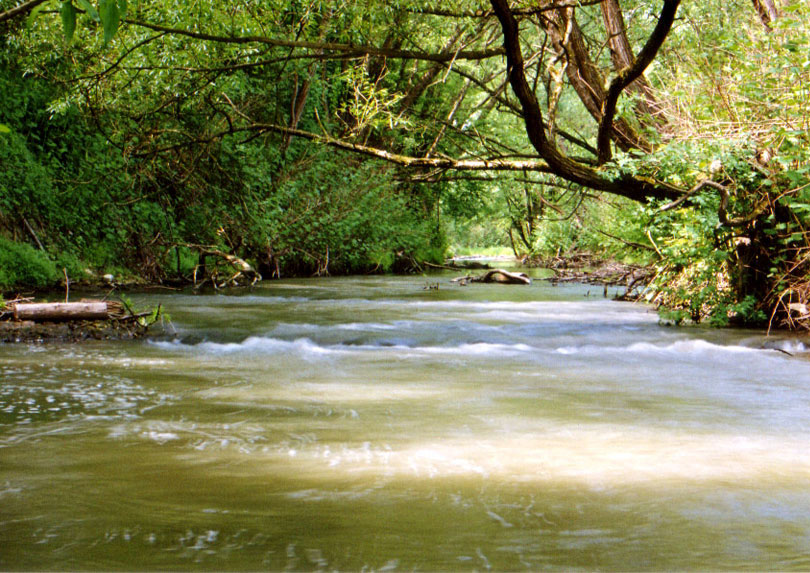
- The Rabnitz near Lutzmannsburg

- Location in Hungary

Location
- Countries: Austria and Hungary

Physical characteristics
- Source: confluence of Spratzbach and Thalbach
  - location: near Hollenthon, Lower Austria
  - coordinates: 47°32′39″N 16°18′34″E
- Mouth: Danube (Moson branch)
  - location: near Győr
  - coordinates: 47°42′34″N 17°34′20″E
- Basin size: 4,506 km^{2} (1,740 sq mi)

Basin features
- Progression: Danube→ Black Sea

The Rabnitz (Hungarian: Répce, Rábca) is a river in eastern Austria and northwestern Hungary. Its basin area is 4,506 km^{2} (1,740 sq mi).

The Rabnitz is formed at the confluence of its two headstreams Spratzbach and Thalbach near Hollenthon in Lower Austria. It flows towards the east through Burgenland, and enters Hungary (Győr-Moson-Sopron County) near Répcevis. It receives the Hanság-főcsatorna, the canal that drains the Neusiedler See, from the left, after that changes Hungarian name to Rábca from Répce. It discharges into the Moson branch of the Danube near Győr.
