= Sárvíz (Sió) =

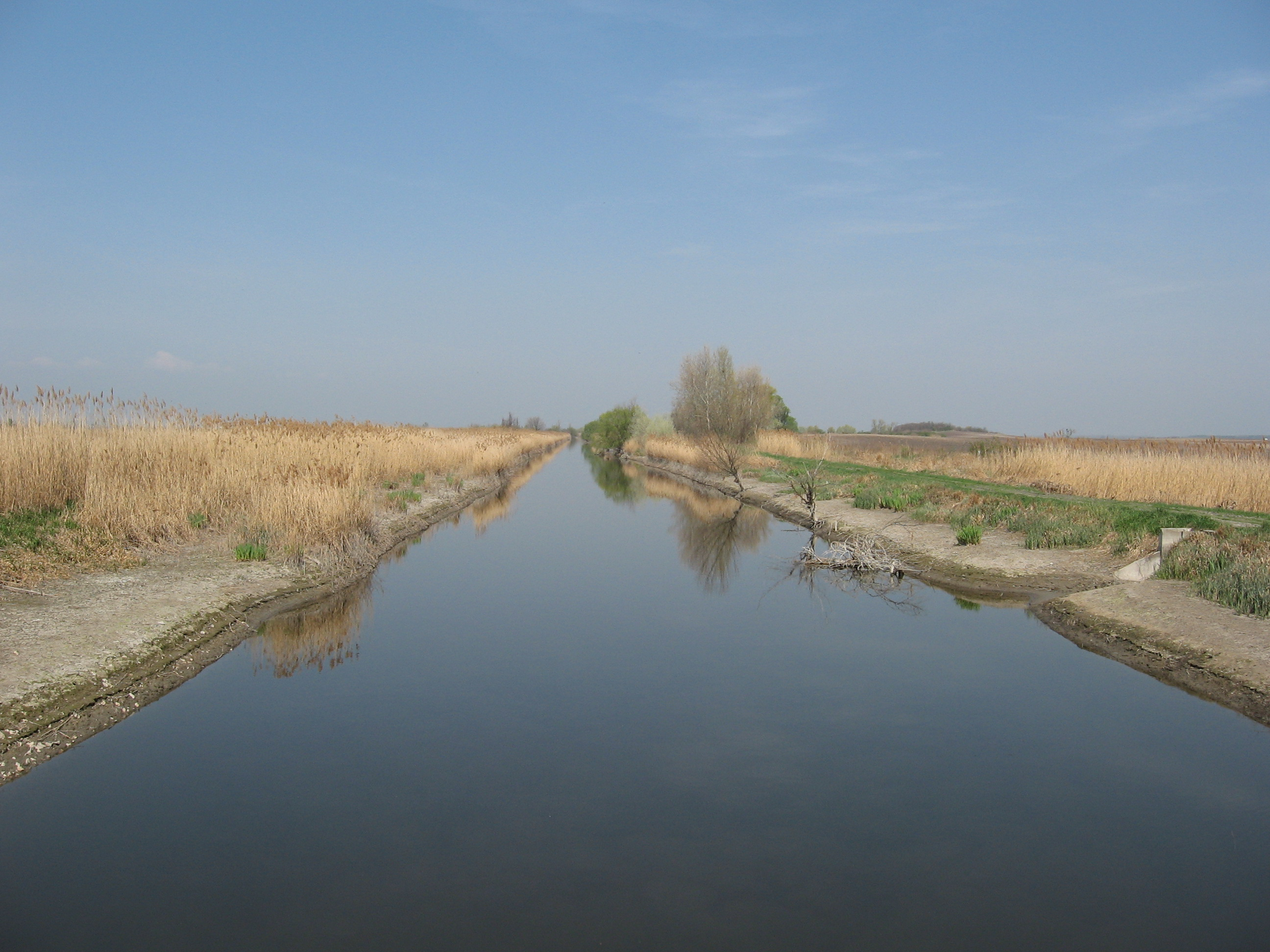

Location
- Country: Hungary
- Counties: Fejér and Tolna
- Towns: Székesfehérvár

Physical characteristics
- Source
  - location: Sárszentmihály, Fejér county
- Mouth: Sió
  - location: Sióagárd
  - coordinates: 46°23′13″N 18°40′07″E

Basin features
- Progression: Sió→ Danube→ Black Sea
- Tributaries
  - right: Séd

The Sárvíz is a river in Hungary. It is 110 kilometres (68 mi) long and flows as a left bank tributary into the Sió in the village of Sióagárd, which lies in Tolna County.
