= Marcal =

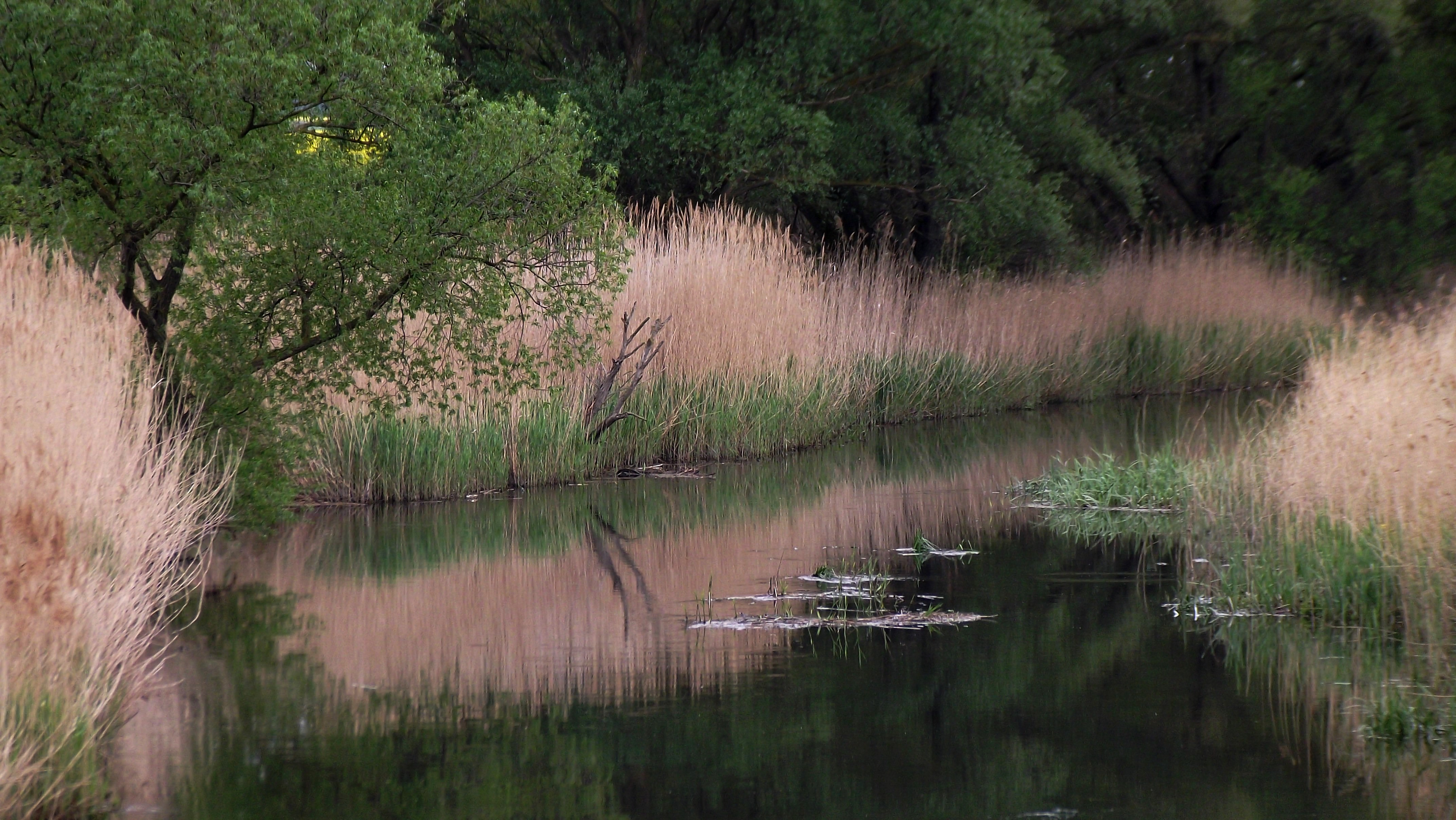

Location
- Country: Hungary

Physical characteristics
- Source: Bakony
  - location: Sümeg
  - elevation: 240 m (790 ft)
- Mouth: Rába
  - location: Győr
  - coordinates: 47.6363°N 17.5295°E
- Length: 100 km (62 mi)

Basin features
- Progression: Rába→ Danube→ Black Sea

The Marcal is a right tributary of the Rába which rises near Sümeg in the Bakony region of western Hungary. The river flows north and reaches Ukk on the Little Hungarian Plain. The Marcal follows a path similar to the Rába, and in many places the two rivers are only a kilometer apart. The two rivers meet in the city of Győr.

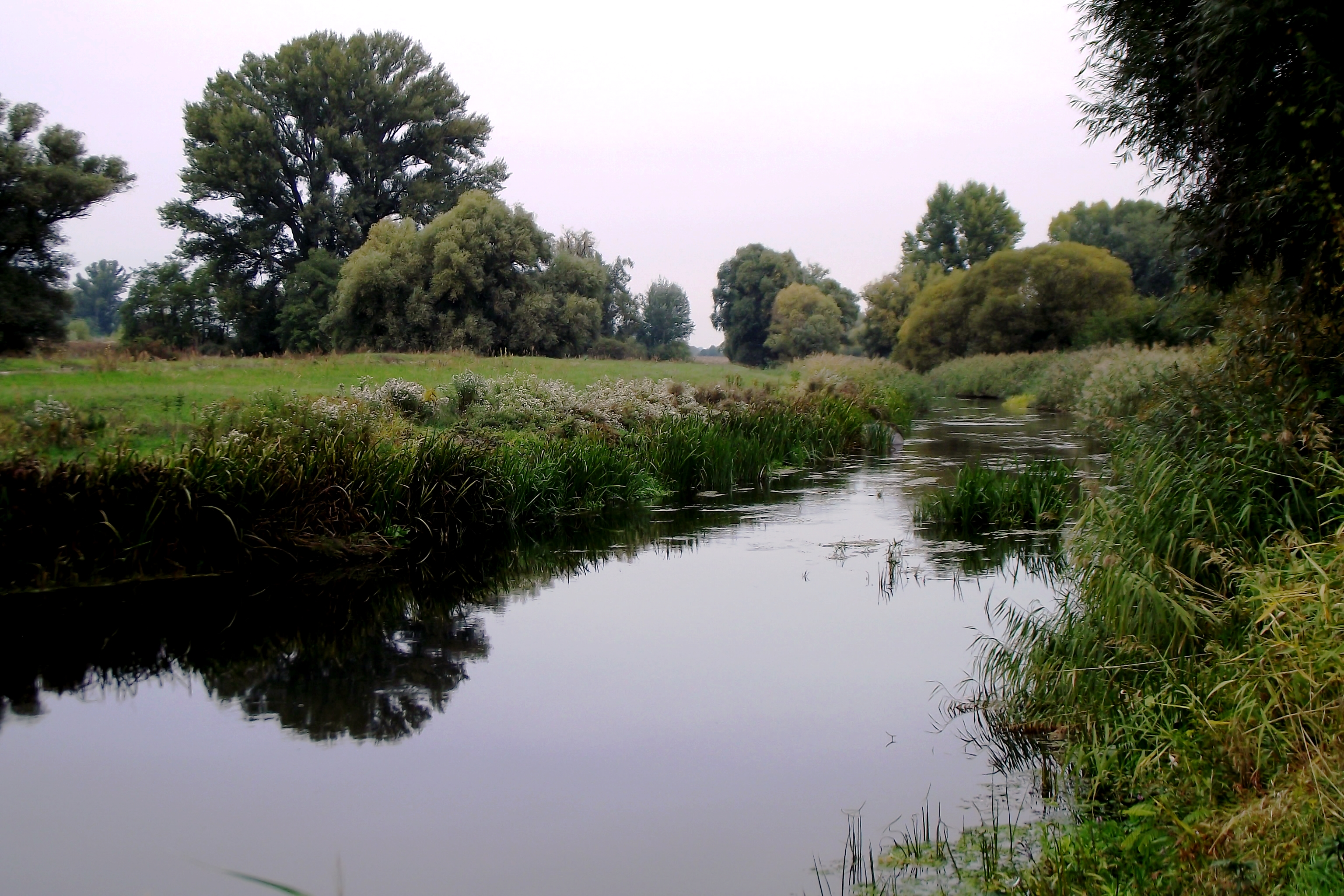

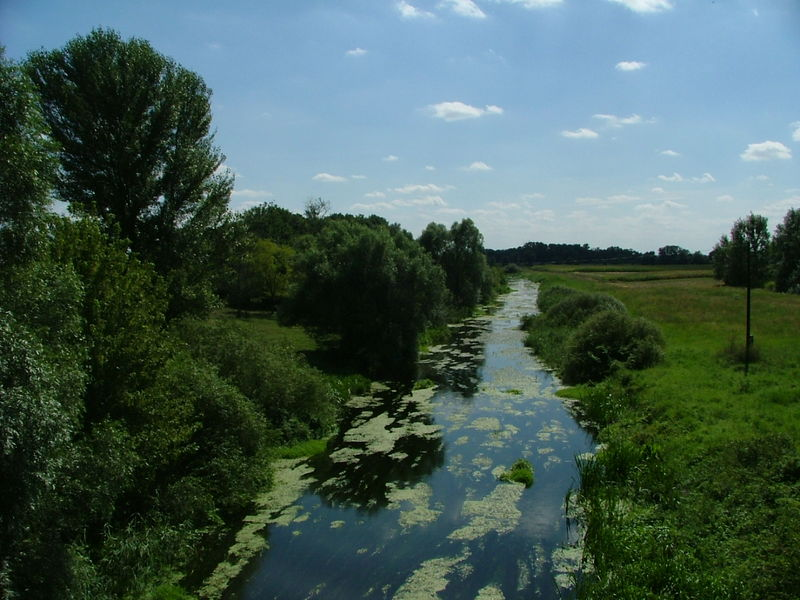

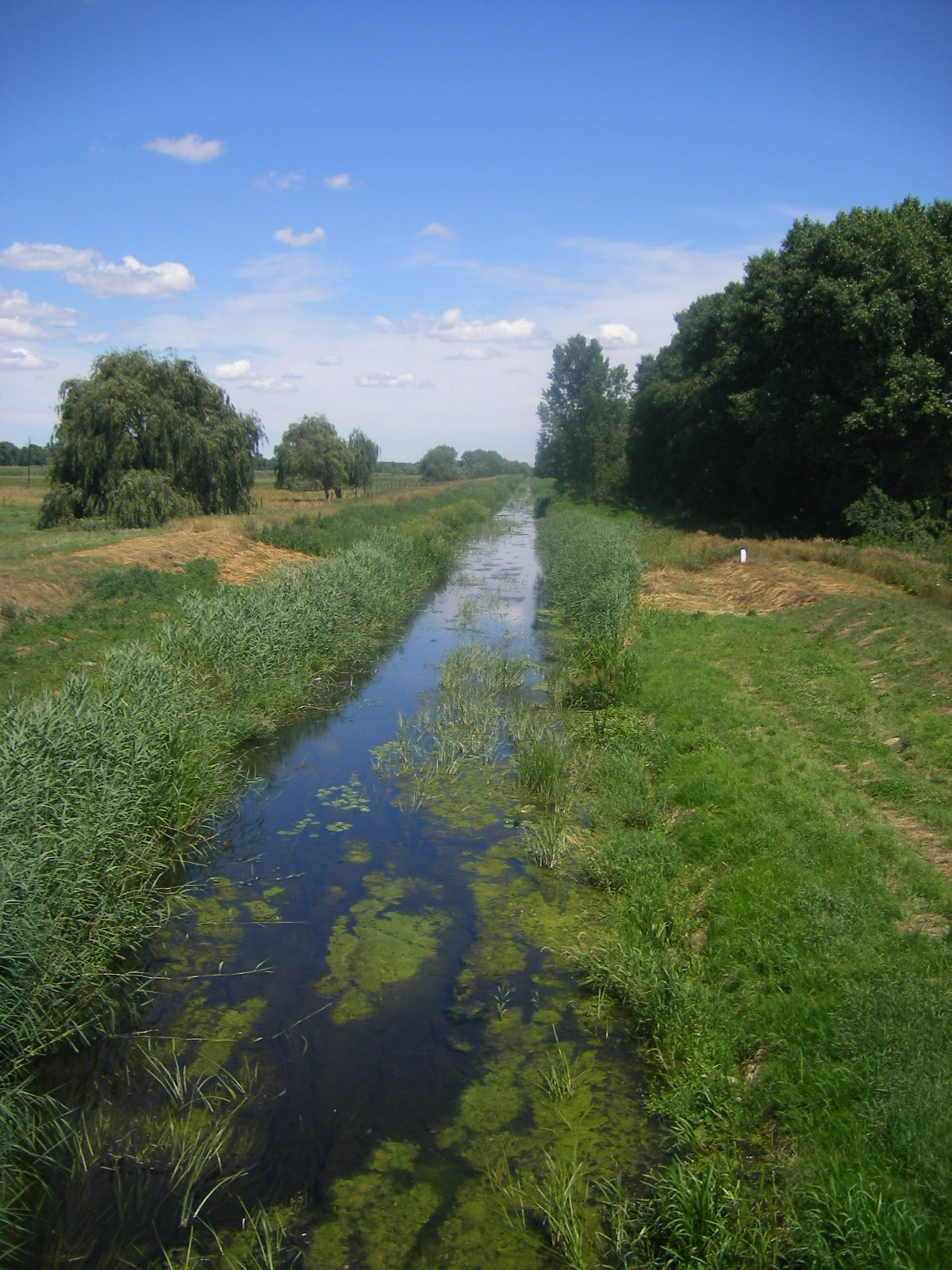

== Other ==
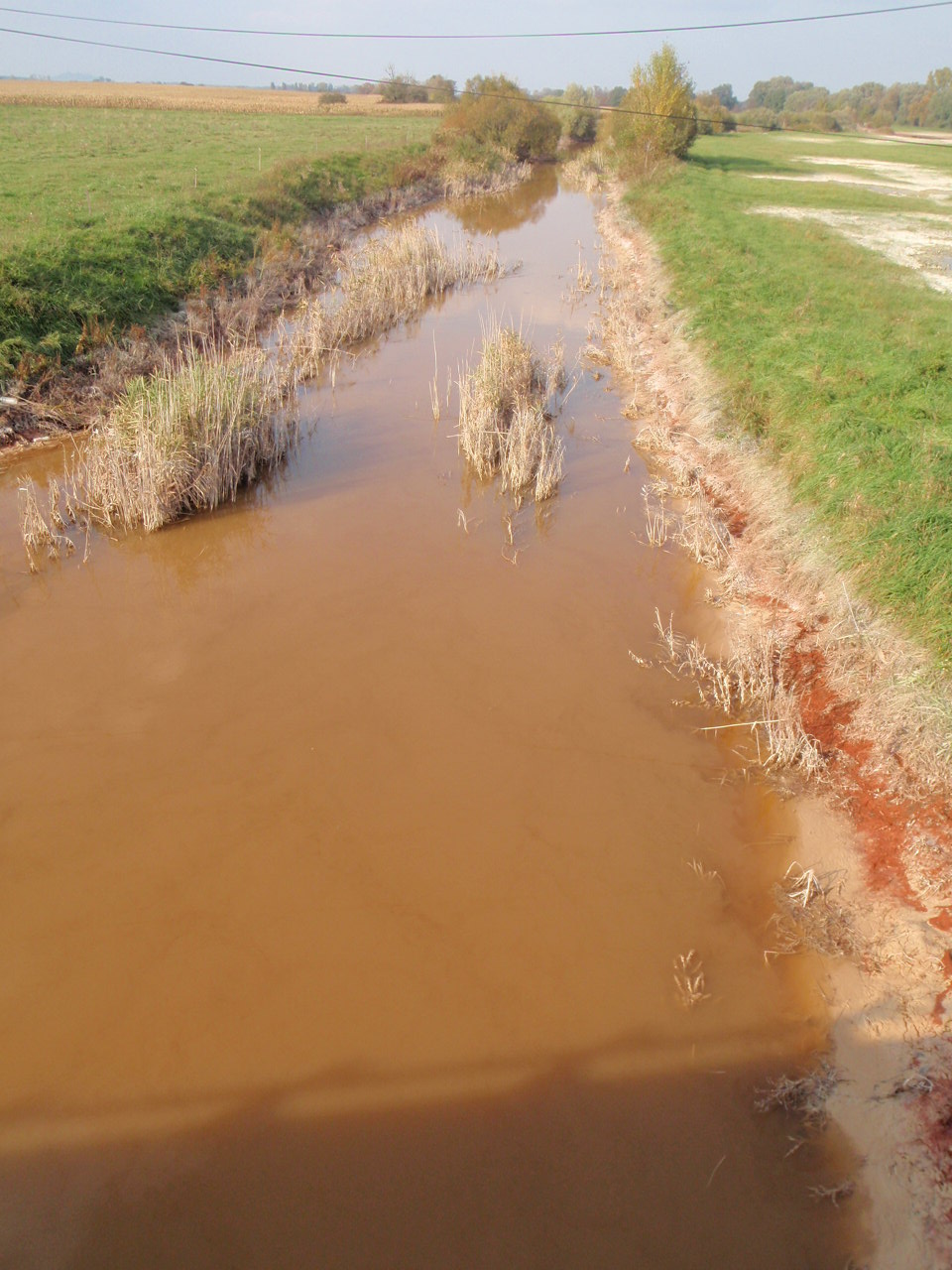
The Marcal one week after the Ajka alumina plant accident

In October 2010, the Marcal was contaminated in a chemical spill by red mud and temporarily suffered massive loss of aquatic life, from which it has since recovered.
