= Páka =

- Village
- Flag Coat of arms

- Location of Páka
- Coordinates: 46.593°N 16.649°E
- Country: Hungary
- Region: Western Transdanubia
- County: Zala
- District: Lenti

Area
  - Total: 23.18 km^{2} (8.95 sq mi)

Population (1 January 2025)
  - Total: 941
  - Density: 40.6/km^{2} (105/sq mi)
- Time zone: UTC+1 (CET)
  - Summer (DST): UTC+2 (CEST)
- Postal code: 8956
- Area code: (+36) 92
- Website: paka.hu

Páka is a village in Zala County, Hungary.
