= Fladnitz an der Teichalm =

- Municipality
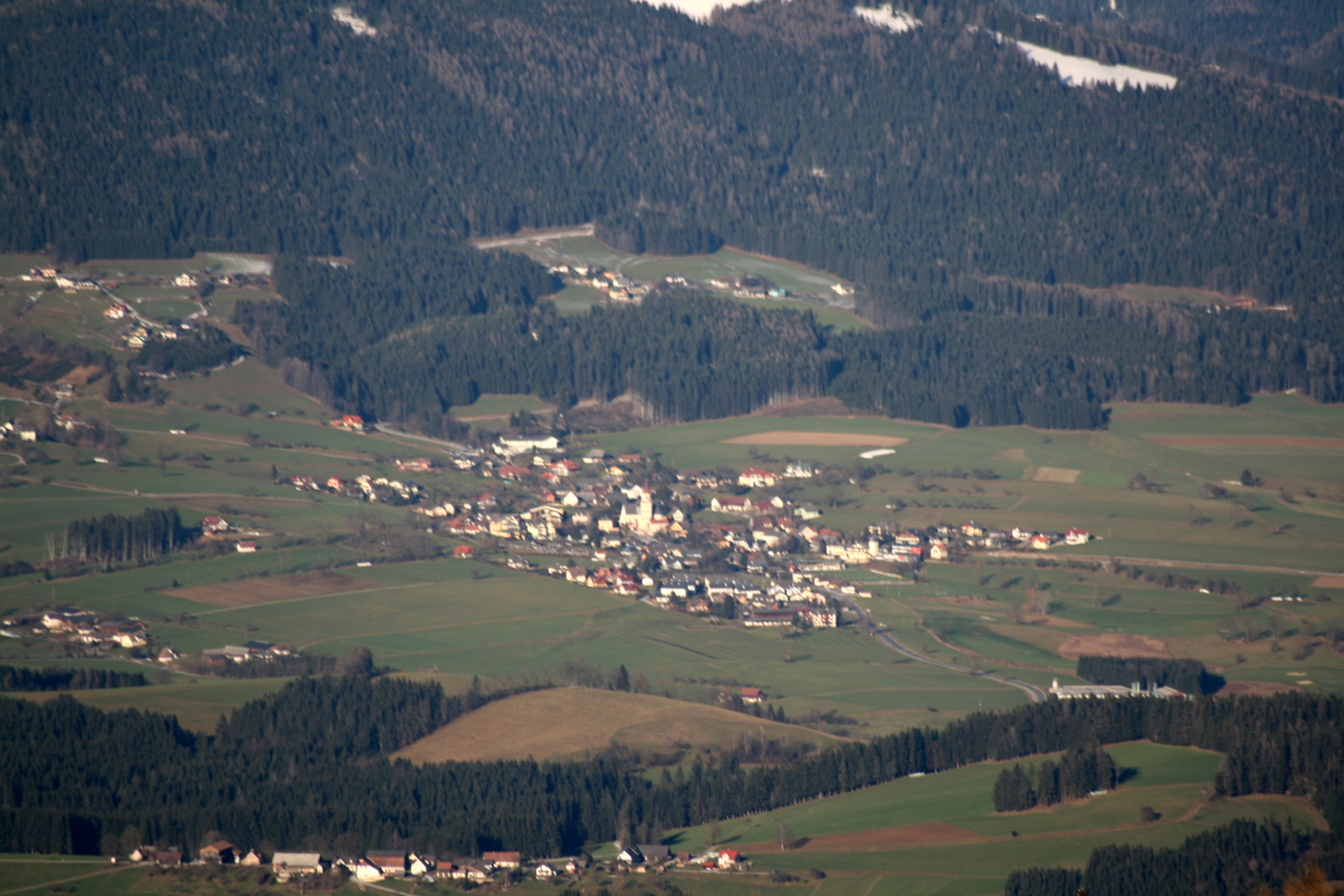
- Remote view of Fladnitz

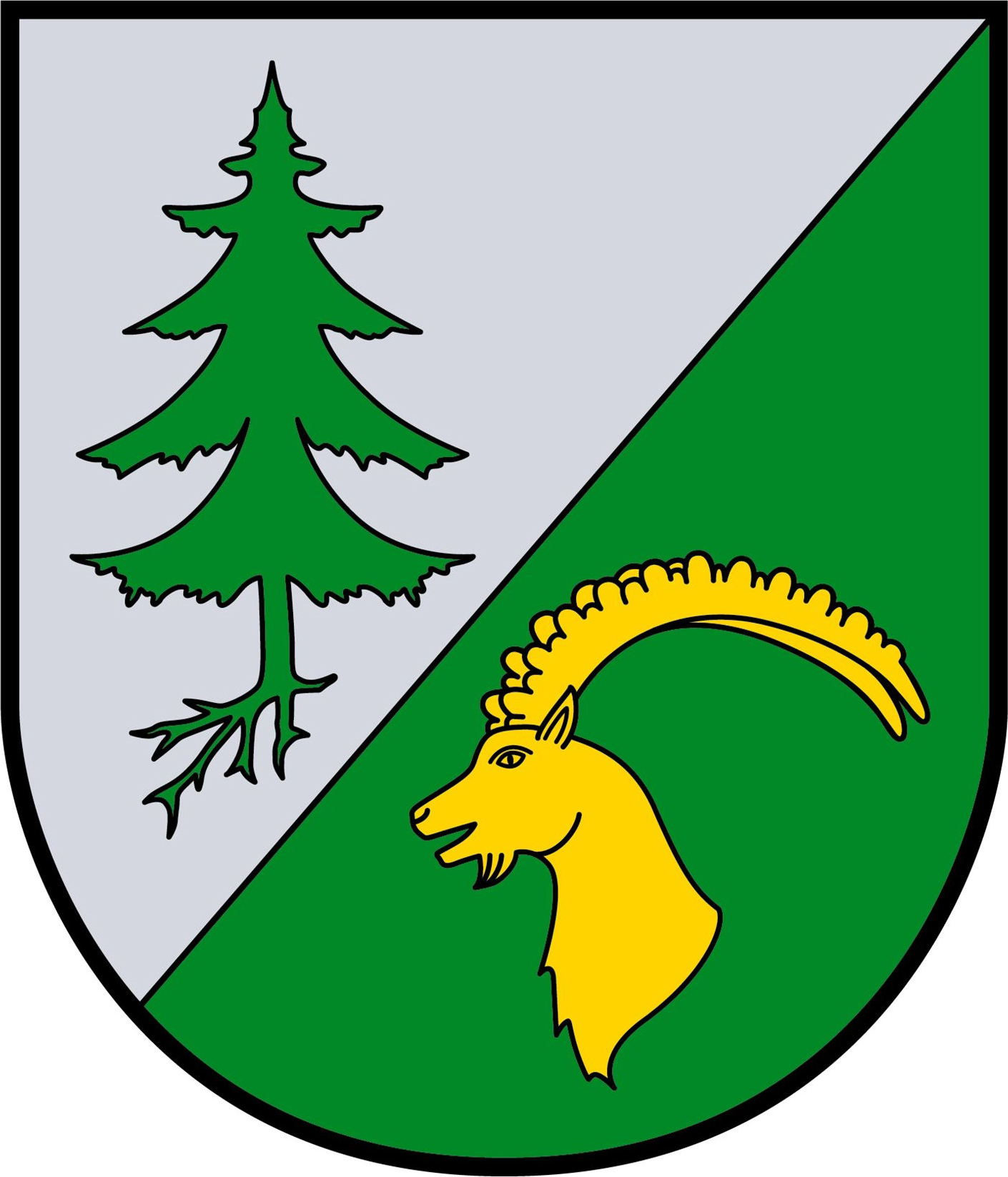
- Coat of arms

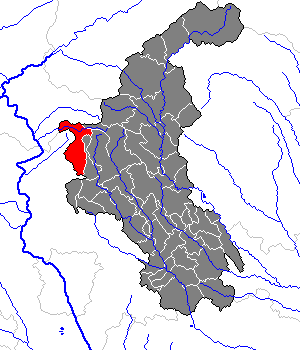
- Location within Weiz district

- Location within Austria
- Coordinates: 47°17′09″N 15°28′41″E
- Country: Austria
- State: Styria
- District: Weiz

Government
  - Mayor: Johann Leitner (ÖVP)

Area
  - Total: 66.37 km^{2} (25.63 sq mi)
- Elevation: 692 m (2,270 ft)

Population (2018-01-01)
  - Total: 1,792
  - Density: 27.00/km^{2} (69.93/sq mi)
- Time zone: UTC+1 (CET)
  - Summer (DST): UTC+2 (CEST)
- Postal code: 8163
- Area code: 03179
- Vehicle registration: WZ
- Website: www.fladnitz.at

Fladnitz an der Teichalm is a municipality in the district of Weiz in the Austrian state of Styria.
