= Rába =

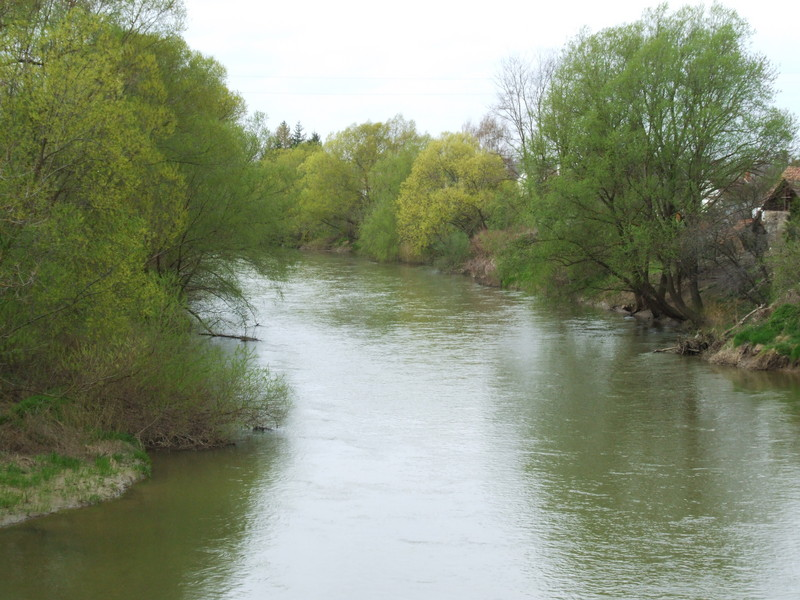
- The Rába at Molnaszecsőd

Location
- Countries: Austria and Hungary

Physical characteristics
- Source
  - location: Austrian Alps (Teichalm)
  - elevation: 1,150 m (3,770 ft)
- Mouth
  - location: Danube (Mosoni Duna branch), Győr
  - coordinates: 47°41′03″N 17°38′04″E
- Length: 298.2 km (185.3 mi)
- Basin size: 10,401 km^{2} (4,016 sq mi)
- Discharge
  - average: 18 m^{3}/s (640 cu ft/s)

Basin features
- Progression: Danube→ Black Sea
- Tributaries
  - left: Lafnitz, Pinka, Gyöngyös
  - right: Marcal

Ramsar Wetland
- Official name: Rába valley
- Designated: 6 October 2006
- Reference no.: 1645

The Rába (Hungarian pronunciation: [ˈraːbɒ]; German: Raab [ʁaːp]; Slovene: Raba [ˈɾáːba]) is a river in southeastern Austria and western Hungary and a right tributary of the Danube.

== Geography ==
Its source is in Austria, some kilometres east of Bruck an der Mur below Heubodenhöhe Hill. It flows through the Austrian states of Styria and Burgenland, and the Hungarian counties of Vas and Győr-Moson-Sopron. Of the Rába's 298.2 km (185.3 mi) length, about 100 km is in Austria. It flows into a tributary of the Danube (Mosoni-Duna) in northwestern Hungary, in the city of Győr. Its basin area is 10,401 km^{2} (4,016 sq mi). Towns along the Rába include Gleisdorf, Feldbach (both in Austria), and Szentgotthárd and Körmend (in Hungary). In the early Cenozoic the river used to flow in the opposite direction, but tectonic uplift reversed this flow.

== Name ==
The Rába was attested as Latin Arrabo and Greek Arabon (Ἀραβον) in antiquity, as Raba and Hrapa in AD 791, and as ad Rapam in 890. The various modern names of the river are derived from the Romance reflex Rābo. The name is probably Indo-European, but its origin is unknown.

== Rába Slovenes ==
The Rába Slovenes, living in the Rába Valley (Sln. Porabje, Hung. Vendvidék), are the westernmost group of Hungarian Slovenes. The Raba Valley is part of the wider region of Prekmurje.
