= Upper Válicka =

Small western Hungarian river

Coordinates: 46°51′37″N 16°52′56″E

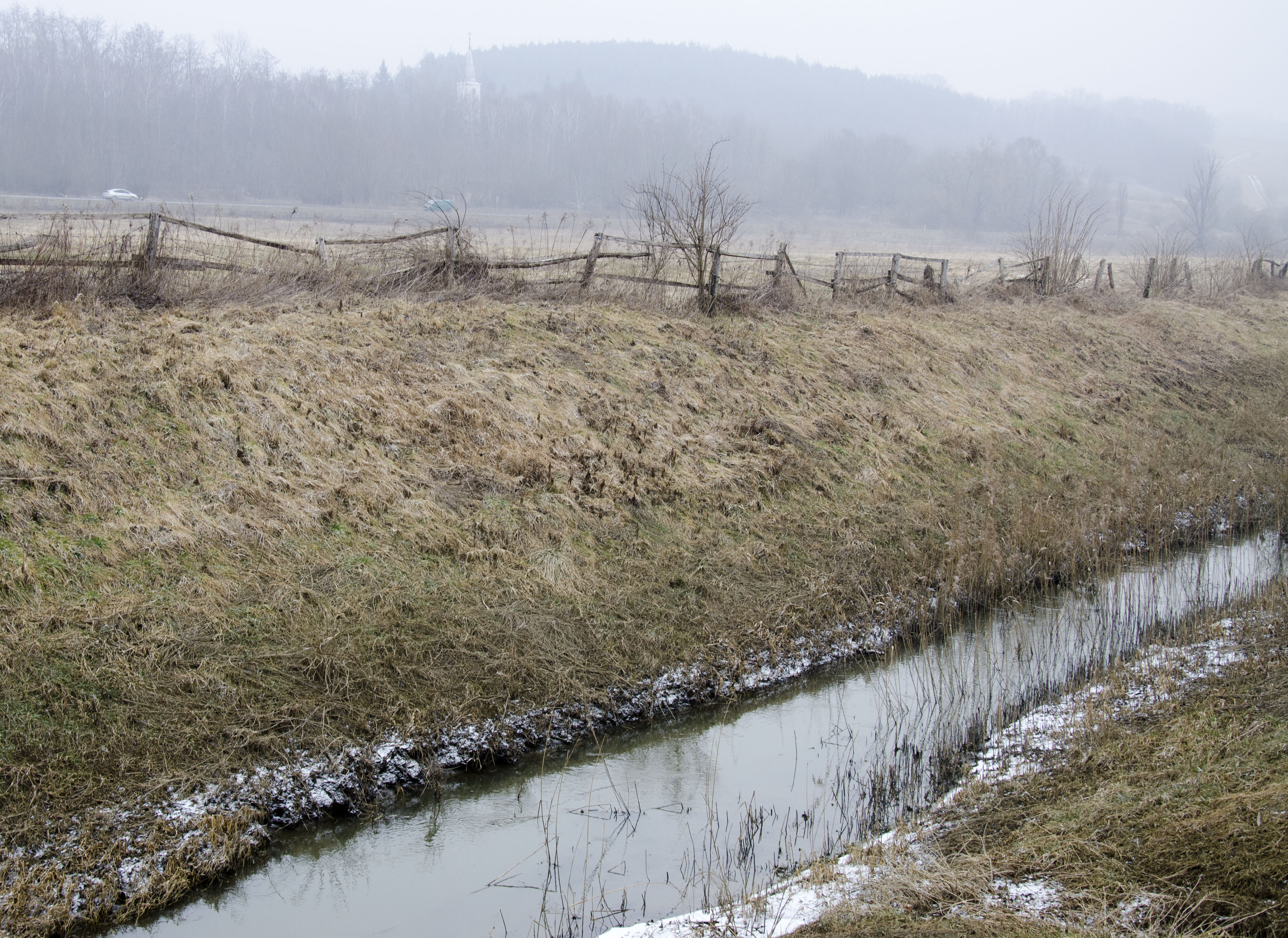
The Valicka brook/small river at Bocfolde with Csatar church's steeple in the background

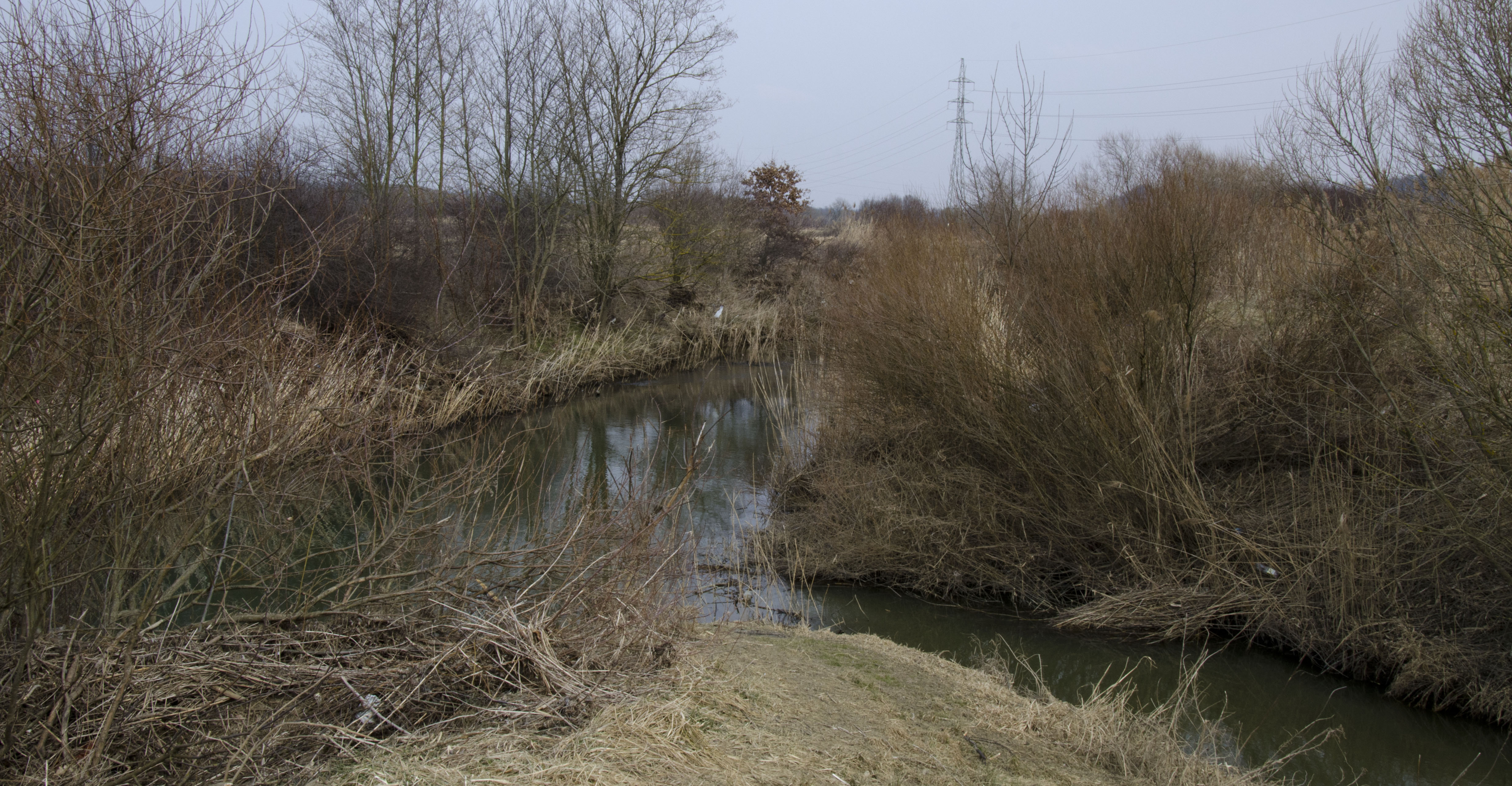
The Válicka brook/small river, at right, merges with Zala river at Csácsbozsok locale of Zalaegerszeg city, Zala county, Hungary.

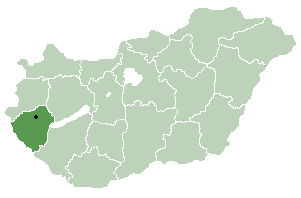
The river is located in Zala county

Válicka is a small river in Zala County of western Hungary. It is also known as Felső-Válicka, Baki-Valicka, Baki-Válicka, Eszaki-Valicka, Valicka, Valicka-patak, Válicka-patak and Északi-Válicka. It originates in the Southwest of Zala County and merges into the Zala River. It flows by several villages including Bak, Sárhida, Bocfölde, Csatár, Botfa, Csácsbozsok. It is 27.3 kilometres (17.0 mi) long and collects water from 104 square kilometres (40 sq mi).
