= Sió =

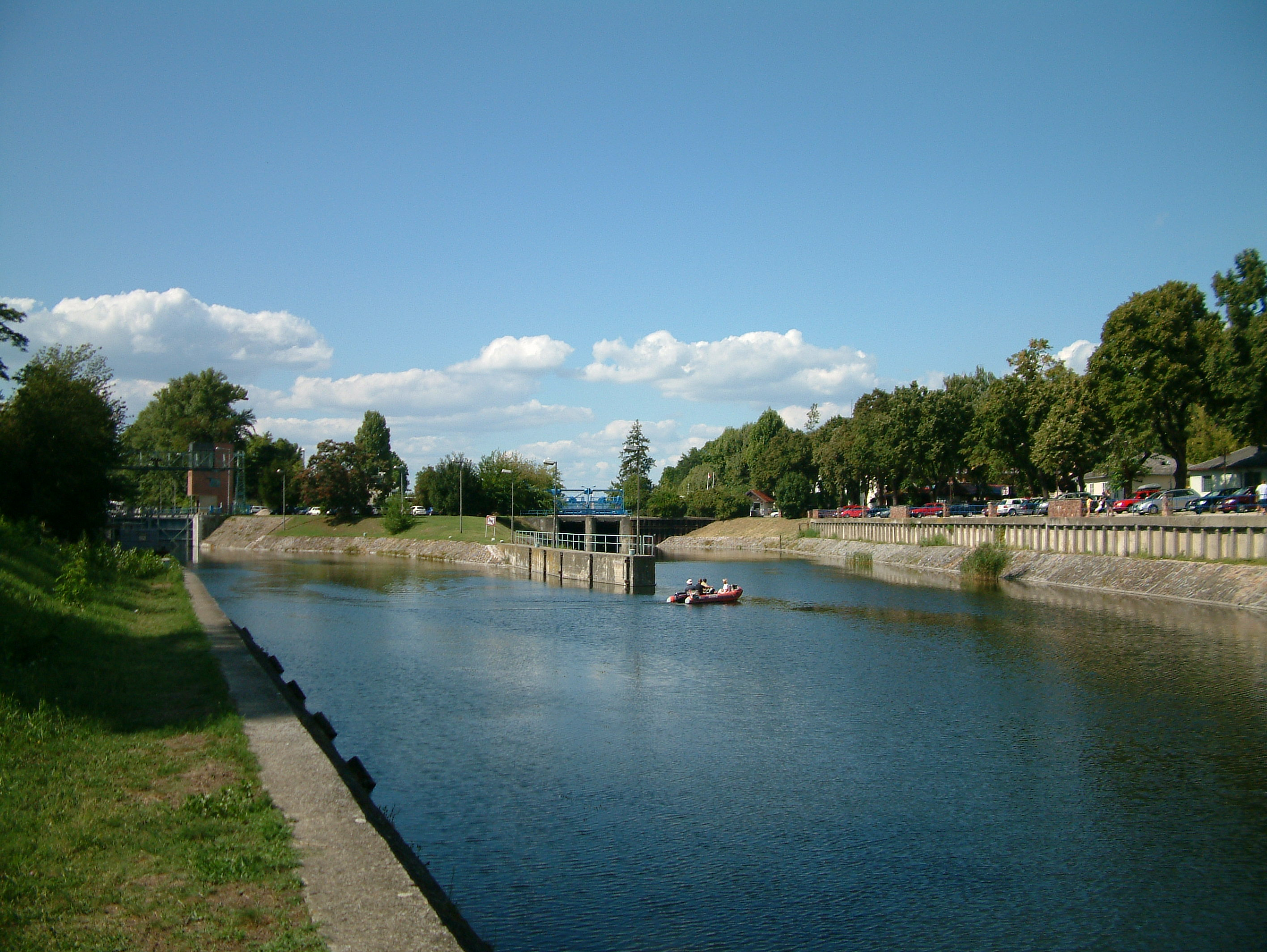

Location
- Country: Hungary
- Counties: Somogy; Fejér; Tolna
- Towns: Siófok; Simontornya; Szekszárd

Physical characteristics
- Source
  - location: Lake Balaton
- Mouth: Danube
  - location: Bogyiszló
  - coordinates: 46°20′16″N 18°53′41″E
- Length: 124 km (77 mi)
- Basin size: 14,693 km^{2} (5,673 sq mi)
- Discharge
  - location: mouth
  - average: 39 m^{3}/s (1,400 cu ft/s)

Basin features
- Progression: Danube→ Black Sea
- Tributaries
  - left: Sárvíz
  - right: Kapos

The Sió or Sió-csatorna (Sió-Channel) is a fully regulated river in midwest Hungary. It is the outlet, at the eastern end, of Lake Balaton, flowing out of the lake in Siófok. The 124 km (77 mi) long Sió flows into the river Danube near the city of Szekszárd. The Sió flows through the Hungarian counties Somogy, Fejér and Tolna, its main tributaries are Kapos from the right and Sárvíz from the left. The drainage basin of the Sió (including Balaton) covers more than a third of the Transdanubia region. The Sió's basin size is 14,693 km^{2} (5,673 sq mi) and its average discharge at the mouth is 39 m^{3}/s (1,400 cu ft/s).
