= Croatan (disambiguation) =

The Croatan were an Algonkian tribe living in what is now the Carolinas.

Croatan may also mean:

- Croatan Beach, Virginia Beach, Virginia, neighborhood of Virginia Beach
- Croatan Sound, an inlet on the North Carolina coast
- Croatan National Forest, a national forest in North Carolina
- Croatan High School, a public secondary school near Croatan National Forest
- USS Croatan, two American aircraft carriers of that name
- Croatan (World of Darkness), an extinct tribe of werewolves in the roleplaying game Werewolf: The Apocalypse
- Croatan, a 2005 studio album by Philadelphia metal band Starkweather released by Candlelight Records in 2006

== See also ==
- Croatoan (disambiguation)
- Croatian (disambiguation)
