= Croatians (disambiguation) =

Croatians may refer to:

- Croatians, inhabitants of Croatia, citizens of Croatia
- Ethnic Croatians, variant term for ethnic Croats

== See also ==
- Croatia (disambiguation)
- Croatian (disambiguation)
- Names of the Croats and Croatia
