= Demographics of Hungary =

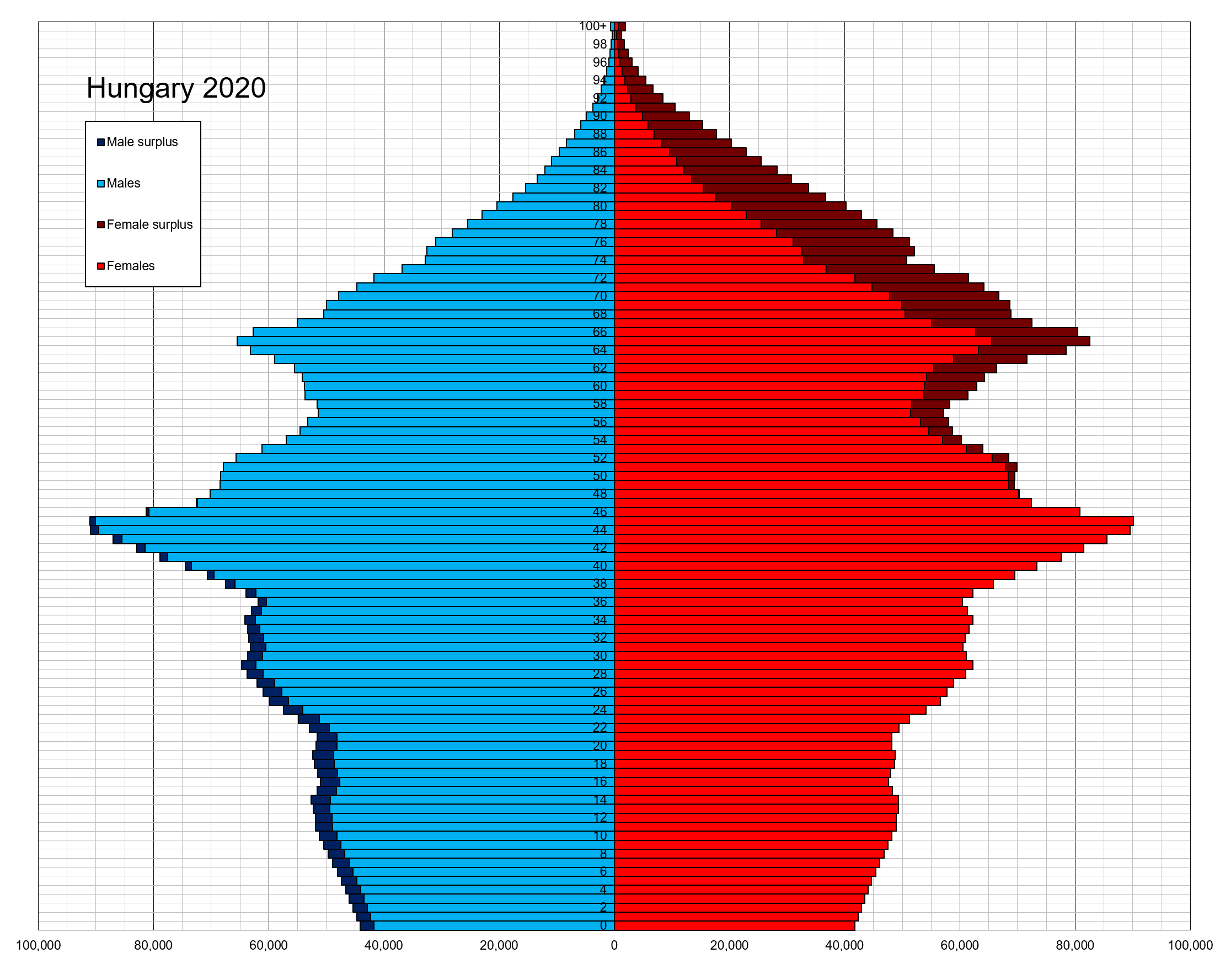
- Population Pyramid 2020
- Population: ▼9,488,428 (1 January 2026)
- Growth rate: −4.9 births/1,000 population (2020)
- Birth rate: 9.5 births/1,000 population (2020)
- Death rate: 14.3 deaths/1,000 population (2020)
- Life expectancy: 76.16 years (2019)
  - male: 72.86 years (2019)
  - female: 79.33 years (2019)
- Fertility rate: 1.52 children born/woman (2022)
- Infant mortality: 3.4 / 1000 live births (2020)
- Immigrant share: 7.1% (2024)

Age structure
- 0–14 years: 14.8%
- 15–64 years: 67.7%
- 65 and over: 17.5%

Sex ratio
- Total: 0.91 male(s)/female
- At birth: 1.06 male(s)/female (2013 est.)
- Under 15: 1.06 male(s)/female
- 15–64 years: 0.96 male(s)/female
- 65 and over: 0.59 male(s)/female

Nationality
- Nationality: noun: Hungarian(s) adjective: Hungarian
- Major ethnic: Hungarians (97.7%) and other European ethnic groups (2%)
- Minor ethnic: Non-European ethnic groups (less than 1%)

Language
- Spoken: Hungarian

Demographic features of the population of Hungary include population density, ethnicity, education level, health of the populace, economic status, religious affiliations and other aspects.

== Population ==
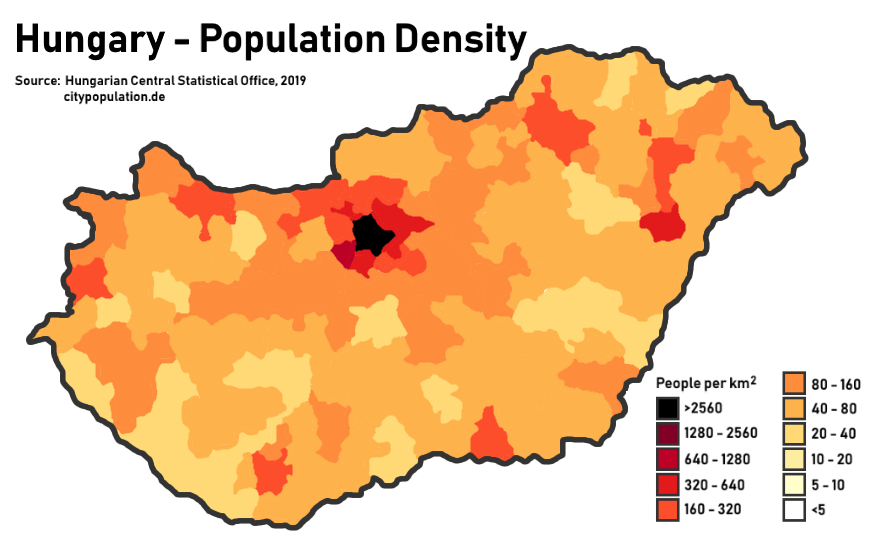
Population density in Hungary by district.

Hungary's population has been slowly declining since 1980. The population composition at the foundation of Hungary (895) depends on the size of the arriving Hungarian population and the size of the Slavic (and remains of Avar-Slavic) population at the time. One source mentions 200,000 Slavs and 400,000 Hungarians, while other sources often don't give estimates for both, making comparison more difficult. The size of the Hungarian population around 895 is often estimated between 120,000 and 600,000, with a number of estimates in the 400–600,000 range. Other sources only mention a fighting force of 25,000 Magyar warriors used in the attack, while declining to estimate the total population including women and children and warriors not participating in the invasion. In the historical demographics the largest earlier shock was the Mongol Invasion of Hungary, several plagues also took a toll on the country's population.

According to demographers, about 80 percent of the population was made up of Hungarians before the Battle of Mohács. However, the Hungarian ethnic group became a minority in its own country in the 18th century due to centuries long Ottoman and Habsburg wars, the resettlement policies and continuous immigration from neighboring countries. Major territorial changes made Hungary ethnically homogeneous after World War I. Nowadays, more than nine-tenths of the population is ethnically Hungarian and speaks Hungarian as the mother tongue.

Historical population

Year	Pop.	±% p.a.
1784	2,681,595	—
1870	5,011,310	+0.73%
1880	5,329,191	+0.62%
1890	6,009,351	+1.21%
1900	6,854,415	+1.32%
1910	7,612,114	+1.05%
1920	7,986,875	+0.48%
1930	8,685,109	+0.84%
1941	9,316,074	+0.64%

Year	Pop.	±% p.a.
1949	9,204,799	−0.15%
1960	9,961,044	+0.72%
1970	10,300,996	+0.34%
1980	10,709,463	+0.39%
1990	10,374,823	−0.32%
2001	10,200,298	−0.15%
2011	9,937,628	−0.26%
2022	9,610,403	−0.30%
2026	9,488,428	−0.32%

Note: Only present territory of Hungary

1400–2023 Historical population development on the territory of present-day Hungary

View source data.
View source data.
View source data.
View source data.

=== Population over time ===
Population of Hungary over time with estimated percentages of ethnic Hungarians within Hungary
Date	Estimated Population	Estimated Percentages of Hungarian people, with and without Inclusion of the Kingdom of Croatia	Notes
c. 900 AD	250,000–350,000; 500,000–600,000; 600,000; 1,000,000–1,500,000	66%	Size of the country was about 330 thousand square km, with a density of 3–4.5 or 0.56–1.06 persons per square km
1000	1,000,000–1,500,000		
1060	500,000–550,000		A density of 1.51–1.67 persons per square km.
1100	2,000,000		
1181	2,600,000		
1200	1,000,000–1,100,000		A density of 3.03–3.33 persons per square km (330 thousand square km).
1222	2,000,000	70–80%	The time of the Golden Bull. The last estimate before the Tatar invasion.
1242	1,020,000–1,220,000; 1,200,000		Population decreased after the Mongol invasion of Hungary (estimates of population loss range from 20% to 50%).
1300	1,400,000–1,600,000; 2,000,000; 3,000,000		
1348	5,000,000; 3,000,000		Before the plague (at the time of the Angevin kings).
1370	c. 2,000,000	60–70% (including Croatia)	
1400	3,000,000–3,500,000; 3,000,000		
1490	5,000,000; 4,500,000–5,000,000; 4,000,000–4,500,000; 4,000,000; 3,500,000–4,000,000; 3,400,000	90%; 80–85%; 80%; 77%; 75–80%	The last nationwide registry in Kingdom of Hungary before the Ottoman period was carried out in 1494–1495 on the commission of the royal treasury. Before the Ottoman conquest (about 3.2 million Hungarians).
1600	4,000,000–4,500,000; 3,500,000		Populations of Royal Hungary, Transylvania, and Ottoman Hungary combined.
1699	4,000,000; 3,500,000–4,000,000; 3,500,000	50–55%; 50%	At the time of Treaty of Karlowitz (not more than 2 million Hungarians).
1711	4,000,000; 2,500,000	53%; 45%	At the end of the Kuruc War, starting date of the organized resettlement.
1720	4,000,000–4,500,000; 4,000,000; 3,500,000; 2,600,000–4,000,000	55%; 45%; 44%; 40%; 35%	
1785-87	8,000,000		5% urban subjects.
1790	9,000,000; 8,500,000; 8,100,000–8,200,000	40%; 39%; 35%	End of the organized resettlement (around 800 new German villages had been established between 1711 and 1780).
1828	11,495,536		
1830		37% (44 percent in central Hungary)	
1837		44%; 37% (with Kingdom of Croatia)	
1846	12,033,399	40–45%; 41.6%; 36.5–40% (with Kingdom of Croatia)	Two years before the Hungarian Revolution of 1848.
1850	11,600,000	41.4%	
1857	13,830,870	44.5%	
1869	13,508,000	45.2%	
1880	13,749,603	46% (with the Kingdom of Croatia)	
1900	16,838,255	51.4%	
1910	18,264,533	54.4%; 48.1% (with Kingdom of Croatia)	5% Jews (estimated according to their religion).

Note: The data refer to the territory of the Kingdom of Hungary, and not that of the present-day republic.

== Demographic changes in pre-Trianon Hungary (1867–1914) ==
=== Population and ethnic composition (1869–1910) ===
Census data for the Kingdom of Hungary (including Croatia–Slavonia)
Year	Total Population (Hungary + Croatia–Slavonia)	Hungary Proper (excl. Croatia–Slavonia)	Croatia–Slavonia	Hungarians (absolute/%)	Romanians (absolute/%)	Slovaks (absolute/%)	Germans (absolute/%)	Croats/Serbs (absolute/%)	Other ethnicities
1869	~15.4 million	~13.6 million	~1.8 million	~6.9 million (45%)	~2.6 million (17%)	~2.0 million (13%)	~1.5 million (10%)	~1.4 million (9%)	~1.0 million (6%)
1880	~16.8 million	~14.8 million	~2.0 million	~7.6 million (45%)	~2.7 million (16%)	~2.0 million (12%)	~1.8 million (11%)	~1.7 million (10%)	~1.0 million (6%)
1890	~17.3 million	~15.1 million	~2.2 million	~7.8 million (44.8%)	~2.9 million (16.6%)	~2.2 million (12.5%)	~1.8 million (10.4%)	~1.8 million (10.2%)	~0.8 million (5.5%)
1900	~19.0 million	~16.8 million	~2.2 million	~8.7 million (45.8%)	~3.0 million (15.8%)	~2.3 million (12.1%)	~2.0 million (10.5%)	~2.0 million (10.5%)	~1.0 million (5.3%)
1910	~20.9 million	~18.3 million	~2.6 million	~10.0 million (54.5%)	~3.3 million (16.1%)	~2.0 million (10.7%)	~1.9 million (10.4%)	~1.5 million (8.3%)	~1.2 million (6.0%)

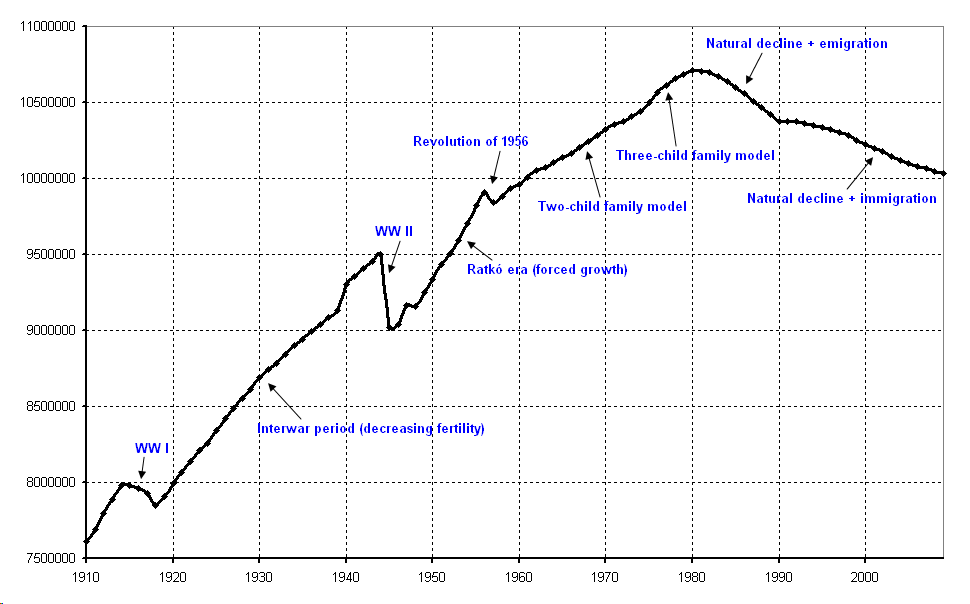
Population of Hungary (1910–2009, with comments)

Land	Mother tongues (1910 census)
Kingdom of Hungary	Hungarian (54.4%), Romanian (16.1%), Slovak (10.7%), German (10.4%), Ruthenian (2.5%), Serbian (2.5%), Croatian (1.8%)
Kingdom of Croatia-Slavonia	Croatian (62.5%), Serbian (24.6%), German (5.0%), Hungarian (4.1%)

Spoken languages in Transleithania (Hungary) (1910 census)
Land	Hungarian	Romanian	German	Slovak	Croatian	Serbian	Ruthenian	Other	Total
Danube Right Bank	72% (2,221,295)	0% (833)	18% (555,694)	0.6% (17,188)	5.5% (168,436)	0.5% (15,170)	0% (232)	3.4% (105,556)	14.8% (3,084,404)
Danube Left Bank	32.7% (711,654)	0% (704)	6.6% (144,395)	58.8% (1,279,574)	0.1% (2,294)	0% (200)	0% (393)	1.7% (36,710)	10.4% (2,175,924)
Danube–Tisza	81.2% (3,061,066)	0.1% (4,813)	9.5% (357,822)	2.1% (79,354)	0.1% (4,866)	4.1% (154,298)	0.3% (11,121)	4.1% (96,318)	18% (3,769,658)
Tisza Right Bank	53.5% (945,990)	0.1% (1,910)	5.6% (98,564)	25% (441,776)	0% (486)	0% (247)	14.3% (253,062)	1.6% (27,646)	8.5% (1,769,681)
Tisza Left Bank	61.8% (1,603,924)	24% (621,918)	3.2% (83,229)	3.1% (81,154)	0% (327)	0% (321)	7.5% (194,504)	0.3% (8,547)	12.4% (2,594,924)
Tisza–Maros	22.2% (474,988)	39.5% (845,850)	19.9% (427,253)	2.1% (44,715)	0.2% (4,950)	13.6% (290,434)	0.1% (3,188)	2.4% (50,391)	10.3% (2,141,769)
Transylvania	34.3% (918,217)	55% (1,472,021)	8.7% (234,085)	0.1% (2,404)	0% (523)	0% (421)	0.1% (1,759)	1.8% (48,937)	12.8% (2,678,367)
Fiume	13% (6,493)	0.3% (137)	4.6% (2,315)	0.4% (192)	26% (12,926)	0.9% (425)	0% (11)	54.8% (27,307, mostly Italian)	0.2% (49,806)
Croatia-Slavonia	4% (105,948)	0% (846)	5.1% (134,078)	0.8% (21,613)	62.5% (1,638,354)	24.6% (644,955)	0.3% (8,317)	2.6% (67,843)	12.6% (2,621,954)
Total	48.1% (10,050,575)	14.1% (2,949,032)	9.8% (2,037,435)	9.4% (1,967,970)	8.8% (1,833,162)	5.3% (1,106,471)	2.3% (472,587)	2.2% (469,255)	100% (20,886,487)

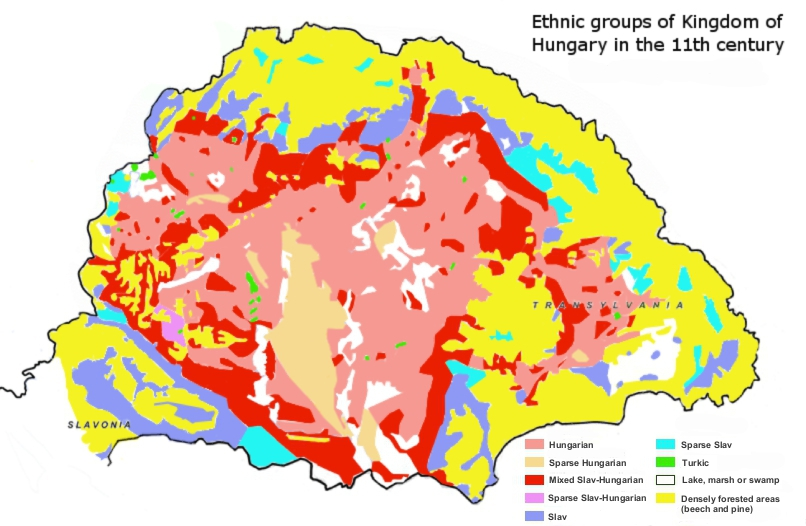
Kniezsa's (1938) view on the ethnic map of the Kingdom of Hungary in the 11th century, based on toponyms. Kniezsa's view has been criticized by many scholars, because of its non-compliance with later archaeological and onomastics research, but his map is still regularly cited in modern reliable sources. One of the most prominent critics of this map was Emil Petrovici.

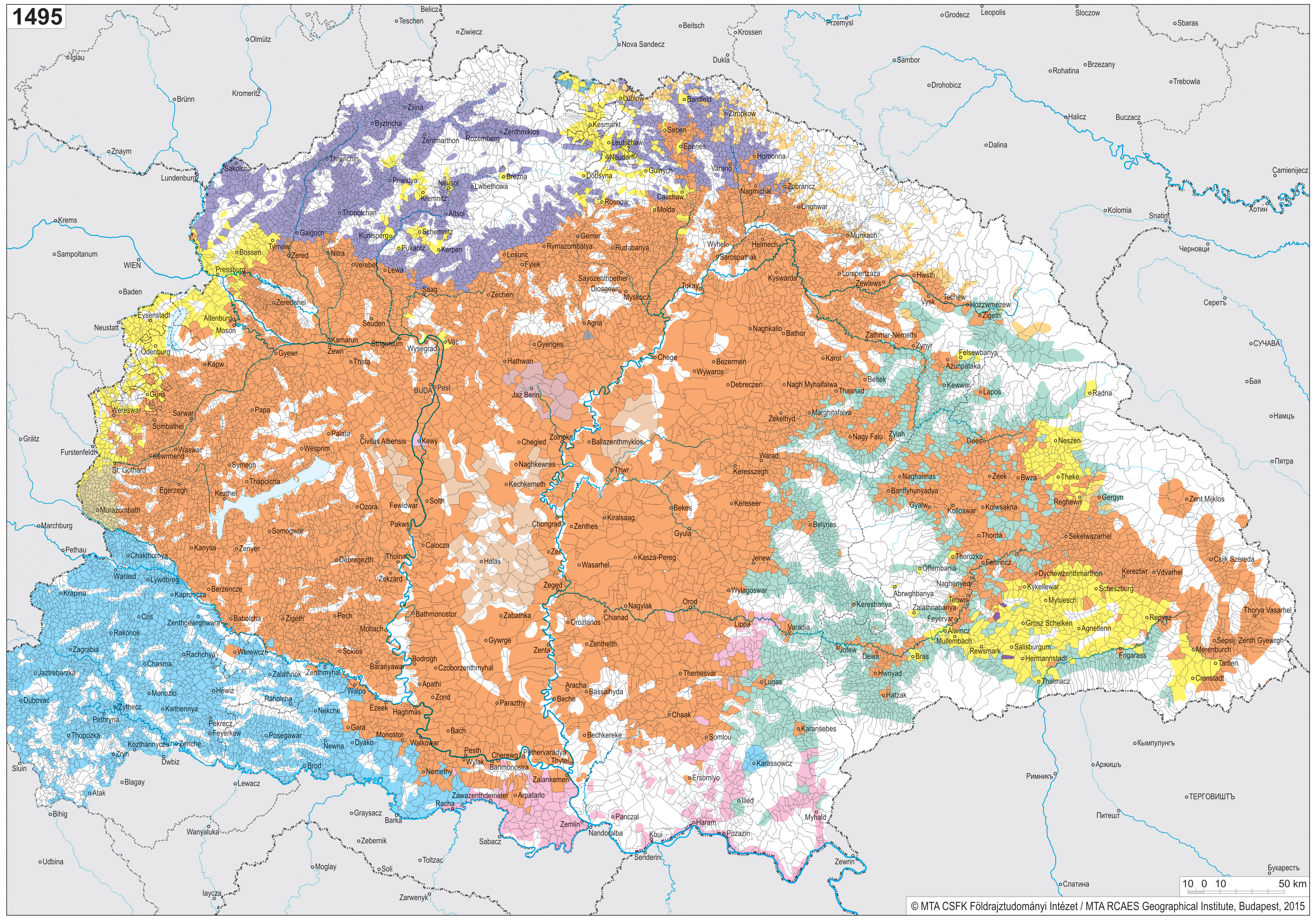
Estimated ethnic map of the Kingdom of Hungary in 1495, created by the Hungarian Academy of Sciences based on their research. Hungarians are depicted in orange. The date 1495 is based on a nationwide registry conducted in the Kingdom of Hungary by commission of the royal treasury. The map shows the estimated absolute or relative linguistic majority of the local population based on the family names of taxpayers recorded in national or domanial registers, the linguistic analysis of the names of geographic objects and on various scholarly sources.

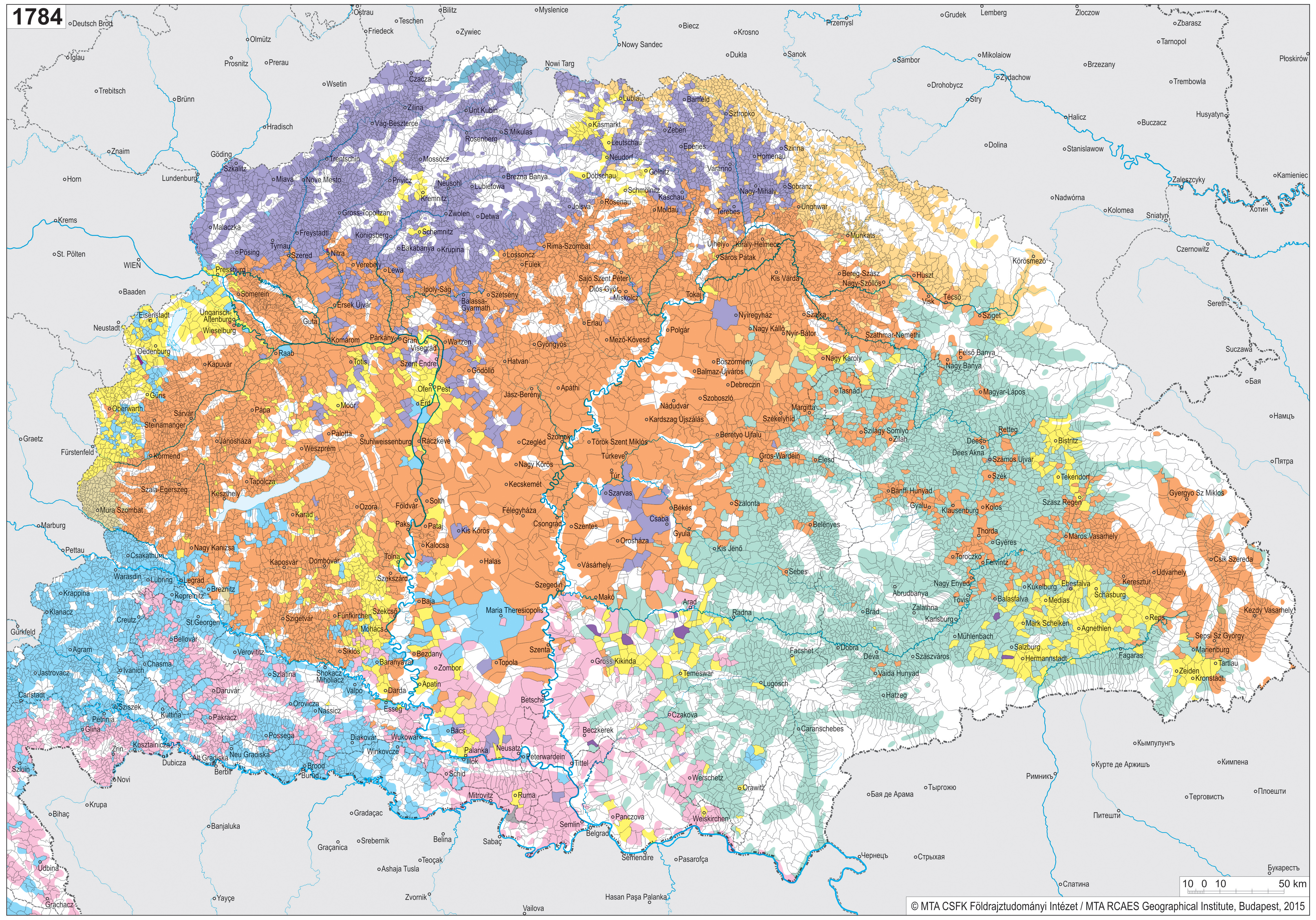
Ethnic map of the Kingdom of Hungary in 1784 by the Hungarian Academy of Sciences, based on their researches. Hungarians are depicted in orange. The ethnic pattern of Hungary changed due to the centuries long wars and migration movements.

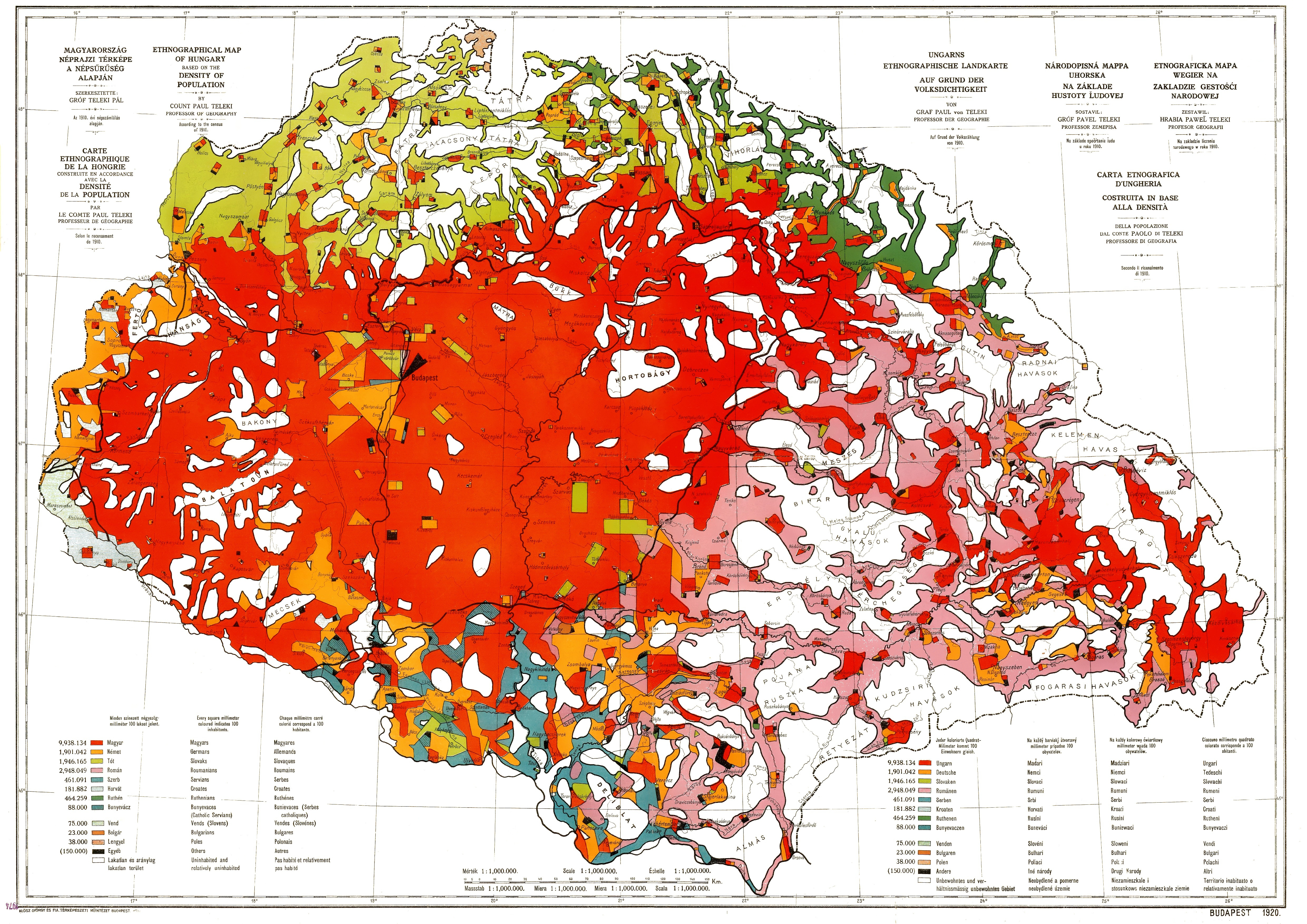
The Red Map. Ethnic map of the Hungary proper publicized by the Hungarian delegation. Regions with population density below 20 persons/km^{2} are left blank and the corresponding population is represented in the nearest region with population density above that limit. The map is a smaller version of a more detailed map by Pál Teleki, in which a vibrant, dominant red color was deliberately chosen to mark Hungarians while the light purple color of the Romanians, who were already the majority in the whole of Transylvania back then, is shadow-like.

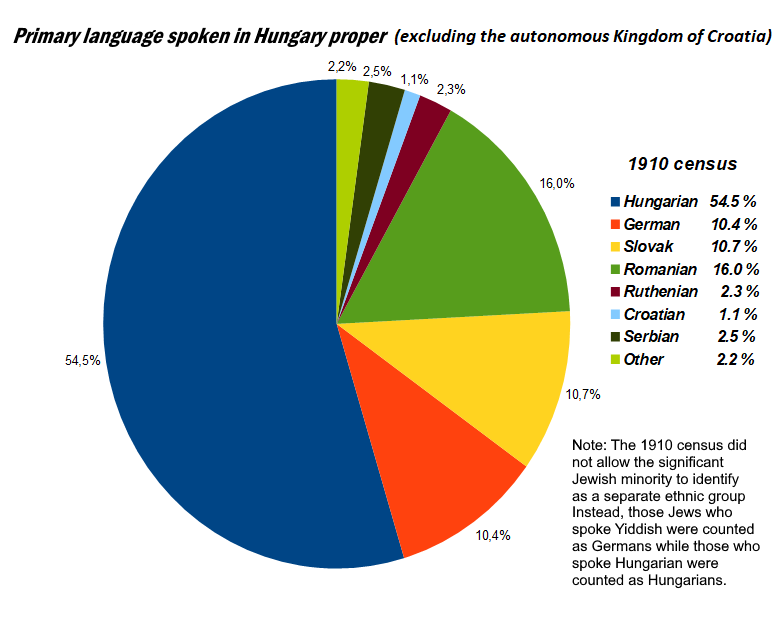
In the Kingdom of Hungary, the 1910 census was based on mother tongue. According to the census, 54.4% of the inhabitants of Hungary were recorded to speak Hungarian as their native language. This number included the Jewish ethnic group (around 5% of the population according to a separate census on religion and about 23% of Budapest's citizenry) who were overwhelmingly Hungarian-speaking (the Jews tending to declare German as mother tongue due to the immigration of Jews of Yiddish/German mother tongue).

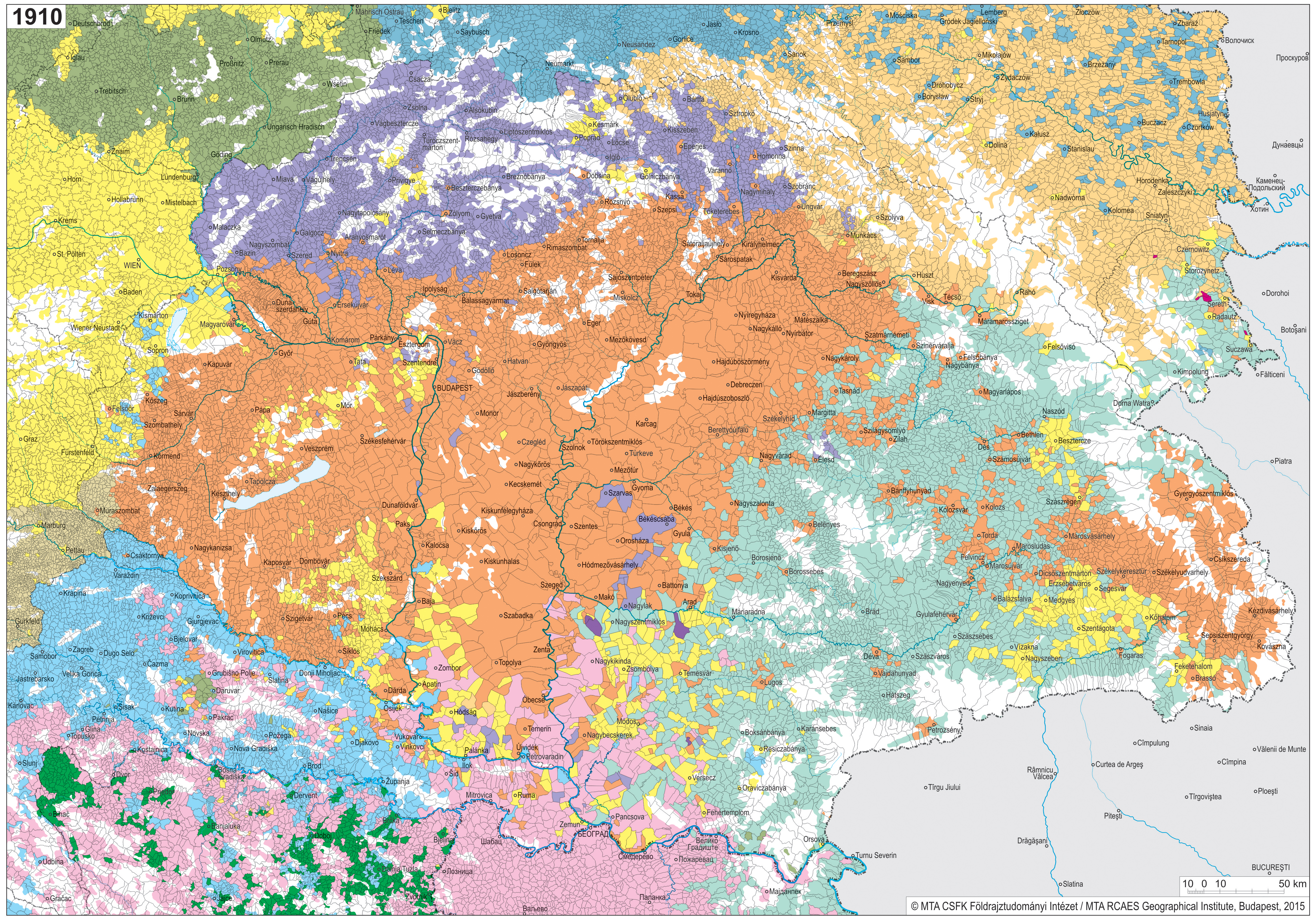
Ethnic map of the Kingdom of Hungary in 1910, based on the 1910 Hungarian census.

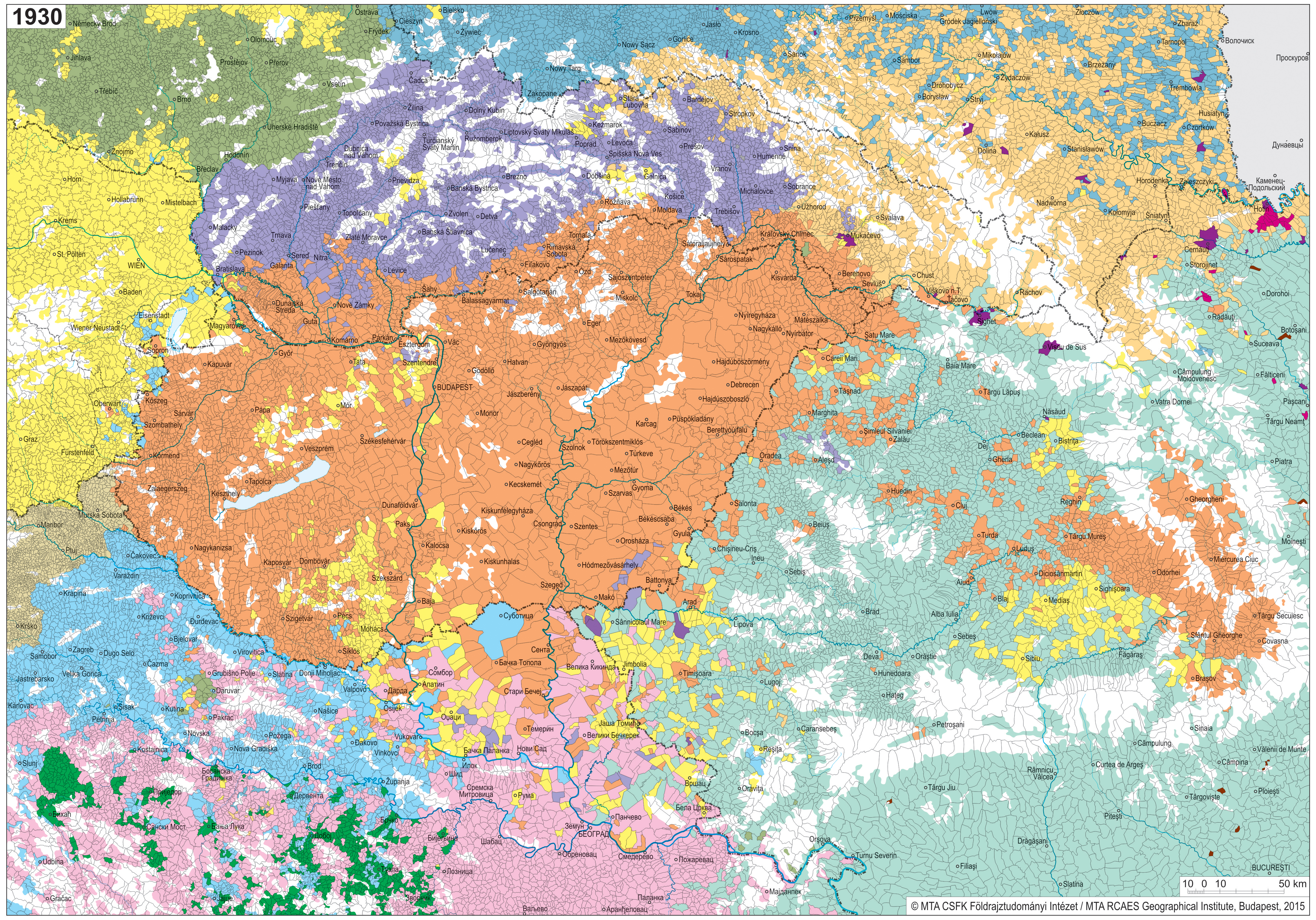
Ethnic map of the Kingdom of Hungary and the Carpatho-Pannonian area in 1930, based on the Hungarian (1930), Czechoslovak (1930), Romanian (1930), Yugoslav (1931), Polish (1931), and Austrian (1934) censuses.

=== Fertility ===
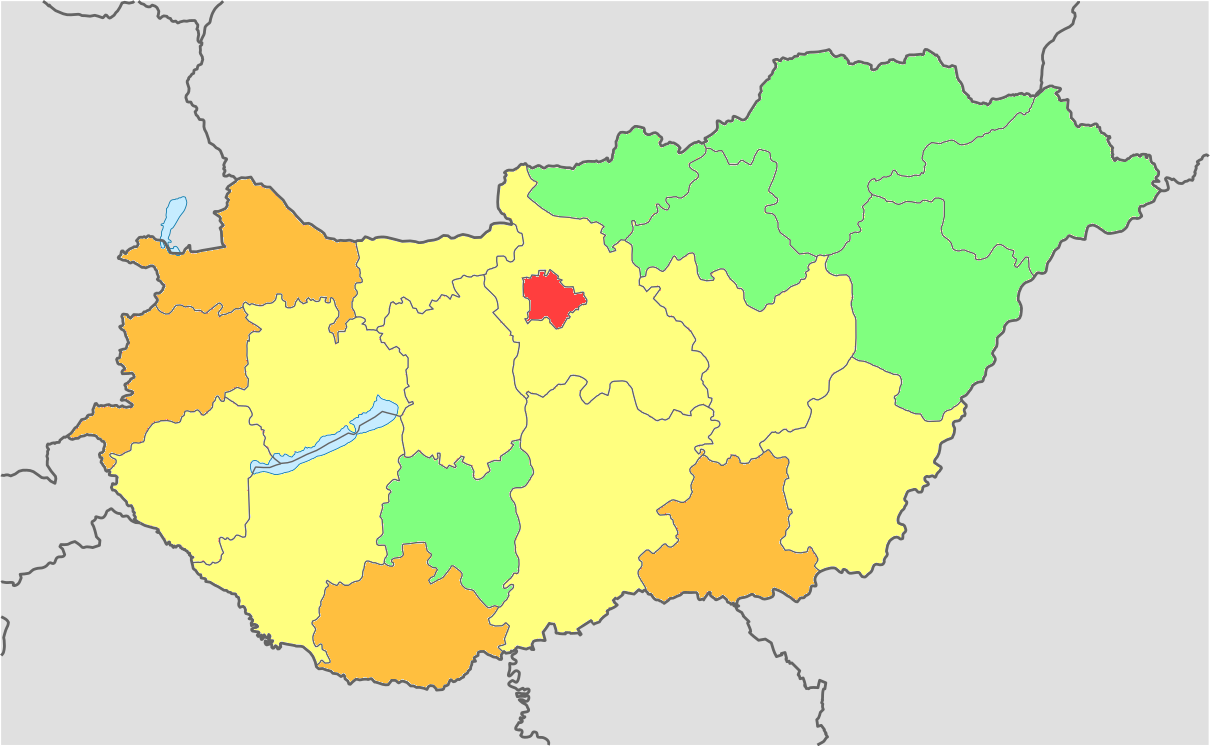
Hungary fertility rate by county (2021) 1.7–1.9 1.5–1.7 1.4–1.5 1.3–1.4 < 1.3

The total fertility rate is the number of children born per woman. It is based on fairly good data for the entire period in the present-day Hungary. Sources: Our World In Data and Gapminder Foundation.

Years	1850	1851	1852	1853	1854	1855	1856	1857	1858	1859	1860
Total Fertility Rate in Hungary	5.18	5.15	5.12	5.09	5.06	5.03	5	4.97	4.94	4.91	4.88

Years	1861	1862	1863	1864	1865	1866	1867	1868	1869	1870
Total Fertility Rate in Hungary	4.85	5.11	5.41	5.03	5.11	5.02	4.64	5.09	5.12	5.14

Years	1871	1872	1873	1874	1875	1876	1877	1878	1879	1880
Total Fertility Rate in Hungary	5.23	4.96	5.18	5.23	5.55	5.61	5.29	5.23	5.58	5.23

Years	1881	1882	1883	1884	1885	1886	1887	1888	1889	1890
Total Fertility Rate in Hungary	5.28	5.4	5.5	5.59	5.48	5.57	5.41	5.36	5.35	4.93

Years	1891	1892	1893	1894	1895	1896	1897	1898	1899	1900
Total Fertility Rate in Hungary	5.2	4.96	5.25	5.08	5.48	5.11	4.97	4.95	4.62	4.79

Year	Total Fertility Rate
1900	5.32
1910	4.86
1920	3.80
1930	2.84
1941	2.48
1949	2.54
1955	2.81
1960	2.02
1965	1.82
1970	1.98
1975	2.34
1980	1.91
1985	1.85

Year	Total Fertility Rate
1990	1.86
1995	1.57
2000	1.32
2005	1.30
2010	1.25
2015	1.45
2019	1.51
2020	1.59
2021	1.61
2022	1.55
2023	1.51
2024	1.38

Total Fertility Rate by county

County	1980	1990	2001	2011
Baranya	1.70	1.65	1.52	1.47
Bács-Kiskun	1.81	1.73	1.59	1.56
Békés	1.82	1.75	1.62	1.57
Borsod-Abaúj-Zemplén	1.88	1.83	1.72	1.66
Csongrád	1.59	1.55	1.44	1.41
Fejér	1.85	1.79	1.62	1.56
Győr-Moson-Sopron	1.81	1.73	1.56	1.49
Hajdú-Bihar	1.92	1.82	1.65	1.56
Heves	1.79	1.69	1.57	1.53
Jász-Nagykun-Szolnok	1.90	1.80	1.67	1.62
Komárom-Esztergom	1.80	1.73	1.58	1.53
Nógrád	1.84	1.76	1.64	1.60
Pest	1.76	1.69	1.54	1.48
Somogy	1.74	1.68	1.58	1.53
Szabolcs-Szatmár-Bereg	2.21	2.05	1.85	1.75
Tolna	1.83	1.76	1.65	1.60
Vas	1.82	1.72	1.58	1.51
Veszprém	1.88	1.79	1.64	1.58
Zala	1.78	1.73	1.56	1.52
Budapest	1.25	1.27	1.17	1.13
All	1.71	1.65	1.53	1.47

Source: 2011 census

=== Life expectancy ===
Life expectancy in Hungary since 1900

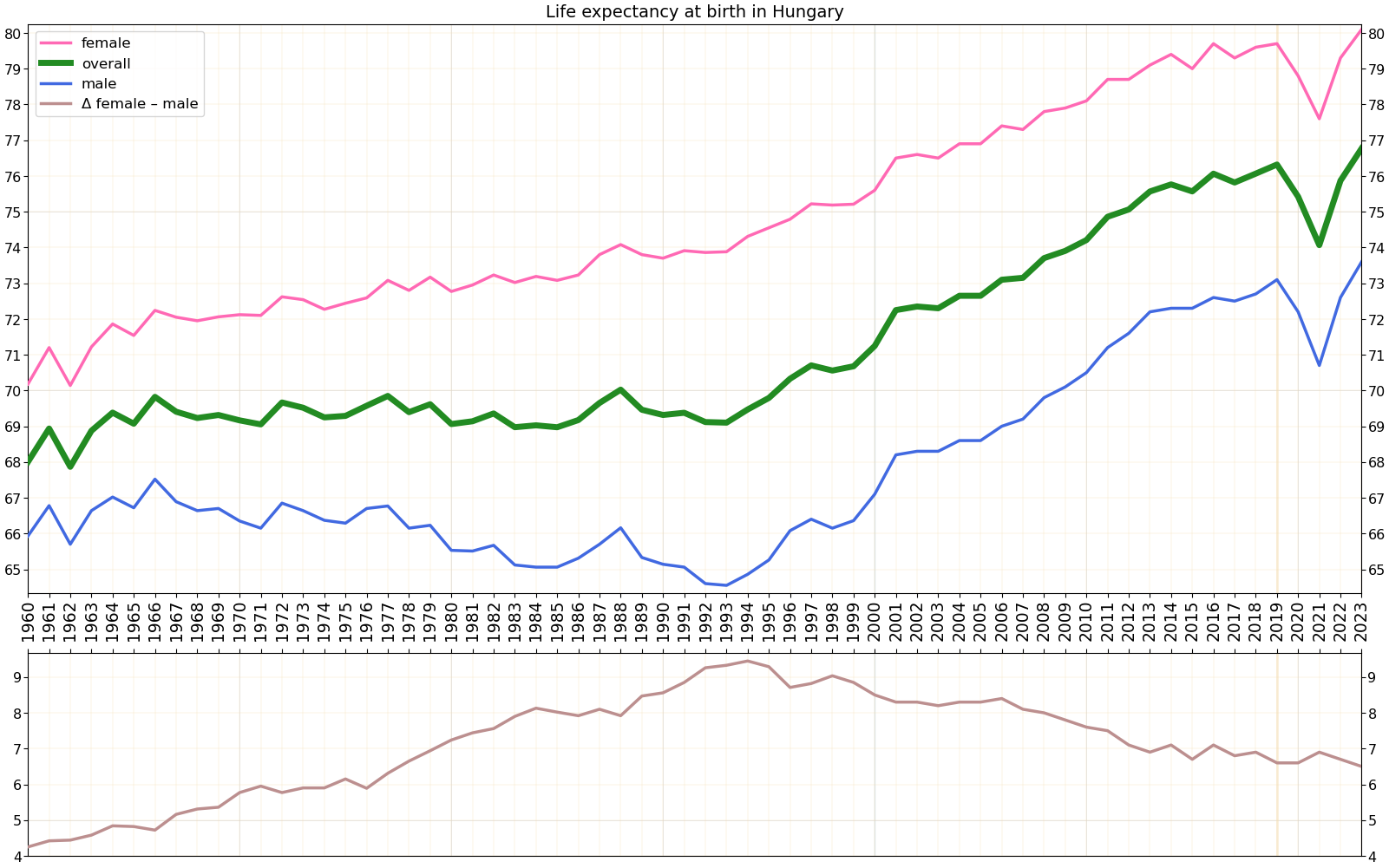
Life expectancy in Hungary since 1960 by gender

Period	Life expectancy in Years
1950–1955	64.01
1955–1960	▲66.91
1960–1965	▲68.79
1965–1970	▲69.45
1970–1975	▼69.41
1975–1980	▲69.59
1980–1985	▼69.08
1985–1990	▲69.42
1990–1995	▼69.41
1995–2000	▲70.88
2000–2005	▲72.54
2005–2010	▲73.74
2010–2015	▲75.26
2015–2020	▲76.65

==== Infant mortality rate ====
The infant mortality rate (IMR) decreased considerably after WW II. In 1949, the IMR was 91.0. The rate decreased to 47.6 in 1960, 35.9 in 1970, 23.2 in 1980, 14.8 in 1990, 9.2 in 2000 and reached an all-time low in 2023 at 3.1 per 1000 live born children.

== Vital statistics ==
Source: Hungarian Central Statistical Office

Notable events in Hungarian demographics:

- 1914–1918 – First World War
- 1941–1945 – Second World War

	Average population (January 1)	Live births	Deaths	Natural change	Crude birth rate (per 1000)	Crude death rate (per 1000)	Natural change (per 1000)	Crude migration change (per 1000)	Total fertility rates (Note: In fertility rates, 2.1 and above represents a stable or increasing population and have been marked blue, while 2.0 and below leads to an aging and, ultimately, declining population.)
1900	6,854,000	268,019	177,363	90,656	39.4	27.0	12.4		5.28
1901	6,929,800	260,439	166,662	93,777	37.6	25.0	12.6		5.22
1902	7,005,600	270,385	179,260	91,125	38.6	26.9	11.7		5.16
1903	7,081,400	258,209	179,518	78,691	36.5	26.1	10.4		5.10
1904	7,157,200	260,446	172,704	87,742	37.0	24.8	12.2		5.04
1905	7,233,000	252,501	203,516	48,985	35.5	27.8	7.7		4.98
1906	7,308,800	258,296	176,938	81,358	36.1	24.9	11.2		4.91
1907	7,384,600	261,231	180,216	81,015	36.2	25.6	10.6		4.85
1908	7,460,400	268,637	177,872	90,765	36.7	25.0	11.7		4.79
1909	7,536,200	271,177	184,445	86,732	37.1	25.4	11.7		4.73
1910	7,612,000	265,457	168,875	96,582	35.4	23.4	12.0		4.67
1911	7,640,000	261,375	184,009	77,366	34.8	24.8	10.0		4.59
1912	7,680,000	270,804	172,148	98,656	36.0	23.0	13.0		4.50
1913	7,710,000	264,418	174,241	90,177	34.3	23.2	11.1		4.42
1914	7,740,000	270,690	176,574	94,116	34.5	23.4	11.1		4.34
1915	7,770,000	187,734	189,418	−1,684	23.7	25.3	−1.6		4.26
1916	7,800,000	135,443	159,810	−24,367	16.8	20.9	−4.1		4.17
1917	7,830,000	130,817	163,507	−32,690	16.0	20.7	−4.7		4.09
1918	7,860,000	127,894	207,395	−79,501	15.3	25.7	−10.4		4.01
1919	7,900,000	217,431	157,392	60,039	27.6	20.0	7.6	8.6	3.93
1920	7,987,000	249,458	169,717	79,741	31.4	21.4	10.0	−5.9	3.84
1921	8,020,000	255,453	170,059	85,394	31.8	21.2	10.6	−3.1	3.81
1922	8,080,000	249,279	173,351	75,928	30.8	21.4	9.4	1.7	3.60
1923	8,170,000	238,971	159,287	79,684	29.2	19.5	9.8	−3.7	3.39
1924	8,220,000	221,462	167,668	53,794	26.9	20.4	6.5	3.2	3.18
1925	8,300,000	235,480	142,150	93,330	28.3	17.1	11.2	−2.8	3.36
1926	8,370,000	229,484	139,905	89,579	27.4	16.7	10.7	3.6	3.24
1927	8,454,000	218,548	150,675	67,873	25.8	17.8	8.0	−5.6	3.05
1928	8,510,000	224,693	146,496	78,197	26.4	17.2	9.2	−1.0	3.08
1929	8,580,000	215,463	152,847	62,976	25.1	17.8	7.3	4.9	2.92
1930	8,685,000	219,784	134,341	85,443	25.4	15.5	9.9	−4.7	2.84
1931	8,730,000	206,925	144,968	61,957	23.7	16.6	7.1	−1.0	2.84
1932	8,783,000	205,529	157,106	48,423	23.4	17.9	5.5	1.6	2.78
1933	8,845,000	193,911	129,913	63,998	21.9	14.7	7.2	0.7	2.72
1934	8,915,000	194,279	129,049	65,230	21.8	14.5	7.3	0	2.57
1935	8,980,000	189,479	136,923	52,556	21.1	15.2	5.9	0.8	2.55
1936	9,040,000	183,369	128,333	55,036	20.3	14.2	6.1	0.5	2.48
1937	9,100,000	182,449	128,049	54,400	20.0	14.1	6.0	0.5	2.42
1938	9,159,000	182,206	130,628	51,578	19.9	14.3	5.6	0.8	2.46
1939	9,217,000	178,633	124,591	54,042	19.4	13.5	5.9	0.9	2.50
1940	9,280,000	185,562	132,735	52,827	20.0	14.3	5.7	−1.8	2.48
1941	9,316,000	177,047	123,349	53,698	19.0	13.2	5.7	2.5	2.52
1942	9,392,000	187,187	136,844	50,343	19.9	14.6	5.4	−0.3	2.55
1943	9,440,000	173,295	127,158	46,137	18.4	13.5	4.9	−25.0	2.55
1944	9,497,000	190,000	144,048	45,952	20.5	15.6	5.0	−26.1	2.61
1945	9,055,000	169,091	211,323	−42,232	18.7	23.3	−4.7	3.3	2.64
1946	9,042,000	169,120	135,486	33,634	18.7	15.0	3.7	1.9	2.67
1947	9,093,000	187,316	117,537	69,779	20.6	12.9	7.7	−0.6	2.70
1948	9,158,000	191,907	105,780	86,127	21.0	11.6	9.4	−4.3	2.73
1949	9,205,000	190,398	105,718	84,680	20.6	11.4	9.2	0.4	2.76
1950	9,293,000	195,567	106,902	88,665	20.9	11.4	9.5	0.2	2.77
1951	9,383,000	190,645	109,998	80,647	20.2	11.7	8.6	-−.1	2.76
1952	9,463,000	185,820	107,443	78,377	19.6	11.3	8.2	0.5	2.72
1953	9,545,000	206,926	112,039	94,887	21.6	11.7	9.9	0.6	2.67
1954	9,645,000	223,347	106,670	116,677	23.0	11.0	12.0	0.6	2.61
1955	9,767,000	210,430	97,848	112,582	21.4	10.0	11.5	0.4	2.53
1956	9,883,000	192,810	104,236	88,574	19.5	10.5	8.9	−14.4	2.44
1957	9,829,000	167,202	103,645	63,557	17.0	10.5	6.5	−4.4	2.34
1958	9,850,000	158,428	97,866	60,562	16.0	9.9	6.1	0.3	2.23
1959	9,913,000	151,194	103,880	47,314	15.2	10.5	4.8	0	2.12
1960	9,961,000	146,461	101,525	44,936	14.7	10.2	4.5	0.1	2.02
1961	10,007,000	140,365	96,410	43,955	14.0	9.6	4.4	0.1	1.94
1962	10,052,000	130,053	108,273	21,780	12.9	10.8	2.2	0	1.79
1963	10,074,000	132,335	99,871	32,464	13.1	9.9	3.2	0.2	1.82
1964	10,108,000	132,141	100,830	31,311	13.1	10.0	3.1	0.1	1.81
1965	10,140,000	133,009	108,119	24,890	13.1	10.7	2.5	0.1	1.82
1966	10,166,000	138,489	101,943	36,546	13.6	10.0	3.6	0	1.89
1967	10,203,000	148,886	109,530	39,356	14.6	10.7	3.9	0.1	2.01
1968	10,244,000	154,419	115,354	39,065	15.1	11.2	3.8	0.1	2.06
1969	10,284,000	154,318	116,659	37,659	15.0	11.3	3.7	0	2.03
1970	10,322,000	151,819	120,197	31,622	14.7	11.6	3.1	−0.2	1.98
1971	10,352,000	150,640	123,009	27,631	14.5	11.9	2.7	−0.2	1.93
1972	10,378,000	153,265	118,991	34,274	14.7	11.4	3.3	−0.2	1.92
1973	10,410,000	156,224	123,366	32,858	15.0	11.8	3.1	0	1.93
1974	10,442,000	186,288	125,816	60,472	17.8	12.0	5.8	−0.1	2.27
1975	10,501,000	194,240	131,102	63,138	18.4	12.4	6.0	−0.1	2.34
1976	10,563,000	185,405	132,240	53,165	17.5	12.5	5.0	−0.1	2.23
1977	10,615,000	177,574	132,031	45,543	16.7	12.4	4.3	−0.1	2.15
1978	10,660,000	168,160	140,121	28,039	15.7	13.1	2.6	−0.1	2.06
1979	10,687,000	160,364	136,829	23,535	15.0	12.8	2.2	−0.1	2.00
1980	10,709,000	148,673	145,355	3,318	13.9	13.6	0.3	−0.7	1.91
1981	10,705,000	142,890	144,757	−1,867	13.3	13.5	0.2	−0.7	1.87
1982	10,695,000	133,559	144,318	−10,759	12.5	13.5	−1.0	−1.2	1.79
1983	10,671,000	127,258	148,643	−21,385	11.9	13.9	−2.0	−0.9	1.74
1984	10,640,000	125,359	146,709	−21,350	11.8	13.8	−2.0	−1.9	1.75
1985	10,599,000	130,200	147,614	−17,414	12.2	13.9	−1.6	−2.1	1.85
1986	10,560,000	128,204	147,089	−18,885	12.1	13.8	−1.8	−3.0	1.84
1987	10,509,000	125,840	142,601	−16,761	11.9	13.4	−1.6	−2.7	1.82
1988	10,464,000	124,296	140,042	−15,746	11.7	13.2	−1.5	−2.6	1.81
1989	10,421,000	123,304	144,695	−21,391	11.8	13.8	−2.0	−2.4	1.80
1990	10,375,000	125,679	145,660	−19,981	12.1	14.0	−1.9	1.7	1.87
1991	10,373,400	127,207	144,813	−17,606	12.3	14.0	−1.7	1.8	1.88
1992	10,374,000	121,724	148,781	−27,057	11.7	14.3	−2.6	1.7	1.78
1993	10,365,000	117,033	150,244	−33,211	11.3	14.5	−3.2	1.8	1.69
1994	10,350,000	115,598	146,889	−31,291	11.2	14.2	−3.0	1.7	1.64
1995	10,337,000	112,054	145,431	−33,377	10.8	14.1	−3.2	1.7	1.57
1996	10,321,000	105,272	143,130	−37,858	10.2	13.9	−3.7	1.8	1.46
1997	10,301,000	100,350	139,434	−39,084	9.8	13.5	−3.8	1.8	1.38
1998	10,280,000	97,301	140,870	−43,569	9.5	13.7	−4.2	1.6	1.32
1999	10,253,000	94,645	143,210	−48,565	9.2	14.0	−4.7	1.7	1.28
2000	10,222,000	97,597	135,601	−38,004	9.6	13.3	−3.7	1.5	1.32
2001	10,200,298	97,047	132,183	−35,136	9.5	13.0	−3.4	0.9	1.31
2002	10,174,853	96,804	132,833	−36,029	9.5	13.1	−3.5	0.3	1.30
2003	10,142,362	94,647	135,823	−41,176	9.3	13.4	−4.1	1.6	1.27
2004	10,116,742	95,137	132,492	−37,355	9.4	13.1	−3.7	1.8	1.27
2005	10,097,549	97,496	135,732	−38,236	9.7	13.5	−3.8	1.7	1.30
2006	10,076,581	99,871	131,603	−31,732	9.9	13.1	−3.2	2.1	1.34
2007	10,066,158	97,613	132,938	−35,325	9.7	13.2	−3.5	1.4	1.31
2008	10,045,401	99,149	130,027	−30,878	9.9	13.0	−3.1	1.7	1.35
2009	10,030,975	96,442	130,414	−33,972	9.6	13.0	−3.4	1.7	1.32
2010	10,014,324	90,335	130,456	−40,121	9.0	13.0	−4.0	1.2	1.25
2011	9,985,722	88,049	128,795	−40,746	8.8	12.9	−4.1	−1.3	1.23
2012	9,931,925	90,269	129,440	−39,171	9.1	13.0	−3.9	1.6	1.34
2013	9,895,250	88,689	126,778	−38,089	9.0	12.8	−3.9	0.7	1.34
2014	9,850,217	91,510	126,308	−34,798	9.3	12.8	−3.5	1.4	1.42
2015	9,815,858	91,690	131,697	−40,007	9.3	13.4	−4.1	1.5	1.45
2016	9,779,652	93,063	127,053	−33,990	9.5	12.9	−3.5	0.2	1.51
2017	9,739,857	91,577	131,674	−40,097	9.4	13.5	−4.1	2.1	1.51
2018	9,713,655	89,807	131,045	−41,238	9.2	13.4	−4.2	3.7	1.50
2019	9,700,272	89,193	129,603	−40,410	9.1	13.3	−4.1	3.8	1.51
2020	9,689,376	92,338	141,002	−48,664	9.5	14.5	−5.0	1.0	1.59
2021	9,651,461	93,039	155,621	−62,582	9.6	16.0	−6.4	2.1	1.61
2022	9,610,403	88,491	136,446	−47,955	9.1	14.1	−5.0	−4.5	1.55
2023	9,599,744	85,225	128,176	−42,951	8.9	13.3	−4.4	−1.8	1.51
2024	9,584,627	77,511	127,470	−49,959	8.1	13.3	−5.2	3.8	1.39
2025	9,539,502	72,017	124,193	−52,176	7.6	13.1	−5.5		1.31
2026	9,488,428								1.27*

=== Current vital statistics ===
Period	Live births	Deaths	Natural decrease
January–September 2025	54,351	92,490	−38,139
January–September 2026	52,429	90,614	–38,185
Difference	▼ −1,922 (-3.5%)	▼ −1,876 (-2.0%)	▼ -46

=== Structure of the population ===
Population Estimates by Sex and Age Group (01.01.2021) (Data refer to usual resident population.):

Age group	Male	Female	Total	%
Total	4 663 794	5 066 978	9 730 772	100
0–4	241 553	228 350	469 903	4.83
5–9	235 461	222 548	458 009	4.71
10–14	250 542	238 779	489 321	5.03
15–19	250 935	236 815	487 750	5.01
20–24	269 584	252 965	522 549	5.37
25–29	321 164	300 576	621 740	6.39
30–34	321 542	300 563	622 105	6.39
35–39	322 953	310 447	633 400	6.51
40–44	404 753	394 017	798 770	8.21
45–49	396 980	389 352	786 332	8.08
50–54	340 428	344 513	684 941	7.04
55–59	271 871	294 030	565 901	5.82
60–64	279 106	334 279	613 385	6.30
65–69	283 306	374 078	657 384	6.76
70–74	203 869	299 041	502 910	5.17
75–79	137 540	234 575	372 115	3.82
80–84	77 655	166 734	244 389	2.51
85–89	37 559	94 389	131 948	1.36
90–94	12 938	38 093	51 031	0.52
95–99	3 096	10 430	13 526	0.14
100–104	725	1 958	2 683	0.03
105–109	201	414	615	0.01
110+	33	32	65	<0.01
Age group	Male	Female	Total	Percent
0–14	727 556	689 677	1 417 233	14.56
15–64	3 179 316	3 157 557	6 336 873	65.12
65+	756 922	1 219 744	1 976 666	20.31

=== Vital statistics by county ===
There are large variations in the birth rates as of 2016: Zala County has the lowest birth rate with 7.5 births per thousand inhabitants, while Szabolcs-Szatmár-Bereg County has the highest birth rate with 11.2 births per thousand inhabitants.

The death rates also differ greatly from as low as 11.3 deaths per thousand inhabitants in Pest County to as high as 15.7 deaths per thousand inhabitants in Békés County.

Vital statistics as of 2016
County	Birth rate (‰)	Death rate (‰)	Natural increase
Baranya	8.0	13.6	−5.6
Bács-Kiskun	9.3	13.6	−4.3
Békés	8.2	15.7	−7.5
Borsod-Abaúj-Zemplén	11.0	14.2	−3.2
Budapest	9.2	12.0	−2.9
Csongrád	8.4	12.9	−4.5
Fejér	9.4	12.5	−3.1
Győr-Moson-Sopron	8.9	11.4	−2.4
Hajdú-Bihar	10.3	11.6	−1.3
Heves	9.4	14.5	−5.1
Jász-Nagykun-Szolnok	9.9	14.8	−4.8
Komárom-Esztergom	9.7	13.4	−3.7
Nógrád	9.1	15.1	−6.0
Pest	9.8	11.3	−1.5
Somogy	8.8	14.3	−5.5
Szabolcs-Szatmár-Bereg	11.2	12.2	−0.9
Tolna	9.0	13.7	−4.7
Vas	8.3	13.5	−5.2
Veszprém	8.7	13.5	−4.8
Zala	7.9	14.0	−6.1

== Ethnic groups and language ==
County	Hungarian	Bulgarian	Romani	Greek	Croat	Polish	German	Armenian	Romanian	Rusyn	Serbian	Slovak	Slovenian	Ukrainian
All	91.7%	0.1%	3.4%	0.1%	0.3%	0.1%	2.0%	0.0%	0.4%	0.0%	0.1%	0.4%	0.0%	0.1%
Budapest	95.5%	0.1%	1.2%	0.1%	0.1%	0.2%	1.7%	0.1%	0.5%	0.0%	0.1%	0.2%	0.0%	0.1%
Bács-Kiskun	93.7%	0.0%	2.2%	0.0%	0.7%	0.0%	2.4%	0.0%	0.3%	0.0%	0.2%	0.4%	0.0%	0.0%
Baranya	86.3%	0.1%	4.6%	0.0%	1.9%	0.1%	6.7%	0.0%	0.2%	0.0%	0.2%	0.0%	0.0%	0.0%
Békés	91.9%	0.0%	2.7%	0.0%	0.0%	0.0%	0.9%	0.0%	1.7%	0.0%	0.1%	2.5%	0.0%	0.0%
Borsod-Abaúj-Zemplén	90.0%	0.0%	8.5%	0.0%	0.0%	0.1%	0.6%	0.0%	0.1%	0.2%	0.0%	0.3%	0.0%	0.1%
Csongrád	96.8%	0.0%	1.2%	0.0%	0.1%	0.0%	0.6%	0.0%	0.5%	0.0%	0.5%	0.2%	0.0%	0.0%
Fejér	96.0%	0.0%	1.5%	0.1%	0.1%	0.1%	1.7%	0.0%	0.2%	0.0%	0.1%	0.1%	0.0%	0.1%
Győr-Moson-Sopron	95.0%	0.1%	0.8%	0.0%	0.7%	0.0%	2.7%	0.0%	0.2%	0.0%	0.0%	0.4%	0.0%	0.0%
Hajdú-Bihar	95.4%	0.1%	3.4%	0.0%	0.0%	0.0%	0.4%	0.0%	0.5%	0.0%	0.0%	0.0%	0.0%	0.1%
Heves	92.6%	0.0%	6.3%	0.0%	0.0%	0.0%	0.5%	0.0%	0.2%	0.0%	0.0%	0.2%	0.0%	0.1%
Jász-Nagykun-Szolnok	94.2%	0.0%	4.9%	0.0%	0.0%	0.0%	0.4%	0.0%	0.2%	0.0%	0.0%	0.0%	0.0%	0.0%
Komárom-Esztergom	93.2%	0.1%	1.4%	0.0%	0.0%	0.1%	3.6%	0.0%	0.3%	0.0%	0.0%	1.2%	0.0%	0.1%
Nógrád	90.0%	0.0%	7.7%	0.0%	0.0%	0.0%	0.7%	0.0%	0.1%	0.0%	0.0%	1.4%	0.0%	0.0%
Pest	94.2%	0.1%	1.7%	0.0%	0.1%	0.1%	2.5%	0.0%	0.5%	0.0%	0.1%	0.6%	0.0%	0.1%
Somogy	92.1%	0.0%	5.3%	0.0%	0.5%	0.0%	1.7%	0.0%	0.1%	0.0%	0.0%	0.0%	0.0%	0.0%
Szabolcs-Szatmár-Bereg	90.8%	0.0%	8.0%	0.0%	0.0%	0.0%	0.5%	0.0%	0.2%	0.1%	0.0%	0.1%	0.0%	0.3%
Tolna	90.3%	0.0%	3.9%	0.0%	0.1%	0.0%	5.2%	0.0%	0.2%	0.0%	0.1%	0.1%	0.0%	0.0%
Vas	94.5%	0.0%	1.0%	0.0%	1.2%	0.0%	2.1%	0.0%	0.1%	0.0%	0.0%	0.0%	0.7%	0.0%
Veszprém	94.8%	0.0%	1.5%	0.0%	0.0%	0.1%	3.2%	0.0%	0.2%	0.0%	0.0%	0.1%	0.0%	0.1%
Zala	94.1%	0.0%	2.6%	0.0%	1.3%	0.0%	1.6%	0.0%	0.1%	0.0%	0.0%	0.0%	0.0%	0.0%

=== History and census numbers ===
Hungary before the Treaty of Trianon (4 June 1920)

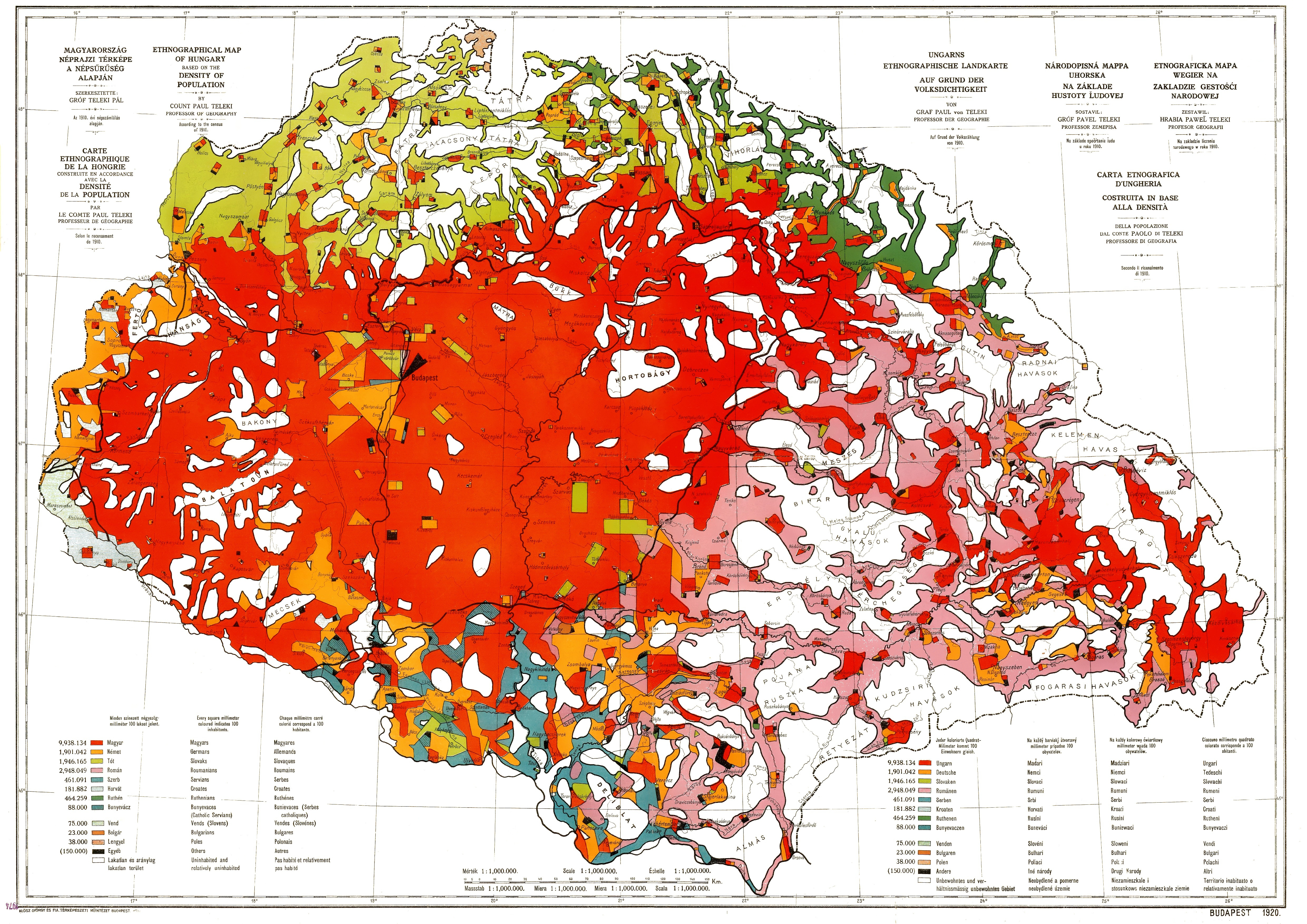
The Red Map. Ethnic map of the Hungary proper publicized by the Hungarian delegation. Regions with population density below 20 persons/km^{2} are left blank and the corresponding population is represented in the nearest region with population density above that limit. The vibrant, dominant red color was deliberately chosen to mark Hungarians while the light purple color of the Romanians, who were already the majority in the whole of Transylvania back then, is shadow-like. Hungarians Germans Slovaks Rusyns Romanians Serbs Croats Spaces with a smaller density than 20 persons/sq km

Hungary lost 64% of its total population in consequence of the Treaty of Trianon, decreasing from 20.9 million to 7.6 million, and 31% (3.3 out of 10.7 million) of its ethnic Hungarians, Hungary lost five of its ten most populous cities.

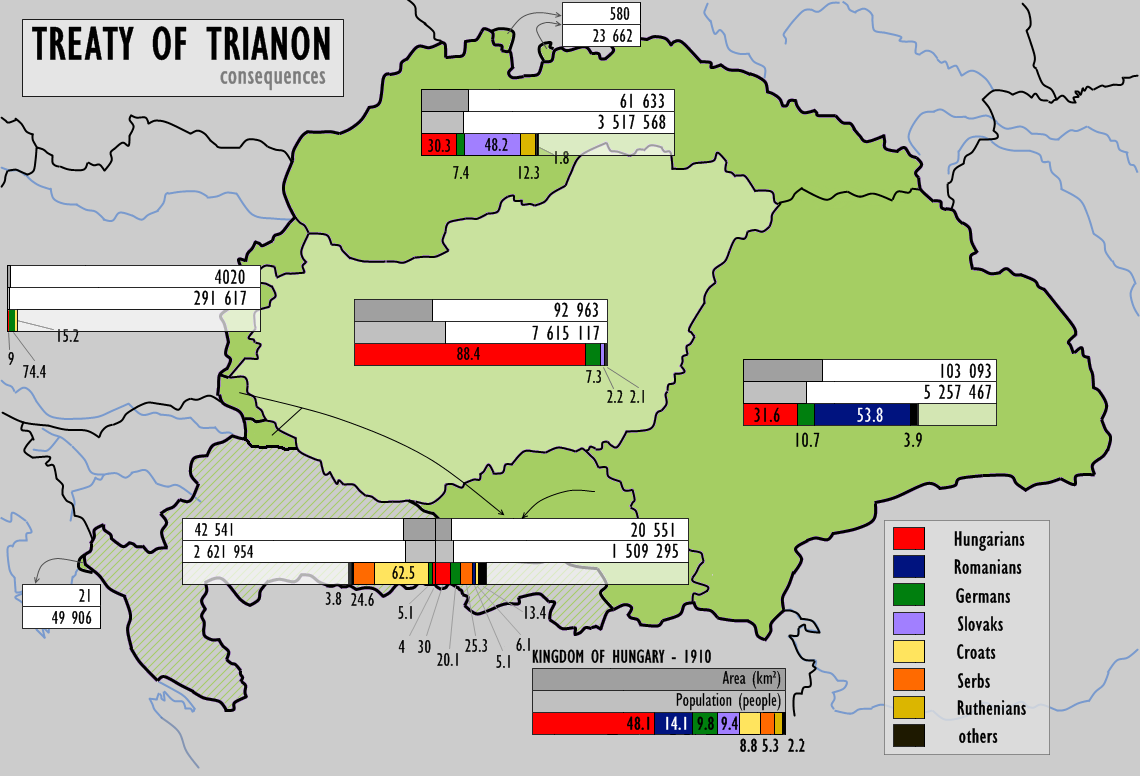
Hungary lost 72% of its territory, its sea access, half of its 10 biggest cities and all of its precious metal mines; 3,425,000 ethnic Hungarians found themselves separated from their motherland. Based on the 1910 census. Administrative Hungary in green, autonomous Croatia-Slavonia grey.

According to the census of 1910, the largest ethnic group in the Kingdom of Hungary were Hungarians, who were 54.5% of the population of Kingdom of Hungary, excluding Croatia-Slavonia. Although the territories of the former Kingdom of Hungary that were assigned by the treaty to neighbouring states in total had a majority of non-Hungarian population, they also included areas of Hungarian majority and significant Hungarian minorities, numbering 3,318,000 in total.

The number of Hungarians in the different areas based on census data of 1910. The present day location of each area is given in parentheses.

- In Upper Hungary (mostly Slovakia): 885,000 – 30%
- In Transylvania (Romania): 1,658,045 – 31.6%
- In Vojvodina (Serbia): 425,672 – 28.1%
- In Transcarpathia (Ukraine): 183,000 – 30%
- In Croatia: 121,000 – 3.5%
- In Prekmurje (Slovenia): 14,065 – 15%
- In Burgenland (Austria): 26,200 – 9%

Non-Hungarian population in the Kingdom of Hungary, based on 1910 census data

Romanians, Slovaks, Ruthenians, Serbs, Croats and Germans, who represented the majority of the populations of the above-mentioned territories:

- In Upper Hungary (mostly Slovakia): 1,687,977 Slovaks and 1,233,454 others (mostly Hungarians – 886,044, Germans, Ruthenians and Roma). However, according to the Czechoslovak census in 1921, there were 2,025,003 (67,5%) Slovaks, 650,597 (21,7%) Hungarians, 145,844 (4,9%) Germans, 88,970 (3,0%) Ruthenians and 90,456 (3,0%) others including Jews.
- In Carpathian Ruthenia (Ukraine): 330,010 Ruthenians and 275,932 others (mostly Hungarians, Germans, Romanians, and Slovaks)
- In Transylvania (Romania): 2,831,222 Romanians (53.8%) and 2,431,273 others (mostly Hungarians – 1,662,948 (31.6%) and Germans – 563,087 (10.7%). The 1919 and 1920 Transylvanian censuses indicate a greater percentage of Romanians (57.1%/57.3%) and a smaller Hungarian minority (26.5%/25.5%)
- In Vojvodina and Croatia-Slavonia (Serbia, Croatia): 2,756,000 Croats and Serbs and 1,366,000 others (mostly Hungarians and Germans)
- In Prekmurje (Slovenia): 74,199 Slovenes (80%), 14,065 Hungarians (15,2%), 2,540 Germans (2,7%)
- In Burgenland (Austria): 217,072 Germans and 69,858 others (mainly Croatian and Hungarian)

Post-Trianon Hungary

Population in the territory of present-day Hungary according to ethnic group 1495–1930
Ethnic group	estimation 1495		1715		1785		census 1880		census 1900		census 1910		census 1920		census 1930	
Ethnic group	Number	%	Number	%	Number	%	Number	%	Number	%	Number	%	Number	%	Number	%
Hungarians	990,000	95.6%	1,176,000	79.1%	2,103,000	79.0%	4,402,364	82.4%	5,890,999	85.9%	6,730,299	88.4%	7,155,973	89.6%	8,000,335	92.1%
Germans	17,000	1.6%	136,600	9.2%	291,900	11.0%	606,363	11.3%	604,751	8.8%	553,179	7.3%	550,062	6.9%	477,153	5.5%
Slovaks	n.d	n.d.	37,700	2.5%	130,400	4.9%	199,788	3.7%	192,227	2.8%	165,317	2.2%	141,877	1.8%	104,786	1.2%
Croats	1,200	0.1%	58,900	4.0%	71,700	2.7%	59,251	1.1%	68,161	1.0%	62,018	0.8%	58,931	0.7%	47,337	0.5%
Others	23,800	2.4%	70,800	4.8%	66,214	2.4%	75,598	1.5%	98,277	1.5%	101,301	1.3%	80,026	1.0%	55,503	0.6%
Total	1,032,000		1,480,000		2,663,214		5,343,364		6,854,415		7,612,114		7,986,875		8,685,109	

According to the 1920 census 10.4% of the population spoke one of the minority languages as mother language:

- 551,212 German (6.9%)
- 141,882 Slovak (1.8%)
- 23,760 Romanian (0.3%)
- 36,858 Croatian (0.5%)
- 23,228 Bunjevac and Šokci (0.3%)
- 17,131 Serb (0.2%)
- 7,000 Slovenes (0,08%)

The number of bilingual people was much higher, for example 1,398,729 people spoke German (17%), 399,176 people spoke Slovak (5%), 179,928 people spoke Croatian (2.2%) and 88,828 people spoke Romanian (1.1%). Hungarian was spoken by 96% of the total population and was the mother language of 89%. The percentage and the absolute number of all non-Hungarian nationalities decreased in the next decades, although the total population of the country increased.

Note: 300.000 Hungarian refugees fled to Hungary from the territory of successor states (Romania, Czechoslovakia and Yugoslavia) after the WW I.

From 1938 to 1945

Ethnic map of Hungary in 1910, with 1941 borders superimposed.

Ethnic map of Northern Transylvania

Hungary expanded its borders with territories from Czechoslovakia, Romania and Yugoslavia following the First Vienna Award (1938) and Second Vienna Award (1940). The remainder of Carpathian Ruthenia and parts of Yugoslavia were occupied and annexed in 1939 and 1941, respectively. Regarding Northern Transylvania, the Romanian census from 1930 counted 38% Hungarians and 49% Romanians, while the Hungarian census from 1941 counted 53.5% Hungarians and 39.1% Romanians. The territory of Bácska had 789,705 inhabitants, and 45,4% or 47,2% declared themselves to be Hungarian native speakers or ethnic Hungarians. The percentage of Hungarian speakers was 84% in southern Czechoslovakia and 25% in the Sub-Carpathian Rus.

Population of Hungary in 1941
Ethnic group	census 1941	
Ethnic group	Number	%
Hungarians	11,881,455	80.9%
Romanians	1,051,026	7.2%
Ruthenians	547,770	3.7%
Germans	533,045	3.6%
Serbs	213,585	1.5%
Slovaks	175,550	1.2%
Jewish (Note: Except in the year 1941, Jewish people were not recognized as a minority, but only as a religion — assuredly, many Jews considered themselves as belonging to one of the recognized minorities.)	139,041	0.9%
Roma	76,209	0.5%
Croats	12,346	0.1%
Slovenes	9,400	0.1%
Others	29,210	0.2%
Total	14,679,573	

After WW II: 1949–1990

After World War II, about 200,000 Germans were deported to Germany according to the decree of the Potsdam Conference. Under the forced exchange of population between Czechoslovakia and Hungary, approximately 73,000 Slovaks left Hungary. After these population movements Hungary became an ethnically almost homogeneous country except the rapidly growing number of Romani people in the second half of the 20th century.

Population of Hungary 1949–1990
Ethnic group	census 1949		census 1960		census 1970		census 1980		census 1990	
Ethnic group	Number	%	Number	%	Number	%	Number	%	Number	%
Hungarians	9,076,041	98.6%	9,786,038	98.2%	10,166,237	98.5%	10,638,974	99.3%	10,142,072	97.8%
Roma	21,387	0.2%	25,633	0.3%	34,957	0.3%	6,404	0.1%	142,683	1.4%
Germans	22,455	0.2%	50,765	0.5%	35,594	0.4%	11,310	0.1%	30,824	0.3%
Slovaks	25,988	0.3%	30,630	0.3%	21,176	0.2%	9,101	0.1%	10,459	0.1%
Croats	20,423	0.2%	33,014	0.3%	17,609	0.2%	13,895	0.1%	13,570	0.1%
Romanians	14,713	0.2%	15,787	0.2%	12,624	0.1%	8,874	0.1%	10,740	0.1%
Serbs	5,158	0.1%	4,583	0.1%	12,235	0.1%	2,805	0.0%	2,905	0.0%
Slovenes	4,473	0.1%	–		4,205	0.0%	1,731	0.0%	1,930	0.0%
Others	14,161	0.1%	14,534	0.1%	17,462	0.2%	16,369	0.2%	19,640	0.2%
Total	9,204,799		9,961,044		10,322,099		10,709,463		10,374,823	

For historical reasons, significant Hungarian minority populations can be found in the surrounding countries, notably in Ukraine (in Transcarpathia), Slovakia, Romania (in Transylvania), and Serbia (in Vojvodina). Austria (in Burgenland), Croatia, and Slovenia (Prekmurje) are also host to a number of ethnic Hungarians.

2001–2022

Population of Hungary 2001–2022
Ethnic group	census 2001		census 2011		census 2022	
Ethnic group	Number	%	Number	%	Number	%
Hungarians	9,416,045	92.3%	8,504,492	85.6%	8,438,129	87.9%
Roma	189,984	2.0%	315,583	3.2%	209,909	2.2%
Germans	62,105	0.6%	185,696	1.9%	142,551	1.5%
Romanians	7,995	0.1%	35,641	0.4%	27,554	0.3%
Slovaks	17,693	0.2%	35,208	0.4%	29,881	0.3%
Croats	15,597	0.2%	26,774	0.3%	21,824	0.2%
Serbs	3,816	0.0%	10,038	0.1%	11,622	0.1%
Slovenes	3,025	0.0%	2,820	0.0%	3,965	0.0%
Others	57,059	0.6%	73,399	0.9%	55,610	0.6%
Not stated	570,537	5.6%	1,398,731	14.1%	1,086,239	11.3%
Total	10,198,315		9,937,628		9,603,634	

- Note: In 2001 570,537, in 2011 1,398,731 people did not give answer for ethnicity. Moreover, people were able to give more than one answer on the question asking for the minorities (for example, people were allowed to write Hungarian as their first ethnic identity and German as an ethnic identity being influenced by), hence the sum of the above exceeds the number of population.
- Methodology had changed in 2001 and 2011 also.
- Roma people is estimated to be around 8.8% Roma

=== Historical ethnic groups of Hungary ===
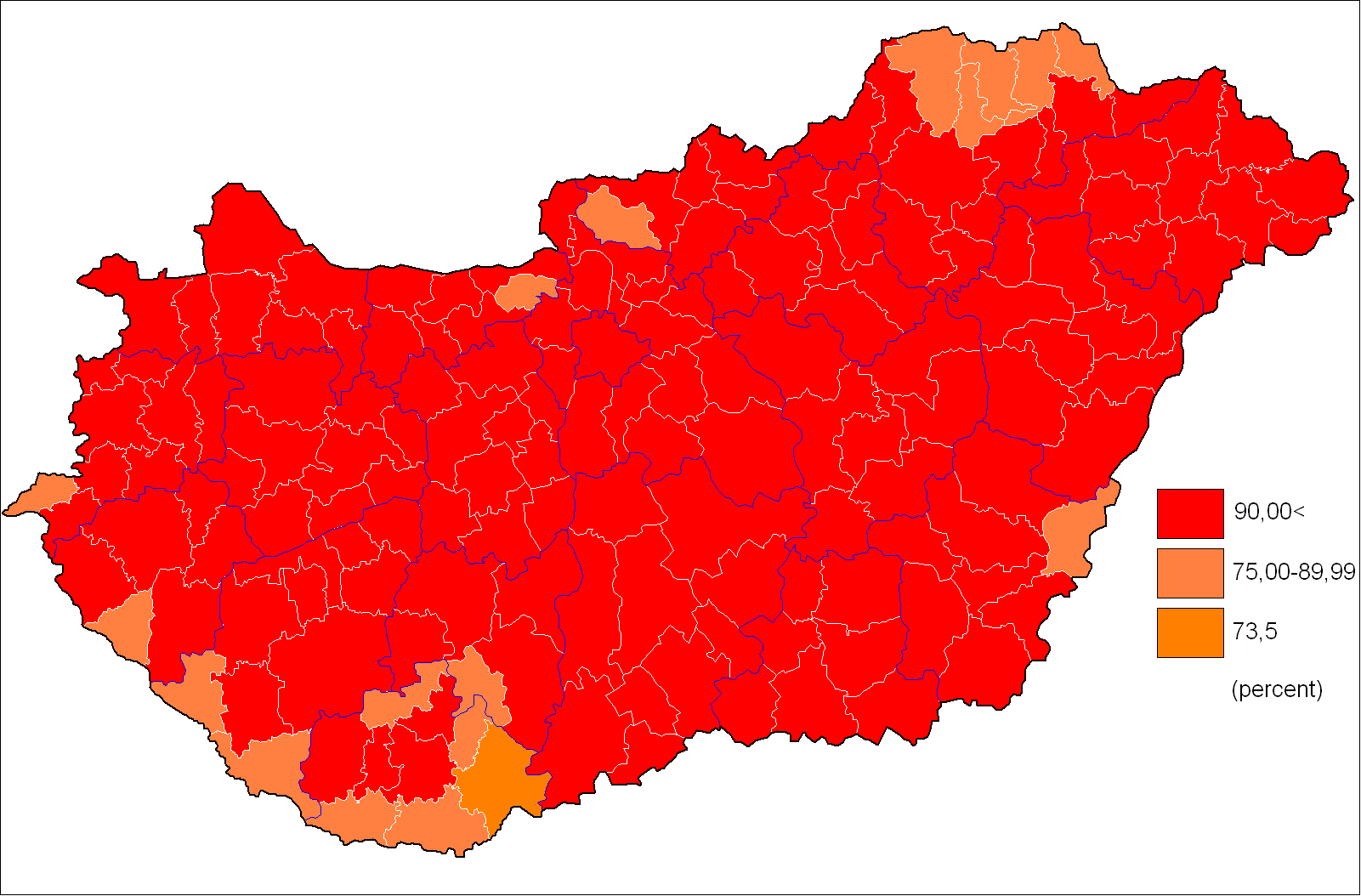
Hungarians in Hungary (2001)

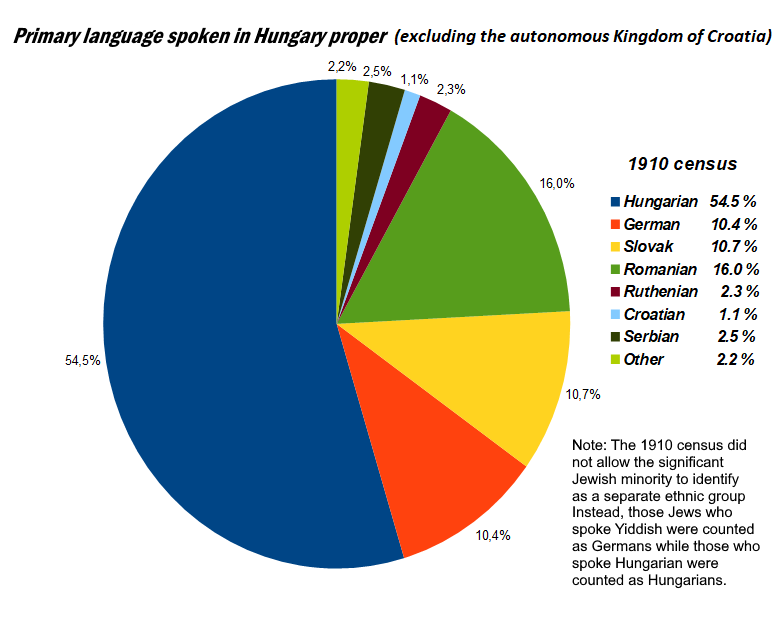
Minorities of Hungary

When the Hungarians invaded the Carpathian Basin, it was inhabited by Slavic and Avar peoples. Written sources from the 9th century also suggest that some groups of Onogurs and Bulgars occupied the valley of the river Mureș at the time of the Magyars’ invasion. There is a dispute as to whether Romanian population existed in Transylvania during that time.

The Roma minority

The first Romani groups arrived in Hungary in the fifteenth century from Turkey. Nowadays, the real number of Roma in Hungary is a disputed question.

In the 2001 census only 190 046 (2%) called themselves Roma, but experts and Roma organisations estimate that there are between 450,000 and 1,000,000 Roma living in Hungary. Since then, the size of the Roma population has increased rapidly. Today every fifth or sixth newborn child belongs to the Roma minority. Based on current demographic trends, a 2006 estimate by Central European Management Intelligence claims that the proportion of the Roma population will double by 2050, putting the percentage of its Roma community at around 14–15% of the country's population.

There are problems related to the Roma minority in Hungary, and the very subject is a heated and disputed topic.

Objective problems:

- Slightly more than 80% of Roma children complete primary education, but only one third continue studies into the intermediate (secondary) level. This is far lower than the more than 90% proportion of children of non-Roma families who continue studies at an intermediate level. Less than 1% of Roma hold higher educational certificates.
- Poverty: most of the Roma people live in significantly worse conditions than others.
- Bad health conditions: life expectancy is about 10 years less compared to non-Romas
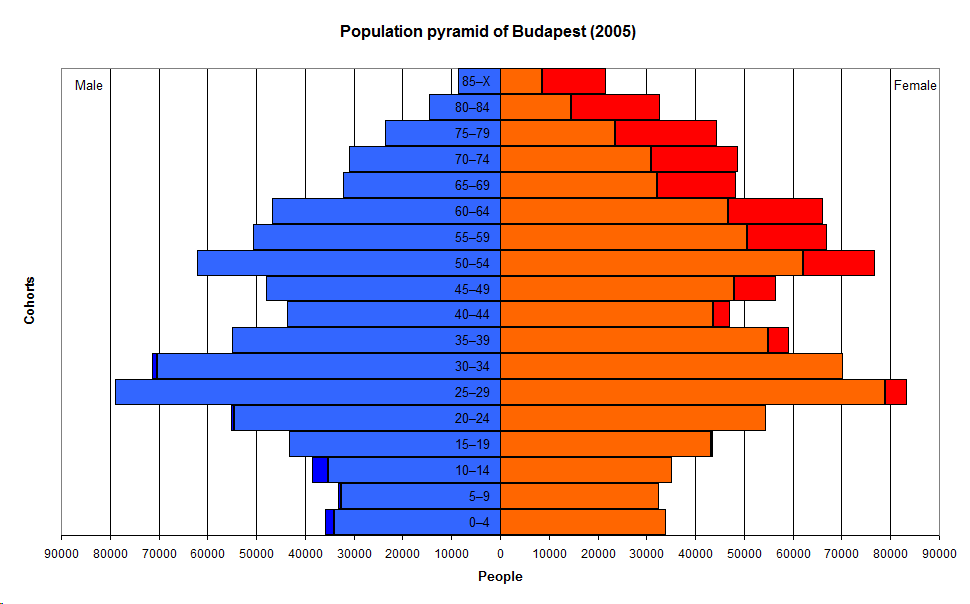
Population pyramid of Budapest (99.2% non-Romany inhabitants), see: Demographics of Budapest

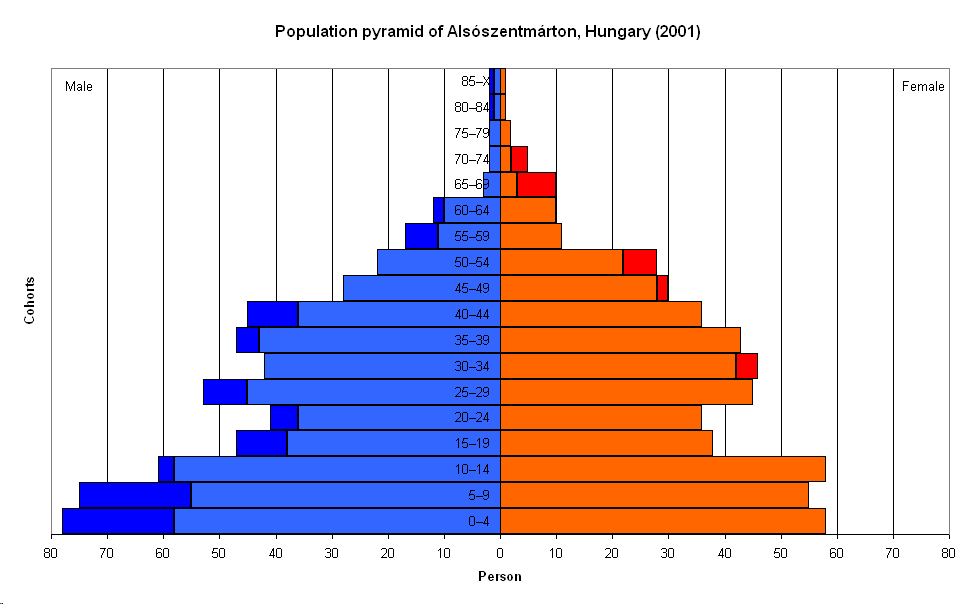
Population pyramid of Alsószentmárton (100% Romany inhabitants)

Kabars

Three Kabar tribes joined to the Hungarians and participated in the Hungarian conquest of Hungary. They settled mostly in Bihar county.

Böszörménys

The Muslim Böszörménys migrated to the Carpathian Basin in the course of the 10th–12th centuries and they were composed of various ethnic groups. Most of them must have arrived from Volga Bulgaria and Khwarezm.

Pechenegs

Communities of Pechenegs (Besenyő in Hungarian) lived in the Kingdom of Hungary from the 11-12th centuries. They were most numerous in the county of Tolna.

Oghuz Turks (Ouzes)

Smaller groups of Oghuz Turk settlers ('Úzok' or 'Fekete Kunok/Black Cumans' in Hungarian) came to the Carphatian Basin from the middle of the 11th century. They were settled mostly in Barcaság. The city of Ózd got its name after them.

Jassics

The Jassic (Jász in Hungarian) people were a nomadic tribe which settled – with the Cumans – in the Kingdom of Hungary during the 13th century. Their name is almost certainly related to that of the Iazyges. Béla IV, king of Hungary granted them asylum and they became a privileged community with the right of self-government. During the centuries they were fully assimilated to the Hungarian population, their language disappeared, but they preserved their Jassic identity and their regional autonomy until 1876. Over a dozen settlements in Central Hungary (e.g. Jászberény, Jászárokszállás, Jászfényszaru) still bear their name.

Cumans

During the Russian campaign, the Mongols drove some 200,000 Cumans, a nomadic tribe who had opposed them, west of the Carpathian Mountains. There, the Cumans appealed to King Béla IV of Hungary for protection. In the Kingdom of Hungary, Cumans created two regions named Cumania (Kunság in Hungarian): Greater Cumania (Nagykunság) and Little Cumania (Kiskunság), both located the Great Hungarian Plain. Here, the Cumans maintained their autonomy, language and some ethnic customs well into the modern era. According to Pálóczi's estimation originally 70–80,000 Cumans settled in Hungary.

Romanians

The oldest extant documents from Transylvania make reference to Vlachs too. Regardless of the subject of Romanian presence/non-presence in Transylvania prior to the Hungarian conquest, the first chronicles to write of Vlachs in the intra-Carpathian regions is the Gesta Hungarorum, while the first written Hungarian sources about Romanian settlements derive from the 13th century, record was written about Olahteluk village in Bihar County from 1283. The 'land of Romanians', Terram Blacorum (1222, 1280) showed up in Fogaras and this area was mentioned under different name (Olachi) in 1285. The first appearance of a probably Romanian name 'Ola' in Hungary derives from a charter (1258).

They were a significant population in Transylvania, Banat, Maramureș and Partium (Crișana). There are different estimations in connection with number of Romanians in Kingdom of Hungary. According to a research based on place-names made by István Kniezsa, 511 villages of Transylvania and Banat appear in documents at the end of the 13th century, however only 3 of them bore Romanian names, and around 1400 AD, Transylvania and Banat consisted of 1757 villages, though only 76 (4.3%) of them had names of Romanian origin. The number of Romanians started to increase significantly from the Early modern period, and by 1700 the Romanian ethnic group consisted of 40 percent of the Transylvanian population and their number raised even more in the 18th century. Although, in 1574, Pierre Lescalopier, relating his voyage from Venice to Constantinople, claimed that most of the inhabitants of Transylvania were Romanians and according to other estimates, the Romanian inhabitants who were primarily peasants, consisted of more than 60 percent of the population in 1600. Jean W. Sedlar estimates that Vlachs (Romanians) constituted about two-thirds of Transylvania's population in 1241 on the eve of the Mongol invasion, however according to Károly Kocsis and Eszter Kocsisné Hodosi the Hungarian ethnic group in Transylvania was in decent majority before Battle of Mohács and only lost its relative majority by the 17th century. Nevertheless, Grigore Ureche in Letopisețul Țării Moldovei (1642–1647) noticed that in Transylvania Romanians were more numerous than Hungarians. Official censuses with information on Hungary's ethnic composition have been conducted since the 19th century.

In 1881, Romanian-majority settlements projected to the present-day territory of Hungary were: Bedő, Csengerújfalu, Kétegyháza, Körösszakál, Magyarcsanád, Méhkerék, Mezőpeterd, Pusztaottlaka and Vekerd. Important communities lived in the villages of Battonya, Elek, Körösszegapáti, Létavértes, Nyíradony, Pocsaj, Sarkadkeresztúr, Zsáka and in the town of Gyula.

Slovaks

The Slovak people lived mainly in Upper Hungary, northern parts of the Kingdom of Hungary. Due to post-Ottoman resettlements, the regions of Vojvodina, Banat and Békés county received bigger Slovak communities in the 18th century, which revitalized many deserted villages and towns, such as Békéscsaba, where Slovaks became the biggest ethnic group, or Nyíregyháza, where they comprised more than a third of the population in 1881. After WWII a major population exchange with Czechoslovakia was carried out: 71,787 or 73,200 Slovaks from Hungary were transferred to Slovakia – the exact number depends on source consulted – were resettled in South Slovakia in exchange for, according to different estimations, 45,000 or 120,000 Hungarians.

Serbs

From the 14th century, escaping from the Ottoman threat, a large number of Serbs migrated to the Hungarian Kingdom. After the Battle of Mohács, most of the territory of Hungary got into Ottoman rule. In that time, especially in the 17th century, many Serb, and other South Slavic immigrants settled in Hungary. Most of the Ottoman soldiers in the territory of present-day Hungary were South Slavs (the Janissary). After the Turkish withdrawal, Kingdom of Hungary came under Habsburg rule, a new wave of Serb refugees migrated to the area around 1690, as a consequence of the Habsburg-Ottoman war. In the first half of the 18th century, Serbs and South Slavs were ethnic majority in several cities in Hungary.

Germans

Three waves of German migration can be distinguished in Hungary before the 20th century. The first two waves settled in Upper Hungary and in southern Transylvania (Transylvanian Saxons), with the first being in the 11th century and the second in the 13th century.

The third, largest wave of German-speaking immigrants into Hungary occurred after the withdrawal of the Ottoman Empire from Hungarian territory, after the Treaty of Karlowitz. Between 1711 and 1780, German-speaking settlers immigrated to the regions of southern Hungary, mostly regions of Bánát, Bács-Bodrog, Baranya and Tolna counties (as well as into present-day Romania and Serbia), which had been depopulated by the Ottoman wars. At the end of the 18th century, the Kingdom of Hungary contained over one million German-speaking residents (collectively known as Danube Swabians). In 2011, 131,951 people declared to be German in Hungary (1,6%).

Rusyns

Rusyns had lived mostly in Carpathian Ruthenia, Northeast Hungary, however significant Rusyn population appeared in Vojvodina from the 18th century.

Croats

Croatia was in personal union with Hungary from 1102. Croat communities were spread mostly in the western and southern part of the country and along the Danube, including Budapest.

Poles

The Poles lived at the northern borders of Kingdom of Hungary from the arrival of the Hungarians.

Slovenes

The Slovenes (Vendek in Hungarian) lived in the western part of the Carpathian basin before the Hungarian conquest. In the 11th and 12th century, the current linguistic and ethnic border between the Hungarian and Slovene people was established. Nowadays, they live in Vendvidék (Slovenska krajina in Slovenians) between the Mura and the Rába rivers. In 2001, there were around 5,000 Slovenes in Hungary.

Jews

The first historical document about Jews of Hungary is the letter written about 960 to King Joseph of the Khazars by Hasdai ibn Shaprut, the Jewish statesman of Córdoba, in which he says Jews living in "the country of Hungarin". There are Jewish inscriptions on tombs and monuments in Pannonia (Roman Hungary) dated to the second or third century CE.

Armenians

The first Armenians came to Hungary from the Balkans in the 10–11th century.

Greeks

Greeks migrated to Kingdom of Hungary from the 15th and 16th centuries. Mass migrations did not occur until the 17th century, the largest waves being in 1718 and 1760–1770; they were primarily connected to the economic conditions of the period. It is estimated that 10,000 Greeks emigrated to Hungary in the second half of the 18th century. A number of Greeks Communists escaped to Hungary after the Greek Civil War, notably in the 'Greek' village of Beloiannisz.

Bulgarians

The town of Szentendre and the surrounding villages were inhabited by Bulgarians since the Middle Ages. However, present day Bulgarians are largely descended from gardeners who migrated to Hungary from the 18th century.

== Religion ==
Religious affiliation in Hungary (2022)
Denominations	Population	% of total
Catholicism	2,886,619	30
Roman Catholics	2,643,855	28.3
Greek Catholics	165,135	1.7
Protestantism	1,120,485	11.6
Calvinists	943,982	9.8
Lutherans	176,503	1.8
Orthodox Christianity	15,578	0.2
Judaism	7,635	0.1
Other religions	171,174	1.8
Total religions	4,201,491	43.7
No religion	1,549,610	16.2
Did not wish to answer	3,852,533	40.1
total	9,603,634	100.00

The majority of Hungarians became Christian in the 11th century. Hungary remained predominantly Catholic until the 16th century, when the Reformation led to the first Lutherans, and later Calvinists, which were embraced by nearly the entire Hungarian population at the time.

In the second half of the 16th century, Jesuits led a successful campaign of counterreformation among the Hungarians, although Protestantism survived as the faith of a significant minority, especially in the far east and northeast of the country. Orthodox Christianity in Hungary has been the religion mainly of some national minorities in the country, notably Romanians, Rusyns, Ukrainians, and Serbs.

Faith Church, one of Europe's largest Pentecostal churches, is also located in Hungary. Hungary has historically been home to a significant Jewish community. Jews rose from around 2% at the start of the nineteenth century to around 5% at the turn of the 20th century, growing in population size by 1,021% between 1787–1910.

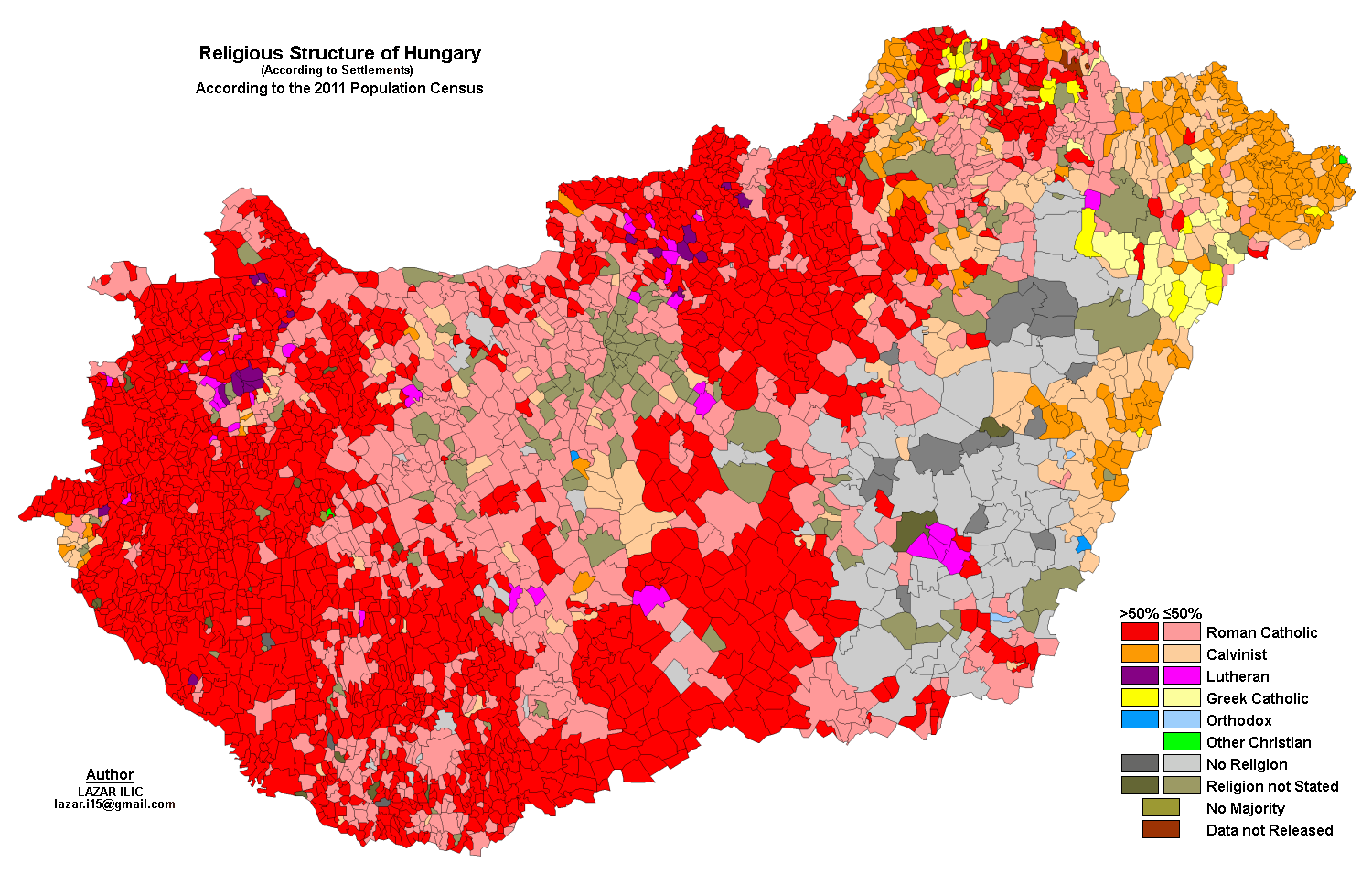
Distribution of religions in Hungary

According to 2011 census data, Christianity is the largest religion in Hungary, with around 5.2 million adherents (52.9%), while the largest denomination in Hungary is the Catholic Church (38.9% — Latin Church 37.1%; Hungarian Greek Catholic Church 1.8%). There is a significant Calvinist minority (11.6% of the population) and smaller Lutheran (2.2%), Orthodox (0.1%) and Jewish (0.1%) minorities. However, these census figures are representative of religious affiliation rather than attendance; around 12% of Hungarians attend religious services more than least once a week and around 50% more than once a year, while 30% of Hungarians do not believe in God at all. The census showed a large drop of religious adherents who wish to answer, from 74.6% to 54.7% in ten years' time, replacing them by people either who do not wish to answer or people who are not following a religion.

== Immigration ==
=== Hungary migration data, 2001–present ===
Year	Foreign Immigrants	Foreign Emigrants	Net Migration (Foreigners)	Hungarian Returning Citizens	Hungarian Emigrants	Net Migration (Hungarians)	Total Net Migration
2001	20,308	1,944	18,364	–	–	–	
2002	17,972	2,388	15,584	–	–	–	
2003	19,365	2,553	16,812	–	–	–	
2004	22,164	3,466	18,698	–	–	–	
2005	25,582	3,320	22,262	–	–	–	
2006	23,569	3,956	19,613	–	–	–	
2007	22,607	4,133	18,474	–	–	–	
2008	35,547	4,241	31,306	–	–	–	
2009	25,582	5,600	19,982	–	–	–	
2010	23,884	6,047	17,837	1,575	7,318	−5,743	12,094
2011	22,514	2,687	19,827	2,443	12,413	−9,970	9,857
2012	20,340	9,916	10,424	4,194	12,964	−8,770	1,654
2013	21,250	13,111	8,139	9,354	21,580	−12,226	−4,087
2014	26,004	10,828	15,176	11,356	31,385	−20,029	−4,853
2015	25,787	10,373	15,414	14,810	32,852	−18,042	−2,628
2016	23,803	10,464	13,339	16,215	29,425	−13,210	129
2017	36,453	12,872	23,581	20,906	26,957	−6,051	17,530
2018	49,312	24,370	24,942	23,401	23,808	−407	24,535
2019	55,297	27,895	27,402	23,172	21,900	1,272	28,674
2020	43,785	48,042	−4,257	23,104	19,322	3,782	−475
2021	49,069	46,269	2,800	22,583	21,730	853	3,653
2022	55,514	29,583	25,931	24,147	28,825	−4,678	21,253
2023	61,347	35,633	25,714	23,866	35,736	−11,870	13,844
2024	49,300	43,000	6,300	28,900	41,300	−12,400	−6,100
2025	47,200	46,600	600	31,700	39,650	−7,950	−7,350

=== Foreign citizenship population ===
Number of foreign citizens residing in Hungary on January 1: (countries with at least 2,000 persons)
Country	2017	2018	2019	2020	2021	2022	2023	2024	2025
(European Union) Germany	18,627	17,879	16,537	18,344	17,490	19,747	22,310	23,295	25,400
China	19,111	19,905	18,851	19,655	18,558	17,685	18,192	21,165	24,350
Ukraine	5,774	10,503	24,197	30,316	27,380	30,707	36,017	27,388	20,450
(European Union) Slovakia	9,519	9,652	9,563	10,582	14,677	16,040	16,744	16,899	17,150
(European Union) Romania	24,040	22,747	21,017	22,162	18,220	16,601	16,542	15,750	15,600
Vietnam	3,256	3,698	4,669	5,719	6,719	6,376	7,150	–	–
Russia	4,902	4,790	5,088	5,264	5,035	4,980	6,193	7,833	7,850
(European Union) Austria	4,021	3,743	3,142	3,318	4,132	4,637	4,922	5,027	5,200
(European Union) Italy	3,353	3,576	3,635	4,038	3,662	3,717	3,881	–	–
Serbia	2,312	3,356	5,342	4,989	3,471	3,518	3,988	3,852	3,250
Turkey	2,063	2,327	2,785	3,233	3,217	3,461	3,917	–	–
United Kingdom	3,081	3,190	3,105	3,540	3,373	3,323	3,392	–	–
(European Union) Netherlands	2,814	2,877	2,834	3,158	3,065	3,299	3,652	–	–
United States	3,198	3,373	3,387	3,501	2,977	3,051	3,069	3,080	3,150
(European Union) France	2,523	2,633	2,593	2,833	2,602	2,754	2,933	–	–
Mongolia	838	917	1,470	1,834	1,845	1,854	2,692	–	–
(European Union) Poland	2,061	1,928	1,960	2,145	2,017	2,038	2,063	2,077	2,100
Syria	1,519	1,987	2,139	2,195	2,277	1,889	1,941	–	–
Total	151,132	161,809	180,773	199,957	194,491	202,525	226,267	250,912	255,450

Foreign citizenship population by continent
Continent	2017 population	% of total	2018 population	% of total	2019 population	% of total	2020 population	% of total	2021 population	% of total	2022 population	% of total
Europe	99,194	65.63	104,254	64.43	117,552	65.03	131,291	65.66	124,422	63.97	131,431	64.90
Asia	39,937	26.42	44,692	27.62	49,056	27.14	53,099	26.56	54,730	28.14	55,000	27.16
America	5,397	3.57	5,891	3.64	6,850	3.79	7,631	3.82	6,933	3.56	7,454	3.68
Africa	5,985	3.96	6,334	3.91	6,660	3.68	7,278	3.64	7,748	3.98	8,028	3.96
Oceania	619	0.41	638	0.39	655	0.36	658	0.33	658	0.34	612	0.30

Foreign citizenship population by continent
Continent	2023 population	% of total	2024 population	% of total	2025 population	% of total	2026 population	% of total
Europe	144,102	63.69	139,243	55.49	135,527	53.06	133,796	53.03
Asia	64,945	28.7	92,644	36.92	99,887	39.1	97,390	38.6
America	7,591	3.35	7,854	3.13	7,952	3.11	7,903	3.13
Africa	9,041	3.99	10,597	4.22	11,516	4.51	12,626	5,01
Oceania	588	0.26	574	0.24	561	0.22	575	0.23

== Largest cities ==
Name	Population (1949)	Population (1990)	Population (2011)	Population (2022)	Agglomeration	Status
Budapest	1,590,316	2,016,681	1,729,040	1,682,426▼	3,310,786 (2022)	Capital city
Debrecen	115,399	212,235	211,320	199,520▼	281,432 (2022)	Regional centre, county seat, urban county
Szeged	104,867	169,930	168,048	158,022▼	197,245 (2022)	Regional centre, county seat, urban county
Miskolc	109,841	196,442	167,754	145,735▼	231,034 (2022)	Regional centre, county seat, urban county
Pécs	89,470	170,039	156,049	139,647▼	181,342 (2022)	Regional centre, county seat, urban county
Győr	69,583	129,331	129,527	128,050▼	275,574 (2022)	Regional centre, county seat, urban county
Nyíregyháza	56,334	114,152	119,746	116,439▼	175,211 (2022)	County seat, urban county
Kecskemét	61,730	102,516	111,411	108,334▼	180,023 (2022)	County seat, urban county
Székesfehérvár	42,260	108,958	100,570	94,906▼	–	Regional centre, county seat, urban county

== See also ==
- Hungarian diaspora
- Demographics of the Kingdom of Hungary by county
- History of Hungary
- Demographic history of Syrmia
- Magyarization
- Family policy in Hungary

== Sources ==
- Taylor, A.J.P. (1948). The Habsburg Monarchy 1809–1918 – A History of the Austrian Empire and Austria-Hungary. London: Hamish Hamilton.
