= Demographics of Budapest =

- Population pyramid of Budapest in 2022
- Population: 1,682,426 (2022)

The population of Budapest was 1,682,426 in 2022. According to the 2011 census, the Budapest metropolitan area was home to 2,530,167 people and the Budapest commuter area (real periphery of the city) had 3.3 million inhabitants. The Hungarian capital is the largest in the Pannonian Basin and the ninth largest in the European Union. Budapest is also the primate city of Hungary and some neighbouring territories.

== Population growth ==
The Capital city of Budapest was established on 17 November 1873 with the unification of three separate towns, named Buda, Óbuda and Pest. In 1720 Buda and Óbuda had 9,600 residents, while Pest was a small town with only 2,600 inhabitants. In the 18th and 19th century Pest became the natural commercial, transportation, industrial and cultural center of Hungary, Buda and Óbuda remained small towns. The population of Pest reached 50,000 in the 1820s, 100,000 in the 1840s and 200,000 in the 1860s. At the time of the unification Buda and Óbuda had 69,543 inhabitants, Pest was home to 227,294 people. The first modern Hungarian census was held in 1869–70, when the Hungarian Central Statistical Office enumerated 302,085 people at the present-territory of Budapest. Between the unification and the World War I Greater Budapest quadrupled its population, got a new global city upon the Danube. At that time Budapest was one of the fastest-growing cities in Europe, triggered by industrialisation and high natural growth rate and fertility of rural ethnic Hungarians. Internal migration peaked in the 1960s with near 250,000 people in correlate to post World War II baby boom and forced collectivization. The city became extremely overcrowded, the central government also perceived the problem and limited getting apartment in 1965, preventing overcrowding, housing shortage and the collapse of public works. This restriction raised a strong wave of suburbanization, which peaked after fall of the Communism, the number of inhabitants dropped to 1.7 million, while garden housing development is still decisive in the suburbs. Reurbanisation and gentrification getting on since the mid-2000s.

Year	1870	1880	1890	1900	1910	1920	1930	1941	1949
Budapest Capital	270,476	355,682	486,671	703,448	880,371	928,996	1,006,184	1,164,963	1,057,912
Suburbs	31,609	47,024	73,408	157,986	230,082	303,030	436,685	547,828	532,404
Greater Budapest	302,085	402,706	560,079	816,434	1,110,453	1,232,026	1,442,869	1,712,791	1,590,316

Year	1949	1960	1970	1980	1990	2001	2005	2011	2022
Budapest (Greater)	1,590,316	1,804,606	2,001,083	2,059,347	2,016,774	1,777,921	1,695,814	1,729,040	1,685,342
Suburbs	307,566	379,649	479,242	567,355	562,666	676,229	726,017	801,127	n/a
Budapest metropolitan area	1,897,882	2,184,255	2,480,325	2,626,702	2,579,440	2,454,150	2,421,831	2,530,167	n/a

== Ethnicity ==
After the conquest of the Carpathian Basin one of the main Hungarian (Magyar) tribes, named Megyer, settled in the present-territory of Budapest, more exactly on both banks of the river Danube in Békásmegyer („Frog's Megyer”) and Káposztásmegyer („Cabbage's Megyer”), now high-rise housing estates of the city. Endonym „Magyar” (for Hungarians) is originated from the tribe name „Megyer”. Following the Mongol Invasion of 1241, German colonists settled in the cities of Buda and Pest, forming the majority of the population and dominating the main urban institutions.

In Buda, the majority of the citizens were of German and local origin. The proportion of Germans (mainly of southern German and Austrian origin) and Hungarians (who make up the majority of the country's population), has shifted significantly over time from a German majority towards a Hungarian majority. In the 14th century, the German population still inhabited the entire area of the city, but by the 15th century, they were limited to the area of their parish. At first, the Germans were the exclusive holders of political and economic power, and they made up the majority of the population. However, from the last quarter of the 14th century, the Germans and Hungarians engaged in power struggles, which were resolved with the peace agreement of 1439 and a power-sharing arrangement based on parity that continued until the end of the Middle Ages. Behind this change was a demographic and social reorganization, which involved the growth of the Hungarian citizens in numbers, as well as an increase in its economic and political power. In the late Middle Ages, the two leading nations of the city were geographically separated from each other, with their parishes being divided and power over the city shared.

The native population fled from the area during the Ottoman wartimes, in the 17th century Buda was home to mainly Turkish and South Slavic population. Many of them died in the Battle of Buda in 1686, survivors were expelled. In the late-17th and the early-18th century Buda, Óbuda and Pest was settled by Germans from Southern Germany and the Rhineland. The proportion of Hungarians rose gradually since the late 18th century, overtook Germans around the unification in 1873. Between 1787 and 1910 number of ethnic Hungarians rose from 2.3 million to 10.2 million due to population explosion, generated by the resettlement of the Great Hungarian Plain and Lower Hungary by Hungarian settlers from the relatively overpopulated northern and western counties of the Kingdom of Hungary. Hungarian villages and market towns become overcrowded, Budapest has become the main destination of the rural surplus population due to industrialisation. Hungarians increased their number from 200,000 to 2,000,000 in Budapest between 1880 and 1980. By the end of the World War II, Budapest can be described as an ethnically homogeneous city.

According to the 2011 census the total population of Budapest was 1,729,040, of whom there were 1,397,851 (80.8%) Hungarians, 19,530 (1.1%) Romani, 18,278 (1.0%) Germans, 6,189 (0.4%) Romanians, 4,692 (0.3%) Chinese and 2,581 (0.1%) Slovaks. 301,943 people (17.5%) did not declare their ethnicity. Excluding these people Hungarians made up 98.0% of the total population. In Hungary people can declare more than one ethnicity, so the sum of ethnicities is higher than the total population.

== Languages ==
=== First language ===
According to the 2011 census, 1,712,153 people (99.0%) speak Hungarian, of whom 1,692,815 people (97.9%) speak it as a first language, while 19,338 people (1.1%) speak it as a second language.

Language	1715	1737	1750	1851	1880	1890	1900	1910	1920	1930	1941	2001	2011	2022
Hungarian	19.4%	22.5%	22.2%	36.6%	56.7%	67.1%	79.6%	85.9%	90.2%	94.3%	97%	98.7%	98.2%	96.5%
German	55.6%	57.8%	55.2%	56.4%	34.3%	23.7%	14%	9%	6.5%	3.8%	1.9%	0.2%	0.3%	0.3%
Slovak	2.2%	5.6%	6.5%	5%	6.1%	5.6%	3.4%	2.3%	1.5%	0.7%	0.3%	0.1%	-	-
Other	22.8%	14.1%	16.1%	2%	2.9%	3.6%	3%	2.8%	1.8%	1.2%	0.8%	0.6%	1.6%	3%

=== Second language ===
Language	2001	2011	2022
English	22.2%	31%	44%
German	16.3%	15.4%	16.2%
Russian	4%	3.2%	3.9%
French	3.3%	3.3%	3.9%
Spanish	0.9%	1.5%	2.2%
Romanian	1.6%	2.2%	2.2%
Italian	1.6%	2%	2.2%
Ukrainian	0.2%	0.4%	1.2%
Chinese	0.3%	0.5%	1%

== Religion ==
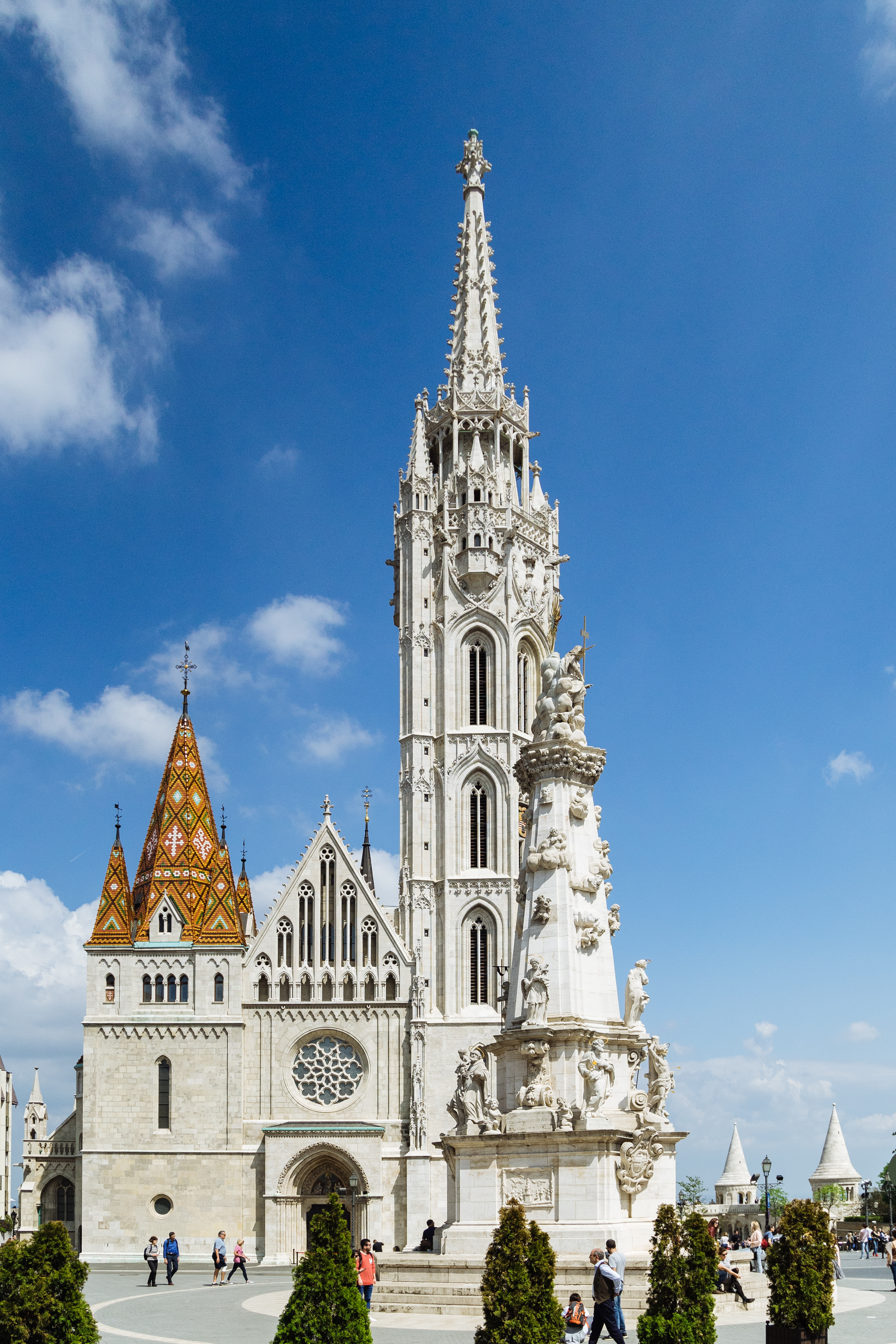
Matthias Church

Budapest is the home to one of the most populous Christian communities in Central Europe, numbering 698,521 people (40.4%) in 2011. The Hungarian capital is also the home of the largest Calvinist community on Earth. Hungarian Calvinists increased their number from 13,008 (4.8%) to 224,169 (12.6%) between 1870 and 2001 due to internal migration, triggered by higher fertility than other denominations. However the 2011 census showed decline in all religious groups - the number of Calvinists fell to 146,756 people (8.5%). Hungarian Roman Catholics remained the most populous separate group with 501,117 people (28.9%). Moreover, the most recent census was the first one in the city's history when the share of people attached to religious groups was below 50%.

Judaism also was a significant religion in Budapest, numbered 215,512 people (23.2%) in 1920, but they dropped to a smaller group (80,000 people, 4.2% in 2018) due to the Holocaust, secularization, and atheism, conversion to Christianity, and assimilation and intermarriages with non-Jews after 1945, and the immigration to Israel. Religious Hungarian Jews have had a low fertility rate, and natural decline began in the 1920s. The community is still very aged with 52.6 years median age, about ten years higher than Catholics (41.7 years) and Calvinists (42.5 years).

Jews were over-represented in specific professions within Budapest. In 1910, they made up 45% of lawyers, 43% of journalists and 62% of doctors.

Denomination	1870	1880	1890	1900	1910	1920	1930	1941	1949	2001	2011	2022
Roman Catholic	72.3%	69.4%	64.7%	60.7%	59.8%	59.1%	60.7%	63.1%	69.8%	53.9%	43.9%	22.6%
Calvinist	4.8%	6.1%	7.4%	8.9%	9.9%	10.9%	12.1%	13.6%	15.5%	14.8%	12.9%	7.5%
Lutheran	5.3%	5.5%	5.6%	5.3%	4.9%	4.8%	5%	5.3%	5.4%	3.1%	2.6%	1.6%
Jewish	16.6%	19.7%	21%	23.6%	23.1%	23.2%	20.3%	15.8%	6.4%	0.6%	0.6%	0.3%
Others	1%	1.3%	1.3%	1.5%	2.2%	2%	1.9%	1.6%	1.4%	4.6%	5.3%	4.3%
Without religion	0%	0%	0%	0%	0%	0%	0%	0%	0%	23.0%	35.1%	63.7%

== Migration and citizenship ==
According to the 2001 census, majority of the population of Budapest is originated from the Hungarian countryside. 230,307 people (13%) are from the Great Plain, 170,406 (9.6%) from Transdanubia, 93,665 (5.3%) from Pest county and 90,228 people (5.1%) are from Northern Hungary. Budapest is the hometown to 822,663 people (46.3%), while 87,746 people (4.9%) was born outside the present-day borders of Hungary. (See: Treaty of Trianon and Treaty of Paris)

In 2001, 1,736,521 (97.7%) Hungarian citizens, 6,507 (~0.4%) Hungarian and others and 34,824 (~2%) foreigners lived in Budapest. Ethnic Hungarians made up the majority of non-Hungarian citizens also, primary from Romania, former Yugoslavia and Ukraine. They have come to Hungary due to better possibility of employment.

According to the 2011 census, 1,600,585 people (92.6%) were born in Hungary, 126,036 people (7.3%) outside Hungary while the birthplace of 2,419 people (0.1%) was unknown.

According to the 2022 census, 94.2% of Budapest residents were Hungarian citizens, 1.7% were other EU citizens, and 4.1% were citizens of other countries.

== Politics and demography ==
According to the 2026 national election, the largest party of Budapest is the ruling pro-european conservative Respect and Freedom Party, headed by prime minister Péter Magyar. Tisza is followed by the eurosceptic Fidesz and the ultranationalist, far-right Our Homeland Movement.

In the Parliamentary elections of 2026, conservative Tisza Party won all of the 16 electoral districts of Budapest.

== See also ==
- Demographics of Hungary
- Budapest
- Greater Budapest
- Budapest metropolitan area

== Sources ==
- Károly Kocsis (DSc, University of Miskolc) – Zsolt Bottlik (PhD, Budapest University) – Patrik Tátrai: Etnikai térfolyamatok a Kárpát-medence határon túli régióiban, Magyar Tudományos Akadémia (Hungarian Academy of Sciences) – Földrajtudományi Kutatóintézet (Academy of Geographical Studies); Budapest; 2006.; ISBN 963-9545-10-4, CD Atlas
- Gábor Preisich: Budapest városépítésének története, Műszaki Könyvkiadó, Budapest, 1998, ISBN 963-16-1467-0
- Végh, András (2006). Buda város középkori helyrajza I. [Medieval topography of the city of Buda - Volume I] (PDF) (in Hungarian). Vol. Monumenta Historica Budapestinensia XV. Budapest: Budapesti Történeti Múzeum [Budapest History Museum].
