= Medieval Croatia =

Medieval Croatia included the following states and regions:

- Duchy of Croatia - medieval duchy, in existence between the 8th century and 925, in the center of competition between the Carolingian Empire, the Byzantine Empire and later the Republic of Venice
- Kingdom of Croatia - medieval kingdom covering most of present-day Croatia and Bosnia and Herzegovina (925–1102)
- Croatia in the union with Hungary - medieval kingdom in a personal union with the Kingdom of Hungary (1102–1526)

== See also ==
- Duchy of Lower Pannonia - medieval duchy from 9th century
- Croatia (disambiguation)
- Croatian (disambiguation)
