= Croatoan =

Croatoan may refer to:

- Croatoan Island (now Hatteras Island) on the Outer Banks of North Carolina
- Croatan tribe, alternately spelled "Croatoan"
- The word "Croatoan", found carved into a tree on Roanoke Island at the site of the Lost Colony in 1590
- "Croatoan" (short story), a 1975 short story by Harlan Ellison
- "Croatoan" (Supernatural), an episode of the U.S. television series
- Croatoan, a character in the Syfy series Haven played by William Shatner

== See also ==
- Croatan (disambiguation)
- Croatian (disambiguation)
