= Kingdom of Croatia =

Kingdom of Croatia may refer to:

- Kingdom of Croatia (925–1102), a medieval kingdom (Kingdom of Croatia and Dalmatia since 1060)
- Croatia in personal union with Hungary (1102–1526), a kingdom in personal union with the Kingdom of Hungary
- Kingdom of Croatia (Habsburg) (1527–1868), part of the lands of the Habsburg Monarchy (later Austrian Empire), part of the Lands of the Hungarian Crown
- Kingdom of Croatia-Slavonia (1868–1918), an autonomous kingdom within Austria-Hungary, part the Lands of the Crown of St. Stephen
- Independent State of Croatia (1941–1945), a puppet state during the Second World War, formally a kingdom until 1943

== See also ==
- Croatia (disambiguation)
- Croatian (disambiguation)
