= Little Budapest =

Little Budapest (Hungarian: Kis Budapest or Kis-Budapest) may refer to:

- Budapest, Hungary before the formation of Greater Budapest (presently used)
- One of the nicknames of Timișoara, Romania (Hungarian: Temesvár) at the turn of the 20th century
- A former neighborhood of the Lower East Side, New York City
- Buckeye-Shaker Square, a neighborhood of Cleveland, Ohio, United States
