= Croatia (disambiguation) =

Croatia is a country in Southeastern Europe.

Croatia may also refer to:

- any of the historical Croatian states:
  - Principality of Croatia, early medieval Croatian principality, from the 7th century up to 925
  - Kingdom of Croatia (925-1102), an independent medieval Croatian kingdom
  - Kingdom of Croatia (1102-1526), medieval Croatian kingdom in personal union with the Kingdom of Hungary
  - Kingdom of Croatia (1526-1867), early modern Croatian kingdom within the Habsburg Monarchy
  - Kingdom of Croatia and Slavonia (1867-1918), an autonomous kingdom under Hungary within Austria-Hungary
  - Banate of Croatia (1939-1941), an autonomous Croatian entity within the Kingdom of Yugoslavia
  - Independent State of Croatia (1941-1945), a puppet state of Italy and Germany during World War II
  - People’s Republic of Croatia (1946-1963), a federal unit of the Federal People’s Republic of Yugoslavia
  - Socialist Republic of Croatia (1963-1990), a federal unit of the Socialist Federal Republic of Yugoslavia
- Croatia proper, a geographical region in Croatia
- Croatia (European Parliament constituency)
- Mother Croatia, the female personification of the country

== Sports clubs ==
- Croatia Zagreb, 1993-2000 name of Dinamo Zagreb
- Adelaide Croatia, now Adelaide Croatia Raiders SC, Australia
- Melbourne Croatia, now Melbourne Knights FC, Australia
- Sydney Croatia, now Sydney United 58 FC, Australia

== See also ==
- White Croatia
- Red Croatia
- Kingdom of Croatia (disambiguation)
- Medieval Croatia (disambiguation)
- Pannonian Croatia (disambiguation)
- Littoral Croatia (disambiguation)
- Greater Croatia
- Eastern Croatia
- Southern Croatia
- Croatian (disambiguation)
- Hrvatska (disambiguation)
