= Serbo-Croatian (disambiguation) =

Serbo-Croatian, Croato-Serbian, Serbo-Croat or Croato-Serb, refers to a South Slavic language that is the primary language of Serbia, Croatia, Bosnia and Herzegovina, and Montenegro, as well as a minority language in Kosovo.

Serbo-Croatian, Serbo-Croat, Croato-Serbian, Croato-Serb, Serbian–Croatian, or Croatian–Serbian may also refer to any shared aspects of Serbia and Croatia, or the entire region in which the Serbo-Croatian language is spoken:

- Serbo-Croatian kinship, the system of family relationships among the people who speak Serbo-Croatian standard languages
- Croatian-Serbian relations – diplomatic, economic, and other relationships between Croatia and Serbia
- Serbo-Croatian War, 1991–1995, also known as the Croatian War of Independence
- Serbo-Croatian dialects
- Serbo-Croatian grammar
- Serbo-Croatian phonology
- Serbo-Croatian language secessionism
- Serbo-Croatian Cyrillic, a name for the Serbian Cyrillic alphabet, though not typically used in Croatia
- Serbo-Croatian Latin, a name for Gaj's Latin alphabet

== See also ==
- South Slavic dialect continuum, which includes the Serbo-Croatian language
- Shtokavian dialect of the Serbo-Croatian language
- Serbian (disambiguation)
- Croatian (disambiguation)
