= Pannonian Croatia =

Pannonian Croatia (Croatian: Panonska Hrvatska) may refer to:

- Slavs in Lower Pannonia#In Croatian historiography, a medieval duchy previously referred to as "Pannonian Croatia"
- Parts of modern-day Croatia in the Pannonian plain, roughly corresponding to the Continental Croatia statistical region (2012–2020)
- Pannonian Croatia (NUTS-2), one of the NUTS statistical regions of Croatia since 2021

== See also ==
- Croatia (disambiguation)
