= Littoral Croatia =

Littoral Croatia (Croatian: Primorska Hrvatska) may refer to:

- Duchy of Littoral Croatia, the early medieval state of the Croats
- Littoral parts of modern-day Croatia, namely Dalmatia and the Croatian Littoral

== See also ==
- Croatia (disambiguation)
- Adriatic Croatia, one of the NUTS statistical regions of Croatia since 2021
