= Hrvatski =

In the Croatian language, hrvatski is the masculine adjectival form meaning "Croatian", both in the plural and singular; it is hrvatska in the feminine singular, hrvatske in the feminine plural, hrvatsko in the neutral singular, hrvatska in the neutral plural. The word hrvatski is also used to refer to the Croatian language, whereas Hrvatska (first letter capital) is the native name for Croatia, the country. As such, all four forms (hrvatski, hrvatska, hrvatske and hrvatsko) commonly appear in native names of many Croatian government institutions, companies, political parties, organisations and sports clubs, as well as some place names.

Examples of the use of these works include:

== Organisations and companies ==
- Hrvatska akademija znanosti i umjetnosti or HAZU, Croatian Academy of Sciences and Arts
- Hrvatska elektroprivreda or HEP, national power company
- Hrvatska pošta or HP, Croatian Post
- Hrvatska radiotelevizija or HRT, national broadcasting corporation
- Hrvatske autoceste or HAC, national motorways company
- Hrvatske ceste (literally "Croatian Roads"), state-owned road maintenance company
- Hrvatske željeznice or HŽ, Croatian Railways
- Hrvatski autoklub or HAK, Croatian Automobile Club
- Hrvatski nogometni savez or HNS, Croatian Football Federation
- T-Hrvatski Telekom or T-HT, Croatian telecom company
- Hrvatsko ratno zrakoplovstvo i protuzračna obrana or Croatian Air Force and Air Defence

== Political parties ==
- Hrvatska demokratska zajednica or HDZ (Croatian Democratic Union)
- Hrvatska narodna stranka or HNS (Croatian People's Party)
- Hrvatska seljačka stranka or HSS (Croatian Peasant Party)
- Hrvatska stranka umirovljenika or HSU (Croatian Party of Pensioners)
- Hrvatska stranka prava or HSP (Croatian Party of Rights)
- Hrvatski suverenisti or HS (Croatian Sovereignists)

== Places in Croatia ==
- Hrvatsko Zagorje, a region in northern Croatia
- Hrvatsko primorje, a region in western Croatia
- Hrvatska Dubica, village in central Croatia
- Hrvatska Kostajnica, small town in central Croatia
- Hrvatski Leskovac, village near Zagreb
- Hrvatsko, Primorje-Gorski Kotar County, a village near Delnice, Croatia
- Hrvatsko Selo (lit. 'Croatian village'), a village near Topusko, Croatia

== Other uses ==
- NK Hrvatski dragovoljac (lit. Croatian Volunteer), association football club based in Zagreb
- Hrvatski Band Aid, Croatian supergroup notable for recording the charity single Moja domovina in 1991
- Hrvatski Idol, Croatian version of the television talent show Pop Idol which aired between 2003 and 2005
- Hrvatski Top Model Croatian version of the reality television series America's Next Top Model
- Stadion Hrvatski vitezovi, association football stadium in Dugopolje, literally meaning "Croatian Knights Stadium"
- Hrvatski (DJ), pseudonym of the American electronic music artist Keith Fullerton Whitman (b. 1973)

== See also ==
- Croatian (disambiguation)
