= Croatan Beach =

- Neighborhood
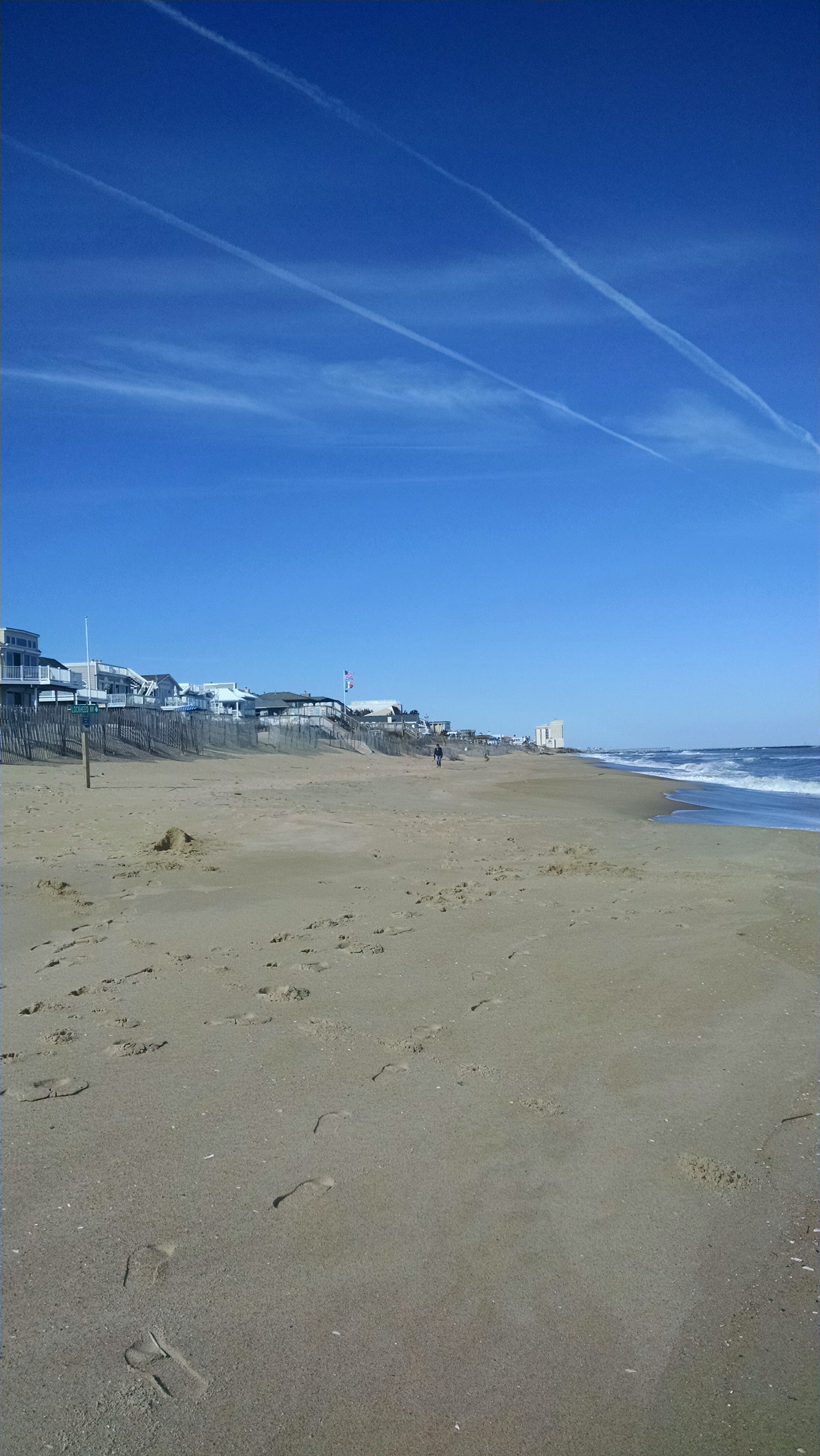
- A skyline view of Croatan Beach

- Location within the Commonwealth of Virginia Croatan Beach (the United States)
- Coordinates: 36°49′20″N 75°58′7″W
- Country: United States
- State: Virginia
- Independent city: Virginia Beach
- Time zone: UTC−5 (Eastern (EST))
  - Summer (DST): UTC−4 (EDT)

Croatan Beach is a residential neighborhood in the independent city of Virginia Beach, Virginia, United States. It is located on the Atlantic Ocean south of Rudee Inlet and north of Camp Pendleton near the Virginia Beach oceanfront. It is situated in a prime location once planned as a religious and educational resort that was to be called Chautauqua-By-The-Sea.

In addition to the Atlantic Ocean, the community is on the shores of Lake Wesley and Lake Christine. There is a public parking lot with beach access on the south end of Croatan. The East Coast Surfing Championships have been held just north of Rudee Inlet for 40 years.

Nearby neighborhoods include Shadowlawn, Beach Borough, and the North End.

== Surfing ==
"Croatan Beach is three quarters of a mile long and stretches from Rudee Inlet to Camp Pendleton. With 2 designated surfing areas (one at the north beginning at Rudee Inlet and one at the south at Camp Pendleton), it has long been a favorite of local surfers. Lifeguard services are now available for swimmers and surfers alike, and are situated along the entire beach front. Summer surf camp and surfing lessons are offered at the southern designated surfing area during the months of June, July & August by Seth Broudy School of Surf.
