= Reurbanisation =

Movement of people back into a previously abandoned area

Reurbanisation refers to the movement of people back into an urban area that has been previously abandoned. Reurbanisation is usually a government's initiative to counter the problem of inner city decline. Inner-city decline usually occurs when problems such as pollution, overpopulation, inadequate housing, crime, and other factors arise.

== See also ==
- Land recycling
- Urban renewal
- World Urbanism Day
- YIMBY
