= USS Croatan =

Two ships of the United States Navy have been named USS Croatan, after the Croatan Sound of the North Carolina coast.

- USS Croatan (CVE-14), was an escort carrier loaned to the United Kingdom and operated as HMS Fencer from February 1943 to 1946.
- USS Croatan (CVE-25), was also an escort carrier, commissioned August 1943 and placed out of service in 1946, but operated by a civilian crew for some years thereafter.
