= Croatian =

Croatian may refer to:

- Croatia
- Croatian language
- Croatian people
- Croatians (demonym)

== See also ==
- Croatan (disambiguation)
- Croatia (disambiguation)
- Croatoan (disambiguation)
- Hrvatski (disambiguation)
- Hrvatsko (disambiguation)
- Serbo-Croatian (disambiguation)
