= György Bulányi =

Hungarian Catholic priest and pacifist teacher (1919-2010)

György P. Bulányi
- Born: January 9, 1919; Budapest
- Died: June 6, 2010 (aged 91); Budapest

György P. Bulányi (Budapest, 9 January 1919 – Budapest, June 6, 2010) was a Piarist priest, teacher, and leader of the Bokor Catholic youth discipleship movements in Croatia and Hungary which faced strong suppression from the Hungarian communist government and Catholic hierarchy for their advocacy of conscientious objection.

== Early life ==
Bulányi graduated from the College of Teacher Education, the College of Paleontology, and then the Pázmány Péter University of Sciences. In 1943 he was ordained a priest in the Piarist Order. He then taught in a Piarist high school serving Sátoraljaújhely, Tata, and Debrecen. In March 1945, a Croatian Jesuit named Kolakovićs came to Hungary to form base communities of youth with the permission of József Mindszenty, bishop of Veszprém. Kolakovićs viewed the model of base communities or cell groups as a survival strategy in the face of likely communist suppression where leaders might be unavailable. Bulányi and Kolakovićs collaborated to in the formation of the high school students who joined this community, and the group came to be called Bokor meaning "bush". They were sometimes also called Bulányists.

== Bokor ==
Bokor was focused on following Jesus and cultivating a love for Jesus. Bokor taught principles of altruism, humility, voluntary poverty, service to the poor, and Christian pacifism. Bokor opposed all involvement in the military and use of force. It was a movement designed for exponential growth, intending to train participants to start their own leaderless cell group of 4–12 friends. The movement was egalitarian, offering all participants the opportunity to share their own opinions, and group prayers were performed by taking turns.

In 1949, Bulányi wrote a pamphlet Régi Írás (Old Scripture) on behalf of a group calling itself Bokor-Öko (Bush-Eco). The pamphlet asserted that humanity has a moral responsibility to respect nature, preserve the natural environment, and consider the impacts of actions on future generations. This is one of the earliest documents of the modern environmental movement in Hungary.

Bokor opposed the atheist communist ideology of the Hungarian state under Mátyás Rákosi, and continued to clash specifically on the topic of pacifism. The Hungarian State Church Office to the Bishop warned them that this position would not be tolerated, but Bokor held firm on this issue. The Hungarian government viewed the Bokor community as an illegal anti-state organization, and sentenced Bulányi to life imprisonment in 1952. He escaped in October 1956 during the Hungarian revolution and became a parish priest in downtown Budapest. However, he was arrested again in April 1958 and later released again in 1960. At this time, he was one of the most controversial figures in Hungarian Catholicism. He then worked as an unskilled labourer while he wrote a book, Seek the kingdom of God!

Bokor grew throughout the 1960s and became even more visible after 1970, despite ongoing suppression from both the government and the Catholic hierarchy. For those interested in deeper discipleship, Bokor offered a 5 year theological course involving about 78–80 spiritual exercises per year. In 1989, Bokor had 185 leaders, 35 of whom were priests. The movement was connected to the base communities of Latin American liberation theology. Bokor continued to be suppressed by the Hungarian government until 1990.

== Conscientious objection advocacy ==
From the end of the 1970s into 1981, Bulányi became more vocal in preaching pacifism and conscientious objection publicly, and the practice increased markedly. Dozens of Bokor members were imprisoned for their pacifist stance. Hungarian Catholic officials, led by László Paskai, archbishop of Esztergom-Budapest, strongly objected to Bulányi's teaching, considering it harmful and dangerous. They issued a formal condemnation of conscientious objection in October 1986. These officials supported government suppression of conscientious objectors, and imprisonments continued throughout the 1980s. Continued advocacy from groups like Bokor and interaction with Catholics outside of Hungary softened their perspective, however, and in March 1988, Paskai suggested that the Prime Minister allow alternative civilian service. Paskai later claimed to have been constrained by the autocratic government and said that he had no choice but to collaborate in suppression.

== Conflict with Catholic hierarchy ==
The Hungarian government and Catholic hierarchy responded by seeking to discredit Bulányi by presenting evidence that his writings were heretical. There was significant debate about Bulányi's writings such as Church order and Is obedience a virtue?, drawing input from theologians such as Hans Küng. In a 31 December 1986 letter, Cardinal Joseph Ratzinger, head of the Congregation for the Doctrine of the Faith, asked Bulányi to publicly withdraw his teachings on the universal priesthood of the laity as false, dangerous ambiguous, and heretical. Bulányi did not agree with Ratzinger's assessment, and for a decade these strong official statements against Bulányi remained. After the change in government in Hungary in 1989, the Hungarian state requested forgiveness from Bulányi. However, leaders of the Catholic Church did not apologize.

Finally, in February 1997, Bulányi and Ratzinger came to an agreement, with John Paul II offering greater freedom of conscience than Ratzinger had previously accepted. Bulányi cooperated, clarified his teachings, and signed a statement requested of him. On 5 April 1997, Ratzinger wrote that he considered the matter closed. On 10 September 1997, there was a public announcement of the formal rehabilitation of Bulányi in the Catholic Church, and he was once again permitted to conduct mass.

The Hungarian Catholic Bishops' Conference published the statements of Bulányi and Ratzinger without comment. Some Hungarian Catholics were disappointed that the Conference didn't offer an apology for their behavior toward Bulányi and his supporters. These Catholic viewed the actions of the Catholic hierarchy as improper use of power in collaboration with an immoral autocratic state. Even after rehabilitation, Bulányi continued to be marginalized within the Catholic community. From 2005 until his death, Bulányi lived with other Piarists in the Kalazantinum of Budapest.

== Views ==
Bulányi identified with the views of Marcion of Sinope in rejecting the Old Testament as uninspired, immoral, and incompatible with the character of the God of Jesus who is love.

Bulányi affirmed a church structure consisting of base communities, based on a theological affirmation of universal priesthood of the laity.

== Works ==
- György Bulányi (1945). A magyar hangsúly romlása [The deterioration of Hungarian accent] (in Hungarian). Budapest: University Press.
- György Bulányi. Church Order.
- György Bulányi (1989). Erény-e az engedelmesség? [Is obedience a virtue?] (in Hungarian). Luzern: The Hungarian Center for Theological-Pasticization Studies.
- György Bulányi (2002). Napló [Diary] (PDF) (in Hungarian). Püski.
- György Bulányi (1991). Örököljük a földet? [Are we inheriting the earth?] (in Hungarian). Budapest: Irotron kiadó. ISBN 978-963-04-1614-6.
- It was laid in Jászol. Christmas meditations by György Bulányi, 1949–1993; Irotron, Bp., 1993
- György Bulányi (1986). Nagypénteki levél [Good Friday letter: Correspondence with Cardinal Ratzinger] (in Hungarian). Budapest: Irotron. ISBN 9789638462008.
- György Bulányi (1991). Merre menjek [Where should I go?] (in Hungarian). Budapest: Irotron kiado. ISBN 978-963-04-1613-9. OCLC 438681662.
- György Bulányi (2013). Merre ne menjek? avagy Hogyan lett a tarzusi Saulból Szent Pál? [Do not go where?, or How did Saul of Tarsus become Saint Paul?] (in Hungarian).
- György Bulányi (1995–1996). Saint Paul's theology 1–6. Budapest: Bokorliget.
- György Bulányi (2013). Pál szintézis [Paul's synthesis] (in Hungarian). Faragó Ferenc.
- György Bulányi; Gyula I. Simonyi (2000). Rapture of the Gospel (1. Church Order, 2. Economy of LifeHarmony, Challenge of Nonviolence). Translated by John Eibner; Katalin Simonyi. Székesfehérvár, Hungary: BOKOR, BOCS Foundation. ISBN 978-963-640-415-4. OCLC 43934408.
- Ferenc Faragó; Schanda Beáta, eds. (2015). Bulányi György füves könyve [The grassy book of György Bulányi] (in Hungarian). Budapest: Bokor Community Development Cultural Association. ISBN 9789631222111.
- György Bulányi (1995). A Bokor lelkisége [Bokor's spirituality] (in Hungarian). Budapest: Bokorliget K. ISBN 978-963-04-5285-4. OCLC 908989070.
- György Bulányi. Ezredvégi tájékozódás: AZ ISTEN ORSZÁGA MEGVALÓSULÁSÁNAK LEHETŐSÉGEI [Orientation at the end of the millennium: The possibility of the kingdom of God] (in Hungarian).
- György Bulányi (1968). Keressétek az Isten országát! [Seek the kingdom of God!] (in Hungarian). Budapest: Irotron. ISBN 978-963-02-7669-6. (six-volumes)
  - Seek the Kingdom of God! Where did it come from?
  - Seek the Kingdom of God! Why did you come?
  - Seek the Kingdom of God! The road
  - Seek the Kingdom of God! Not accepted in
  - Seek the Kingdom of God! The country
- György Bulányi. Válogatott írások: OPTIMISTA, PESSZIMISTA VOLT-E JÉZUS? [Selected writings, including Was Jesus an optimist or a pessimist?] (in Hungarian).
- György Bulányi (2011). Faragó Ferenc (ed.). Bulányi György gondolatai: Szikrák egy fáklya lángolásából [György Bulányi's thoughts: Sparks from a flaming torch] (in Hungarian). Budapest: Bokor Közösségfejlesztő, Kulturális Egyesület (BOKKE). ISBN 978-963-08-1064-7.
- György Bulányi's presentation on the secret state preparation of the bishop's judgment against him
- György Bulányi (2003). Untitled Analysis of Béla Hamvas Christianity and Tradition (in Hungarian). Tiszapalkonya. Archived from the original on 2018-04-17.

== See also ==
- Béla Hamvas
- Katolikus Ifjúsági Mozgalom
- László Lukács
- Regnum Marianum Community
- Sándor Sík
