= Catholic Church in Hungary =

Coordinates: 47.5107°N 19.0797°E

- Hungarian: Katolikus Egyház Magyarországon
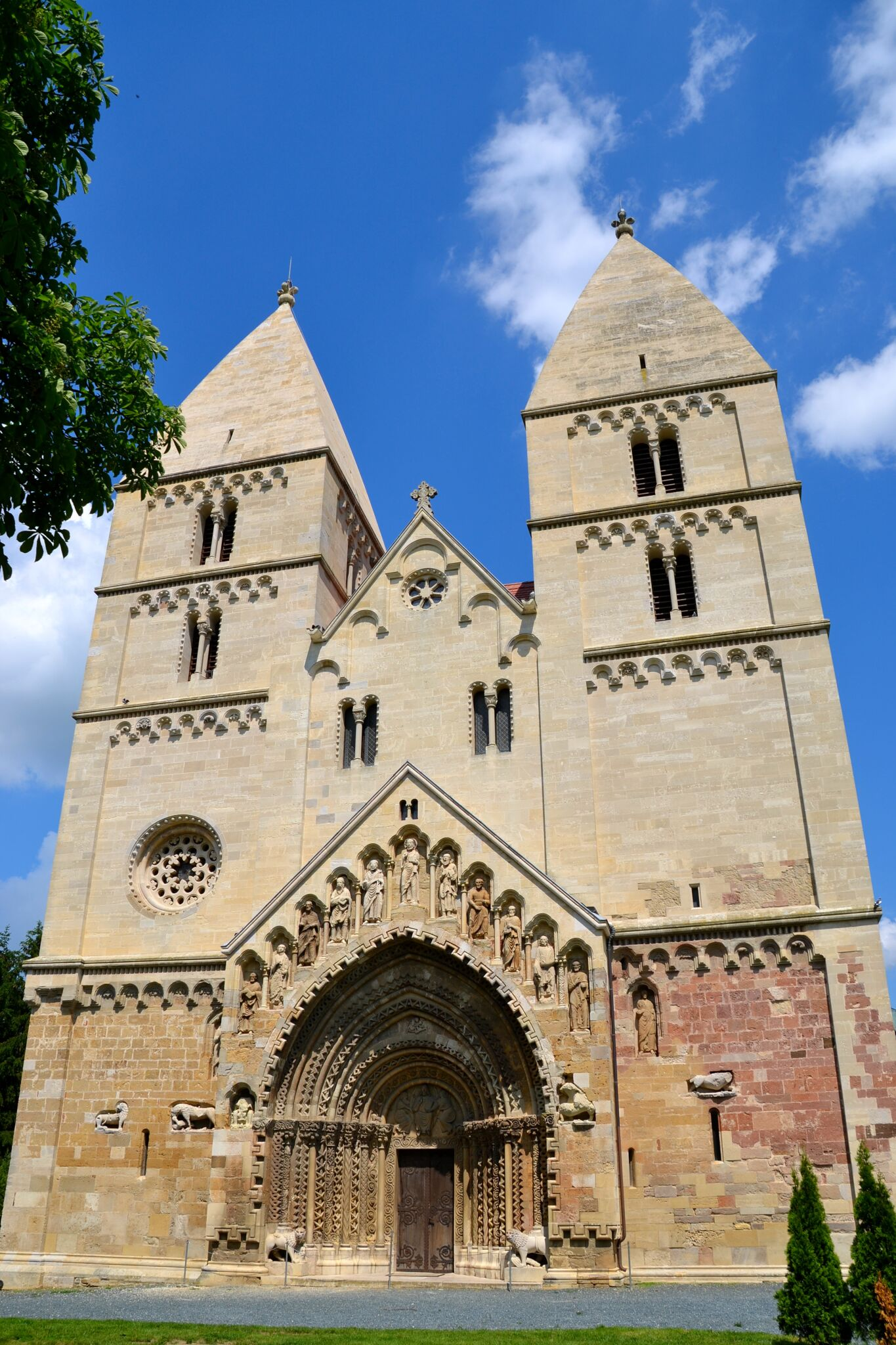
- Ják Abbey, a 13th-century former Benedictine monastery and currently a medieval Catholic church.
- Classification: Catholic
- Orientation: Latin and Eastern Catholic
- Pope: Leo XIV
- Leader: Cardinal Péter Erdő; Archbishop of Esztergom-Budapest; The Primate of Hungary
- Region: Hungary
- Headquarters: Esztergom, Hungary
- Founder: Stephen I of Hungary
- Origin: 1000; Esztergom, Hungary
- Separations: Reformed Church in Hungary
- Members: 5,890,000 (2023)
- Official website: https://katolikus.hu/en

Map of the Catholic dioceses of Hungary

Religion in Hungary (Eurobarometer, September 2019):
1. Catholicism (62.0%)
2. No religion (20.0%)
3. Protestantism (5.00%)
4. Other Christians (8.00%)
5. Judaism (1.00%)
6. Other (2.00%)
7. Undeclared (2.00%)

The Catholic Church in Hungary is part of the worldwide Roman Catholic Church under the spiritual leadership of the pope in Rome. The Latin Church in the country is divided into 12 dioceses, including 4 archdioceses. In addition, there is a Latin territorial abbey at Pannonhalma Archabbey and a separate sui juris particular Church for those who adhere to the Byzantine Rite, which is known as the Hungarian Greek Catholic Church.

== Contemporary Church ==
According to a 2019 survey by Eurobarometer, 62% of Hungarians consider themselves Catholics. Caritas Hungary is the social and humanitarian relief arm of the Church. Cardinal Péter Erdő was seen as a leading candidate in the 2025 conclave. Erdő, who participated in the 2005 conclave and the 2013 conclave that respectively elected Pope Benedict XVI and Pope Francis, gained significant support and was the favoured choice of conservative Catholic networks in the United States.

=== Latin hierarchy ===
- Archdiocese of Esztergom-Budapest with its suffragan dioceses:
  - Diocese of Győr
  - Diocese of Székesfehérvár
- Archdiocese of Kalocsa-Kecskemét with its suffragan dioceses:
  - Diocese of Pécs
  - Diocese of Szeged–Csanád
- Archdiocese of Eger with its suffragan dioceses:
  - Diocese of Debrecen–Nyíregyháza
  - Diocese of Vác
- Archdiocese of Veszprém with its suffragan dioceses:
  - Diocese of Kaposvár
  - Diocese of Szombathely

Under the immediate jurisdiction of the Holy See in Rome are:

- the territorial abbey of Pannonhalma

=== Hungarian Greek Catholic hierarchy ===
- Archeparchy of Hajdúdorog with its suffragan eparchies:
  - Eparchy of Miskolc
  - Eparchy of Nyiregyhaza

== See also ==
- Eastern Orthodoxy in Hungary
- Elizabeth of Hungary
- Esztergom Basilica
- György Bulányi
- Holy Crown of Hungary
- József Mindszenty
- Katolikus Ifjúsági Mozgalom
- Regnum Marianum Community
- Religion in Hungary
- Saint Stephen's Basilica
- Stephen I of Hungary
- Tamás Bakócz (serious candidate in the 1513 conclave from Hungary)
