= Béla Hamvas =

Hungarian thinker

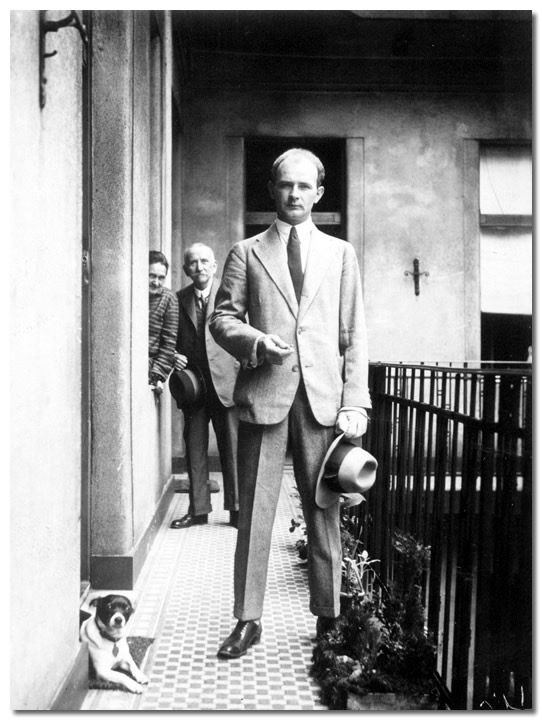
Béla Hamvas

Béla Hamvas (23 March 1897 – 7 November 1968) was a Hungarian writer, philosopher, and social critic. He was the first thinker to introduce the Traditionalist School of René Guénon to Hungary.

== Biography ==
Béla Hamvas was born on 23 March 1897 in Eperjes, Sáros County, Kingdom of Hungary (present-day Prešov, Slovakia). His father, József Hamvas was a Lutheran pastor, teacher of German and Hungarian, journalist and writer. The family moved to Pozsony (Bratislava) in 1898. After completing his secondary education at the Evangelical Lyceum there in the spring of 1914, he took a short tour of Western Europe with his father. In 1915, spurred on by patriotic fervor, he enlisted as a volunteer soldier alongside his former schoolmates. After a year and a half of training at the cadet school, he was posted to the Eastern Front in the summer of 1916 at his own request. During the fierce fighting that unfolded during the Brusilov Offensive, he suffered a nervous breakdown, was admitted to a military hospital, and then continued his recovery at home, in his parents’ house. In 1917, he learnt the art of confectionery from relatives in Igló. Later that same year, he was called up again; the troop transport train carrying him to the northern Italian front was hit by a shell in Slovenia, and he was permanently injured by the blast.

While recovering at his aunt’s guesthouse in Ótátrafüred, he read the works of Kant, Rimbaud, Dostoevsky, Schopenhauer and Nietzsche, among others. Decades later, in Patmos, he recalled how reading Kierkegaard’s The Present Age prompted him to trace the roots of the crisis of European civilisation back through history, "the first lie", only to realise that "its deepest source lay not outside himself, but within".

In 1919 his father refused an oath of allegiance to the new nation of Czechoslovakia, whereupon his family was expelled from Bratislava. They moved to Budapest, where Hamvas attended Péter Pázmány University. After graduation he became a journalist at the newspapers Budapesti Hírlap and Szózat. Hamvas considered this job shallow and menial, but he had to support his family (although his father received a pension from 1924). Three years later he quit, as he had found a better job in the main library of Budapest. He was appointed as a senior librarian in 1927. By this time he was writing articles, reviews and essays for 25 different journals.

Hamvas became the first Hungarian follower of the Italian fascist Julius Evola in the 1930s, introducing the latter's work to Hungary. He was also well-versed in the works of René Guénon. In line with Evola's views, in which he incorporated a stronger emphasis on Christian beliefs, Hamvas strove for an undemocratic regime led by a small "enlightened" elite of intellectuals. To accomplish this goal, Hamvas and Károly Kerényi (who had been his closest friend since the 1920s) founded the Sziget ("Isle") circle in 1935, a literary group which also included figures such as the biological racist László Németh. However, Hamvas had a falling-out with Kerényi in the late 1930s. Other prominent adherents of the Sziget circle included Antal Szerb and the composer Antal Molnár.

Hamvas married Ilona Angyal in 1929, but divorced her in 1936 to marry Katalin Kemény in 1937. Kemény was a co-founder of the Sziget circle. Nearly 20 years of library work was ended by World War II. Hamvas was drafted for military service three times. He continued his literary work while on the front lines - translating Laozi and Heraclitus among others. His first essay collection was published in 1943.

The couple survived the siege of Budapest. Their apartment was hit by bombing, destroying his library and manuscripts. Despite the Soviet siege and repeated harassment by the authorities, 1945 to 1947 were his most fruitful years. According to Béla Tábor, he joined the Hungarian Communist Party after the war and remained its member for nearly three years. Between 1945 and 1948 Hamvas held lectures and edited the series Leaflets of the University Press.

In 1948 he was placed on the b-list (banned from publishing) by the Soviet-installed socialist government, and was forced into retirement from his library job. This happened after Hamvas had started "an aesthetic and ideological discussion with György Lukács". Lukács had entered into conflict with Hamvas because the latter saw in surrealism and abstract art the heritage of magic and opposed “realistic” art. He was forced to work as a night watchman instead. Although he had published more than 250 works before his ban, most of Hamvas's body of work was written anonymously later on. He got a licence to farm in the garden of his brother-in-law in Szentendre, and tended plants there between 1948 and 1951, during which time he also completed Karnevál, one of his major essays.

Between 1951 and 1964 he was employed as an unskilled worker in power plants in Tiszapalkonya, Inota and Bokod, under harsh conditions. Whenever he had spare time he translated from Sanskrit, Hebrew and Greek, and wrote about the Cabala, Zen, and Sufism. Between 1959 and 1966 he completed Patmosz, his last major work. However, over the course of his last two decades, he only published one article in 1963 as well as a number of literary translations.

Throughout the post-war era, Hamvas communicated many of his ideas surrounding Traditionalism to the younger philosopher András Lászlo. The latter would go on to organize underground classes for groups of dissidents from 1975 onwards.

Aged 67, Béla Hamvas finally received a pension. Hamvas died in Budapest on November 7, 1968. He was buried in Szentendre.

== Legacy ==
After the fall of socialism, several Traditionalist groups sprang up in Hungary, often based on the teachings of Hamvas as these were transmitted by Lászlo. These included a Béla Hamvas Circle (Hamvas Béla Kör) as well as three "Evolian" groups (Kard-Kerezst-Korona Szövetség, Apokalipszis Iskolája and Árpád Szigeti's School of Tradition and Transcendence) and the Evolian printing house Arkhé.

In 1990, Hamvas posthumously received the Kossuth Prize.

According to cultural theorist Magdalena Marsovszky, Hamvas' preference for a form of cultural nationalism (as opposed to more crude forms of ethnonationalism) has led to a misguided identification of Hamvas as an anti-fascist, which fails to inquire into the far-right and elitist views of Hamvas and his intellectual connections to Evola.

== Partial bibliography ==
=== Non-fiction ===
- Magyar Hüperion (1936, Hungarian Hyperion)
- Szellem és egzisztencia (1941, Spirit and Existence), an essay discussing the philosophy of Karl Jaspers
- A láthatatlan történet (1943, The Invisible Story)
- Scientia Sacra vol. 1–6 (1942–43), which deals with the philosophy of the Far East (the Upanishads, Tao Te King, the Tibetan Book of the Dead and others) and European mysticism
- Anthologia humana: Ötezer év bölcsessége (1946, Human Anthology – The Wisdom of Five Millennia)
- Forradalom a művészetben: Absztrakció és szürrealizmus Magyarországon (1947, Revolution in Art: Abstraction and Surrealism in Hungary), written together with his wife, on the history of Hungarian art from Károly Ferenczy, Tivadar Csontváry Kosztka and Lajos Gulácsy up to the “European School”
- Unicornis, Titkos Jegyzőkönyv, Silentium (1948–51, published 1987, Unicorn, Secret Protocol, Silence)
- Patmosz (1959–1966, published 1992, Patmos), an essay collection whose title alludes to John the Apostle’s exile to Patmos
- Scientia Sacra: az őskori emberiség szellemi hagyománya II. rész: A kereszténység (1960–64, published 1988, Sacred Science – Spiritual Heritage of Mankind, part II. Christianity)

=== Fiction ===
- Karnevál (1948–51, published 1985, Carnival)
- Szilveszter (1957, published 1991, New Year’s Eve)
- Bizonyos tekintetben (1961, published 1991, From a Certain Aspect)
- Ugyanis (1966–67, published 1991, Therefore)

== See also ==
- György Bulányi
