= Historiography of the Crusades =

Study of history-writing of the crusades

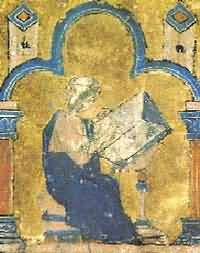
William of Tyre writing his history, from a 13th-century Old French translation, Bibliothèque Nationale, Paris, MS 2631, f.1r

The historiography of the Crusades is the study of history-writing and the written history, especially as an academic discipline, regarding the military expeditions initially undertaken by European Christians in the 11th, 12th, or 13th centuries to the Holy Land. This scope was later extended to include other campaigns initiated, supported, and sometimes directed by the Roman Catholic Church. The subject has involved competing and evolving interpretations since the capture of Jerusalem in 1099 until the present day. The religious idealism, use of martial force and pragmatic compromises made by those involved in crusading were controversial, both at the time and subsequently. Crusading was integral to Western European culture, with the ideas that shaped behaviour in the Late Middle Ages retaining currency beyond the 15th century in attitude rather than action.

From the 17th century historians began rejecting the religious motivations applied to crusading and instead examined the secular. The building of nation states led to the application of interpretations in support of this and fundamentally discrete from the religious sphere. This presented a challenge in reconciling the idealistic and the materialistic motives of the protagonists. The internationalism of crusading remained an obstacle to those historians wishing to project both the idea of crusading and the Crusades themselves as nationalistic precedents. Enlightenment thinkers considered the crusaders culturally inferior to themselves and Protestants considered them morally so.

By the 19th century the development of nationalism, colonial politics, and critical history increased interest in the subject for the purposes of entertainment and moralising. In the early 20th century a focus developed on the part crusades played as drivers of medieval conquest, economics, and the legacy they left. Crusading historiography continues to evolve and covers a wide range of issues.

== Terminology ==
The Oxford English Dictionary defines historiography as firstly The writing of history; written history. and secondly The study of history-writing, especially as an academic discipline. The term "crusade" first referred to a military expedition undertaken by European Christians in the 11th, 12th, or 13th centuries to the Holy Land. The conflicts to which the term was applied were later extended to include other campaigns initiated, supported and sometimes directed by the Roman Catholic Church against pagans and heretics or for other alleged religious ends. From the first papal decree in 1095, these differed from other Christian religious wars in that they were considered a penitential exercise rewarding the participants with forgiveness for all confessed sins. Pope Urban II was recorded to have said, as translated by Robert Somerville, "whoever for devotion alone not to obtain honour or money, goes to Jerusalem to liberate the Church of God can substitute the journey for all penance".

The usage of the term "crusade" can create a misleading impression of coherence, particularly regarding the early Crusades, and the definition is a matter of historiographical debate among contemporary historians. At the time of the First Crusade, iter, "journey", and peregrinatio, "pilgrimage" were used as the descriptions of the campaign. Crusader terminology remained largely indistinguishable from that of Christian pilgrimage during the 12th century. Only at the end of the century was a specific language of crusading adopted in the form of crucesignatus—"one signed by the cross"—for a crusader. This led to the French croisade—the way of the cross. By the mid-13th century the cross became the major descriptor of the crusades with crux transmarina—"the cross overseas"—used for crusades across the Mediterranean Sea, and crux cismarina—"the cross this side of the sea"—for those in Europe.

Riley-Smith, a dominant and influential figure in academic crusade studies, defined a 'Crusade' as an expedition undertaken on papal authority. This definition excludes the Spanish Reconquista, even though participants were granted Papal indulgences, which conferred the same privileges. Historian Giles Constable identified four specific areas of focus for contemporary crusade studies; their political or geographical objectives, how they were organised, how far they were an expression of popular support, or the religious reasons behind them.

== Chronological and geographical frameworks ==
Eastern Mediterranean, 1135; Crusader states indicated with a red cross ☩

The Crusader states established in the Eastern Mediterranean in 1098 persisted in some form for over two centuries, and relied on a constant flow of men and money from the West. Knights either travelled to the Holy Land as individuals, or as one of the military orders, including the Knights Templar, Knights Hospitaller and the Teutonic Order. The church granted them immunity from lawsuits, forgiveness of debt, and general protection for individual property and family. This meant the crusading experience and ideology was far more pervasive than the 'Crusades', which were major expeditions launched with Papal support. French Catholic lawyer Étienne Pasquier (1529–1615) is thought to be the first historian to attempt the numbering of each crusade in the Holy Land. He suggested there were six. 18th century historians narrowed the chronological and geographical scope to the Levant and the Outremer between 1095 and 1291. Some such as Georg Christoph Muller only counted the five large expeditions that reached the eastern Mediterranean—1096–1099, 1147–1149, 1189–1192, 1217–1229 and 1248–1254. In 1820 Charles Mills counted nine distinct crusades. Numbering conventions are retained, mainly for convenience and tradition, but are somewhat arbitrary systems for what some historians now consider to be seven major and numerous lesser campaigns.

The crusades to the Holy Land provided a template for other campaigns conducted in the interest of the Latin Church:

- The Spanish Christian kingdoms overcame Muslim Al-Andalus in the 12th and 13th century;
- Between the 12th to 15th century German expansion into the pagan Baltic region;
- Non-conformity was suppressed, particularly in Languedoc during what has become called the Albigensian Crusade;
- The assertion of Papal temporal ambitions in Italy and Germany that are now known as political crusades.

In addition the 13th and 14th centuries saw unsanctioned, but related popular uprisings to recover Jerusalem known variously as Shepherds' or Children's crusades.

== Studies of primary sources ==
In 1841, German historian Heinrich von Sybel published his History of the Crusades, a critical study of then-current Western sources. This initiated a series of similar works, such as those published by Heinrich Hagenmeyer between 1877 and 1913. As a result, the Western texts edited for the series Recueil des historiens des croisades have now been supplanted by superior editions.

Documentary sources include charters, diplomas, letters, privileges, and similar texts. Charters recording legal transactions such as sale or gift of property, or concession of rights are the most common documentary source from the Middle Ages. A sizeable number remain that were issued by crusaders. These include records of fund-raising transactions and pious donations. As such they inform historians on the financing of crusades, the motivations, and states of mind as well as family crusading traditions. They are of fundamental importance in the study of Crusading in the Outremer, Greece, and the Baltic region. Particularly the collections of charters related to military orders and ecclesiastical institutions. Although many letter do not survive, they are referred to in the narrative sources. Correspondence includes diplomatic and private missives, papal bulls proclaiming and regulating crusades including the crusaders' spiritual and temporal privileges and appeals for military assistance. Examples of treaties and contracts such as the 1190 treaty of Adrianople between Frederick Barbarossa and Byzantium during the Third Crusade, the Treaty of Venice and the Treaty of Christburg provide information on the organisation and outcomes of many crusades. In addition, historians utilise sermons, law codes, genealogies, financial records, the rules and customs of military orders, and inscriptions. Crusading narrative sources are widely available in good editions, but other sources are much less accessible.

== Medieval Western sources ==
When the Crusades began, most western primary sources were written in Latin and this remained the case for official documents until the end of the Middle Ages. However, from the late 12th century, individual eyewitness narratives were often captured in vernacular languages, including French, Occitan, English, German, and Dutch. Considerable information on the Crusading movement is recorded in general histories, or those devoted to specific cities and regions, while there are in addition large numbers of chronicles, histories, and biographies specifically devoted to crusading. The First Crusade produced elaborate and engaging narratives written by participants conscious of their involvement in an unprecedented event whose success or failure was derived from divine intervention. The relative failure of subsequent expeditions led to considerable variations in coverage and quality of those relating to later crusades.

=== Western sources of the First Crusade and the Crusade of 1101 ===
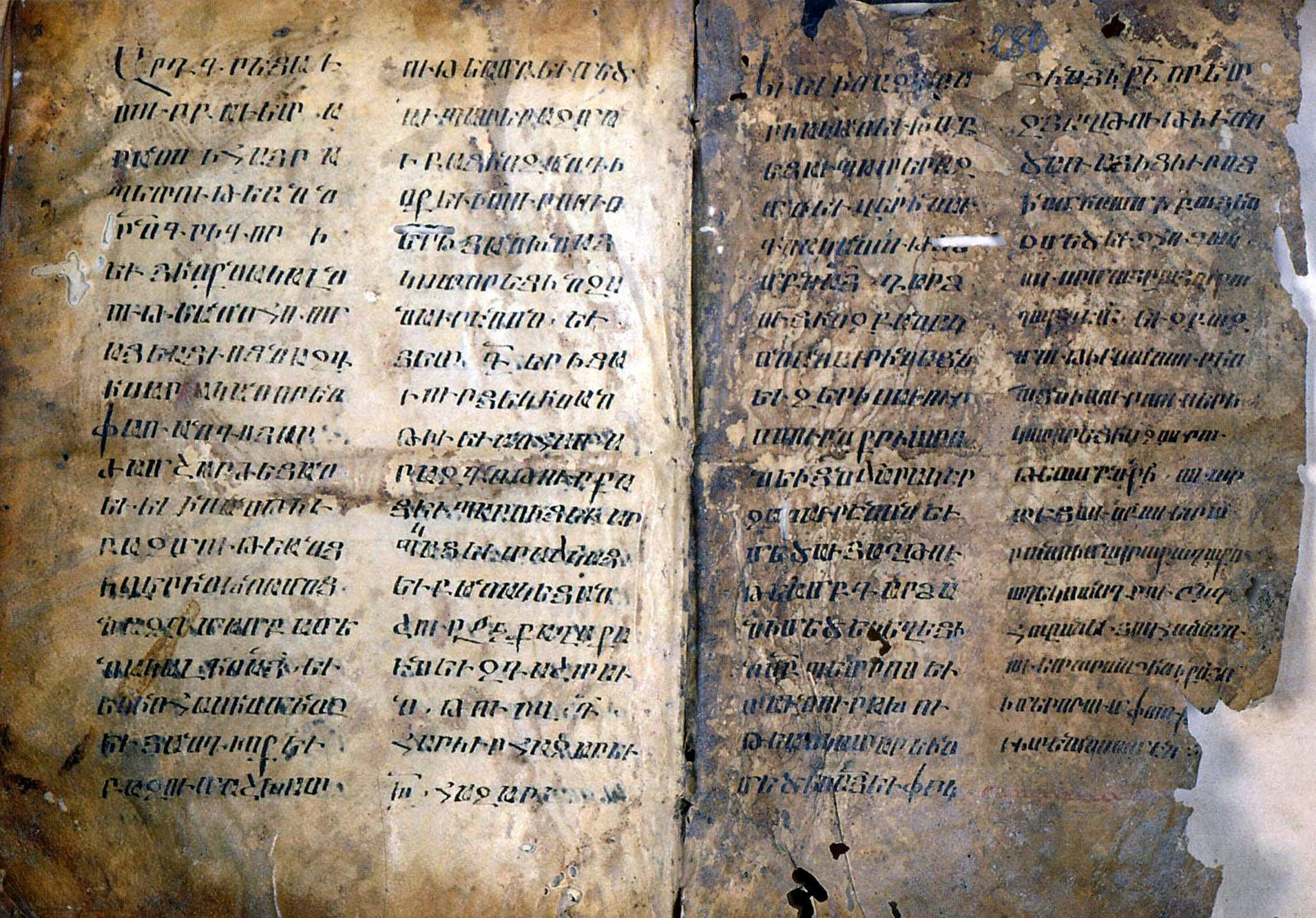
The first known mention of the Frankish conquest of Jerusalem, in an Armenian colophon written in 1099

The description and interpretation of crusading began soon after the taking of Jerusalem in 1099 and the decade of consolidation that followed. New campaigns in the 12th century utilised the images and morality of the first expedition for propaganda purposes. Travelling with different contingents and therefore offering different perspectives, three participating clerics wrote in Latin about the First Crusade and the Crusade of 1101: the anonymous author of Gesta Francorum, Raymond of Aguilers, and Fulcher of Chartres. There is some connectivity, Raymond and Fulcher both appear to refer to Gesta Francorum. Additionally, Peter Tudebode and Historia Belli Sacri reworked Gesta and it was completely rewritten in three versions by French Benedictine monks in the early 12th century:

- Guibert of Nogent retitled his work Dei Gesta per Francos offering some unique information.
- Baldric of Dol provided stylistic change and is the source for the accounts given by the Anglo-Norman monk Orderic Vitalis who provides details from oral sources and biographical detail about Norman participants.
- Robert the Monk from Rheims, was a conservative adapter but widely influential and copied. The original Latin version exists in more than 120 manuscripts, and more than four German translations from the later Middle Ages. Its influence can be seen in the works of Henry of Huntingdon and Gilo of Paris.

Other chroniclers wrote accounts early in the century, such as the German Ekkehard of Aura and Genoese Caffaro, both who were in the Outremer by 1101. Ralph of Caen who arrived in 1108, wrote the Gesta Tancredi, extant in a single manuscript and written in idiosyncratic Latin about the exploits of Tancred, Prince of Galilee. Texts such as Gesta Francorum presented a view of crusading written from a French, Benedictine and Papalist perspective which emphasised the importance of military might and attributed success and failure to God's will. The German cleric Albert of Aachen wrote the longest and most detailed account of the First Crusade and of the following twenty years, without travelling to Outremer. One advantage of his work, Historia Iherosolimitana is that it informs on the instigation and preaching of the crusade in the Rhineland, the preacher Peter the Hermit, the People's Crusade and the massacres of the Jews in the Rhineland cities. This work provided the only significant challenge to the Papalist, northern French tradition and gained increasing importance before the end of the century, when the cosmopolitan Jerusalemite William of Tyre expanded on Albert's writing. William's Chronicon was written in Outremer using a wealth of earlier materials and became the standard historical account of the Crusades for several centuries, until being questioned by historians in the 19th century. The challenge presented by the sources is illustrated by two vernacular accounts of the First Crusade:

- Zimmern Chronicle is now thought to be a 16th century fake.
- Chanson d'Antioche, although composed at the end of the 12th century contains later additions that cannot be differentiated.

The First Crusade is also evidenced in a small collection of letters from participants to the west including the Laodikeia Letter sent by the leaders of the crusade to the pope in the Autumn of 1099, from Anselm IV, archbishop of Milan, and Stephen of Blois

=== Sources from the Outremer ===
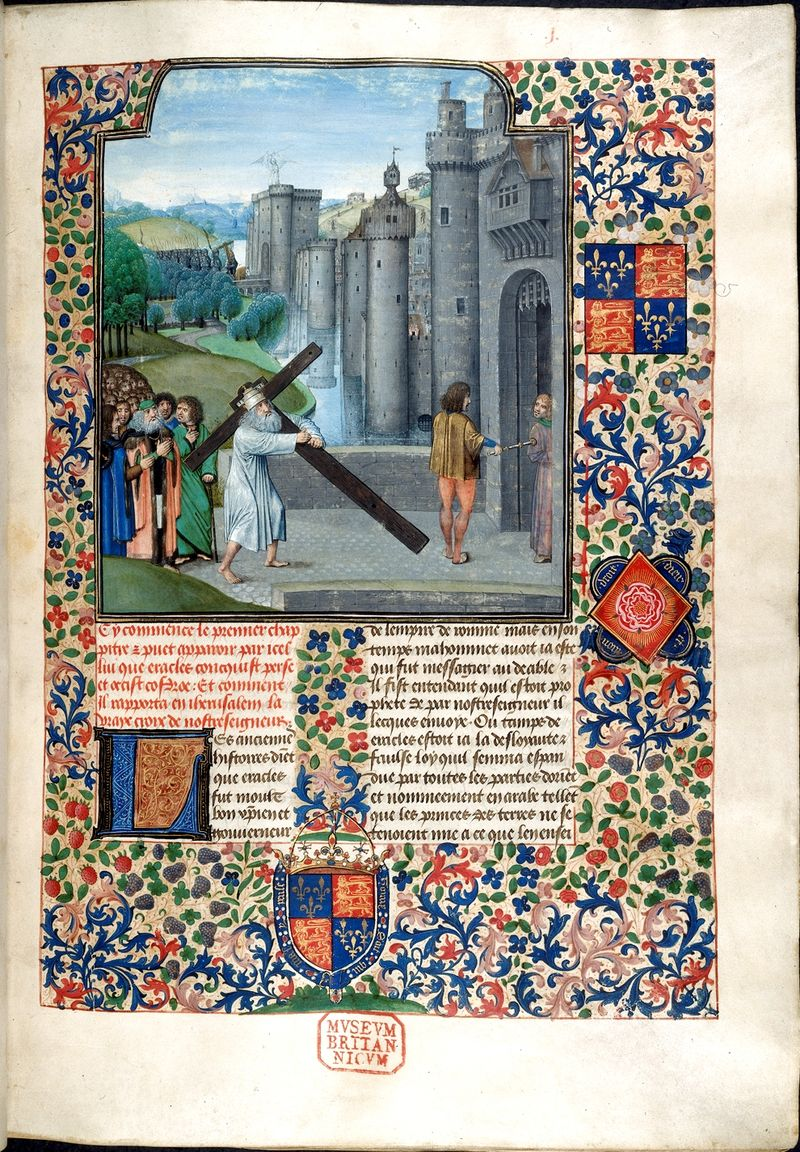
The emperor Heraclius carrying the True Cross into Jerusalem, from British Library MS Royal 15 E. i (15th century).

Fulcher missed the culminating events of the First Crusade because he accompanied Baldwin of Boulogne to Edessa. When Baldwin became king of Jerusalem in 1100, Fulcher joined him and for the next twenty-seven years wrote the best-informed account of the kingdom. Between 1114 and 1122 Walter the Chancellor documented of the wars fought by Antioch against the Turks of northern Syria in Bella Antiochena. Both texts were used by William of Tyre, whose Chronicon deals with the history of the region from Emperor Heraclius until 1184.

William was translated into French and continuators' accounts are important for the end of the first kingdom of Jerusalem (1099–1187) and the 13th century. These include:

- Eracles— written in France in Old French, this is an interrelated collection.
- Chronique d'Ernoul—written in the Outremer

The Battle of Hattin and Saladin's conquest are covered by the short but detailed Libellus de expugnatione Terrae Sanctae per Saladinum expeditione, and two works by Peter of Blois Passio Reginaldi and Conquestio de dilatione vie Ierosolimitane, alongside more general works.

Archives were lost with the loss of territory to Saladin in 1187 and the final collapse of Outremer in 1291. The travel tales by pilgrims such as John of Würzburg, Saewulf, and Nikulás of Munkethverá provide details of topography and society, Assizes of Jerusalem give information on the legal system and Lignages d'Outremer provides family histories and relationships although its accuracy is questioned for the early 12th century. Gestes des Chiprois is the only surviving eyewitness account of the end of the Crusader States. It forms the basis of an account by Marino Sanuto the Elder. Other accounts, such as the anonymous De excidio urbis Acconis Thaddeus of Naples's Hystoria de desolacione civitatis Acconensis accuse the Acre garrison of cowardice. Little written evidence survives from the county of Edessa but much more from the kings of Jerusalem, the princes of Antioch, the counts of Tripol and the lordship of Joscelin III of Courtenay. The military orders; the Church of the Holy Sepulchre; and the Abbey of Saint Mary of the Valley of Jehosaphat provide surviving documents and letters that survive. Most are not yet available in full-text versions and the reliance is still on the digest provided by Reinhold Röhricht in his Regesta Regni Hierosolymitani at the end of the 19th century.

=== Late 12th-century sources ===
The Second Crusade's failure resulted in fewer sources. Three narratives exists: Odo of Deuil's De Ludovici VII profectione in Orientem, Sugar's Life of Louis VII, and Otto of Freising's Gesta Friderici. William of Tyre was absent from the Levant, but sought information to explain the failure. Historians now consider that, during this period, crusading expanded to include fighting the pagan Slavs in northern Europe, and the Moors in the Iberian Peninsula which is recorded in De expugnatione Lyxbonensi and the work known variously as theTeutonic Source or Lisbon Letter. The papal master-plan against Slavs east of the river Elbe has Helmold of Bosau's account. The Third Crusade is more celebrated because of the involvement of Richard I of England and its relative success. Itinerarium peregrinorum et Gesta Regis Ricardi has a contested relationship with the "Latin Continuation" of William of Tyre. Ambroise claimed to be an eyewitness leaving long poem in Old French. Informative Anglo-Norman writers include:

- Roger of Howden who was with the fleet to Outremer and returned in 1191.
- Richard of Devizes had a source who journeyed as far as Sicily.
- Ralph de Diceto had a chaplain on the expedition.
- Ralph of Coggeshall names his informants.
- William of Newburgh, was well-informed, but may have used the "Latin Continuation."

Only Gesta Philippi Augusti of Rigord provides the French perspective. German chroniclers recorded the journey of Emperor Frederick I until his death including the Historia de expeditione Friderici imperatoris supposedly by Ansbert. A monk from the Norwegian monastery of Tønsberg records the voyage of a Danish- Norwegian fleet in Historia de Profectione Danorum in Hierosolymam. Narratio de primordiis ordinis Theutonici describes the foundation of the German hospital at Acre that became the Teutonic Order.

=== 13th–15th-century sources ===
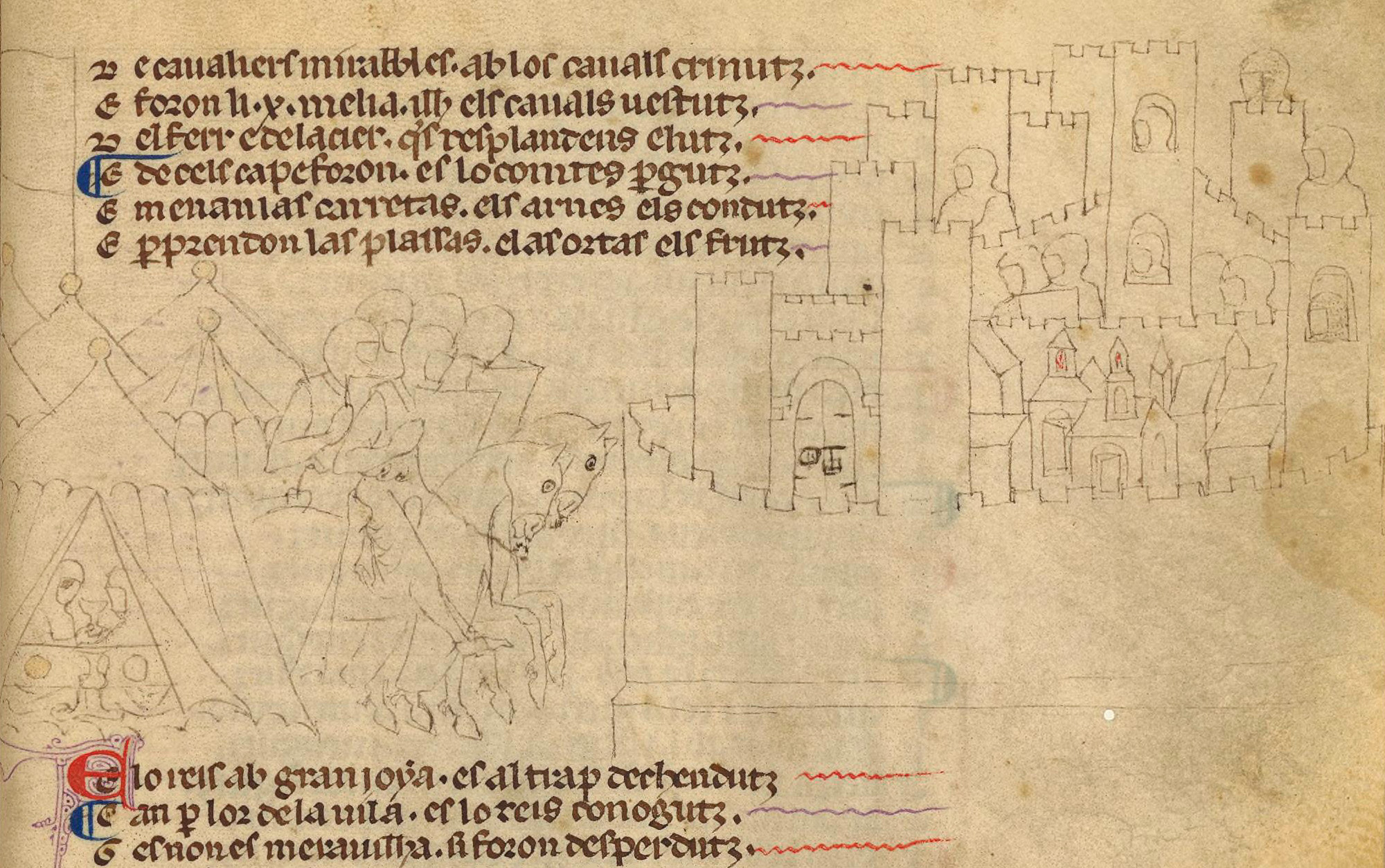
Louis VIII of France capturing Marmande, from the sole surviving manuscript of the Song of the Albigensian Crusade

Geoffrey of Villehardouin's Conquête de Constantinople is an authoritative, detailed and firsthand "top-down" account of the Fourth Crusade (1202–1204) and Frankish Greece. Robert of Clari's similarly titled work adds a counterpoint from the lower orders but it is partial and unreliable while being occasionally a useful correction. These two works are complemented by the anonymous probably Rhineland Devastatio Constantinopolitana illustrating the disillusionment of poorer crusaders. The triumphal return of crusaders and their loot is covered in three sources:

- Gunther of Pairis's apologia for his patron Abbot Martin.
- The Anonymous of Halberstadt's defence of his bishop Conrad of Krosigk.
- The Anonymous of Soissons's account of relics brought to his church

Gesta Innocentii III is an uncritical biography of the pope. Accounts of the Latin settlement in the Empire of Constantinople and Frankish Greece are limited. Villehardouin's account was continued by Henry of Valenciennes. The Chronicle of the Morea is the key source for Frankish central and southern Greece in the 13th and the 14th fourteenth centuries and Assises de Romanie evidence legal systems.

Three works document the Albigensian Crusade, from 1209 until 1219, against the Cathars of southern France:

- Peter of Vaux-de-Cernay, nephew of the bishop of Carcassonne, witnessed many of the events he details in Historia Albigensis. The work presents the view of the crusaders and effectively ends on the death of Simon de Montfort, 5th Earl of Leicester
- Song of the Albigensian Crusade or Chanson de la Croisade albigeoise from 1218 and written in vernacular French by William of Tudela who supported the papacy and an anonymous writer who wholeheartedly did not. It is an entertainment but matches Peter's work when describing the same events except in that Simon de Montfort is depicted as a villain.
- The Chronica of Guillaume de Puylaurens, a southerner and notary for the Inquisition includes brief coverage while covering the period between 1146 and 1272.

The largely poor and uneducated participants in popular expeditions such as the 1212 Children's Crusade and the 1251 and 1320 Shepherds’ Crusades did not produce specific records, although there are some sketchy and elliptical narrative sources. Oliver of Paderborn's Historia Damiatana is the most useful account of the Fifth Crusade. There are other good sources such as the letters of James of Vitry and Alberic of Troisfontaines universal chronicle. The latter also informs on the Fourth and Albigensian Crusades. John of Joinville's life of Louis IX of France—Livre de saintes paroles et des bons faiz nostre saint roy Looÿs— is well informed on the crusade to the East in which John was a participant but less so on the crusade to Tunis in which he was not. Guillaume de Machaut's verse history La Prise d’Alixandre is the main source for the 1365 capture of the city of Alexandria in Egypt by Peter I of Cyprus. Chivalric biographies of Louis II, Duke of Bourbon—Chronique du bon Loys de Bourbon and of Jean II Le Maingre—Livre des Fais by Jean Cabaret d'Orville’s and an anonymous author provide information on the 1390 Mahdia Crusade, the 1396 Crusade of Nikopolis and expeditions to Prussia in 1384 and 1385.

The chronicler Saxo Grammaticus describes Danish crusades in the Baltic region, but Henry of Livonia is the most important source for the conflict in Livonia. Most narrative sources dealing with the Baltic Crusades were in High or Low German from associates of the Teutonic Order:

- The Livonian Rhymed Chronicle—Livländische Reimchronik
- Ältere Hochmeisterchronik,
- Chronicles of Nicolaus von Jeroschin, Hermann von Wartberge, Wigand von Marburg, and Johann von Posilge,

Another Latin narrative is the chronicle of a Teutonic Order priest Peter von Dusburg Additionally, there are unique source types from the military campaigns including records of payments to mercenaries and some 100 different Litauische Wegeberichte describing campaign routes against Lithuania, compiled from scouts and local informants. Other documents for both Prussia and Livonia, some only partly published, exist in the collection of the Prussian Cultural Heritage Foundation or Geheimes Staatsarchiv Preußischer Kulturbesitz in Berlin. At the end of the fifteenth century, a substantial chronicle on the Teutonic Order and the crusades in the Holy Land was written in Dutch: the Jüngere Hochmeisterchronik or Utrecht Chronicle of the Teutonic Order.

=== Recovery texts ===
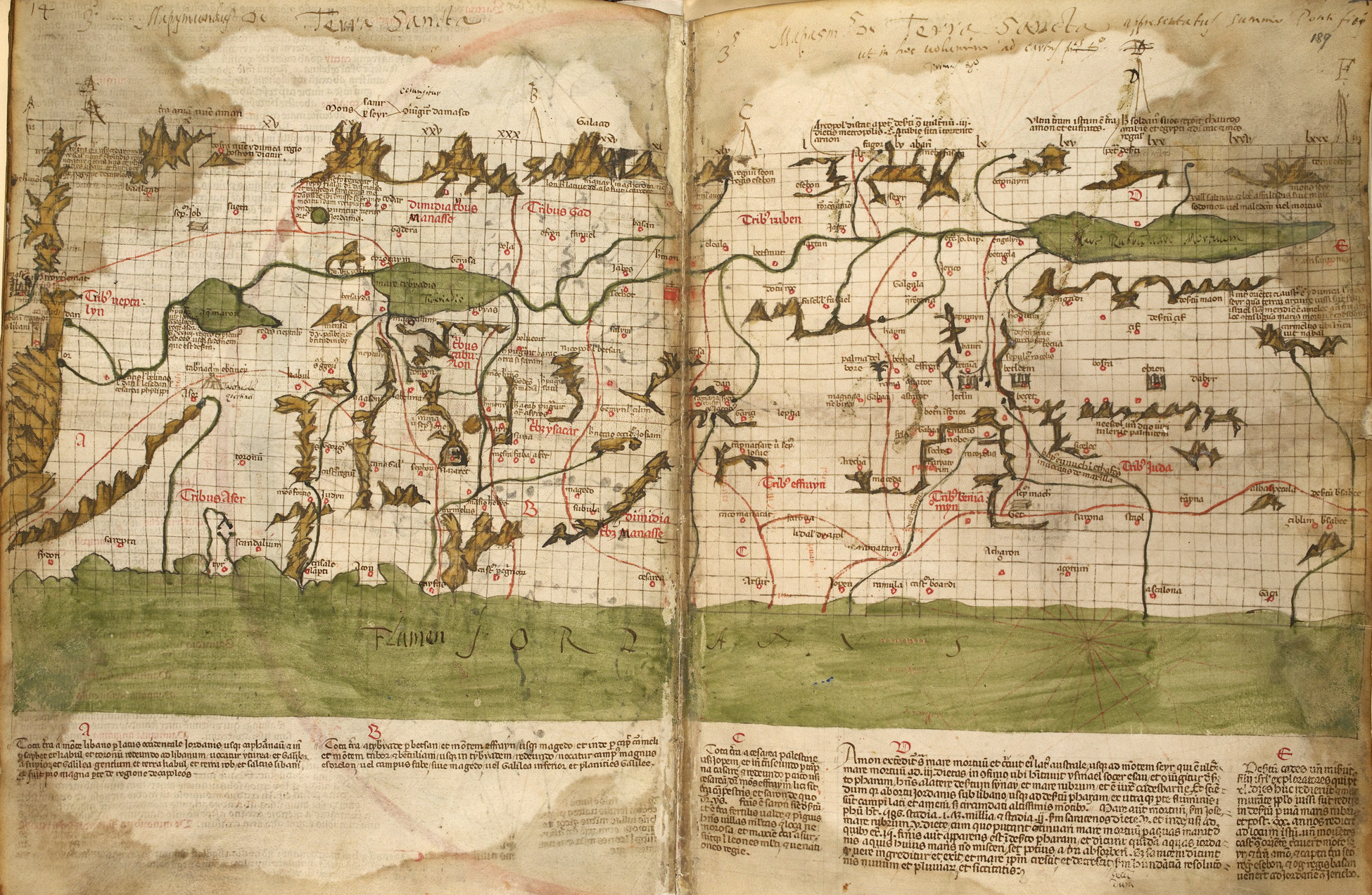
Map of the Holy Land by Marino Sanuto, drawn in 1320

After the loss of Syria and Palestine to the Mamluks and especially the fall of Acre in 1291, the writing of Latin crusade histories decreased, and a new genre of recovery texts developed. These were treatises or memoranda extolling projects and strategy for the recovery of the Holy Land or de recuperatione Terrae Sanctae. Writers such as Fidenzio of Padua, Marino Sanudo Torsello's Liber secretorum fidelium crucis, Philippe de Mézières, Bertrandon de la Broquière, Ramon Llull, and Pierre Dubois wrote and circulated such works in large numbers but varied widely in practicality and influence. Sanudo's sources included the 13th century Speculum historiale by Dominican friar Vincent of Beauvais.

In the 14th and 15th century the increasing threat from the Ottomans and the fall of Constantinople in 1453 prompted renewed interest in the crusades of the high Middle Ages from Renaissance humanists. Humanist historiography used refined rhetoric, idealising the First Crusade as an exemplar in propaganda favouring a European alliance against barbarous enemies. Flavio Biondo explicitly associated the loss of Constantinople with the Council of Clermont in the respected and popular Historiarum decades. Florentine chancellor Benedetto Accolti the Elder's De bello a Christianis contra barbaros gesto pro Christi sepulchro et Iudaea recuperandis on the First Crusade was closely linked with Pope Pius II's preparations for war. The First Crusade was refashioned into a figure of pride and nationalism in works based on Robert of Rheims and William of Tyre such as Historiarum rerum Venetarum decades by Marcus Antonius Coccius Sabellicus and the De rebus gestis Francorum libri by Paolo Emilio which was dedicated to Louis XII.

== Reformation-era literature ==
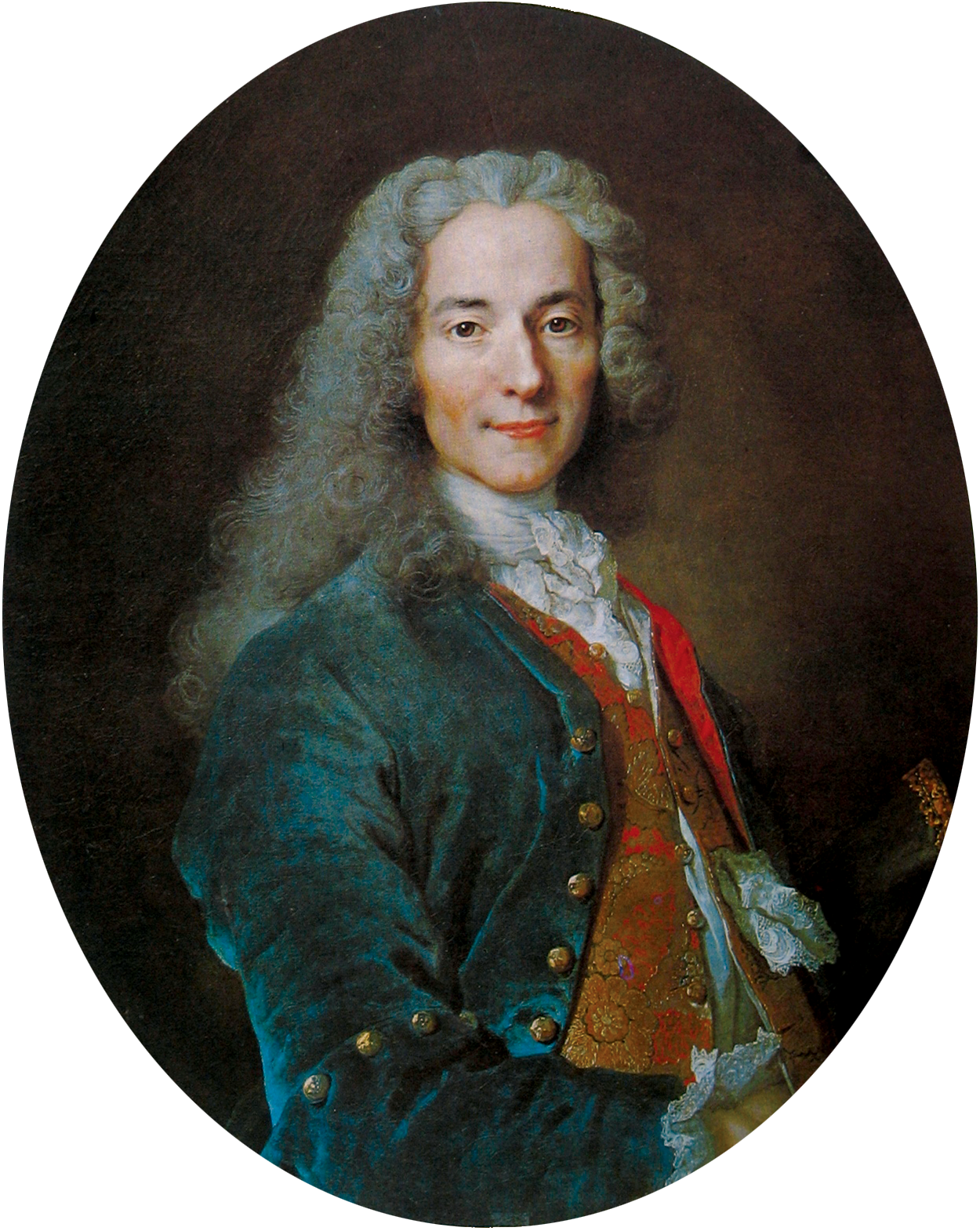
Voltaire, whose history used the Crusades and its impact as a way to critique French society

Attitudes toward the Crusades during the Reformation were shaped by confessional debates and the Ottoman expansion. In his 1566 work, History of the Turks, Protestant martyrologist John Foxe blamed the sins of the Catholic Church for the failure of the Crusades. He also condemned the use of the Crusades against those he considered had maintained the faith, such as the Albigensians and Waldensians. Lutheran scholar Matthew Dresser (1536–1607) extended this view. The crusaders were lauded for their faith but Urban II's motivation was seen as part of his conflict with Emperor Henry IV. On this view, the Crusades were flawed and the idea of restoring the physical Holy Places was "detestable superstition". Étienne Pasquier highlighted the failures of the crusades and the damage that religious conflict had inflicted on France and the church. It lists victims of papal aggression, sale of indulgences, church abuses, corruption, and conflicts at home.

In the early 17th century, reformist Catholic theologians like Alberico Gentili and Dutch humanist Hugo Grotius argued only wars fought for secular motives, such as the defence of rightfully held land, could be defined as "just"; those undertaken to convert others were inherently "unjust". They recast the Crusades as being undertaken in defence of Christendom, rather than demonstrations of faith; by avoiding the traditional focus on indulgences provided by the Catholic church, it created a perspective that could be shared by all Christians, both Protestant and Catholic. Divisions caused by the French Wars of Religion meant both Protestant and Catholic scholars like Jacques Bongars and Catholic Pasquier used the Crusades as a symbol of French unity. They presented them as primarily a French experience, rather than an alliance between European Christians, and praised the role of individuals while dismissing the Crusades themselves as immoral.

== Age of Enlightenment literature ==
Enlightenment writers such as David Hume, Voltaire, and Edward Gibbon used crusading as a conceptual tool to critique religion, civilisation, and cultural mores. They argued its only positive impact was ending feudalism and thus promoting rationalism; negatives included depopulation, economic ruin, abuse of papal authority, irresponsibility and barbarism. These opinions were later criticised in the 19th century as being unnecessarily hostile to, and ignorant of, the crusades.

Alternatively, Claude Fleury and Gottfried Wilhelm Leibniz proposed that the crusades were one stage in the improvement of European civilisation; that paradigm was further developed by rationalists. In France the idea that the crusades were an important part of national history and identity continued to evolve. In scholarly literature, the term "holy war" was replaced by the neutral German kreuzzug and French croisade. In 1671 while working for the Elector of Mainz, Leibniz wrote a proposal to Louis XIV for a French conquest of Egypt along the lines of the crusaders' Egypt strategy. The strategic intent was maybe to distract French aggression but the argument was France's role in the crusades aligned to its destiny, it would be for the benefit of Christendom, the Ottomans were decadent, and it would support French colonisation in the Near East. The proposal wasn't accepted, in the words of the French ambassador to Mainz I say nothing about the schemes for a holy war: but you know that they have ceased to be a la mode since Saint Louis. However, the proposal was rediscovered and Leibniz's ideas regained currency in the run up to Napoleon's French campaign in Egypt and Syria at the end of the 18th century.

Gibbon followed Thomas Fuller in dismissing the concept that the crusades were a legitimate defence on the grounds that they were disproportionate to the threat presented. Palestine was an objective, not because of reason but because of fanaticism and superstition. William Robertson expanded on Fleury in a new, empirical, objective approach; placing crusading in a narrative on the road to modernity. The cultural consequences of progress, growth in trade and the rise of the Italian cities are elaborated in his work. In this he influenced his student Walter Scott.

== 19th-century Western literature ==
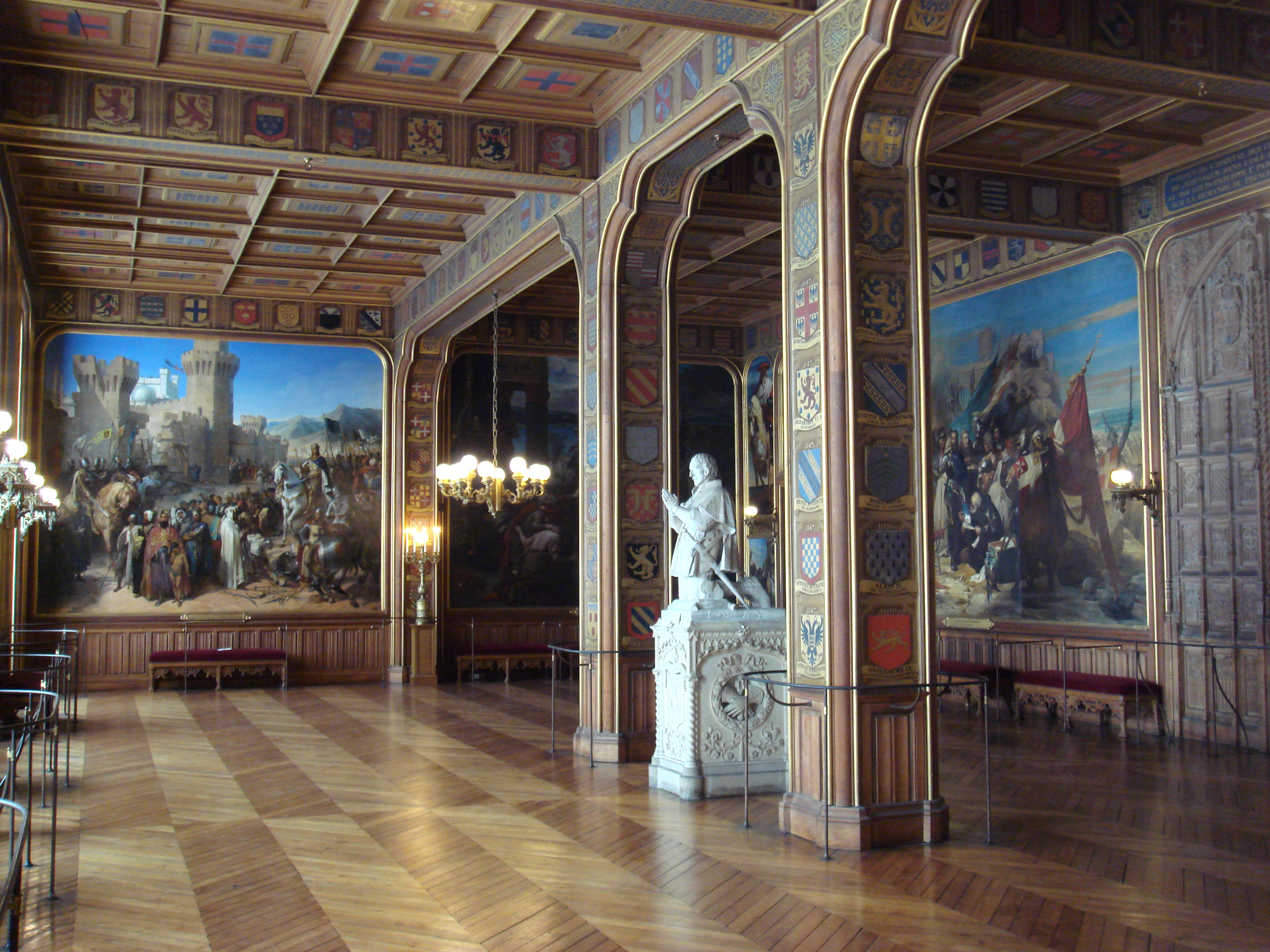
The Salle des Croisades, at Versailles; used to justify French colonial ambitions in the Eastern Mediterranean

Much of the popular understanding of the Crusades derives from the 19th century novels of Scott and the histories of Joseph-François Michaud. Scott published four Crusades-based novels between 1819 and 1831 viewing the Crusades as incursions of glamorous but uneducated western Europeans into a superior civilisation. Michaud published his influential Histoire des croisades between 1812 and 1822 depicting the Crusades as glorious instruments of French nationalism and proto-imperialism. These incompatible views agreed only on the idea that a crusade was defined by its opposition to Islam. Scott's description of an inferior culture attacking a more sophisticated one mixed with Michaud's proto-colonialist conviction. By the 1950s this established a neo-imperialistic and materialistic orthodoxy that remains the popular perceptions. The Romantics and conservative adherents of the European anciens régimes appropriated crusading imagery for their own political goals, downplaying religion to fit within a modern, secular context and presenting crusades as a counterpoint to liberal ideas of nationalism. Future Prime Minister of the United Kingdom Benjamin Disraeli showed a deep interest in crusading, touring the Near East in 1831 and writing a crusade novel in 1847, called both Tancred or The New Crusade.

Western historians have traditionally argued that the Muslim world showed little interest in the Crusades until the mid-19th century. Carole Hillenbrand suggests they were a marginal issue compared to the collapse of the Caliphate, while Arab writers often took a Western viewpoint in opposition to the Ottoman Empire, which suppressed Arab nationalism. In 1841, the first of 15 volumes of Recueil des historiens des croisades was published, based on original sources collected by the Maurists prior to the Revolution. Louis-Philippe opened the Salle des Croisades at Versailles in 1843, with over 120 specially commissioned paintings related to the Crusades.

== Modern Western historiography ==
French historians such as Emmanuel Guillaume-Rey, Louis Madelin and René Grousset expanded on the thinking of Michaud, espoused propaganda of the country's Mediterranean colonies, and provided a source of popular models that were criticised and dismantled when empires ceased to hold academic approval. Early modern period and Francisco Franco-era Spain presented a special case where nationalism and national identity could be projected onto the Crusades. The Spanish Catholic Church declared a crusade against Marxism and atheism, and in the following thirty-six years of National Catholicism, the idea of Reconquista as a foundation of historical memory, celebration, and Spanish national identity became entrenched in conservative circles. It lost historiographical hegemony when democracy was restored in 1978, but remains fundamental within conservative sectors of Spanish academia, politics, and the media when analysing the medieval period because of the strong ideological connotations. British historians took a less ideological approach compared with Spain, France, Germany and Italy.

Steven Runciman's literary three-volume work A History of the Crusades, published between 1951 and 1954, had the most significant impact on Crusades' historiography since Michaud. One reason is the elegance of the writing; Jonathan Riley-Smith quotes Runciman as saying he was a writer of literature, rather than an historian. As a historian of the Byzantine Empire, his approach reflected the 19th century concept of a clash of civilisations. Historian Thomas F. Madden considers that Runciman single-handedly crafted the current popular concept of the crusades, while many other academics now consider his work dated, sometimes inaccurate and open to challenge. The work is largely based on Ferdinand Chalandon's Histoire de la Premiere Croisade jusqu'a l'election de Godefroi de Bouillon, Gesta Francorum, William of Tyre, Byzantines such as Nicetas Choniates, Gestes des Chiprois and Grousset.

In the 1940s, Claude Cahen's La Syrie du Nord a l'epoque des croisades—Northern Syria at the time of the Crusades— established the study of the Outremer as a feature of Near Eastern history removed from the West. By re-examining legal practices and institutions, Israeli Joshua Prawer and French historian Jean Richard reshaped the historiography of the Latin East. A fresh constitutional history supplanted paradigms of the Latin East as a model feudal world. The 1970s Histoire du royaume Latin de Jerusalem revisited the Latin settlements in the East being and the idea of them being proto colonies. In The Latin Kingdom of Jerusalem: European Colonialism in the Middle Ages Prawer argued that Frankish settlement was too limited to be permanent and the Franks did not engage with the local culture or environment; it was therefore unlike the state of Israel. This agreed with R.C. Smail's influential 1956 work on crusader warfare. This directly challenged Madelin and Grousset and in turn Ronnie Ellenblum's 1998 Frankish Rural Settlement in the Latin Kingdom of Jerusalem modifies Prawar's model with more extensive rural Latin settlement.

Instigated by John La Monte of University of Pennsylvania, and later edited by Kenneth Setton, in the mid-20th century, the multi-volume and collaborative Wisconsin Collaborative History of the Crusades attempted to fill gaps in crusade knowledge with a great weight of useful material, maps, nomenclature, bibliographies and glosseries. However, its collaborative approach led to a long gestation between 1955 and 1989, a lack of coherence and contributions to the debates on the crusades that quickly became dated in the light of new research. In a 2001 article—The Historiography of the Crusades—Giles Constable attempted to categorise what is meant by Crusade into four areas of contemporary crusade study. His view was that Traditionalists such as Hans Eberhard Mayer are concerned with where the crusades were aimed, Pluralists such as Riley-Smith concentrate on how the crusades were organised, Popularists including Paul Alphandery and Etienne Delaruelle focus on the popular groundswells of religious fervour and Generalists such as Ernst-Dieter Hehl focus on the phenomenon of Latin holy wars. The definition of the crusade remains contentious.

Prior to the late 20th century it was assumed that what was meant by "crusade" and its scope was Christian attempts to recover Jerusalem. From the beginning of the Early Modern Period little reflection was given to the inclusion of other theatres of war. The German historian Carl Erdmann presented a significant challenge, theorising that crusading was a political ideology within Western society rather than a glamourised frontier conflict. In 1965 Hans Eberhard Mayer's Geschichte der Kreuzzuge—History of the Crusades— raised questions of the definition of crusading. Riley-Smith straddled two schools on the actions and motives of early crusaders. By 1977 he was a dominant influential figure in academic crusade studies and proposed a wider definition. The key to definition rested with papal authority. Riley-Smith's view that everyone accepted that the crusades to the East were the most prestigious and provided the scale against which the others were measure is largely accepted. But there is disagreement on whether only those campaigns launched to recover or protect Jerusalem that are proper crusades e.g., Mayer and Jean Flori. or whether all those wars to which popes applied equivalent temporal and spiritual were equally legitimate e.g., Riley-Smith and Norman Housley. These arguments fail to place what only became a coherent paradigm around 1200 into a context of Medieval Christian holy war argued by John Gilchrist e.g. Crusading was the result ecclesiastical initiative, but the church submitted to secular militarism in the early 13th century. For Paul E. Chevedden, the concept of crusading is not embodied exclusively in one form (e.g., the Jerusalem Crusade) but in the totality of crusading forms. This totality can only be grasped in the aggregate, in the many manifestations of crusading, not in a single Crusade. Only by looking at the Crusades in this way do the multiplicity, the diversity, and the heterogeneity of the Crusades cease to appear to be a contradiction of their unity and become instead a necessary expression of that unity itself. Following Chevedden's considerations, Paul Srodecki suggested to view the crusade as an evolutionary chameleon which only in this way could [...] survive within Latin Christendom up to the beginning of the early modern period and, during the Hussite and Turkish wars, continue to form an important ideological, rhetorical and thus both legitimistic and propagandistic instrument of the papacy as well as of the respective secular actors. Accordingly, today, Crusade historians study the Baltic, the Mediterranean, the Near East, even the Atlantic, and crusading's position in, and derivation, from host and victim societies. Chronological horizons have crusades existing into the early modern world e.g. the survival of the Order of St. John on Malta until 1798. In recent decades historians have deployed new approaches borrowed from gender studies and literary theory to examine the validity of narrative sources, developing insight on the experiences and representation of women within the context of the Crusades.

== Arabic and Muslim historiography ==
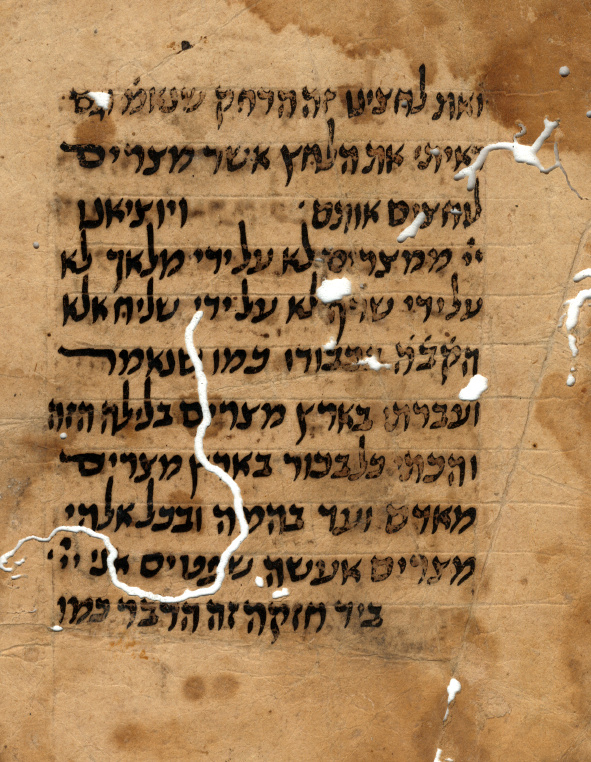
Fragment of a haggada from the Cairo genizah

Many Arabic sources have been lost, remain untranslated or are extant only in manuscript making it difficult to research without a knowledge of the language. The motivations of the authors must be considered as well as acknowledging the Christian concept of crusade was alien to medieval Muslims, who often viewed the crusaders as motivated by avarice. Few Muslim works consider the crusading phenomenon and crusades are often documented in larger narratives of events, mentioned occasionally and lacking detail.

Works belonging to the genre of Fada’il al-Quds (The Merits of Jerusalem), a category of Islamic sacred geography, should be viewed as a valuable yet virtually unstudied source for examining the memory of the Crusades in the Levant and Egypt. In the most prominent texts of this genre produced after 1291, the theme of the Crusades and the desecration of Islamic sacred spaces by the Franks played an increasingly significant role. By the late 15th century, notably in the writings of Shams al-Dīn al-Suyūṭī and Mujīr al-Dīn al-‘Ulaymī, a fully formed narrative regarding the Frankish invasion had emerged, centering on the struggle for Jerusalem and the figure of Saladin. This occurred at a time when mainstream Islamic historiography had not yet developed a comparable conceptual framework, and accounts of the conflict with the Crusaders remained merely components of dynastic chronicles, regional histories, and biographies, or were scattered across chronological narratives within works of universal history.

Mainly Muslim, mostly Classical, Arabic writing produced several genres during the crusading period, but there are also Arabic works written by Christians and Jews. Some sources from the Jewish communities of the time used Arabic written in Hebrew characters known as Judeo-Arabic such as the Cairo Genizah found in the late 19th century at the Ben Ezra Synagogue, Cairo. The genres include:

- Universal chronicles—the best known al-Kamil fi at-Tarikh or The Complete History by Ali ibn al-Athir. Local histories were similar, but about particular cities or countries. Ibn al-Qalanisi wrote The Continuation of the History of Damascus in the 12th century and Ibn al-Jawzi The History of Aleppo. Al-Athir also wrote a history of the Zengid dynasty, The Dazzling History of the State of the Atabegs. Jamāl al-Din Muhammad ibn Wasil wrote of the Ayyubid dynasty. Abū Shāma Shihāb al-Dīn al-Maqdisī covered both dynasties. Information on the patriarchs of the Coptic church of Egypt is related in Biographies of the Holy Patriarchs by unknown authors after Severus ibn al-Muqaffa.
- Biographies and Autobiographies,
- Religious Texts,
- Geographical Works and Travel Literature,
- Popular Folk Literature,
- Legal Texts and Treaties,
- Suffixed curses.

The Muslim world exhibited little interest in the Crusades as they were not considered significant events until the middle of the 19th century. One explanation is that they were considered a more marginal issue compared to the collapse of the Caliphate through the Mongol invasions and the replacement of Arab rule by the Turkish Ottoman Empire, who suppressed Arab nationalism for the following seven centuries. Carole Hillenbrand argued that Arab historians have often taken a Western viewpoint because they have historically been opposed to Turkish control of their homelands.

Arabic-speaking Syrian Christians began translating French histories into Arabic, leading to the replacement of the term "wars of the Ifranj" – Franks – with al-hurub al Salabiyya – "wars of the Cross". The Ottoman Turk Namık Kemal published the first modern Saladin biography in 1872. Kaiser Wilhelm's Jerusalem visit in 1898 prompted further interest, with the Egyptian Sayyid Ali al-Hariri producing the first Arabic history of the Crusades. Modern studies were driven by political purposes in the hope of learning from the Muslim forces' triumph over their enemies. Before Wilhelm's visit, Saladin's Western reputation for chivalry was not reflected in the Muslim world. He had been largely forgotten and eclipsed by more successful figures such as Baybars of Egypt. The visit and anti-imperialist sentiment led to the reinvention of his reputation by nationalist Arabs as a hero of the struggle against the West. Modern Arab states have sought to commemorate Saladin through various measures, often based on the image created of him in the 19th-century west.

Historical parallelism and the tradition of drawing inspiration from the Middle Ages have become keystones of political Islam encouraging ideas of a modern jihad and long struggle while secular Arab nationalism highlights the role of Western imperialism. Muslim thinkers, politicians, and historians have drawn parallels between the Crusades and modern political developments such as the establishment of Israel in 1948. Right-wing circles in the Western world have drawn opposing parallels by considering Christianity to be under an Islamic religious and demographic threat that is analogous to the situation at the time of the Crusades. Crusader symbols and anti-Islamic rhetoric is presented as an appropriate response, even if only for propaganda purposes. These symbols and rhetoric are used to provide a religious justification and inspiration for a struggle against a religious enemy. Madden argued that modern tensions are the result of a constructed view of the Crusades created by colonial powers in the 19th century and transmitted into Arab nationalism. For him the crusades are a medieval phenomenon in which the crusaders were engaged in a defensive war on behalf of their co-religionists.

== Bibliography ==
- Asbridge, Thomas (2012). The Crusades: The War for the Holy Land. Simon & Schuster. ISBN 978-1-84983-688-3.
- Chevedden, Paul E. (2013). "Crusade Creationism versus Pope Urban II's Conceptualization of the Crusades". The Historian. 75: 1–46. doi:10.1111/hisn.12000.
- Christie, Niall (2006). "Arabic Sources". In Murray, Alan V. (ed.). The Crusades: An Encyclopedia. Vol. I:A-C. ABC-CLIO. pp. 81–84. ISBN 978-1-57607-862-4.
- Constable, Giles (2001). "The Historiography of the Crusades". In Angeliki E. Laiou and Roy P. Mottahedeh (ed.). The Crusades from the Perspective of Byzantium and the Muslim World. Dumbarton Oaks. pp. 1–22. ISBN 978-0-88402-277-0.
- Davies, Norman (1997). Europe: A History. Pimlico. ISBN 978-0-7126-6633-6.
- García-Sanjuán, Alejandro (2018). "Rejecting al-Andalus, exalting the Reconquista: historical memory in contemporary Spain". Journal of Medieval Iberian Studies. 10 (1): 127–145. doi:10.1080/17546559.2016.1268263. S2CID 157964339.
- Gilchrist, John T. (1985). "The Erdmann Thesis and Canon Law,1083–1141". In Edbury, Peter W. (ed.). Crusade and Settlement: Papers Read at the First Conference of the Society for the Study of the Crusades and the Latin East and Presented to R. C. Smail. Cardiff: University College Cardiff Press. pp. 37–45. ISBN 978-0-90644-978-3.
- Hillenbrand, Carole (1999). The Crusades: Islamic Perspectives. Edinburgh University Press. ISBN 978-0-7486-0630-6.
- Housley, Norman (1992). The Later Crusades, 1274-1580: From Lyons to Alcazar. Oxford University Press. ISBN 978-0198221364.
- Koch, Ariel (2017). "The New Crusaders: Contemporary Extreme Right Symbolism and Rhetoric". Perspectives on Terrorism. 11 (5): 13–24. ISSN 2334-3745. Archived from the original on November 14, 2017.
- Madden, Thomas F. (2013). The Concise History of the Crusades. Rowman & Littlefield. ISBN 978-1-442-21576-4.
- Murray, Alan V.; Edgington, Susan (2006). "Western Sources". In Murray, Alan V. (ed.). The Crusades: An Encyclopedia. Vol. IV:R-Z. ABC-CLIO. pp. 1269–1276. ISBN 1-57607-862-0.
- Orth, Peter (2006). "Latin Literature". In Murray, Alan V. (ed.). The Crusades: An Encyclopedia. Vol. III:K-O. ABC-CLIO. pp. 717–720. ISBN 978-1-57607-862-4.
- Richard, Jean (1979). The Latin Kingdom of Jerusalem. Vol. II. Elsevier. ISBN 978-0444850928.
- Riley-Smith, Jonathan (2009). What Were the Crusades?. Palgrave Macmillan. ISBN 978-0-230-22069-0.
- Riley-Smith, Jonathan (2008). The crusades, Christianity, and Islam. Columbia University Press. ISBN 978-023-1-14624-1.
- Srodecki, Paul (2022). "Crusading on the Periphery in the High Middle Ages: Main Debates, New Approaches". In Paul Srodecki and Norbert Kersken (ed.). The Expansion of the Faith: Crusading on the Frontiers of Latin Christendom in the High Middle Ages. Brepols. pp. 29–52. ISBN 978-2-503-58880-3.
- Thomson, Robert W. (2001). "The Crusades through Armenian Eyes". In Angeliki E. Laiou and Roy P. Mottahedeh (ed.). The Crusades from the Perspective of Byzantium and the Muslim World. Dumbarton Oaks. pp. 71–82. ISBN 978-0-88402-277-0.
- Tyerman, Christopher (2006). God's War: A New History of the Crusades. Cambridge, Massachusetts: Belknap Press of Harvard University Press. ISBN 0-674-02387-0.
- Tyerman, Christopher (2006b). "Historiography, Modern". In Murray, Alan V. (ed.). The Crusades: An Encyclopedia. Vol. II:D-J. ABC-CLIO. pp. 582–587. ISBN 1-57607-862-0.
- Tyerman, Christopher (2011). The Debate on the Crusades, 1099–2010. Manchester University Press. ISBN 978-0-7190-7320-5.
- Tyerman, Christopher (2019). The World of the Crusades. Yale University Press. ISBN 978-0-300-21739-1.
