= Kolaković =

Kolaković (Serbian: Колаковић) is a surname. Notable people with the surname include:

- Aleksa Kolaković, handball player
- Azra Kolaković, Bosniak singer
- Božidar Kolaković, Yugoslav footballer
- Igor Kolaković, volleyball player
- Marko Kolaković, footballer
- Miloš Kolaković, Serbian footballer
