= Ti me više ne voliš =

Studio album by Donna Ares
- Released: 1998
- Recorded: Duisburg
- Genre: pop folk
- Label: Sani Records
- Producer: Džavid Ljubovci

Donna Ares chronology
Ti me više ne voliš (1998)	Sviraj nešto narodno (2001)

Ti me više ne voliš (You Don't Love Me Anymore) is the debut studio album by Bosnian pop singer Donna Ares. It was released in 1998 through Sani Records.

All of the songs were written by Ares and produced by her husband Džavid Ljubovci.

== Track listing ==
No.	Title	Length
1.	"Šta mi vrijedi" (What Does It Matter)
2.	"Ti me više ne voliš" (You Don't Love Me Anymore)
3.	"Nemoj lagati" (Don't Lie)
4.	"Kazna" (Punishment)
5.	"Vodi me" (Lead Me)
6.	"Meni nije žao" (I'm Not Upset)
7.	"Reci mi da znam" (Tell Me So I Know)
8.	"Budi kraj mene" (Be Next to Me)
9.	"Pustite me noćas" (Let Me Go Tonight)
10.	"Be My Friend"
