= Povratka nema =

Studio album by Donna Ares
- Released: 18 October 2011
- Recorded: 2010–11: Allmanah studio, Sarajevo; Sani Records studio, Bihać
- Genre: pop folk
- Producer: Džavid Ljubovci

Donna Ares chronology
Fantastična (2009)	Povratka nema (2011)

Singles from Povratka nema
- 1. "Ko si ti" Released: 30 September 2011; 2. "Vremena za nas" Released: 2 October 2011; 3. "Povratka nema" Released: 18 October 2011; 4. "Tjeram po svome" Released: 2011; 5. "Noći lude i kafane" Released: 2011; 6. "Godine" Released: 2011

Povratka nema (There Is No Return) is the seventh studio album by Bosnian pop singer Donna Ares. It was released 18 October 2011 through Hayat Production.

== Recording ==
Recording sessions for the There Is No Return took place at the Allmanah studio in Sarajevo and in Donna Ares's own recording studio Sani Records in Bihać.

All but two of the album's songs were written exclusively by Donna Ares herself; the title song was co-written by her mother Ajka and "Vremena za nas" ("Time for Us") was co-written by Radovan Vujadinović, a Montenegrin teenager and amateur songwriter who contacted Ares through Facebook with the lyrics.

== Singles ==
"Ko si ti" ("Who Are You") was the album's lead single. It was first uploaded to Ares' YouTube account 30 September 2011 and released officially on 3 October.

The title song was the official second single on 18 October 2011.

== Track listing ==
No.	Title	Writer(s)	Length
1.	"Ko si ti" (Who Are You)	Donna Ares	3:13
2.	"Vremena za nas" (Time for Us)	Donna Ares; Radovan Rale Vujadinović	3:02
3.	"Ćao mala" (Hello Girl)	Donna Ares	3:04
4.	"Noći lude i kafane" (Crazy Nights and Kafanas)	Donna Ares	3:53
5.	"Povratka nema" (There Is No Return)	Donna Ares; Ajka Kolaković	3:08
6.	"Tjeram po svome" (I March to My Own Beat)	Donna Ares	4:12
7.	"Dođe mi da opsujem" (Makes Me Want to Swear)	Donna Ares	3:59
8.	"Godine (pop verzija)" (Years (pop version))	Donna Ares	3:27
9.	"Ne vjerujem nikome" (I Don't Trust Anyone)	Donna Ares	3:21
10.	"Godine (dance verzija)" (Years (dance version))	Donna Ares	3:51

== Personnel ==
=== Instruments ===
- Faruk Pačenković – backing vocals (6),
- Miroslav Railić Miki – accordion (4, 9), keyboards (9)
- Džavid Ljubovci – guitar (4, 5, 6, 7, 8)
- Hamdija Mešić – guitar (6)
- Adnan Busuladžić– clarinet (4)
- Jasmin Hadžisadiković – tamburica (5)
- Donna Ares – piano (2, 6, 8)

=== Production and recording ===
- Džavid Ljubovci – arrangement (1, 3, 4, 5, 6, 7, 8, 9, 10)
