= Jackpot (Donna Ares album) =

Studio album by Donna Ares
- Released: 2004
- Recorded: 2003–04: Sani Records, Duisburg; Allmanah, Sarajevo
- Genre: pop folk
- Label: Song Zelex
- Producer: Džavid Ljubovci

Donna Ares chronology
Čuvaj Se Dušo (2002)	Jackpot (2004)	Nemam razloga za strah (2006)

Singles from Jackpot
- 1. "To mi nije trebalo" Released: 2004; 2. "Tjeram po svome" Released: 2004; 3. "Ubila me tvoja nevjera" Released: 2004

Jackpot is the third studio album by Bosnian pop singer Donna Ares. It was released in 2004 through the record label Song Zelex.

== Track listing ==
All of the song lyrics were solely written by Donna Ares herself and produced by her husband Džavid Ljubovci.

No.	Title	Writer(s)	Length
1.	"Jackpot"	Donna Ares
2.	"Podsjetnik na ljubav i sreću" (A Reminder of Love and Happiness)	Donna Ares
3.	"Ove godine" (This Year featuring (featuring Šerif Konjević))	Donna Ares
4.	"Ubila me tvoja nevjera" (Your Betrayal Killed Me)	Donna Ares
5.	"Glumac bez pokrića" (Actor Without Coverage)	Donna Ares
6.	"Da umrem od srama" (To Die of Shame)	Donna Ares
7.	"Kad sve propadne" (When All Else Fails)	Donna Ares
8.	"Tjeram po svome" (I March to My Own Beat)	Donna Ares
9.	"Nemoj da pogađam" (Don't Make Me Guess)	Donna Ares
10.	"To mi nije trebalo" (I Didn't Need That)	Donna Ares
11.	"Tjeram po svome (acapella)" (Don't Make Me Guess (acapella))	Donna Ares

== Personnel ==
=== Instruments ===
- Džavid Ljubovci – guitar (1, 3, 4, 5, 6, 7, 8, 10), electric guitar (8, 10)
- Mirzad Pervanić Migos – backing vocals (1, 4, 8)
- Donna Ares – piano (2, 8)
- Muhamed Šehić Hamić– accordion (3)
- Muamer Đozo – bass guitar (10)
- Amar Češljar – drums, percussion (10)

=== Production and recording ===
- Donna Ares – arrangement (1, 2, 4, 7, 9)
- Džavid Ljubovci – arrangement (2, 3, 4, 5, 6, 7, 8, 10), programming (2, 3, 4, 5, 6, 7), mixing, mastering
- Muhamed Šehić Hamić – arrangement (4, 9)
- Bruno Seletković– arrangement (9)

=== Crew ===
- Donna Ares – design
- Džavid Ljubovci – photography
