= Pázmáneum =

University in Vienna

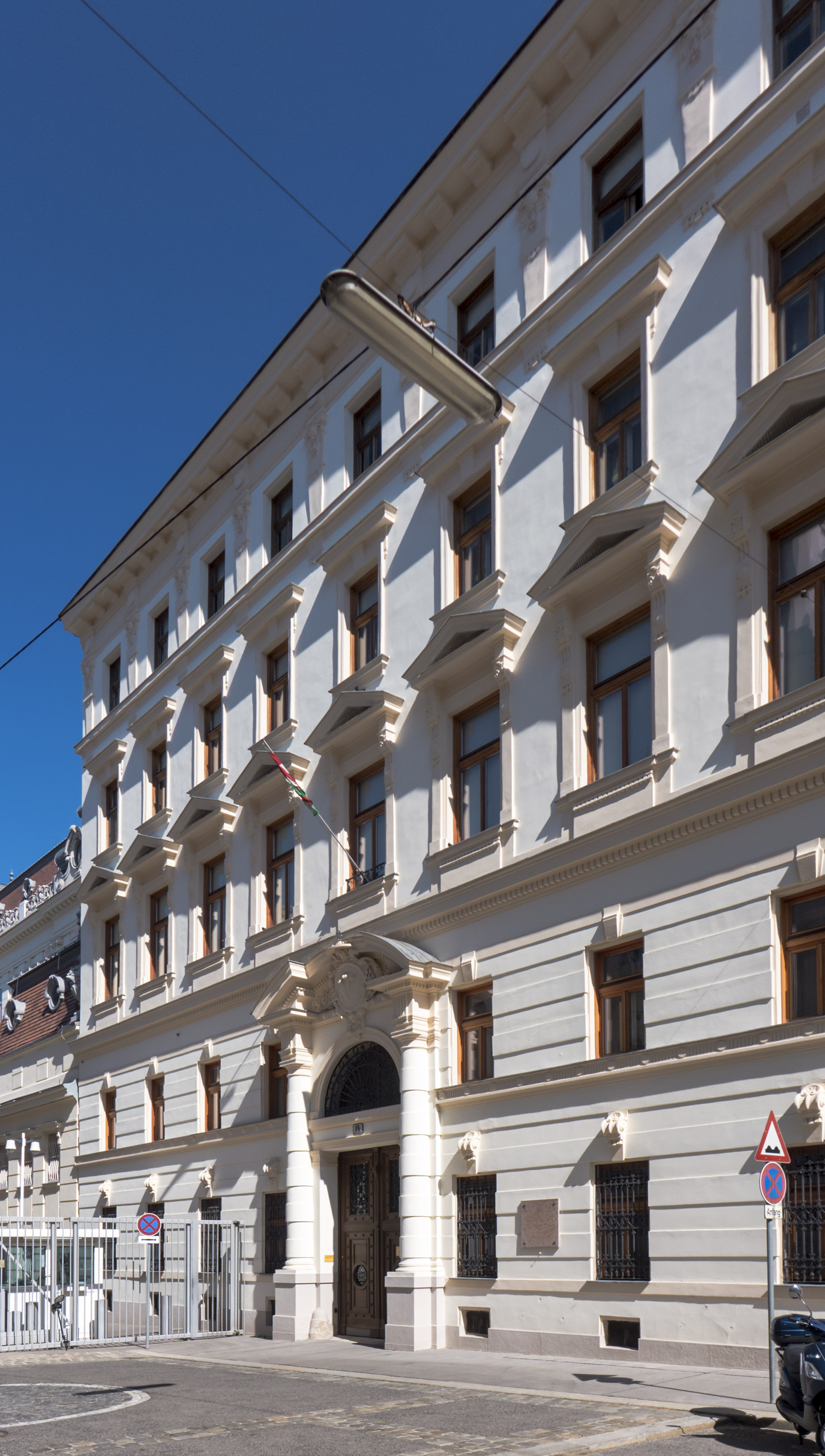
a view of Pázmáneum university

For other universities with similar names, see Pázmáneum (disambiguation)

The Pázmáneum (in Latin Collegium Pazmanianum) is a university in Vienna, founded in 1619 by Péter Pázmány as a seminary for Hungarian theological candidates, and it was confirmed by Pope Urban VIII in December 1623.

== History ==
In 1618, Péter Pázmány, Archbishop of Esztergom purchased a Viennese building for the Pázmáneum with his personal funds. He signed the institute's founding document in January 1619. However, due to the war between Gabriel Bethlen and Ferdinand II, the opening of the Pázmáneum was delayed until May 1624.

In March 1901, Franz Joseph visited the institute. After the First World War, the disintegration of Austria-Hungary created a peculiar situation for the Pázmáneum, as Hungarian students found it difficult to get to Vienna from across the border.

In October 1971, Cardinal József Mindszenty came to the Pázmáneum, where he spent the last years of his life. It was from here that he began his pastoral visits which he tirelessly pursued until his death. Many people called on Mindszenty in the Pázmáneum: on several occasions, he was visited by Cardinal Franz König, Opilio Rossi, the apostolic nuncio, and Otto von Habsburg. At the end of April 1975, weak and sick, he returned from a long South American pastoral trip. On 6 May he was taken for life-saving surgery to the Brothers of Mercy Hospital in Vienna, where he died.
