= Fantastična =

Studio album by Donna Ares
- Released: 14 May 2009
- Recorded: 2008–09: Allmanah studio, Sarajevo; Sani Records studio, Bihać
- Genre: pop folk; pop; rock; Bosnian folk; house
- Label: BN Music; Hrkalović Production
- Producer: Džavid Ljubovci

Donna Ares chronology
Nemam razloga za strah (2006)	Fantastična (2009)	Povratka nema (2011)

Singles from Fantastična
- 1. "Aritmija" Released: 2008; 2. "Pare pare" Released: 2009

Fantastična (English: Fantastic) is the sixth studio album by Bosnian pop singer Donna Ares. It was released 14 May 2009 through BN Music in Bosnia and Herzegovina and Hrkalović Production in Serbia. The album was successful and broke sales records within the first weeks of its release.

The album contained an eclectic mix of pop, folk, rock and house music. Many listeners likened the style of several of the songs to the 1980s music of Lepa Brena.

== Track listing ==
No.	Title	Writer(s)	Length
1.	"Fantastična" (Fantastic)	Nino M	3:21
2.	"Ne vjerujem" (I Don't Believe)	Donna Ares; Hamdija Mešić	3:28
3.	"Zakletva" (Oath)	Dinko Zukanović; Hamdija Mešić	3:33
4.	"Želim da te gledam" (I Want to Look at You)	Džavid Ljubovci; Željko Došen	3:50
5.	"Život kratak, a godine duge" (Life Is Short, The Years Are Long)	Adi Iftić	3:54
6.	"Pare, pare" (Money, Money)	Donna Ares; Džavid Ljubovci	3:32
7.	"Crna hronika" (Black Chronicle)	Donna Ares; Bojana Radovanović; Jasmin Šiljdedić	3:54
8.	"Aritmija" (Arrhythmia)	Donna Ares; Bojana Radovanović	3:28
9.	"Furaj dalje" (Push Forward)	Amela Osmanović; Muhamed Šehić Hamić	3:19
10.	"Svjedok" (Witness)	Donna Ares	3:33
11.	"Kazna" (Punishment)	Donna Ares	4:20
12.	"Fantastična - D. F. K Re-Touch" (Fantastic (remix))	Nino M	3:51

== Personnel ==
=== Instruments ===
- Hamdija Mešić – guitar
- Almir Nezić – bass guitar (3, 6)
- Džavid Ljubovci – guitar

=== Production and recording ===
- Donna Ares – arrangement
- Džavid Ljubovci – arrangement, producing
- Nino M – arrangement
- Hamdija Mešić – arrangement

=== Crew ===
- Donna Ares – design
- Džavid Ljubovci – photography
