= Name of Hungary =

Hungary, the name in English for the European country, is an exonym derived from the Medieval Latin Hungaria. The Latin name itself derives from the ethnonym On-Ogur ("Ten Arrows" or "Ten Tribes" in Oghuric) for the Hungarian tribal federation that conquered the land in the 9th and 10th centuries. Medieval authors called the country Ungaria and later Hungaria, with the “H” added as Hungarians were thought to be descendants of the Huns. The Hungarians call themselves Magyars and their country Magyarország (ország means country in Hungarian). They also refer to their country as Hungária, though far less commonly.

== Name of the Hungarians and Hungary ==
=== Endonym of the ethnic group and country ===
Primary sources use several names for the Magyars/Hungarians. However, their original historical endonym—the name they used to refer to themselves in the Early Middle Ages—is uncertain. In sources written in Arabic, the Magyars are denominated Madjfarīyah or Madjgharīyah, for example by Ahmad ibn Rustah; Badjghird or Bazkirda, such as by al-Mas’udi; Unkalī by al-Tartushi, for instance; and Turk, by sources like ibn Hayyan. One of the earliest written mentions of "Magyar" endonym is from 810.

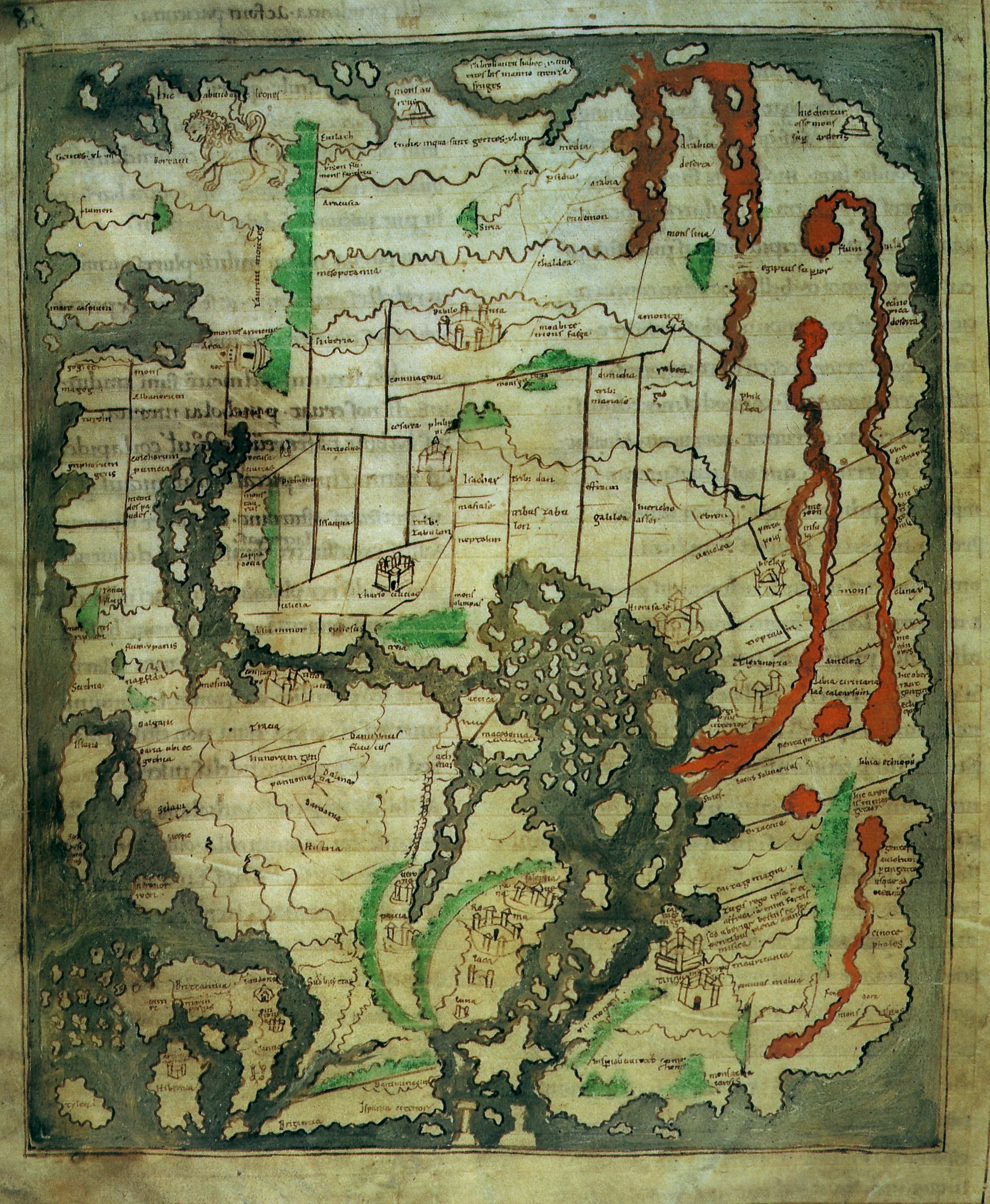
The Anglo-Saxon 'Cotton' world map (c. 1040) calls the territory of the Kingdom of Hungary: “Hunorum gens” = “Hun race”

The Hungarian endonym is Magyar, which is derived from Old Hungarian Mogyër. The name is derived from Magyeri of the 9th or 10th century (contemporarily Mëgyër), one of the 7 major semi-nomadic Hungarian tribes (the others being the Nyék, Tarján, Jenő, Kér, Keszi, and Kürt-Gyarmat), which dominated the others after the ascension of one of its members, namely Árpád, and his subsequent dynasty. The tribal name Megyer became Magyar in reference to the Hungarian people as a whole. There are many hypotheses on the origin of this name. The first element Magy is connected to the ethnonym of the Mansi (mäńćī, mańśi, and måńś), but no Proto-Ugric form can be reconstructed due to irregular vowel correspondences. The second element eri ("man", "men", and "lineage") is also of unclear origin; it was formerly considered to be cognate with Mari erge ("son") and Finnish archaic yrkä ("young man"), but this proposal has been rejected in more recent research.

=== European exonyms for Hungarians and Hungary ===
In early medieval sources, in addition to the Hungarians, the exonym Ungri or Ugri referred to the Mansi and Khantys also. It may refer to the Hungarians during a time when they dwelt east of the Ural Mountains along the natural borders of Europe and Asia before the Hungarian conquest of the Carpathian Basin in 895–6. The toponym Yugra or Iuhra referred to that territory from around the 12th century. Herodotus in the 5th century BC probably referred to ancestors of the Hungarians when he wrote of the Yugra people living west of the Ural Mountains.

In Byzantine sources, the Magyars are called Οὔγγροι Ungroi; Τούρκοι Turkoi, by Emperor Leo VI "the Wise", for example; and Σάβαρτοι άσφαλοι Savartoi asfaloi, such as by Emperor Constantine VII Porphyrogennetos. Written sources called Magyars "Ungarians" prior to the Hungarian conquest of the Carpathian Basin in 895–6 when they lived on the steppes of Eastern Europe, specifically: Ungri by Georgius Monachus in 837, Ungri in Annales Bertiniani of 862, and Ungari in Annales iuvavenses of 881.

The ethnonym Ungri is the Latinized form of Byzantine Greek Oungroi (Οὔγγροι). According to an explanation, the Greek name was borrowed from Old Bulgar ągrinŭ, which in turn comes from Oghuric On-Ogur (meaning "ten [tribes of the] Ogurs"), the collective name for the tribes which later joined the Bulgar tribal confederacy that ruled the eastern parts of Hungary after the Avars. The Hungarians probably belonged to the Onogur tribal alliance and it is very possible that they became its ethnic majority.

The Latin variant Ungarii used for them by Widukind of Corvey in his The Deeds of the Saxons of the 10th century is most probably patterned after Middle High German Ungarn. The Italians called the Hungarians as Ungherese, the country as Ungheria. When referencing the Magyars, the oldest Medieval Latin sources usually use Ungri, Ungari, late high medieval sources started to use a "H" prefix before the ethnonym: Hungri, Hungari, but some of the later high medieval sources call them Avari or Huni. The "H" prefix before the ethnonym and country name appeared in official Latin language Hungarian documents, royal seals and coins since the reign of king Béla III (r. 1172–1196). The German and Italian languages preserved the original form (without H prefix) of the ethnonym. The addition of the unetymological prefix "H-" in High Medieval-era Latin is most probably due to the politically motivated historical associations of the Hungarians with the Huns who settled Hungary prior to the Avars, Slavs and the Hungarians themselves.

==== The origin of the English ethnonym and country name ====
The English word "Hungary" is derived from Medieval Latin Hungaria.

== Hungarian sources ==
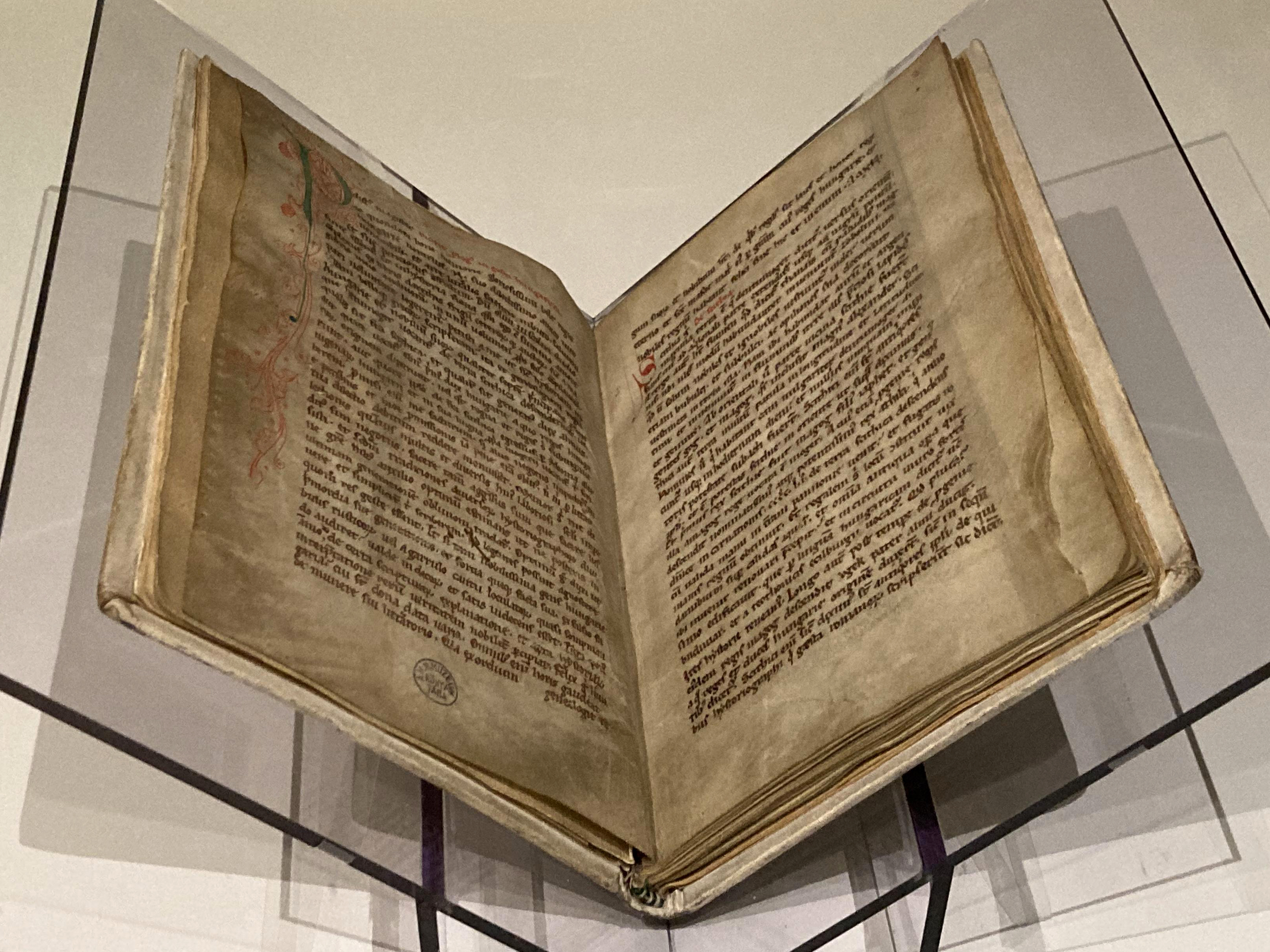
The Gesta Hungarorum

According to one view, following Anonymus's description, the Hungarian federation in the 9th century was called Hetumoger ("Seven Magyars"): VII principales persone qui Hetumoger dicuntur ("seven princely persons who are called Seven Magyars"), though the Chronicler refers to "seven leading persons" instead of a polity.

The genealogy of the kings of Hungary and of their noblemen: how the seven leading persons, who are called the Hetumoger [Seven Magyar], came down from the Scythian land, what that Scythian land was like and how Duke Álmos was born and why Álmos, from whom the kings of Hungary trace their origin, is called the first duke of Hungary, and how many realms and rulers they conquered and why the people coming forth from the Scythian land are called Hungarians in the speech of foreigners but Mogers [Magyars] in their own... The Hungarian people, most valiant and most powerful in the tasks of war thus originated, as we said above, from the Scythian people that is called in its own language Dentumoger. And their land was so full on account of the host of people born there that it was insufficient to sustain or keep them, as we said above. On account of this, the seven leading persons, who right up to the present day are called the Hetumoger [Seven Magyar], finding the physical constraints unendurable, having taken counsel among themselves to quit the soil of their birth, did not cease seeking in battle and war to occupy lands that they might live in. Then they chose to seek for themselves the land of Pannonia that they had heard from rumour had been the land of King Attila, from whose line Duke Álmos, father of Árpád, descended.

— Anonymus: Gesta Hungarorum

== Other sources ==
In Byzantine sources in Medieval Greek, the nation was denominated the "Western Tourkia". Hasdai ibn Shaprut denominated the polity "the land of the Hungrin" ("the land of the Hungarians") in a letter to Joseph of the Khazars of c. 960.

== Natio Hungarica ==
The Latin phrase Natio Hungarica ("Hungarian Nation") was a medieval and early modern era geographic, institutional and juridico-political category in Kingdom of Hungary without any ethnic connotation. The medieval "Natio Hungarica" consisted only the members of the Hungarian Parliament, which was composed of the nobility, Roman Catholic prelates, and the elected parliamentary envoys of the Royal free cities, which represented the city burghers. The other important - and more numerous - component of Natio Hungarica was the noble members of the county assemblies in the county seats, Kingdom of Hungary had 72 counties, (regardless of the real ethnicity and mother tongue of the noblemen, clergymen and city bourgeoisie of the kingdom). Those who had no direct participation in the political life on national [parliamentary] or local [counties] level (like the common people of the cities, towns, or the peasantry of the villages) were not considered part of the Natio Hungarica. This old medieval origin convention was also adopted officially in the Treaty of Szatmár of 1711 and the Pragmatic Sanction of 1723; remained until 1848, when the privileges of the Hungarian nobility were abolished; and thereafter acquired a sense of ethnic nationalism.

== Pannonia ==
Pannonia is a toponym derived from the name of the Pannonii (Παννόνιοι), a group of tribes that inhabited the Drava River Basin in the 2nd century BC. They were presumably Illyrian tribes that had been Celticized in the 3rd century BC. Julius Pokorny suggested an Illyrian etymology for this name, derived from a PIE root *pen- ("swamp" or "marsh"; cognate with English "fen"). The territory of the Pannonii in the Drava River Basin later formed the geographical center of the Province of "Pannonia" of the ancient Roman Empire.

Later, the territory of the medieval Kingdom of Hungary included that of former Pannonia, and Medieval Latin transferred the denomination of Pannonia to the territory of the Western parts of the Kingdom of Hungary. Further, the King of Hungary was given the title of Rex Pannoniae ("King of Pannonia") and Rex Pannonicorum ("King of the Pannonians").

The name "Pannonian" comes from Pannonia, a province of the Roman Empire. Only the western part of the territory (the so-called Transdanubia) of modern Hungary formed part of the ancient Roman Province of Pannonia; this comprises less than 29% of modern Hungary, therefore Hungarian geographers avoid the terms "Pannonian Basin" and "Pannonian Plain".

== Modern era ==
The Latin Regnum Hungariae or Regnum Ungarie (Regnum meaning "kingdom"); Regnum Marianum (meaning "Kingdom of [St.] Mary"); and simply Hungaria were the forms used in official documents in Latin from the beginning of the Kingdom of Hungary to the 1840s. Official documents in Hungarian used Magyarország, which also had preponderant use in the correspondence and official documents of Protestant Transylvanian Princes during the time for which they controlled not only the Partium but Upper Hungary, and at times even to Pressburg (Pozsony, contemporarily Bratislava). German Princes used the German Königreich Ungarn or simply Ungarn, including in diplomas in German or in both German and Latin for established German-speaking Hungarian residents of various municipalities, including Transylvanian Saxons, Zipsers, and Hiänzs, in the 14th century. Königreich Ungarn was also used from 1849 to the 1860s. The Hungarian Magyar Királyság was used in the 1840s and again from the 1860s to 1918.

The name of the Kingdom in other languages of its inhabitants was: Polish: Królestwo Węgier, Romanian: Regatul Ungariei, Serbo-Croatian: Kraljevina Ugarska / Краљевина Угарска, Slovene: Kraljevina Ogrska, Czech: Uherské království, and Slovak: Uhorské kráľovstvo.

The Italian Regno d'Ungheria ("Kingdom of Hungary") alone denominated the Free State of Fiume for its existence from 1920 to 1924, the City of Fiume (contemporarily Rijeka, Croatia, but still denominated Fiume in Hungarian) of which the Free State was predominantly comprised having been within the territory of the Kingdom from 1776 to 1920.

In and during the Austro-Hungarian Empire (1867–1918), Transleithania sometimes unofficially denominated the regions of the territory of the Kingdom of Hungary, but "Lands of the Holy Hungarian Crown of Saint Stephen" officially denominated the Hungarian territory of Austria-Hungary, it having had prior use.

=== Lands of the Crown of Saint Stephen ===
"Lands of the Crown of Saint Stephen" (Hungarian: a Szent Korona Országai) officially denominated the territory of the Kingdom of Hungary when it constituted part of the territory of the later Austro-Hungarian Empire. The Latin neologism Archiregnum Hungaricum ("Arch-Kingdom of Hungary") sometimes denominates these Hungarian territories qua part of Austria-Hungary, pursuant to Medieval Latin terminology.

=== Regnum Marianum ===
Regnum Marianum ("Kingdom of Mary") is a traditional Roman Catholic denomination of Hungary that honors the Blessed Virgin Mary as its symbolic sovereign. The name derives from the tradition that the first Hungarian king, King Saint Stephen I offered the Holy Crown of Hungary and the nation to her as he was dying, because he had no heirs to inherit it. Another traditional legend may also explain the honorary title: St. King Stephen I raised up the Holy Crown during his coronation in 1000/1 to offer it to the Nagyboldogasszony, the Blessed Virgin Mary, in order to seal a contract between her and the Holy Crown. After this, the Nagyboldogasszony was depicted not only as Patrona ("Patroness" saint) of the Kingdom but also as its Regina ("Queen"). This contract purportedly endows the Holy Crown with Divine power to assist the Hungarian Kings in ruling. The title is also part of the National Motto of Hungary: Regnum Mariae Patrona Hungariae ("Kingdom of Mary, the Patroness of Hungary", Hungarian: Mária Királysága, Magyarország Védőnője).

Regnum Marianum was often used to emphasize the predominant Roman Catholic Faith of Hungary. Some Hungarian religious communities also bear the name to express their intent to honor and imitate the life of St. Mary, including the Regnum Marianum Community, whose foundation in 1902 evidences the use of the phrase to denominate Hungary since at least that date.

== See also ==
- Lands of the Crown of Saint Stephen
- Pannonia
- Transleithania
- Yugra
