= Nemam razloga za strah =

Studio album by Donna Ares
- Released: 9 February 2006
- Recorded: 2005: Sani Records studio, Bihać
- Genre: pop folk
- Producer: Džavid Ljubovci

Donna Ares chronology
Jackpot (2004)	Nemam razloga za strah (2006)	Fantastična (2009)

Singles from Nemam razloga za strah
- 1. "Idi idi moja vilo" Released: 2006

Nemam razloga za strah (I Have No Reason for Fear) is the fifth studio album by Bosnian pop singer Donna Ares. It was released 9 February 2006 through Hayat Production.

== Track listing ==
No.	Title	Writer(s)	Length
1.	"Sve ti najbolje želim" (I Wish You the Best)	Al' Dino
2.	"Idi idi moja vilo" (Go, Go, My Fairy)	Osman Husičić; Dževad Husičić
3.	"Ne volim te više" (I Don't Love You Anymore)	Donna Ares
4.	"Ne vjerujem" (I Don't Believe)	Donna Ares; Hamdija Mešić
5.	"Trenutak života" (A Moment of Life)	Donna Ares
6.	"Prijateljica" (Friend (featuring Semir Cerić Koke))	Armin Šaković
7.	"Ja bih kao ti" (I Would Do It Like You)	Dino Muharemović
8.	"Nemam razloga za strah" (I Have No Reason for Fear)	Donna Ares
9.	"Puklo bi srce" (My Heart Would Explode)	Donna Ares; Džavid Ljubovci; Hamdija Mešić

== Personnel ==
=== Instruments ===
- Dalida Dikić – backing vocals (1, 2, 3, 4, 5, 6, 7, 9)
- Kenan Mačković – backing vocals (1, 2, 4)
- Željko Krišto – synthesizer (1)
- Muhamed Šehić Hamić – accordion, keyboards (2)
- Elvir Ramić – bass guitar (2), bass (9)
- Aladin Kečalović – drums (2, 9)
- Džavid Ljubovci – guitar (2, 3, 9), bouzouki(7)
- Sanel Kabiljagić – trumpet (2)
- Dinko Mujatović – accordion (8)

=== Production and recording ===
- Donna Ares – arranging (7)
- Hamdija Mešić – arrangement (4, 9)
- Nino M – arrangement (1, 5, 7, 8)
- Džavid Ljubovci – mastering, arrangement, mixing

=== Crew ===
- Donna Ares – design
- Džavid Ljubovci – photography
