= Donna Ares =

Bosnian singer-songwriter and musician (1977–2017)

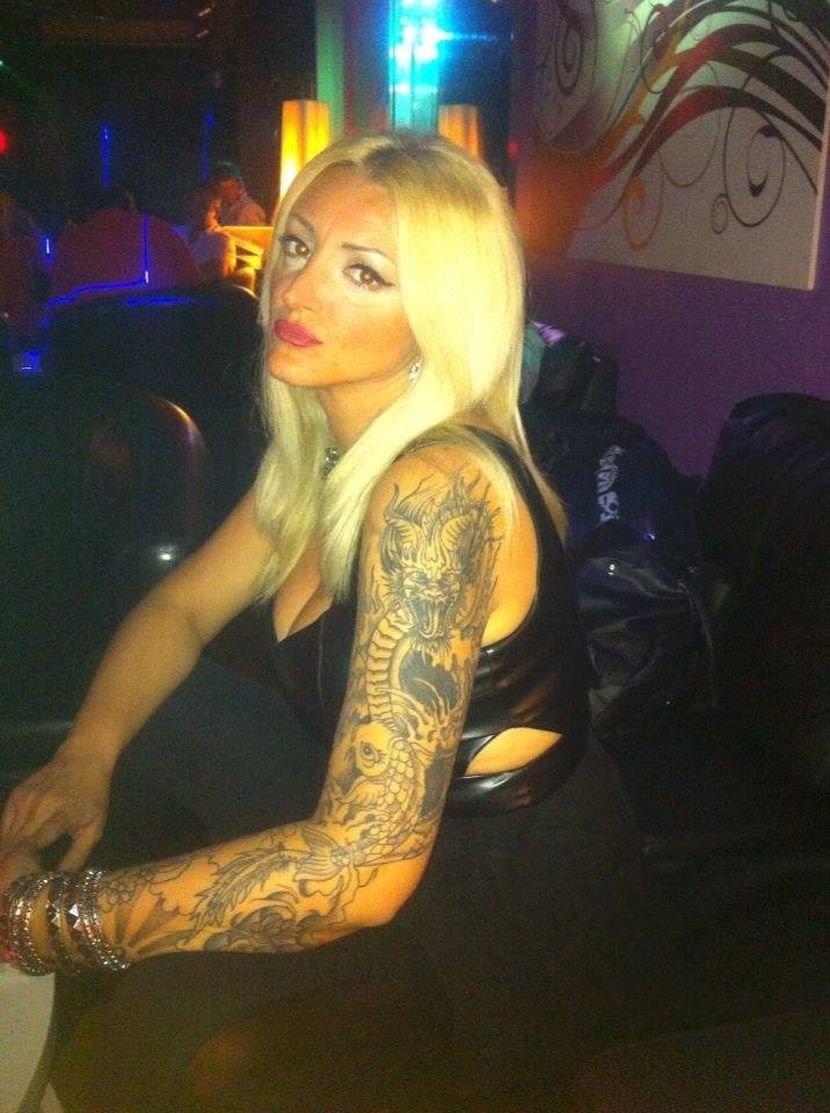
- Ares in 2013
- Born: Azra Kolaković; 1 January 1977; Bihać, SR Bosnia and Herzegovina, SFR Yugoslavia
- Died: 2 October 2017 (aged 40); Bihać, Bosnia and Herzegovina
- Resting place: Humci Cemetery
- Years active: 1997–2017
- Height: 170 cm (5 ft 7 in)
- Musical career
- Genres: Pop • pop-folk • turbo-folk • dance-pop • rock
- Occupations: Singer-songwriter; musician; author; music video director; painter; graphic designer; web designer
- Instruments: Vocals; piano; keyboards; guitar
- Labels: Sani Records; Nimfa Sound; InTakt Records; Hayat Production; Grand Production
- Formerly of: Camino Verde

Signature
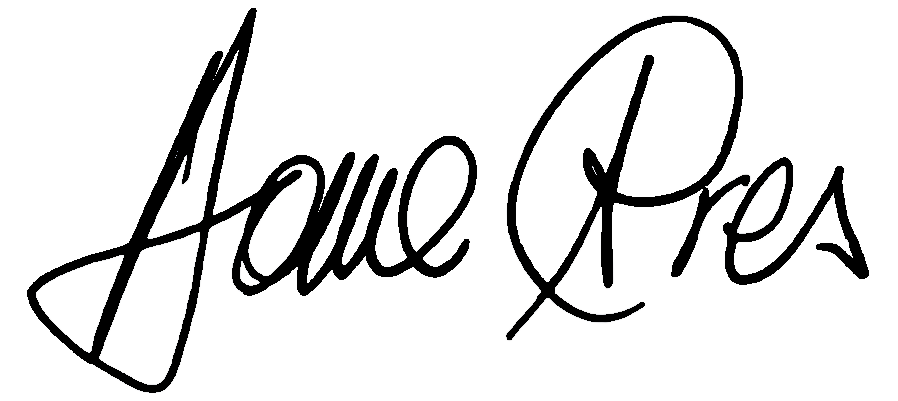

Azra Kolaković (pronounced [ǎzra kɔlǎkoʋitɕ]; 1 January 1977 – 2 October 2017), known professionally as Donna Ares, was a Bosnian singer-songwriter and musician. Dubbed the "Queen of the Balkan Party" (Bosnian: Kraljica Balkan žurke), she was one of Bosnia and Herzegovina's most commercially successful recording artists of the late 1990s and 2000s. During a career spanning nearly two decades, she released six studio albums and numerous hit singles, including "Sviraj nešto narodno" (with Halid Bešlić), "Ubila me tvoja nevjera", "To mi nije trebalo", "Idi, idi moja vilo", and "Suze moje plaču za oboje".

In addition to performing, Ares wrote and composed most of her own material, played several musical instruments, directed many of her music videos, designed her album artwork, and pursued painting.

In October 2014, Ares was diagnosed with metastatic cervical cancer. She continued recording music and performing while undergoing treatment and publicly documented her experience with the disease. In 2015, she published the autobiography Soba za nikoga ("A Room for Nobody"), describing her battle with cancer. The same year, she organized a charity concert at Sarajevo's Zetra Olympic Hall, with proceeds benefiting cancer patients through the Donna Ares Foundation.

Following several years of treatment in Bosnia and Denmark, Ares died in Bihać on 2 October 2017 at the age of 40. She remains one of Bosnia and Herzegovina's most prominent female recording artists and is remembered both for her musical career and for raising public awareness of cancer.

== Early life ==
Azra Kolaković was born in Bihać, Bosnia and Herzegovina, then part of the SFR Yugoslavia, to Bosniak parents, mother Ajka (née Čaušević), a piano teacher who works at a music school, and father Osman Kolaković (1944–2006), a pop-rock guitarist. She has a younger sister, Alma Tatlić (née Kolaković).

She began engaging with music as a child. She played the piano and, already in her childhood, as an instrumentalist during her studies at the Music School, she achieved numerous successes and awards at competitions across the former Yugoslavia. As a fifteen-year-old in 1992, she became a member of the group Camino Verde, with which she performed until 1996. The Bosnian War interrupted her ambitions and dreams of becoming a pianist, and due to the impossibility of continuing her planned studies in Vienna, she completely abandoned classical music and replaced it with commercial pop music. She made her first public appearance under the stage name Donna Ares at Dora 1997, Croatia's selection for the Eurovision Song Contest thus beginning a highly successful musical career as a prominent and award-winning singer, composer, and songwriter.

== Personal life ==
Ares was in a long-term relationship with Džavid Ljubovci, a musician who played in her band and arranged her songs. The couple lived together in Bihać. Two months before her death, she posted a crossed-out photo of the couple on Instagram with the caption "It's over, and I'm not sorry", which was widely interpreted as the end of their nearly 20-year relationship.

Ares had been feeling fatigued and had lost a significant amount of weight several months before being hospitalized in October 2014. She was diagnosed with cervical cancer with metastases.

In 2016, she moved to Denmark in the hope of recovering and starting a completely different life away from the public eye. In April 2017, Danish doctors informed her that she had approximately six months to live. After that, Ares returned to her hometown of Bihać, where she spent the remainder of her life with her mother and closest family members.

She died on 2 October 2017 while in a coma. She was buried on 4 October 2017 at the Humci cemetery in Bihać, next to her father, Osman Kolaković, who had died in 2006.

Following her funeral, Ares's burial, which did not follow traditional religious customs, drew criticism from some social media users.

== Philanthropy ==
In February 2015, Ares founded the humanitarian organization Donna Ares Foundation with the aim of providing assistance to individuals suffering from cancer and other malignant diseases in Bosnia and Herzegovina. The foundation organized various activities, including charity dinners and the sale of handmade items, to raise funds for patients' treatment. All proceeds from a concert held at Sarajevo’s Zetra Olympic Hall on 16 April 2015 were donated to the foundation’s account. Due to personal reasons, Donna decided to discontinue the foundation in February 2016.

== Discography ==
=== Studio albums ===
- Ti me više ne voliš (1998)
- Čuvaj se, dušo, ja sam tatin sin (2002)
- Jackpot (2004)
- Nemam razloga za strah (2006)
- Fantastična (2009)
- Povratka nema (2011)

=== Non-album singles ===
- 1997: “Zadnja noć”
- 2012: "Nema više"
- 2013: “Ko je jači” (Guest appearance on Soda Band song)
- 2013: “Obala suza” (Guest appearance on Derviš Eljazović’s song)
- 2013: “Žena zmaj” (feat. MC Sjena)
- 2013: “Godina Nova, a pjesme stare”
- 2014: “Suze moje plaču za oboje”
- 2014: “Señorita” (Guest appearance on Ady Ljubovci's song feat. MC Sjena)
- 2015: “Kreni! (Maslačak)” (feat. MC Sjena)

=== Live albums ===
- Live Mix I (Po želji!) (2000)
- Live Mix II (Sviraj nešto narodno) (2001)
- Live Mix III (2003)
- Donna Ares & Prijatelji (Live at Zetra, Sarajevo) (2015)

=== Compilation albums ===
- Megamix (2003)
- Nemoj da pogađam (2003)
- Best of Donna Ares (To mi nije trebalo) (2006)
- Deset godina sa vama (Live) (2007)
- The Best of Donna Ares (Želim da te gledam) (2010)

=== Video albums ===
- The Best of Donna Ares (1997-2006) (Video Collection) (2006)

== Videography ==
List of music videos, showing year released and directors
Title	Year	Director(s)
"Sviraj nešto narodno" (with Halid Bešlić)	2000	Donna Ares
"Šta smo ti i ja"	2002	Donna Ares
"Čuvaj se, dušo"	2002	Donna Ares
"Ja sam tatin sin"	2002	Donna Ares
"Šta je Sunce"	2002	Donna Ares
"Nemoj da pogađam"	2003	Donna Ares
"Noćas mi srce pati"	2003	Donna Ares
"Jackpot"	2004	Donna Ares
"Ove godine" (with Šerif Konjević)	2004	Donna Ares
"To mi nije trebalo"	2005	Donna Ares
"Idi, idi, moja vilo"	2006	Hayat Production
"Aritmija"	2008	Donna Ares
"Pare, pare"	2009	Željko Milanović
"Fantastična (Remix)"	2010	Donna Ares
"Ko si ti"	2011	Haris Rahmanović, Donna Ares
"Noći lude i kafane"	2012	Vision Production
"Tjeram po svome (Unplugged)"	2012	Irnes Čavkić
"Obala suza" (with Derviš Eljazović)	2013	HAMIRECORDS Production
"Žena zmaj" (with MC Sjena)	2014	Vision Production & Donna Ares
"Ko je jači" (with Soda Band)	2014	Vision Production & Donna Ares

== Filmography ==
Filmography of Donna Ares
Year	Title	Role	Genre	Notes
1997	Dora 1997	Herself	Television	Placed 12th.

== Bibliography ==
- Ares, Donna (2015). Soba za nikoga. Buybook.
