= Buybook =

- Company type: Private
- Industry: Mass media
- Founded: 26 December 1996; 29 years ago
- Headquarters: Sarajevo, Bosnia and Herzegovina
- Area served: Former Yugoslavia
- Number of employees: 260 (2024)

Buybook is a Bosnian publishing and bookstore company based in Sarajevo, Bosnia and Herzegovina. Established on December 26, 1996, by authors Goran Samardžić and Damir Uzunović, Buybook quickly established itself as a significant literary institution in the Balkans, focusing on publishing and distributing literature from Bosnia and Herzegovina and the broader regional context. Initially supported by the Open Society Institute in Bosnia and Herzegovina, Buybook became fully independent in 1998, relocating to its current store in Radićeva Street, Sarajevo.

== Publishing profile and contributions ==
Buybook's publishing efforts encompass various genres, including literary fiction, essays, and nonfiction. The company publishes approximately 35 titles each year, organized into thematic series such as Orijentalist, Kolonija, Farah, Savremena bh. književnost, and Reforma. These series cover diverse subjects, including contemporary Bosnian literature, historical studies, and translated works.

Buybook is particularly notable for its focus on literary translation, supporting the translation of regional and international works into the Bosnian language, which has contributed to the cultural exchange and literary diversity in the region. Additionally, Buybook acts as the Bosnian representative for major international educational publishers, such as Pearson Education from the UK and Holtzbrinck Publishing Group from Germany, and it organizes seminars to enhance foreign language instruction in Bosnian schools.

== Cultural and social engagement ==
In addition to publishing, Buybook has hosted over 300 book launches, author events, public discussions, and literary forums. Past initiatives include projects such as Među nama and Sevdah Republik, aimed at fostering literary and cultural discourse within Sarajevo. From 2004 to 2008, Buybook also operated Café Karabit, a cultural café located within the National Gallery of Bosnia and Herzegovina, which became a popular meeting spot for artists, writers, and the broader intellectual community in Sarajevo.

== Distribution and locations ==
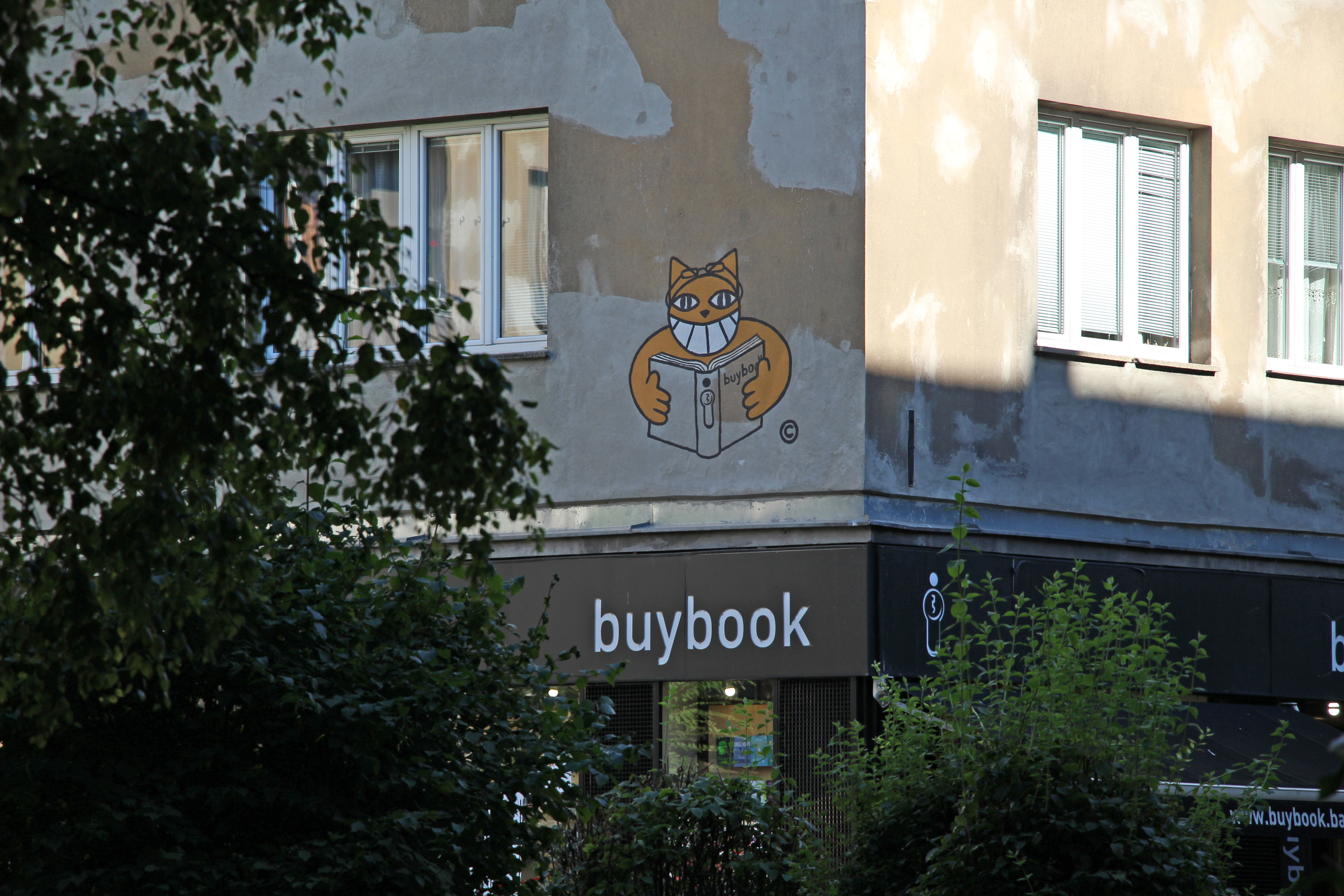
Bookstore in Radićeva street.

Buybook's primary location is in Sarajevo, with additional branches in Tuzla and Mostar, and distribution through various bookstores throughout Bosnia and Herzegovina, Serbia, Croatia and Montenegro. Buybook also imports and sells international titles, providing readers with access to a wide range of global literature and academic works.

== Bookstan ==
In 2016, Buybook founded Bookstan, an annual international literary festival held each July in Sarajevo. Bookstan is a platform for authors, critics, publishers, and readers from Bosnia and Herzegovina, Southeast Europe, and beyond to come together in celebration of literature, culture, and intellectual exchange. Each year, the festival draws approximately 5,000 attendees and features a program designed to address social, political, and cultural issues through literature. With an emphasis on Balkan voices and themes relevant to Southeast Europe, Bookstan has become one of the region's most significant literary gatherings, promoting the role of literature as a bridge across cultures and fostering open dialogue on contemporary issues.
