= Katolikus Ifjúsági Mozgalom =

- Abbreviation: KIM
- Type: Hungarian non-profit youth organization
- Purpose: Catholic youth organization
- Headquarters: Budapest, Hungary
- Location: Hungary
- Members: 3,800 members
- Website: http://kim.katolikus.net/

Katolikus Ifjúsági Mozgalom (KIM) (Hungarian: [ˈkɒtolikuʃ ˈifjuːʃaːɡi ˈmozɡɒlom], in English: "Catholic Youth Movement") is a Hungarian Roman Catholic youth organization. KIM is observing member of the Youth Commission of the Hungarian Catholic Bishops’ Conference. At international level KIM is an observer member of the Catholic umbrella of youth organizations Fimcap.

== History ==
- 1989: KIM was founded after the political changes in 1989 and is one of the oldest non-governmental organizations in Hungary.

== See also ==
- György Bulányi
