= Pázmáneum (disambiguation) =

Pázmáneum is a university in Vienna founded as a theological seminary by Péter Pázmány in 1623.

Pázmány Péter University or Pazmaneum may also refer to

- Pázmány Péter Catholic University, founded in Hungary in 1635. It is the legal successor of part of the school founded by Péter Pázmány in Trnava
- Eötvös Loránd University, the legal successor of the rest of the Trnava university, also known as the University of Budapest, and Royal Hungarian Pázmány Péter University from 1921 to 1950
- Several different educational institutions founded by Archbishop Péter Pázmány (1570–1637)
