= European civilisation =

European civilisation may refer to:

- Culture of Europe
- Western culture, European cultural area around the world
