= Regnum Marianum Community =

Catholic religious community in Hungary

The Regnum Marianum Community, or Regnum Marianum, is a Roman Catholic religious community in Hungary. Its name comes from the traditional use in Hungarian of Regnum Marianum as a name for Hungary.

== History ==
Regnum Marianum was started by a group of diocesan Catholic priests, who gathered, educated and raised youth in one of the impoverished suburbs of Budapest in the last decade of the 19th century. These priests gave mostly religious instruction in the neighbouring schools and took special care of the poor children. Regnum Marianum was formally founded in 1896. In 1902 it registered as "congregation of Mary" in Rome.

Shortly after the introduction of the boy scouting movement into Hungary, Regnum was among its first propagators, and became one of the founders of the Hungarian Scout Association in 1912. However, the formal connection between scouting and Regnum Marianum has ended at the end of the 1940s. The Regnum Marianum Community exerted its influence through religious instruction, boy scout activities and publishing the monthly Zászlónk (Our Flag, circulation about 10,000–20,000), where they presented a very attractive model of Catholic youth in the age group from 1p to 18. The Regnum continued its usual work, until the end of World War II, when Soviet troops occupied Hungary.

In 1951, when the Soviet-backed Communists finished the takeover of Hungary, the activity of Regnum Marianum had been banned, just like almost all religious institutes and communities related to the Church.

The Regnum Marianum Community was the only Catholic youth care group in Hungary. Despite constant harassment, continuously worked under the Communist regime, it secretly organizing groups, meetings, summer camps and other events. Some of the priests and the lay group-leaders were sentenced in three separate conceptional trials (in 1961, 1965 and 1971) to a total of 72 years, most of it being served. Other forms of persecutions (firing from jobs, nonacceptance to universities, moving priests to faraway, run-down parishes) were abundant as well.

== Spirituality ==
Regnum Marianum is a Catholic community, without any innovative theology. Originally, Regnum was a community of diocesan priests, teaching and raising boys 10 to 18 by following the model of Saint Philip Neri and Don Bosco. After 1951, girls also joined the groups, and the age of members was growing. Now, the Regnum is a community of priests and laypeople, taking care of everybody from the youngest to the elderly.

== Today ==
Since the fall of Communism in Hungary in 1989, Regnum was able to participate openly in public life. Using its tradition and potential, it takes part in the re-evangelization of Hungary. As of 2005, it had approximately 2,500 members.

Members take part in the everyday life of the Church and are active in other Christian movements as well.
