= Places inhabited by Rusyns in Hungary =

The Rusyns were one of the 13 official nationalities of the Kingdom of Hungary. In Hungary today, Rusyns live mainly in Borsod-Abaúj-Zemplén County, but they can also be found in Budapest and in Szabolcs-Szatmár-Bereg County. In the 2022 census, 7,111 people identified themselves as Rusyns.

In terms of their origins, the Rusyns were all connected to the Carpathians. The groups living in the historic Kingdom of Hungary resided in what is now Transcarpathia and eastern Slovakia. Some of these groups migrated from there in the 18th century to the north-eastern regions of present-day Hungary. Following settlements have been included which still are or were inhabited by Rusyns:

== Settlements with a significant Rusyn minority ==
=== Komlóska (Комловшка) ===
In 2022, 63 out of 234 residents identified as Rusyns, representing 26.9% of the population.

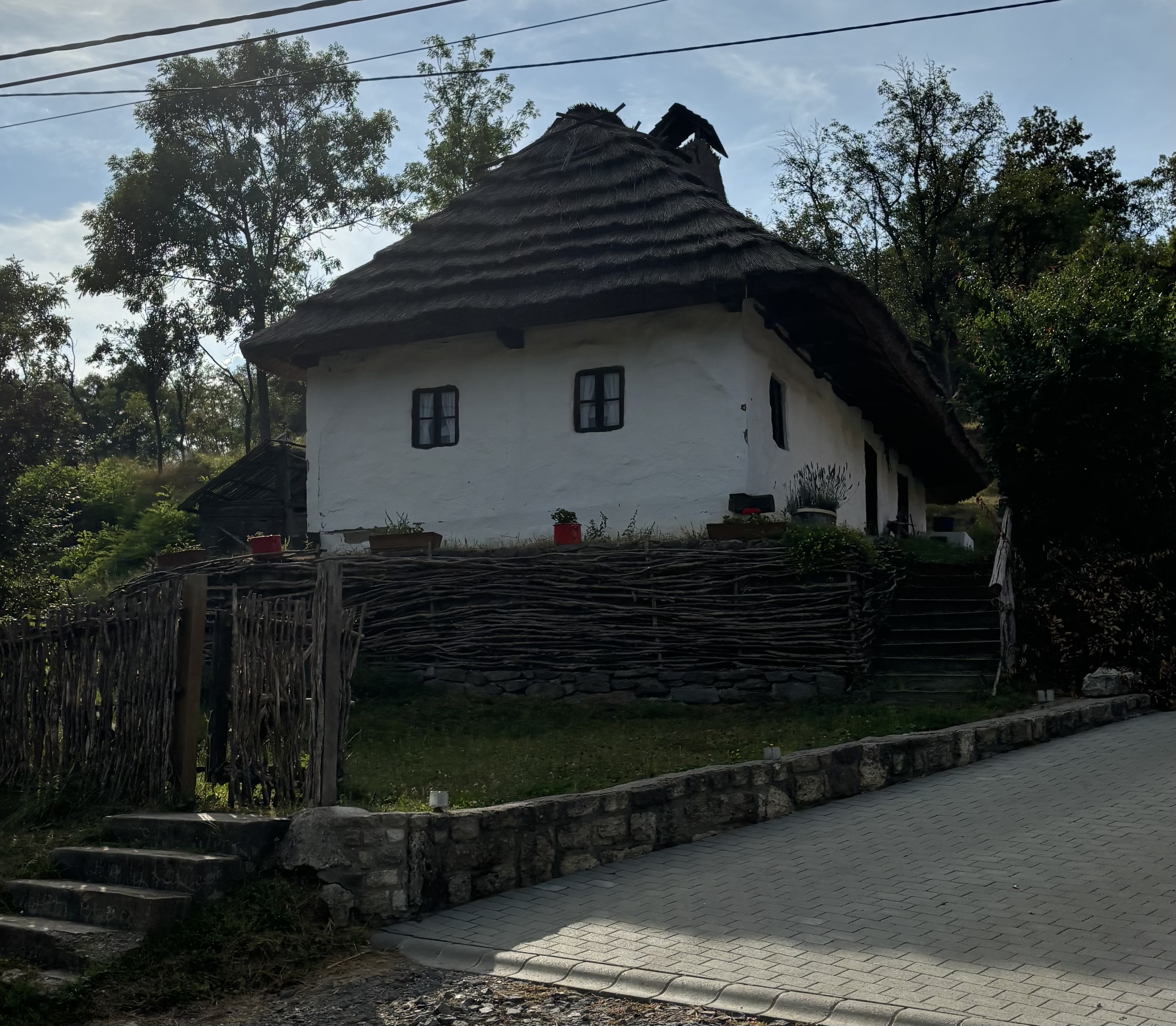
Rusyn Country House in Komlóska

The village was first mentioned in 1379. Rusyn settlers arrived in the village in the 1720s from today's eastern Slovakia. The village is home to a Rusyn Country House, a Greek Catholic church, a Rusyn kindergarten and, until 2020, a Rusyn nationality elementary school, which was the only one of its kind in the country. The Rusyns in the village speak the Komlóska dialect, which is part of the Lemko dialect group.

=== Irota (Ірота) ===
In 2022, 24 out of 79 residents identified as Rusyns, representing 30,4% of the population.

In the 17th century, the village became the property of the Rákóczi family, who settled it with Rusyns. In 1747, 14 of its 28 residential buildings were inhabited by Rusyns. Until 1886, classes were only taught in Rusyn at the village school.

=== Baskó (Башков) ===
In 2022, 74 out of 149 residents identified as Rusyns, representing 47,4% of the population.

In the 17th century, the Trautson family repopulated the village with Rusyn settlers.

=== Sajópálfala ===
In 2022, 86 out of 698 residents identified as Rusyns, representing 12,3% of the population.

The settlement was first mentioned in 1320. After the Ottoman era, the Keglevich family became the owner of the village, and they resettled it with Rusyns from Transcarpathia. A wooden church was built, in which the icon of the Mother of God shed bloody tears from 6 January to 16 February 1717. The present Holy Spirit Church was built on the site of this church in 1772. Today, the village is a pilgrimage place.

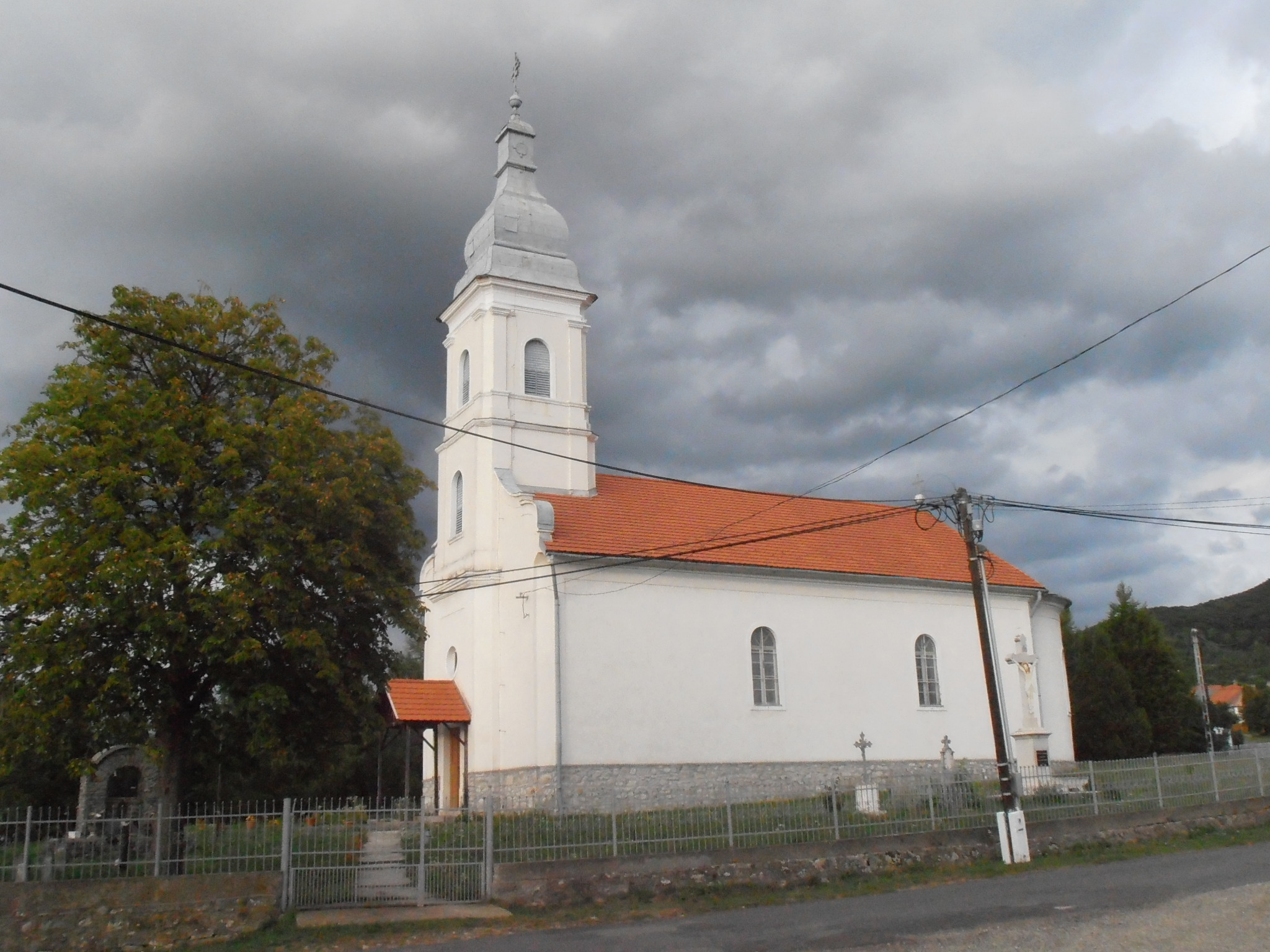
Greek Catholic Church in Mogyoróska

=== Mogyoróska ===
In 2022, 13 out of 79 residents identified as Rusyns, representing 16,5% of the population.

At the turn of the 17th and 18th centuries, Mogyoróska – like the surrounding settlements – had almost become uninhabited. In the first half of the 18th century, the owner of the Regéc estate, the German Prince Trautson, repopulated Mogyoróska with Rusyns to make up for the shortage of labour (as he did with Baskó and Komlóska).

=== Filkeháza (Філкехаза) ===
In 2022, 32 out of 86 residents identified as Rusyns, representing 37.2% of the population.

The first written record of the village dates from 1481, when it was owned by the Filke family. By the 1820s, Filkeháza had become depopulated. It was later repopulated with Slovak and Rusyn inhabitants.

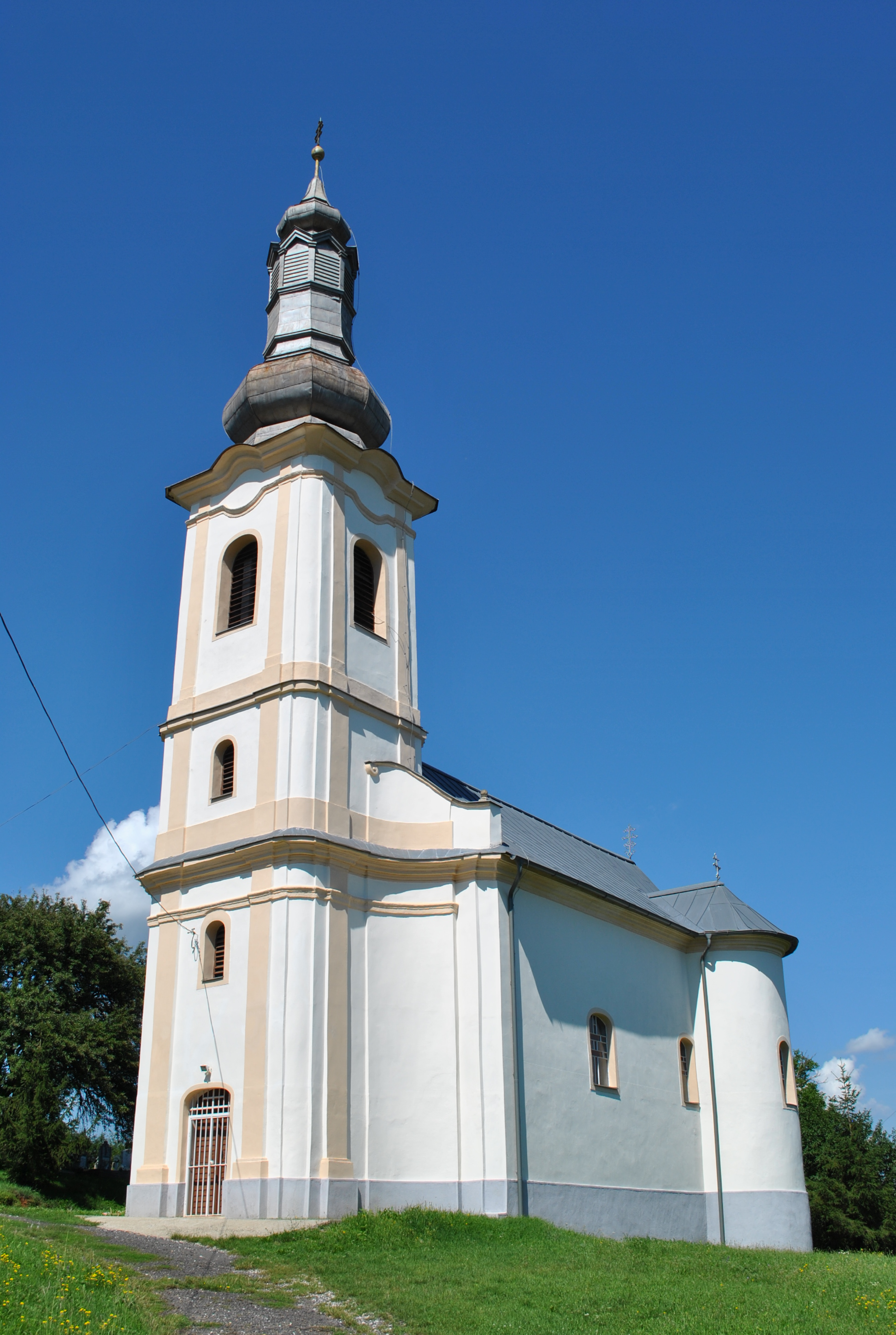
Greek Catholic Church in Abod

=== Abod (Абод) ===
In 2022, 32 out of 131 residents identified as Rusyns, representing 24,4% of the population.

It is first mentioned in a charter dated 1300, under the name Vyobud. In the late 1690s, a Rusyn community settled in the village, and this was followed by a second and a third wave of immigration. The major wave of Rusyn settlement reached the county around 1730 and lasted until the mid-18th century. Lajos Podharszky, clerk of Abod, wrote the following on 5 May 1864: „ … tótok a' múlt században circa Annum 1711. Szepes Sáros 's Felső Abaúj megyéből itten telepedni kezdtek” (“… Tóts began to settle here in the last century, around the year 1711, from the counties of Szepes, Sáros and Felső Abaúj”)

=== Garadna ===
In 2022, 36 out of 349 residents identified as Rusyns, representing 10,6% of the population.

Its name was first mentioned in documents in 1234 as Grathna. From the 17th century, the village was periodically partly depopulated and then repopulated. This was due to the Rákóczi's War of Independence and the plague that came in its wake. In the 1730s, Greek Catholic Rusyns began to settle there.

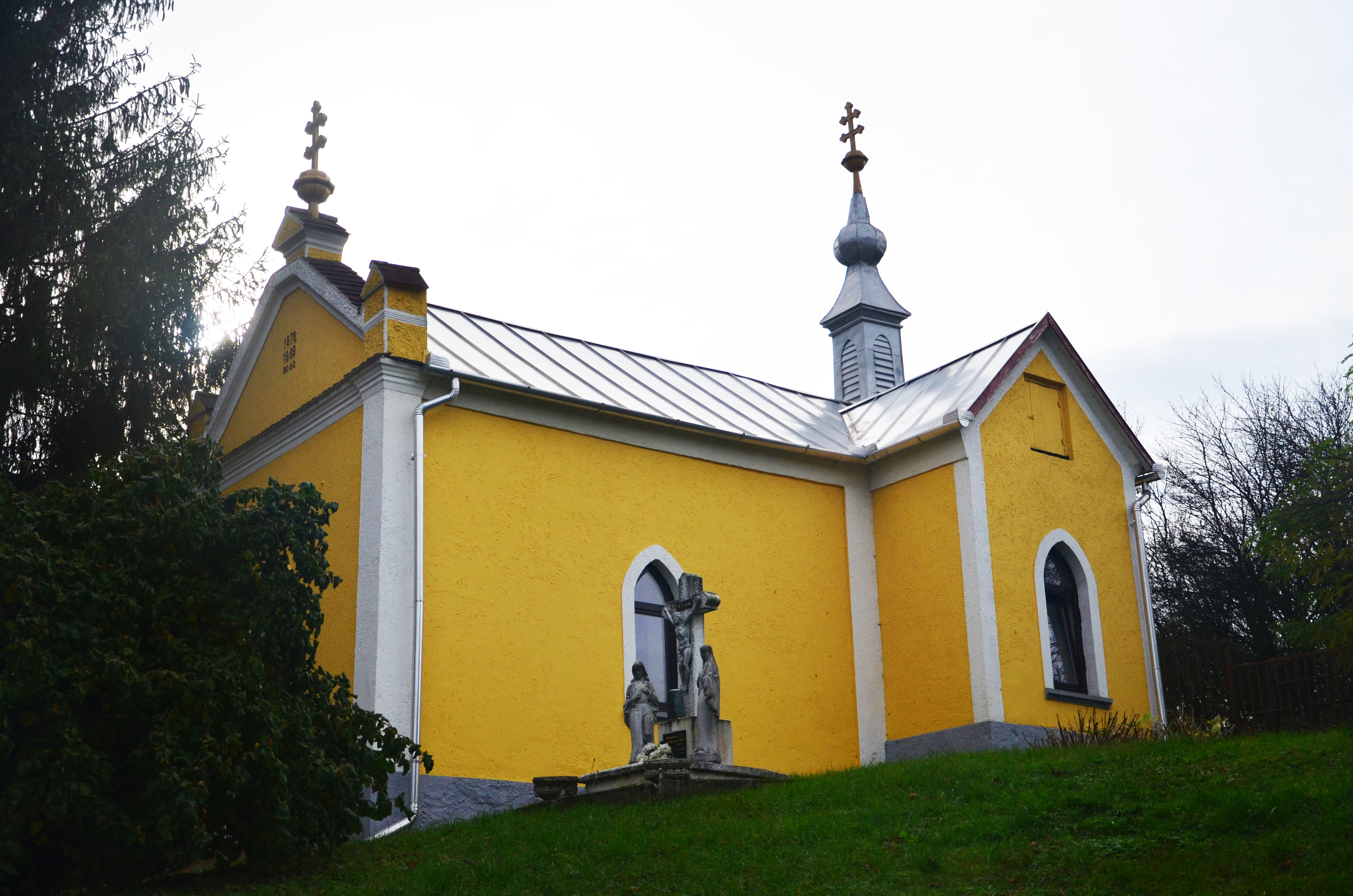
Chapel in Múcsony

=== Múcsony (Мучонь) ===
In 2022, 95 out of 2678 residents identified as Rusyns, representing 3,5% of the population.

Rusyns arrived in the village in the 18th century from today's eastern Slovakia. The Greek Catholic church was built in 1817. To this day, the community still sing a few Church Slavonic chants.

=== Homrogd ===
In 2022, 51 out of 902 residents identified as Rusyns, representing 3,5% of the population.

The first written mention of the settlement dates from 1256 as Humurugd. During the Ottoman era, the village was depopulated. It was only resettled in the mid-18th century, mainly by Ukrainian and Rusyn immigrants. The first wooden church was consecrated in 1779; its restored iconostasis now stands in the new church, which was built in the 1800s.

As well as in the smaller villages inhabited by Rusyns, there are also Rusyns living in Hungary's cities:

According to the 2022 census:
City	Population	Rusyn population
Budapest	1 685 342	1911 (0,1%)
Miskolc	147 533	308 (0,2%)
Debrecen	199 858	178 (0,1%)
Nyíregyháza	116 282	155 (0,1%)
Szikszó	5579	98 (1,8%)
Edelény	9271	94 (1%)
Pécs	139 330	78 (0,1%)
Máriapócs	1887	70 (3,7%)
Szeged	158 797	55
Veszprém	55 910	52 (0,1%)
Vác	34 449	44 (0,1%)
Eger	49 182	37 (0,1%)
Székesfehérvár	95 045	36

Number of Rusyns in the counties of Hungary:

According to the 2022 census:
County	Population	Rusyn population
Borsod-Abaúj-Zemplén	623 024	1620
Szabolcs-Szatmár-Bereg	529 381	727
Pest	1 333 533	679
Hajdú-Bihar	519 141	277
Fejér	419 656	246
Győr-Moson-Sopron	465 945	176
Veszprém	335 361	165
Heves	285 892	145
Baranya	354 022	135
Bács-Kiskun	495 318	133
Csongrád-Csanád	391 184	126
Zala	260 800	126
Jász-Nagykun-Szolnok	355 809	110
Komárom-Esztergom	300 631	105
Somogy	293 470	100
Békés	315 222	94
Tolna	207 931	89
Vas	249 513	88
Nógrád	182 459	59

== Historical Rusyn settlements ==
=== Tornabarakony (Бараконь) ===
The village was first mentioned in 1427 under the name Barakon. The village was deserted during the Ottoman era; in 1678, it was mentioned as a deserted place. Between 1720 and 1728, Rusyn Greek Catholic serfs arrived, and they soon built a church. Between the two world wars, the Greek Catholic elementary school and secondary school were still in operation. The Greek Catholic parish had 13 filial churches. The Treaty of Trianon drew a new border, thereby severing the vital economic lifeline that had ensured the village's livelihood. The school closed in 1965, followed by the shop and the pub in 2003. By 2001, the village had only 28 inhabitants, and by 2011, just 13. The indigenous Rusyns have left the village. In 2022, 0 out of 22 residents identified as Rusyns.

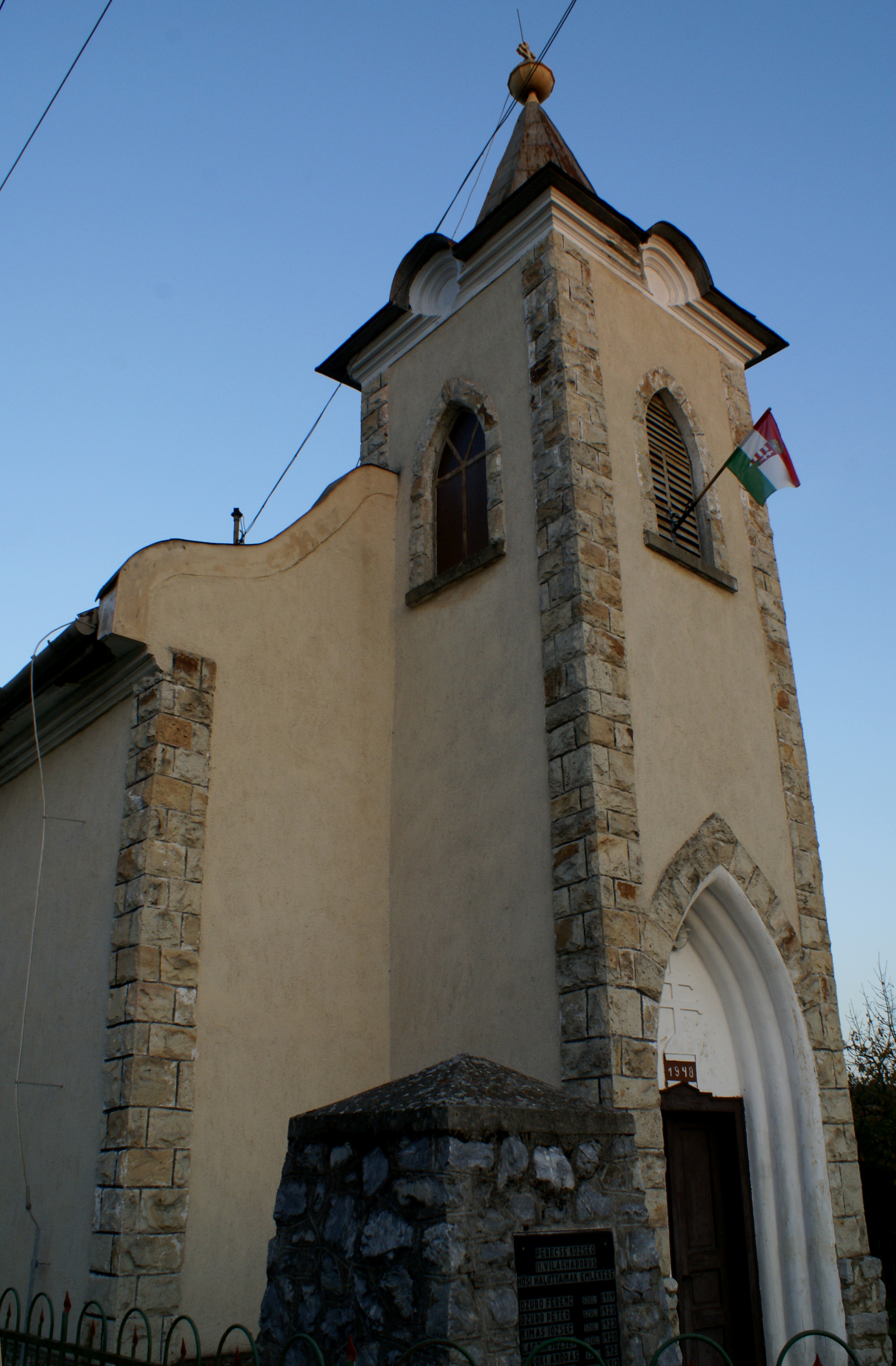
Greek Catholic Church in Perecse

=== Perecse (Перече) ===
In 1255, it was first mentioned in a charter issued by Béla IV under the name Pereche. Due to the high tax burden, by 1715 only one serf family and two smallholder families remained in the village. In 1730, Rusyns arrived in the village, and by 1828 the population had grown to 294. The village's Greek Catholic church was built in 1948. However, the village's population declined steadily throughout the 20th century. Today, Rusyns have disappeared from the village. In 2022, 0 out of 12 residents identified as Rusyns.

=== Rakaca ===
During the Ottoman era, it was a territory under Ottoman rule and paid a tax of 20 forints to the Ottomans. During these years, its population fled to escape the tax burden, and the village became depopulated. In the 1720s, it was resettled by Greek Catholic Rusyns. As late as 1864, „lakosai … orosz tót nyelven beszélnek” (“its inhabitants … still spoke the Russian-Slovak language”) wrote the local clerk. In 2022, 0 out of 804 residents identified as Rusyns.

=== Baktakék ===
Baktakék was formed from the merger of two villages, Bakta and Kéty. Kéty had been uninhabited for a long time, but in 1734 its landowner allowed Rusyns to settle there. The village's Greek Catholic church was built in 1820. In 2022, 4 out of 802 residents identified as Rusyns.

=== Gadna (Руски Ґадна) ===
As in Irota, the Rákóczi family settled Rusyns there in the 17th century. Previously it was known as Oroszgadna (Руски Ґадна or Руська Ґадна), means Russian Gadna. In 2022, 0 out of 305 residents identified as Rusyns.

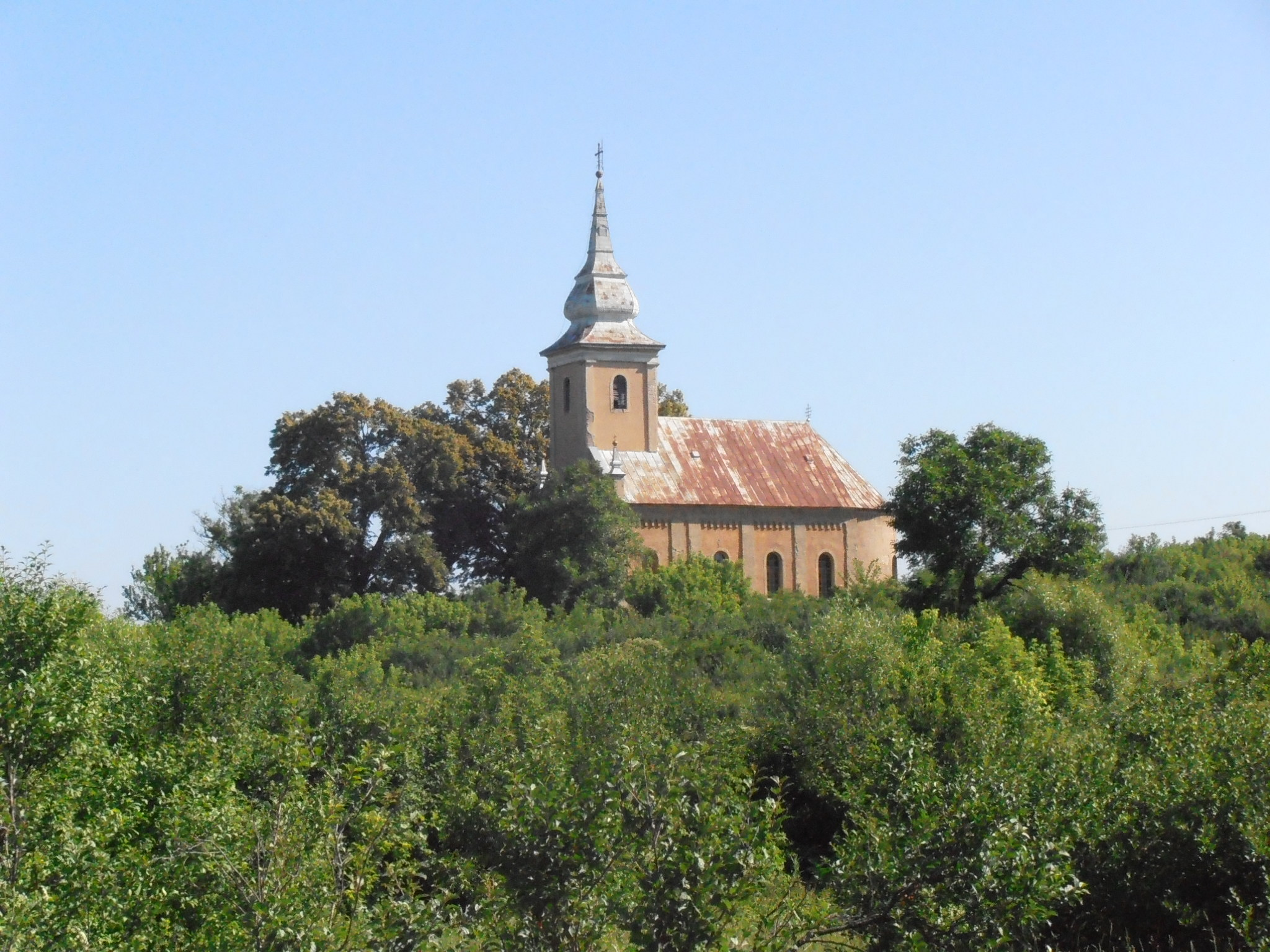
Greek Catholic Church in Abaújszolnok

=== Abaújszolnok (Солнок) ===
The village was deserted during the Ottoman era. Later the Rákóczi family settled Rusyns there. The village's Greek Catholic church was built in 1895. In 2022, 0 out of 184 residents identified as Rusyns.

=== Abaújlak ===
Just like in Abaújszolnok, the village was deserted during the Ottoman era and later the Rákóczi family settled Rusyns there. In 2022, 0 out of 62 residents identified as Rusyns.

=== Kány ===
The first known documented record of it dates from 1319. By the mid-17th century, the village had become deserted. As a result of the resettlements that took place in northern Hungary in the 18th century, Rusyns from Szepesség and Zemplén settled here. In 2022, 3 out of 54 residents identified as Rusyns.
