= Castle of Solymos =

- Solymos vára
- Erdőhorváti, Sárospatak District, Borsod-Abaúj-Zemplén County, Hungary
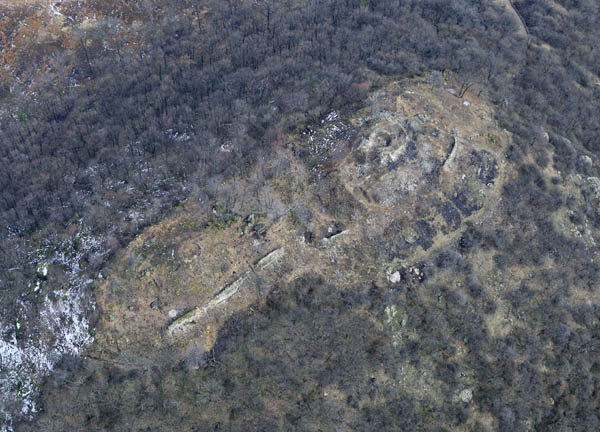
- Aerial photo of the castle ruins

Site information
- Type: Castle

Location
- Location of Castle of Solymos in Hungary
- Coordinates: 48°19′46″N 21°27′10″E

Site history
- Built: 14th century

The Castle of Solymos (Hungarian: Solymos vára), Castle of Komlóska or Pusztavár (means ‘Desert Castle’) is a 14th-century hilltop castle ruin on the border between Komlóska and Erdőhorváti, in Northern Hungary.

== Geography ==
The ruins of the castle sit on a 426-metre-high (1,398 ft) peak of the Zemplén Mountains. Although known as the castle of Komlóska, the peak on which it was built actually lies within the administrative territory of the municipality of Erdőhorváti. But it is easier to reach the castle from Komlóska.

== History ==
According to the information available to date, members of the Tolcsva Clan, who fought in Charles Robert’s army, were granted the land by their ruler, on which they built the stone castle as their residence after 1312.

The castle’s builders used the natural features of the elliptical hilltop and erected thick stone walls along its steep edge.

It served as a residence for the clan for barely a few decades, as Palatine Derek Bebek described it as a ruined castle in a document from 1398. This is why it came to be known as Pusztavár.

== Gallery ==
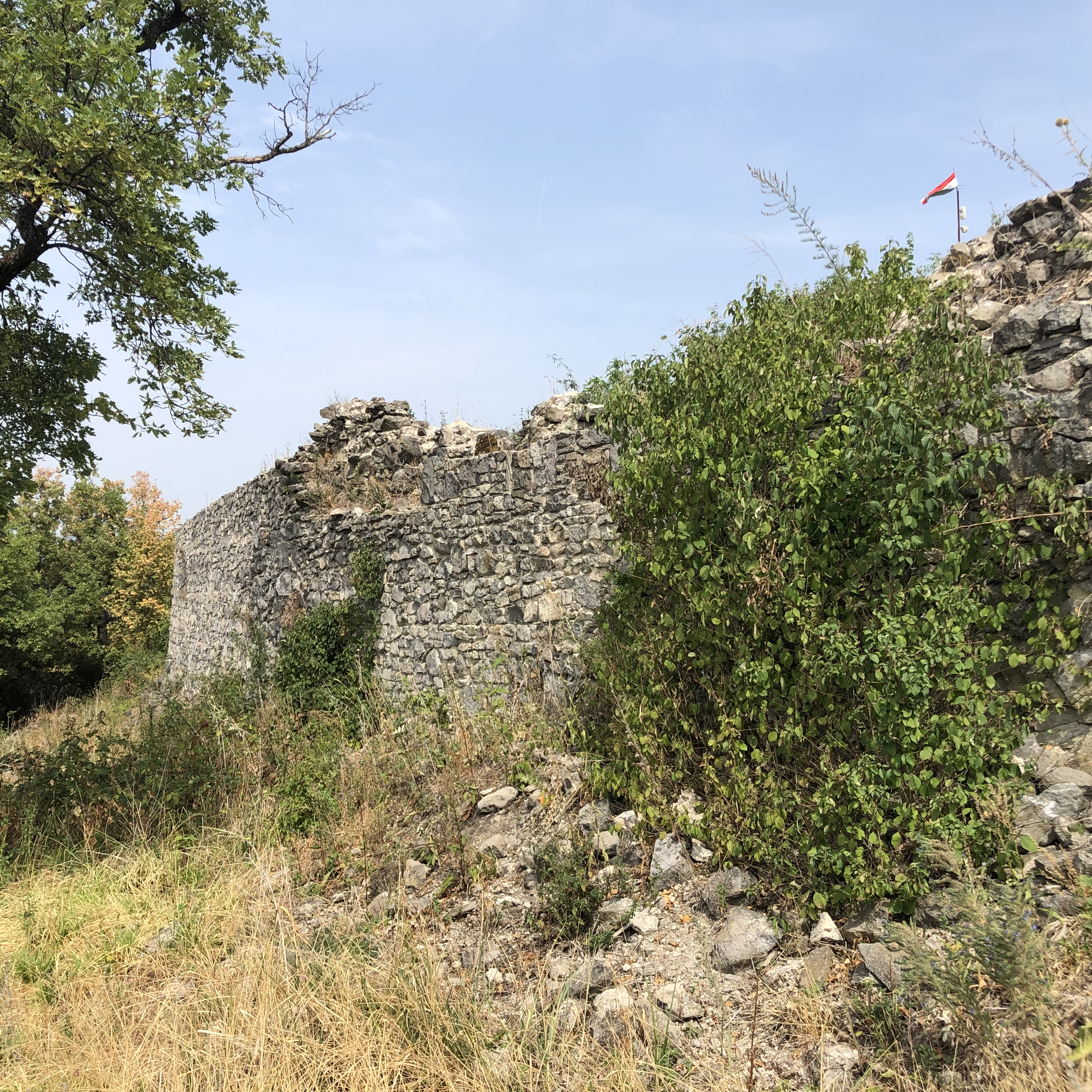

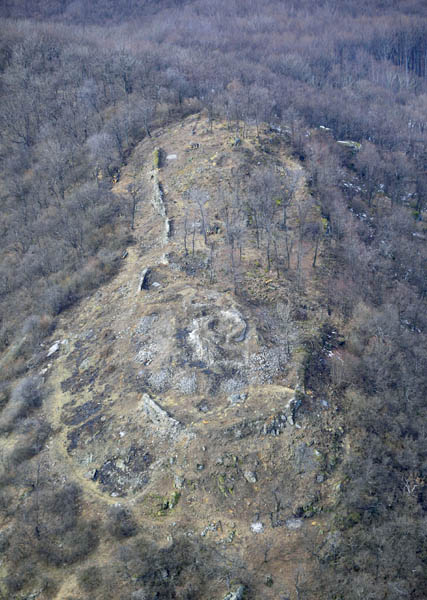

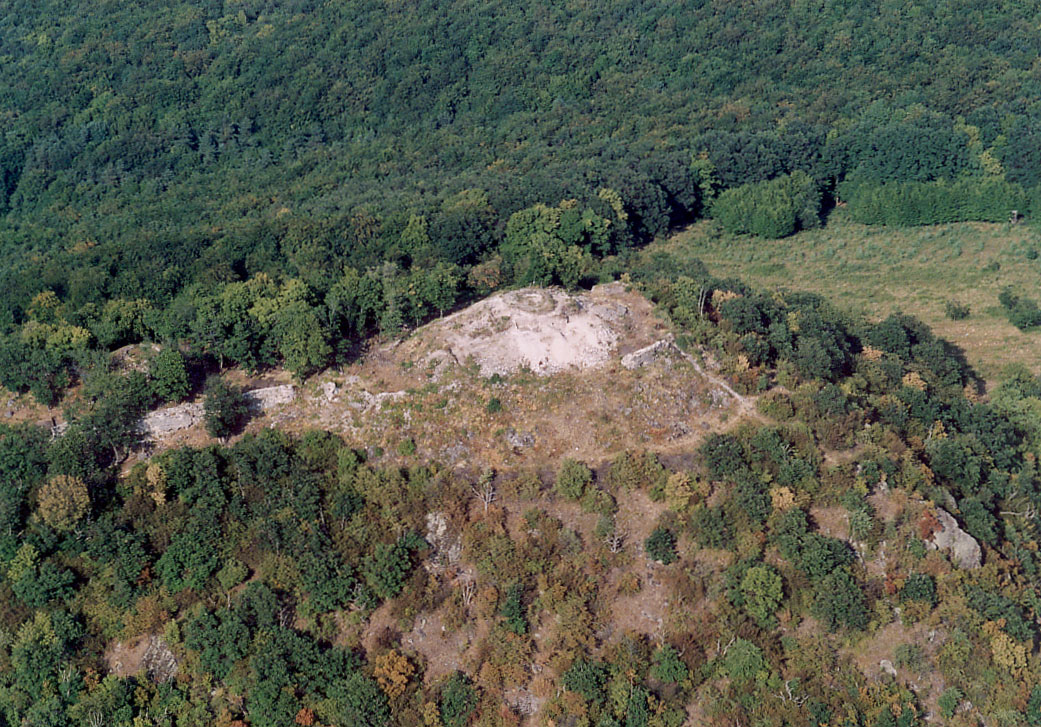

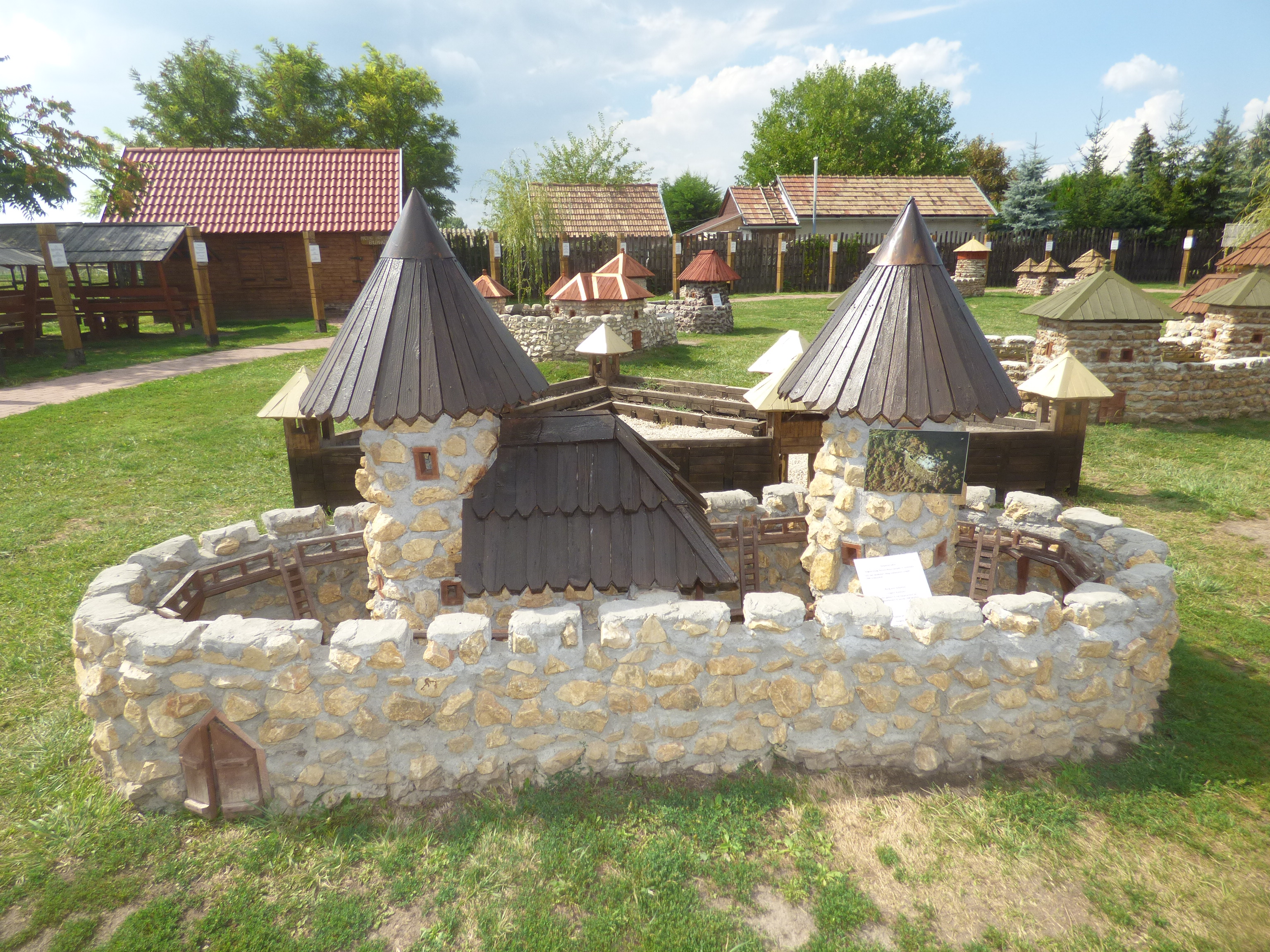
Its model in the Várpark in Gárdony

== See also ==
- List of castles in Hungary
- Komlóska
- Erdőhorváti

== Sources ==
- Gál-Mlakár, Viktor (2006), Várak, kastélyok, templomok, pp. 12-15.
- Gál-Mlakár, Viktor (2007), Pusztavár régészeti feltárásának eredményei, Herman Ottó Múzeum Évkönyve, pp. 87–113.
- Nováki, Gyula (2007), Sárközy, Sebestyén; Feld, István (eds.), Borsod-Abaúj-Zemplén megye várai az őskortól a kuruc-korig, Budapest, pp. 68–70.
