= Reformed Church, Erdőhorváti =

Reformed Church of Erdőhorváti
- Erdőhorváti református templom (Hungarian)
- Southern facade

- Location within Hungary
- Location: Erdőhorváti
- Country: Hungary
- Denomination: Reformed

Architecture
- Architect: György Katona
- Style: Neoclassical
- Years built: 1910–1911

Specifications
- Length: 20 m
- Width: 12 m

Administration
- District: Cistibiscan Church District

The Reformed Church of Erdőhorváti (Hungarian: Erdőhorváti református templom) is a 20th-century Neoclassical Protestant church in the village of Erdőhorváti, in northern Hungary.

== Description ==
The southern oriented church, stands on a hill above the center of Erdőhorváti. Its hall is 20 metres long and 12 metres width, on the southern side the tower connects to it. The spire is square-shaped and covered by a tin roof. The main entrance of the church is from the tower. The church has three windows on the eastern, two on the western side and five on the tower.

It has two bells; the larger, 490-kilogram one was cast by Ferenc Walser in 1890, in Budapest. The smaller one was made by István Ducsák in 1960, in Őrbottyán. The pulpit and the communion table, made of Carrara marble, stand in the center of the church, at the eastern wall. The church has a gallery at the southern and the northern side, the latter one has an organ.

== History ==
After the Reformation in the 16th century, the population of Erdőhorváti became Protestant, and began using the medieval Catholic church, which was still standing at that time. In 1671, Zsófia Báthory took the church away from the Calvinists, and gave it back to the Catholics. From 1693 the Reformed congregation started to use it again, from 1703 to 1705 the Catholics, and from 1705 the Calvinists again. On September 26, 1711 the church became permanently the property of the Catholic Church. From that time the Reformed community didn't have a church for eighty years.

From 1740 they held their worships in a wine house, later in a prayer house. The congregation built its first church between 1785 and 1790. In 1890, a tower was added to it. By the beginning of the 20th century the church building got into a bad condition and became unusable. The current church was built to the tower, between 1910 and 1911, by the plans of György Katona, an architect from Sárospatak.

== See also ==
- Religion in Hungary
- Reformed Church in Hungary
- Erdőhorváti
- Holy Cross Church
