= Church of the Ascension, Komlóska =

Greek Catholic church in Hungary

Coordinates: 48°20′24″N 21°27′52″E

Church of the Ascension
- Urunk mennybemenetele templom (Hungarian)
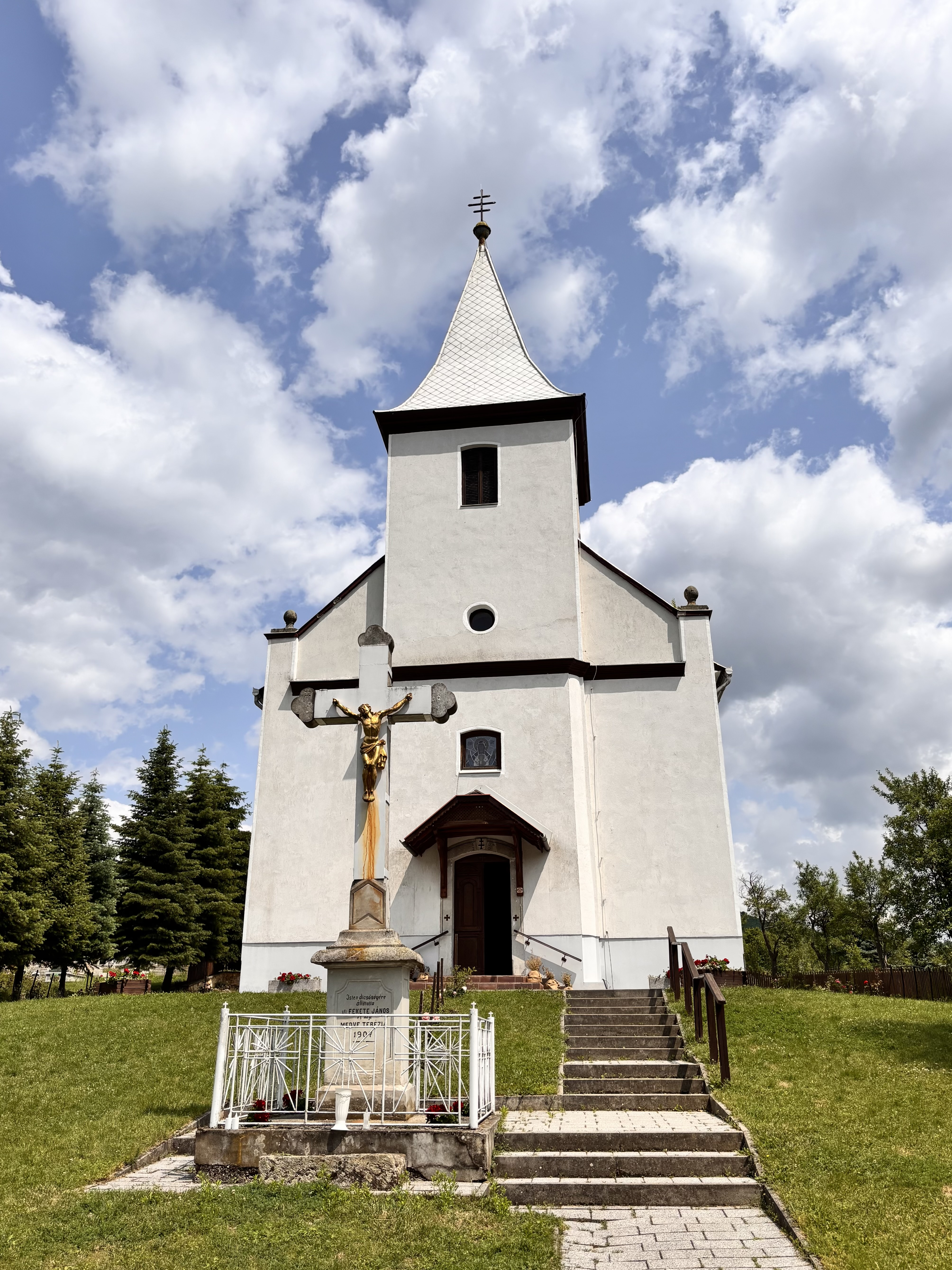
- Façade of the church in 2025

Religion
- Affiliation: Christianity
- Rite: Byzantine rite
- Year consecrated: 1820

Location
- Location: Komlóska
- Country: Hungary
- Interactive map of Church of the Ascension

Website
- komloska.hu

The Church of the Ascension of the Lord (Hungarian: Urunk mennybemenetele templom; Rusyn: Церьков Вознесенія Господа) is a Greek Catholic church in Komlóska, in Borsod-Abaúj-Zemplén County, Hungary.

The church was built in the early 19th century on a hill above the village. It is dedicated to the Ascension of Jesus Christ. What makes the building unique is that, although it is Greek Catholic, it does not have a traditional iconostasis; instead, its interior is decorated with rich stucco and fresco work. It's indulgence is held on the 40th day after Easter.

Administratively, it belongs to the Abaúj-Hegyalja Deanery of the Eparchy of Miskolc. The parish also has two filial churches: the Greek Catholic Church in Erdőhorváti and the Catholic Church in Háromhuta.

== History ==
A religious community already existed in the village in the 14th–15th centuries, but the oldest record in the parish register is from 1759.

The current stone church was built around 1810 and was consecrated in 1820. Its first priest was János Mihályi, who served the local community between 1820 and 1823. The tower of the church in 1895, partly thanks to donations from the people of Komlóska who had emigrated to the United States.

The church's frescoes was restored in 1998 and the façade was renovated in the early 2000s. The community also restored the church's Cyrillic-script, Old Church Slavonic Gospel.

== Interior ==
The church is a single-nave, hall church covered by a barrel vault. What makes it special is that it has no iconostasis, which is common in Greek Catholic churches. Instead, the interior is dominated by rich decoration; walls painted in shades of blue, gold-plated stucco ornamentation and a relief-carved ceiling.

The main altarpiece in the sanctuary shows the Ascension of Jesus Christ, reflecting the church's title. Further biblical scenes are shown on the vault, like the Epiphany and the Resurrection of Jesus Christ.

== See also ==
- Greek Catholicism in Hungary
- Eparchy of Miskolc
