= Church of the Nativity of the Virgin Mary, Tolcsva =

Church of the Nativity of the Virgin Mary
- Kisboldogasszony-templom (Hungarian)
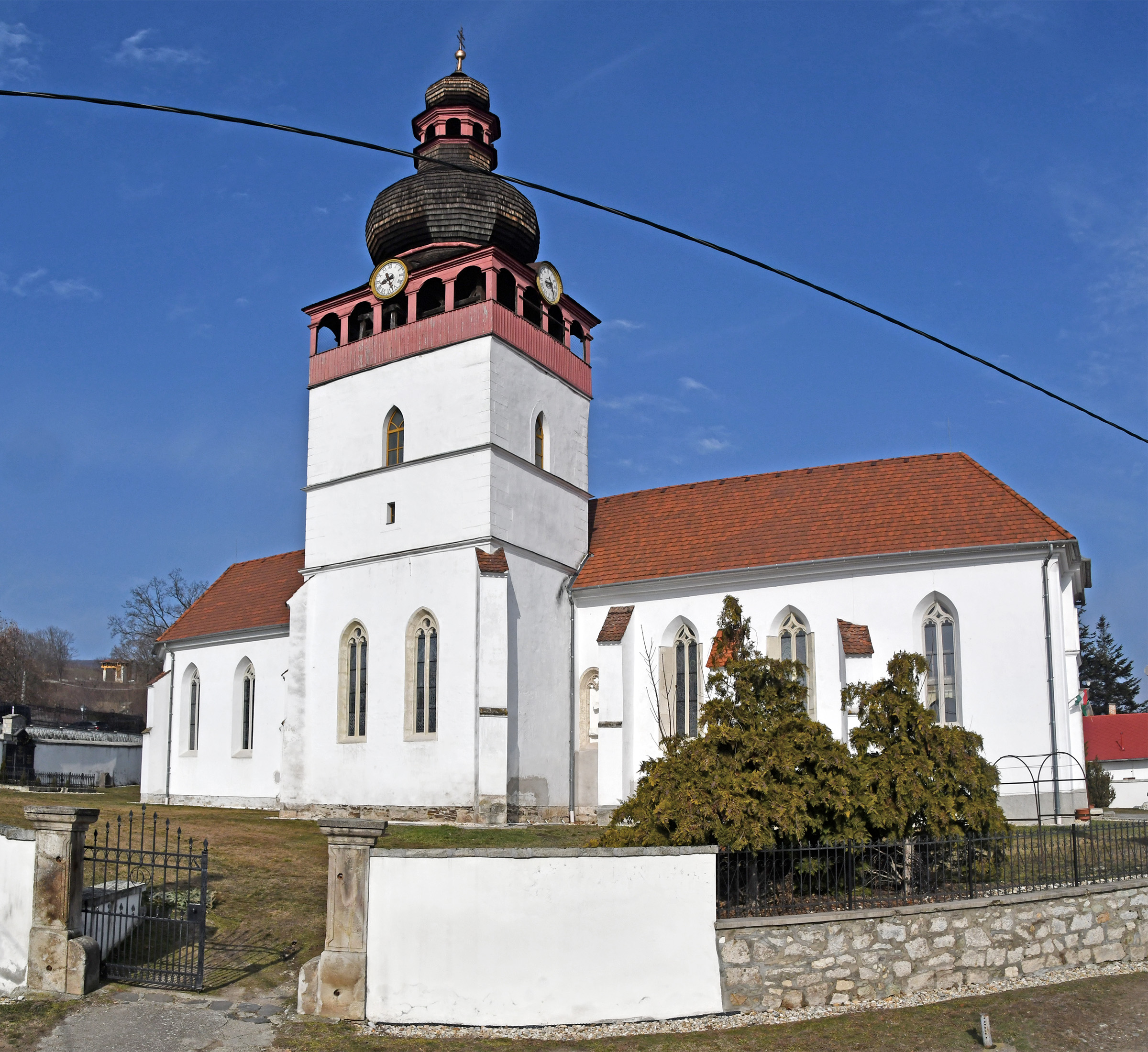

- Location within Hungary
- 48.28701760820792°N 21.44560881367275°E
- Location: Tolcsva
- Country: Hungary
- Denomination: Catholic Church
- Sui iuris church: Latin Church

Architecture
- Functional status: Active
- Style: Gothic

Administration
- Archdiocese: Archdiocese of Eger

The Church of the Nativity of the Virgin Mary (Hungarian: Kisboldogasszony-templom) is a Gothic Catholic parish church in Tolcsva, northern Hungary.

== History ==
The exact date of the church's construction is unknown, but it was built around the 14th century in the Gothic style.

The oldest bell dates from 1655 and was made by master bell-founder György Wierd in Eperjes (now Prešov in Slovakia).

As a result of the Reformation Tolcsva became a Reformed settlement and the church was used by Calvinists from 1536 to 1671 and again from 1701 to 1711.

In the 18th and 19th centuries, the church was renovated in Baroque style, and the tower with a shingled roof resembling an Orthodox onion dome was added at this time.

In March 1806 the Holy Crown of the Kingdom of Hungary was kept in the side chapel of this church during the Napoleonic Wars.

== Gallery ==
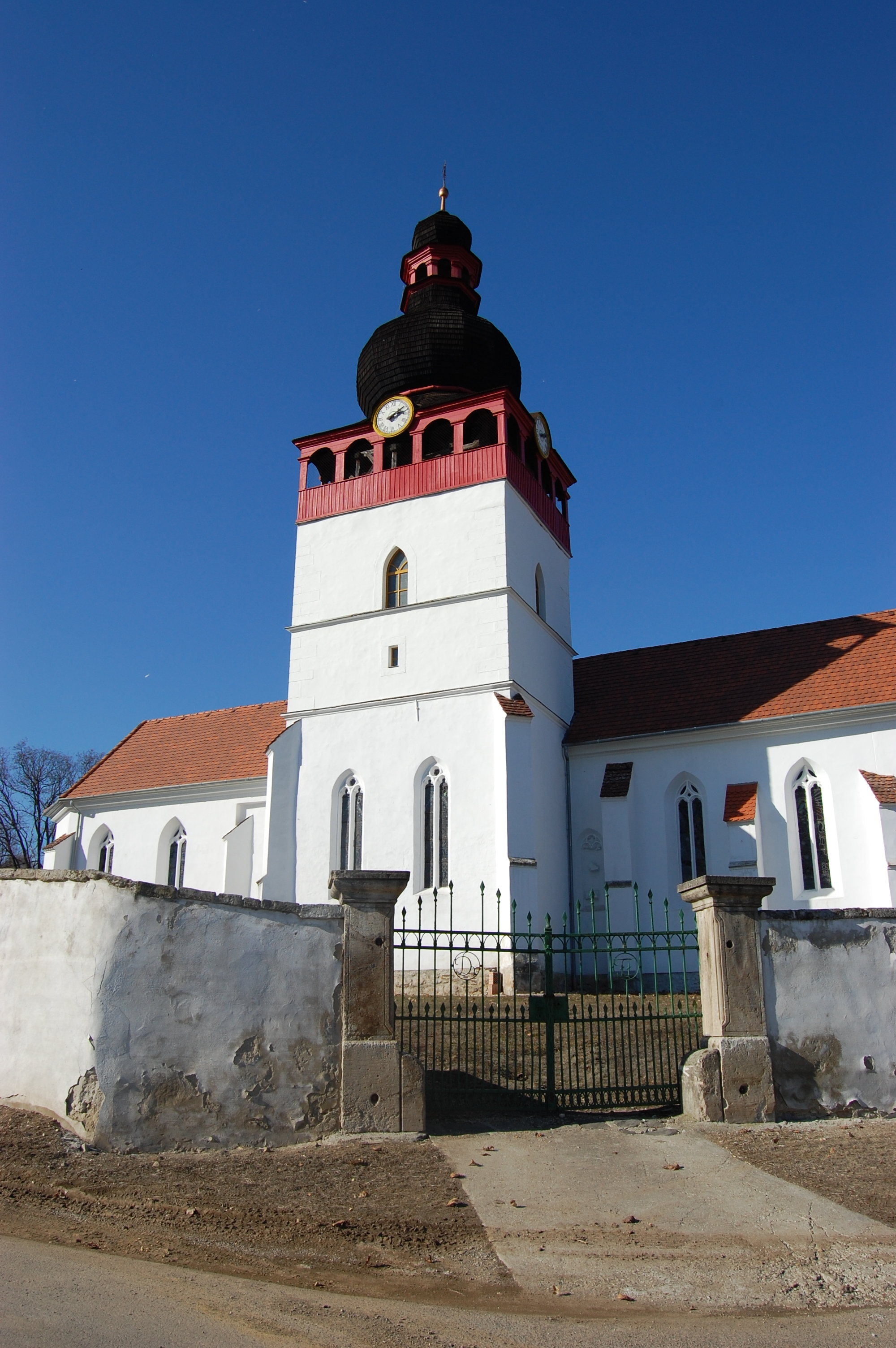
Baroque tower

Gothic windows

Interior

Side chapel

Sanctuary

== See also ==
- Roman Catholicism in Hungary
- Tokaj Wine Region
- Tolcsva
