= Rusyn Country House, Komlóska =

Rusyn Country House
- Ruszin Tájház
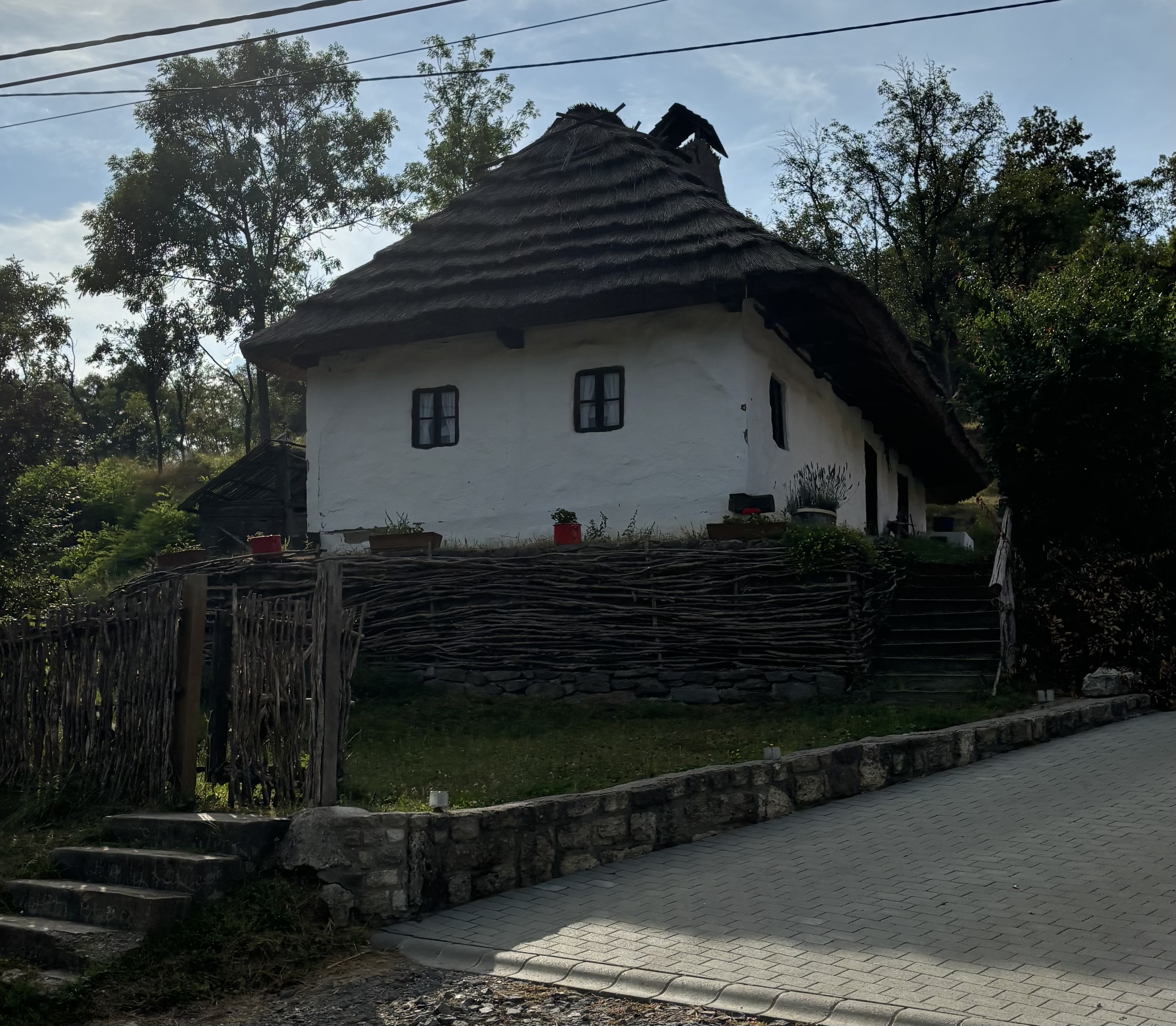
- Interactive map of the Rusyn Country House area

General information
- Location: Komlóska, Hungary
- Coordinates: 48°20′15″N 21°27′41″E
- Opened: 1980
- Owner: Government of Hungary

Website
- komloska.hu

The Rusyn Country House (Hungarian: Ruszin Tájház; Rusyn: Русиньскый дім) is a listed building in Komlóska in Northern Hungary. It is a farmhouse built in the first half of the 19th century, which showcases the traditional culture and way of life of the local Rusyn minority.

== History ==
The building was built in the first half of the 19th century and follows the room-vestibule-barn layout typical of the region. Its interior displays the lifestyle of the early 1900s.

Its special value is the unique brick oven (kabolás kemence) which is the only one in Hungary that survived in its original form.
