= Komlóska dialect =

Rusyn dialect spoken in Komlóska, Hungary

- Komlovshsʹkyy dialect
- Комловшськый діалект
- Language family: Indo-European: Balto-Slavic; Slavic; East Slavic; Rusyn; Lemko dialect; Komlóska dialect
- Early forms: Proto-Indo-European: Proto-Balto-Slavic; Proto-Slavic
- Writing system: Cyrillic script

Language codes
- ISO 639-3: –
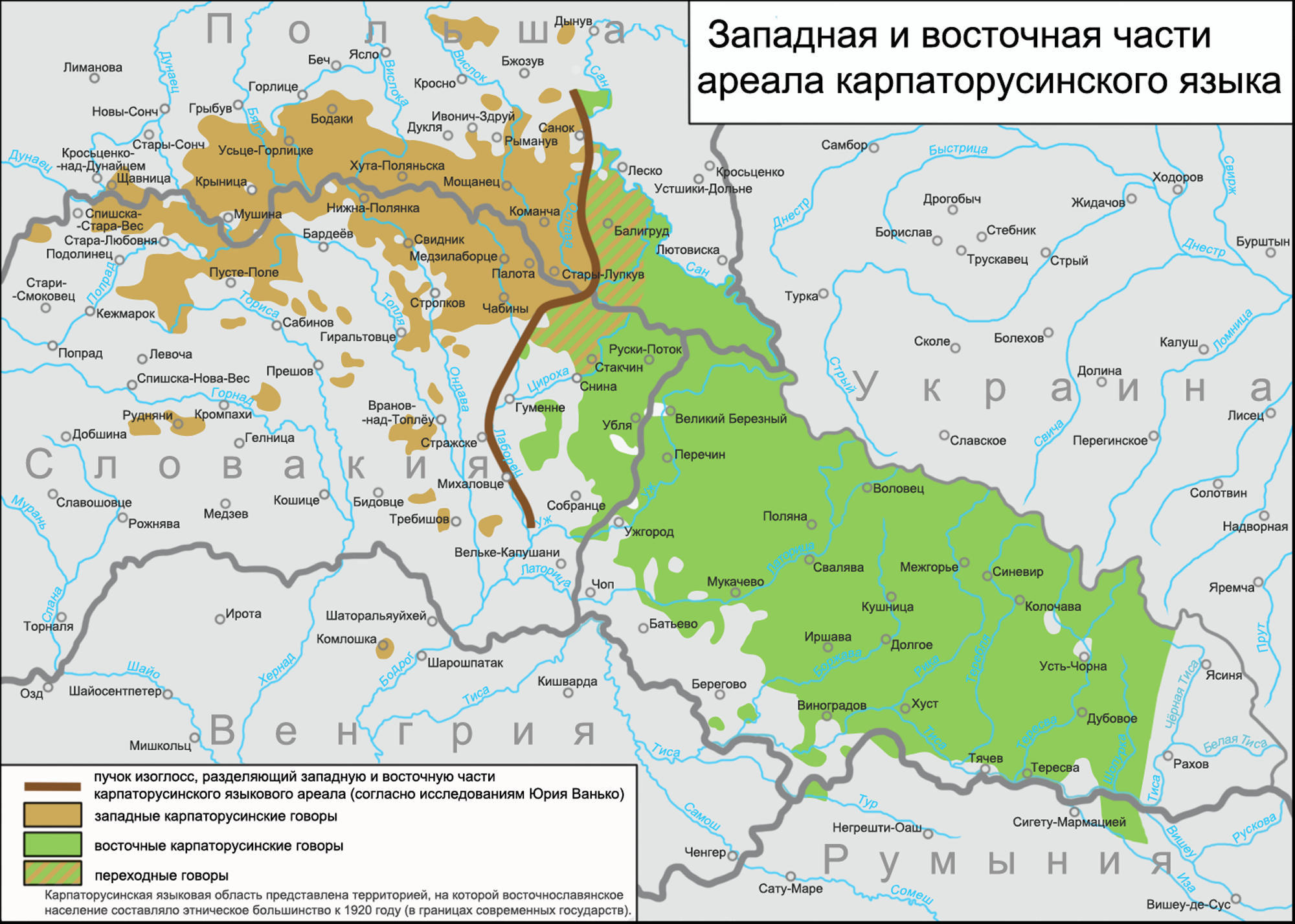

The Komlóska dialect (Rusyn: Комловшськый діалект) or Komlovshsʹkyy dialect is the traditional variety of the Rusyn language spoken in Komlóska, Hungary. It belongs to the southern group of Lemko dialect. The number of speakers is declining; in everyday speech, it is used primarily by the older generation.

== Main features ==
In addition to the dialectal features characteristic of the Lemko dialect – such as the hardening of the soft ‘s’ and ‘z’ consonants into harder fricatives – a number of specific dialectal characteristics can also be found in the Komlóska dialect. One such example is the formation of numbers following the pattern of pyat' a dvadtsat' [пять а двадцать] (‘twenty-five’, literally: ‘five and twenty’).

=== Vocabulary ===
The Hungarian language has a strong influence on the vocabulary used in the Komlóska dialect.

== Usage ==
The number of speakers is extremely low. In the 2022 census, only 26.9% of the village’s population identified as Rusyn, but the actual number of people who know the language may be even lower.

== See also ==
- Komlóska
- Rusyn language

== Bibliography ==
- Gergely Benedek: Komlóska ruszin nyelvjárása, A Magyar Nyelvtudományi Társaság Kiadványai, Budapest, 2022. ISBN 978-615-5061-22-6
