= Tolcsva =

- Village
- Flag Coat of arms

- Location of Tolcsva
- Coordinates: 48.28457°N 21.44942°E
- Country: Hungary
- Region: Northern Hungary
- County: Borsod-Abaúj-Zemplén
- District: Sárospatak

Government
  - Mayor: Gábor Tóth

Area
  - Total: 16.49 km^{2} (6.37 sq mi)

Population (1 January 2026)
  - Total: 1,445
  - Density: 87.63/km^{2} (227.0/sq mi)

Population by ethnicity (2022)
  - Hungarian: 90,8%
  - Rusyn: 6,0%
  - Gypsy: 4,4%
  - German: 0,1%
  - Other: 1,3%
  - Unreported: 9,1%

Population by religion (2022)
  - Roman Catholic: 36,7%
  - Greek Catholic: 18,7%
  - Reformed: 11,7%
  - Other Catholic: 0,4%
  - Lutheran: 0,2%
  - Israelite: 0,1%
  - Non religious: 3,1%
  - Unreported: 29,1%
- Time zone: UTC+1 (CET)
  - Summer (DST): UTC+2 (CEST)
- Postal code: 3934
- Area code: (+36) 47
- Website: tolcsva.hu

Tolcsva is a village in Borsod-Abaúj-Zemplén county, Hungary. It is the birthplace of film pioneer William Fox.

== Geography ==
It is located in northeastern Hungary, in the Zemplén Mountains, on both sides of the Nagy-Tolcsva Stream, between Szerencs and Sátoraljaújhely, 25–25 km away from each.

It borders five villages; Erdőhorváti to the north, Sárazsadány to the east, Olaszliszka to the southwest, Erdőbénye to the west, and Vámosújfalu to the south.

The village can only be reached by road; the easiest route is via Secondary road 3716, which branches off from Main Road 37; this road also connects the village with other settlements located in the higher elevations of the Zemplén Mountains. From Erdőbénye, it can be reached via Secondary road 3717.

Not far from the southern border runs the Budapest–Sátoraljaújhely railway line, one of its stations is the Olaszliszka–Tolcsva station, located in Vámosújfalu. It is about 3 kilometers from the center of Tolcsva.

== History ==
Tolcsva and its surroundings have been inhabited since the Paleolithic era. Archaeologists have found valuable artifacts in and around the village, most of which are on display at the Ottó Herman Museum in Miskolc and the National Museum in Budapest.

The documents were first mentioned in 1255 under the name Tolchwa. In 1486, the settlement was granted the status of a market town, and it continued to benefit from various municipal privileges.

In 1856, the town was devastated by a serious fire, during which numerous public buildings and 90 houses were burned to the ground. The Administrative Act of 1886 downgraded the town to the status of a village.

== Notable residents ==
- William Fox (1879–1952) – Hungarian American businessman, founder of the Fox Film Corporation and the Fox West Coast Theatres
- Margit Feldman (1929–2020) – Hungarian Holocaust survivor and activist
- Barna Buza, (1873–1944) – Hungarian politician and jurist, Minister of Agriculture (1918–1919) and Minister of Justice (1918)
- Béla Mezőssy (1870–1939) – Hungarian politician, Secretary of Agriculture (1906–1910) and Minister of Agriculture (1917–1918)
- Rabbi Avrohom Yitzchok Glick – Rabbi of Tolcsva from 1858 until his death in 1909, and author of the multivolume Yad Yitzchok.

== Gallery ==
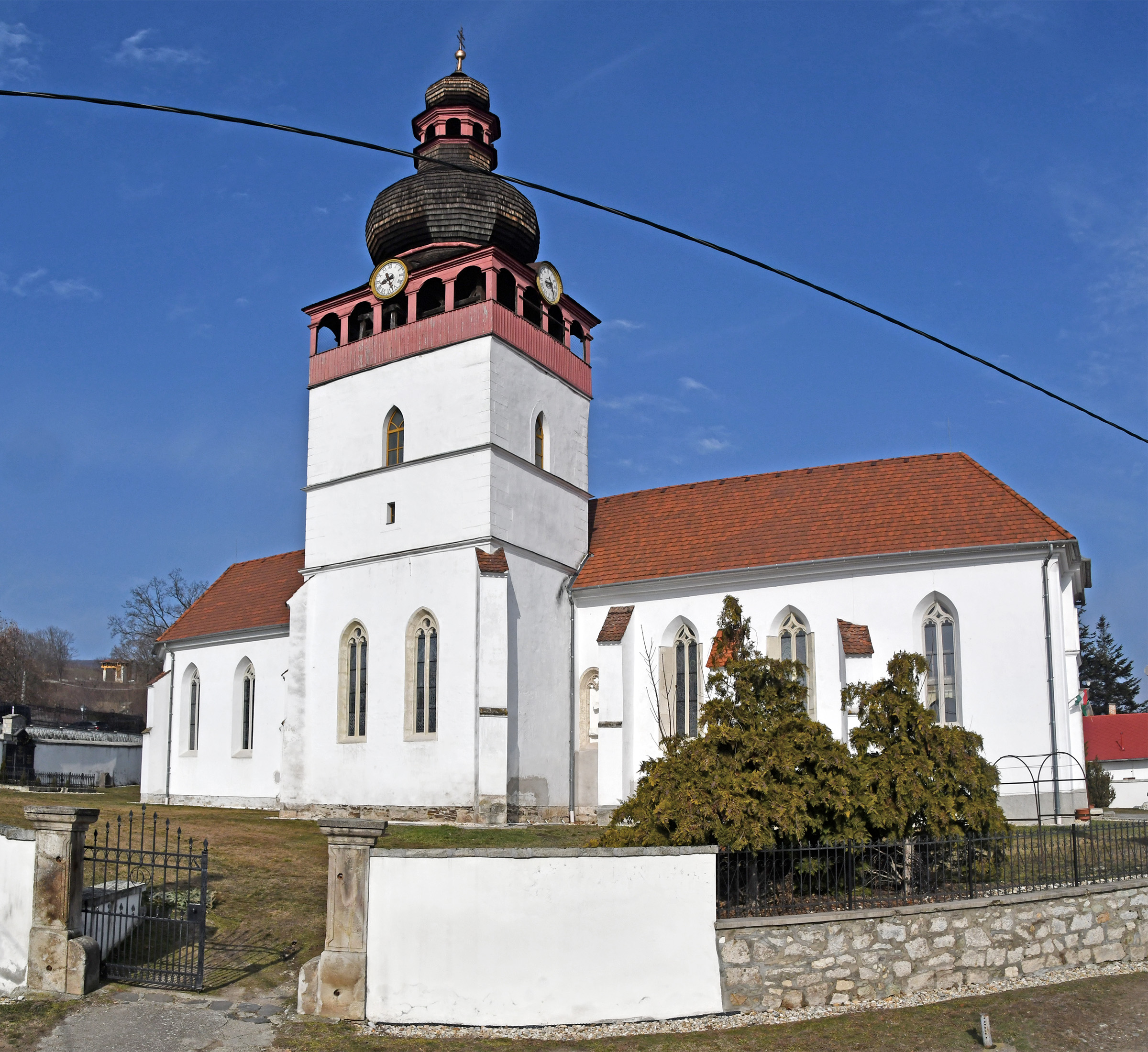
Catholic church

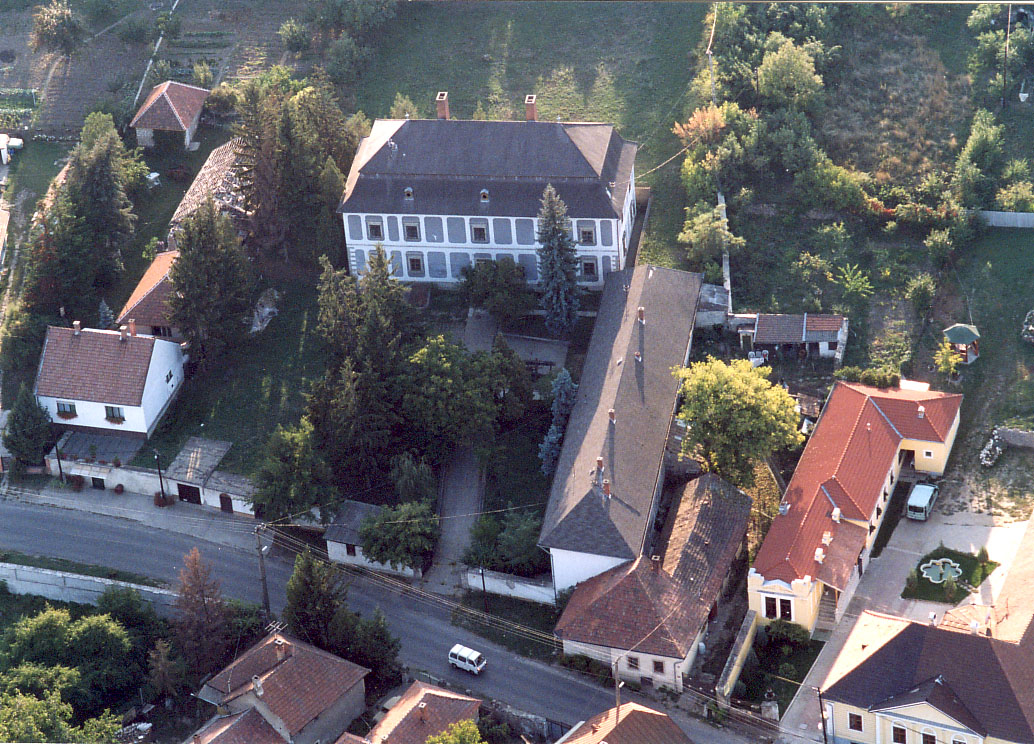
Rákóczi Castle

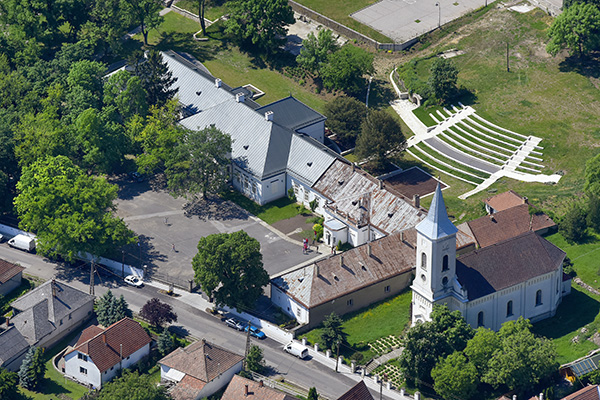
Szirmay-Waldbott Castle and the Reformed church

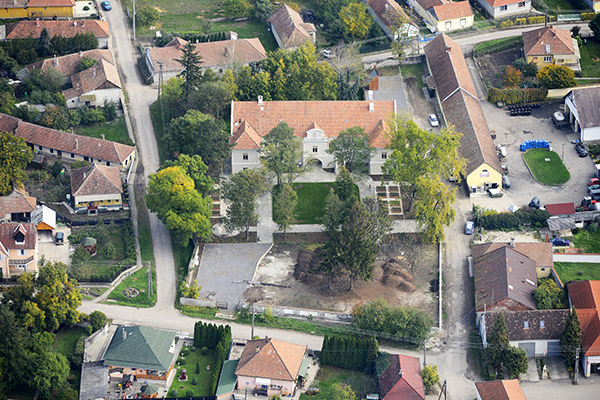
Dessewffy Castle

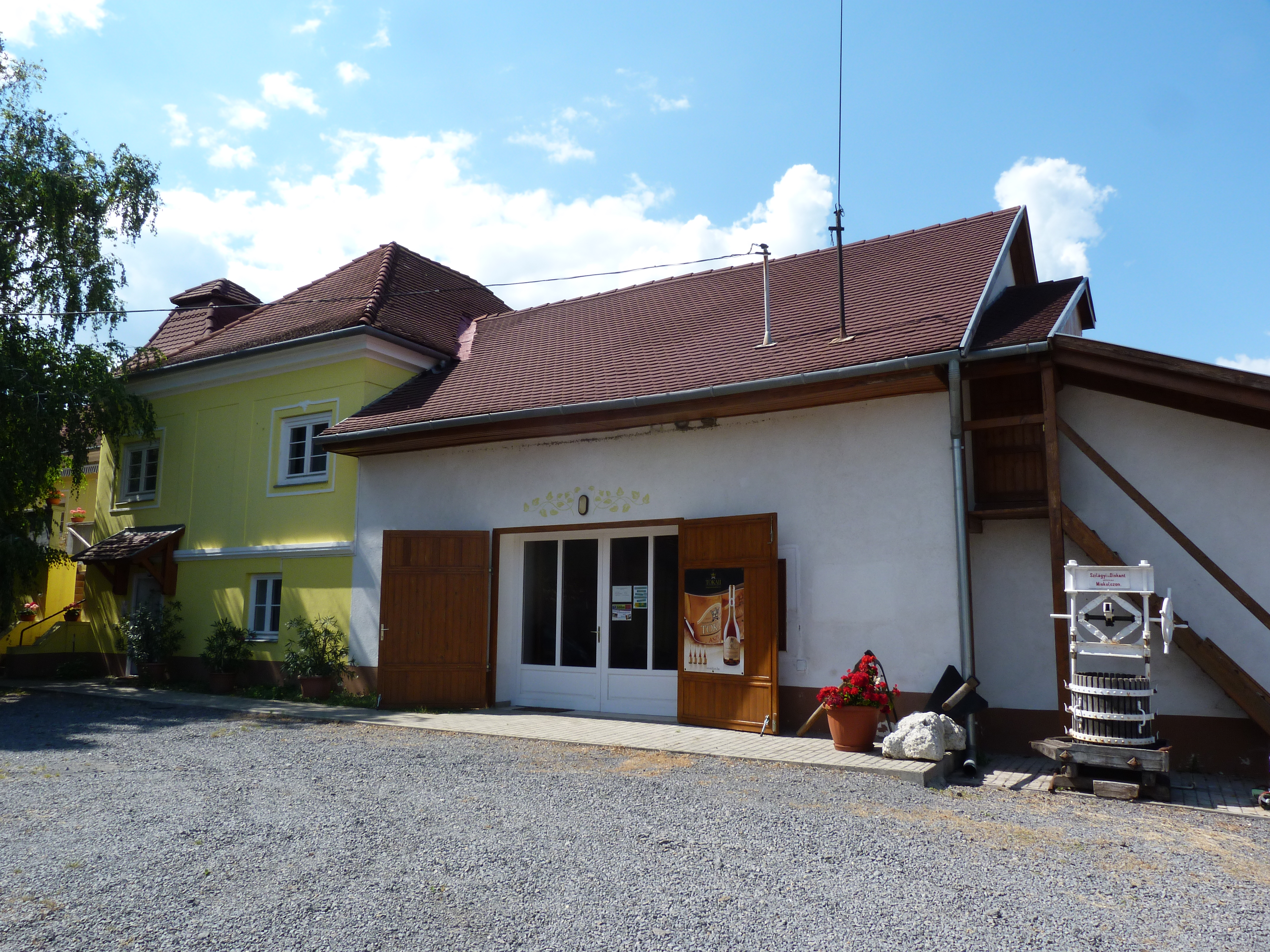
Wine Museum
