= Perecse =

- Location of Perecse
- Coordinates: 48.50253°N 20.98482°E
- Country: Hungary
- County: Borsod-Abaúj-Zemplén

Area
  - Total: 12.53 km^{2} (4.84 sq mi)

Population (2004)
  - Total: 27
  - Density: 3.51/km^{2} (9.1/sq mi)
- Time zone: UTC+1 (CET)
  - Summer (DST): UTC+2 (CEST)
- Postal code: 3821
- Area code: 46

Perecse is a village in Borsod-Abaúj-Zemplén County, Hungary.
