= Abod =

- Village
- Flag Coat of arms

- Location of Abod
- Coordinates: 48°24′N 20°48′E
- Country: Hungary
- County: Borsod-Abaúj-Zemplén

Area
  - Total: 31.16 km^{2} (12.03 sq mi)

Population (2004)
  - Total: 282
  - Density: 9.05/km^{2} (23.4/sq mi)
- Time zone: UTC+1 (CET)
  - Summer (DST): UTC+2 (CEST)
- Postal code: 3753
- Area code: 48

Abod is a village in Borsod-Abaúj-Zemplén county, Hungary.
