= Holy Cross Church, Erdőhorváti =

Coordinates: 48°18′58″N 21°25′43″E

Holy Cross Church
- Szent Kereszt-templom (Hungarian)

- Location within Hungary
- Location: Erdőhorváti
- Country: Hungary
- Denomination: Catholic Church
- Sui iuris church: Latin Church

Architecture
- Functional status: Active
- Style: Neo-Baroque
- Years built: 1787

Administration
- Archdiocese: Archdiocese of Eger

The Holy Cross Church (Hungarian: Szent Kereszt-templom) is a baroque Catholic church in the village of Erdőhorváti, in northern Hungary, within the Tokaj Wine Region.

== History ==
Tradition holds that even before the arrival of the Pauline monks to Erdőhorváti, there was already a wooden church in the village, which was used by the Calvinists until 1711, when it was destroyed by a fire. The new church was built in its place in Neo-Baroque style 1787 and can still be seen today on the hill overlooking the village's main street.

The church's large bell was cast by György Wierd in Eperjes (now Prešov in Slovakia) in 1653, and the small bell was cast by F. W. Rincker in Budapest in 1923.

== Gallery ==
Southern façade

Entrance

Interior

Gallery and the organ

== See also ==
- Roman Catholicism in Hungary
- Tokaj Wine Region
- Erdőhorváti
