= Erdőhorváti =

- Village
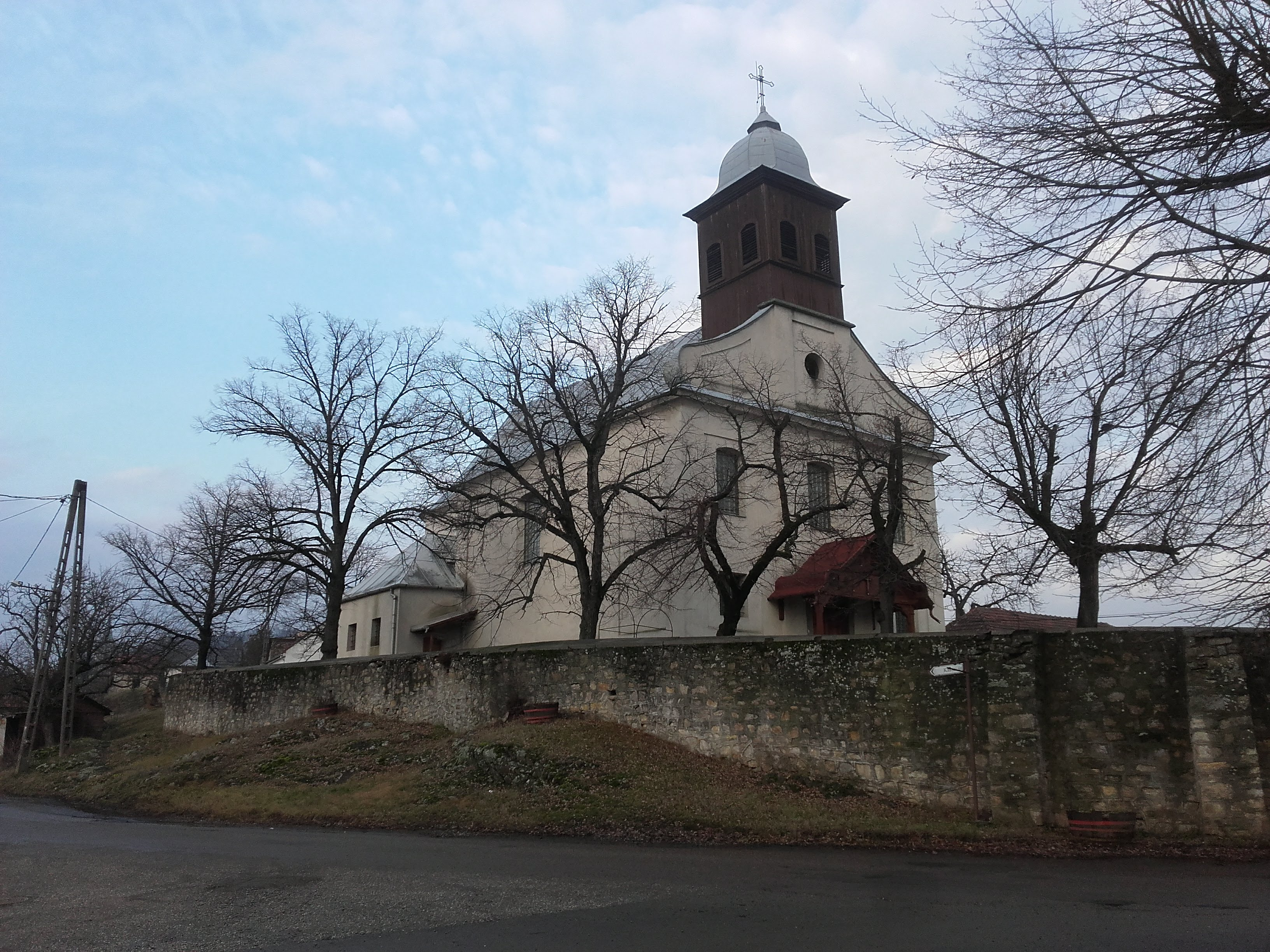
- Holy Cross Church

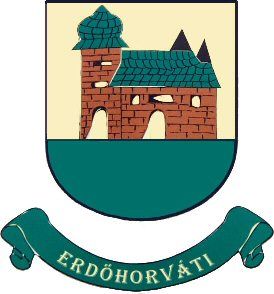
- Coat of arms

- Location within Hungary
- Coordinates: 48°18′58.07″N 21°25′41.88″E
- Country: Hungary
- Regions: Northern Hungary
- County: Borsod-Abaúj-Zemplén County

Government
  - Mayor: László Tóth

Area
  - Total: 50.11 km^{2} (19.35 sq mi)

Population (2025)
  - Total: 523

Population by ethnicity (2022)
  - Hungarian: 92,2%
  - Gypsy: 17,3%
  - Rusyn: 6,9%
  - Slovak: 0,6%
  - Romanian: 0,4%
  - German: 0,2%
  - Other: 0,9%
  - Unreported: 7,8%

Population by religion (2022)
  - Roman Catholic: 29,4%
  - Reformed: 19,2%
  - Greek Catholic: 14,3%
  - Lutheran: 0,4%
  - Other Christian: 0,4%
  - Non religious: 3,9%
  - Unreported: 32,4%
- Time zone: UTC+1 (CET)
  - Summer (DST): UTC+2 (CEST)
- Website: erdohorvati.hu

Erdőhorváti (Slovak: Čierne Horváty) is a village in Borsod-Abaúj-Zemplén County, in the Sárospatak District.

== Geography ==
Erdőhorváti is located in the Zemplén Mountains, within the Tokaj wine region, in the valley of the Tolcsva stream. It lies about 70 kilometers northeast of Miskolc and 20 kilometers west of Sárospatak.

The neighboring settlements are Háromhuta to the north, Komlóska to the east, Tolcsva to the south, Olaszliszka and Erdőbénye to the southwest, Baskó to the west, and Mogyoróska to the northwest.

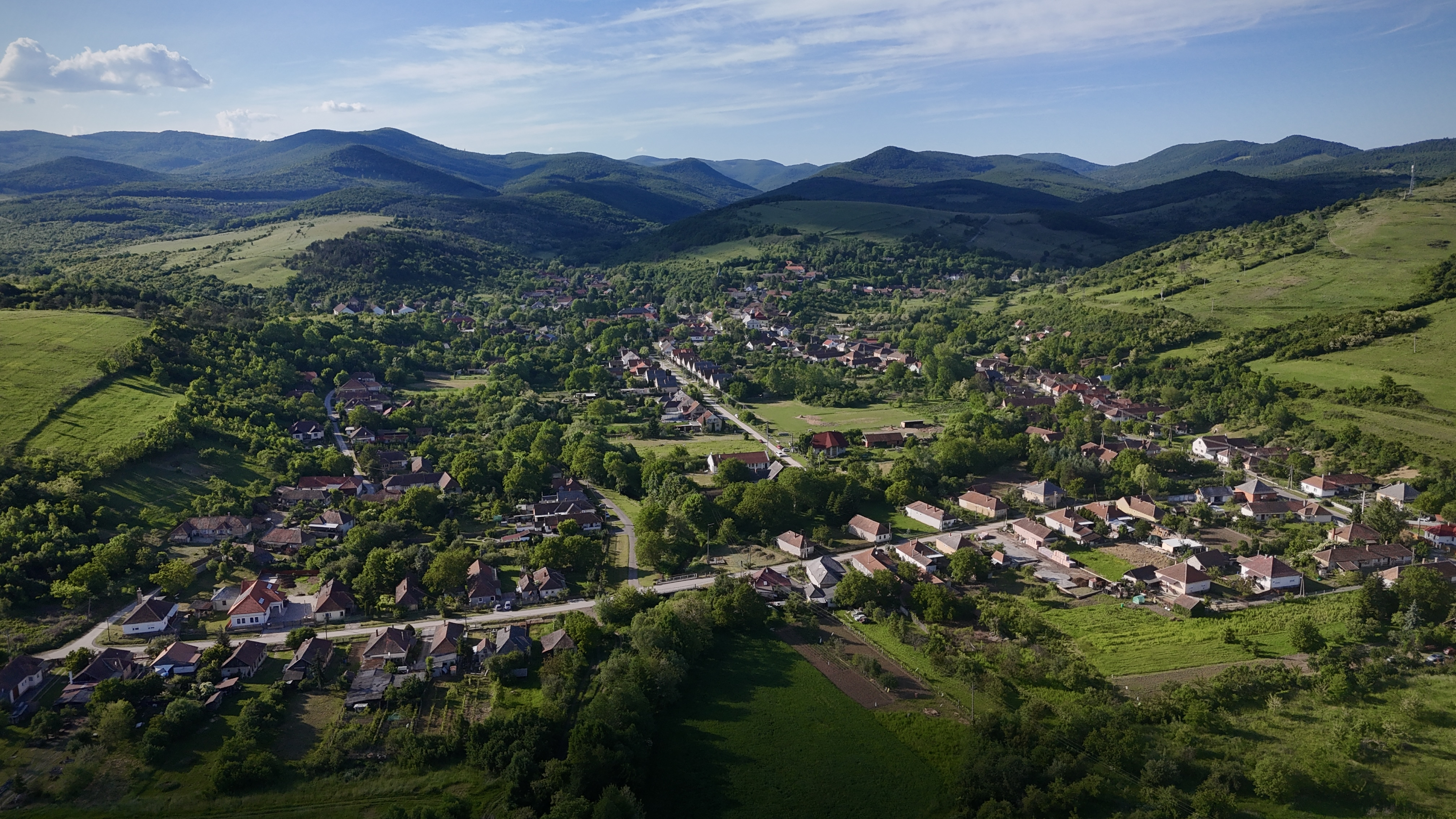
View of Erdőhorváti

Erdőhorváti is accessible only by road via Tolcsva or Háromhuta (Óhuta) through the 3716 secondary road, branching off in its center to the 37134 road leading to the dead-end village of Komlóska.

== History ==
The village is first mentioned after the Mongol invasion, but it likely existed earlier. Artifacts from the Celtic era have been found in the remains of a fort on Várhegy, suggesting its history predates the Hungarian Conquest.

=== First Written Records ===
Erdőhorváti is first mentioned in a 1342 royal land dispute. In 1341, legal representation was used by Miklós, Jakab, and Balázs, sons of Dubou, to summon Domokos in a land case dating back to 1328.

In 1353, the village was mentioned in connection with a Paulite monastery built there. The ruins were visible in the 15th century but are no longer identifiable.

In 1398, it was referred to as Horváthy, owned by István Debreő and his sons.

=== Later History ===
In 1647, Erdőhorváti became the property of Zsuzsanna Lorántffy, wife of György Rákóczi I. After the Rákóczi estate was confiscated, it became royal property, later owned by several noble families.

In 2010, Erdőhorváti was flooded five times, causing severe damage. The community worked together to restore the village, receiving support from state and civil organizations. As a gesture of gratitude, the village gifted a Christmas tree to the Parliament in 2010 and again in 2011.

== Demographics ==
At the end of the 19th century, the population was around 1400, with significant Croatian, German, and Slovak communities. The village was known for its cultural and religious diversity.

During the 20th century, the village faced significant changes due to the World Wars. The Jewish community was deported during World War II. The population decreased significantly during the communist era.

By 1990, the population had decreased to 778. The village still maintains its cultural and religious traditions, with active Rusyn and Slovak communities.

As of 1 January 2025, the population is 523. In the 19th century, Erdőhorváti had a diverse population, including Hungarians, Croatians, Germans, and Slovaks.

== Coat of Arms ==
The coat of arms features a stylized fortress symbolizing historical fortifications, with green fields representing the local landscape and agricultural heritage.

== Erdőhorváti pretzel ==
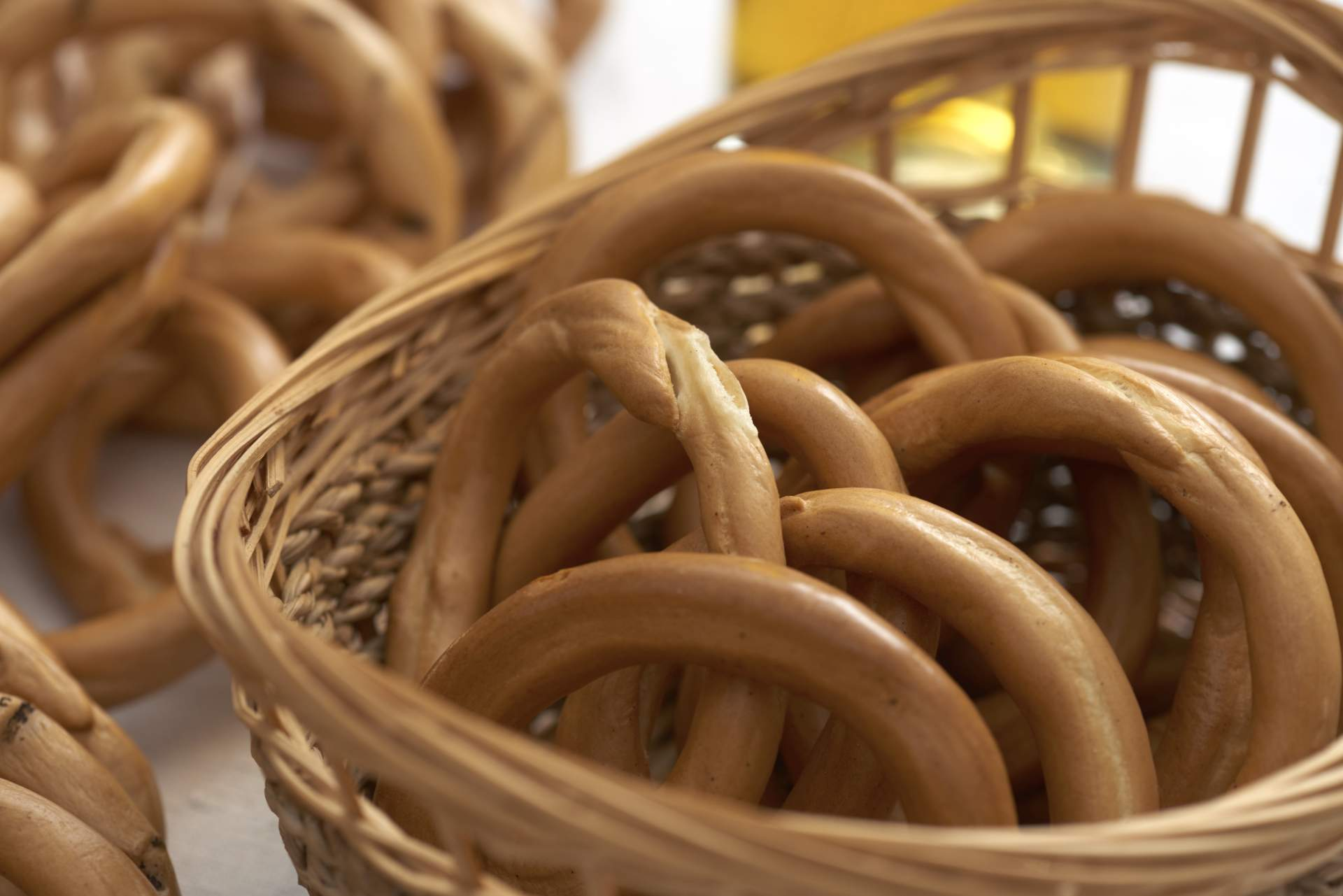
Erdőhorváti pretzel

The Erdőhorváti pretzel (Erdőhorváti perec) is a significant part of the local culinary tradition. Traditionally made from fine white flour, the dough is kneaded hard, cut into small pieces, and rolled into thin strips. The raw pretzels are dipped in hot water, then baked and strung on hemp twine.

Two types of pretzels are known: the egg-based ones are about 5 cm in diameter, while the fasting (böjtös) pretzels are about 6 cm. Historically, larger pretzels were baked in the early 20th century. The pretzel was widely popular in the 20th century, with Erdőhorváti becoming a significant baking center in the Tokaj-Hegyalja region.

== Szentendre Open-Air Museum ==
The Szentendre Open-Air Museum features two buildings representing Erdőhorváti's cultural and architectural heritage: the Erdőhorváti residential house and the Erdőhorváti Methodological House.

== Mineral wealth ==
Erdőhorváti and its surrounding mountains are rich in minerals, including opal, obsidian, hematite crystals, red jasper, onyx, and chalcedony. The region's unique geological features are detailed in Adrienn Tóbiás's book, Erdőhorváti – The Kingdom of Minerals.
