= Vámosújfalu =

- Village
- Flag Coat of arms

- Location within Hungary
- Coordinates: 48°16′N 21°28′E
- Country: Hungary
- Regions: Northern Hungary
- County: Borsod-Abaúj-Zemplén County

Government
  - Mayor: Lajos Jadlóczki

Area
  - Total: 10.64 km^{2} (4.11 sq mi)

Population by ethnicity (2022)
  - Hungarians: 94,3%
  - Rusyns: 5,5%
  - Gypsies: 2,7%
  - Germans: 0,9%
  - Slovaks: 0,4%
  - Ukrainians: 0,3%
  - Armenians: 0,1%
  - Other: 1,2%
  - Unreported: 5,5%

Population by religion (2022)
  - Reformed: 35,4%
  - Roman Catholic: 20,4%
  - Greek Catholic: 13,7%
  - Orthodox: 0,4%
  - Other Catholic: 0,3%
  - Judaist: 0,3%
  - Other Christian: 0,1%
  - Non religious: 4,2%
  - Unreported: 25,1%
- Time zone: UTC+1 (CET)
  - Summer (DST): UTC+2 (CEST)
- Postal code: 3941
- Area code: (+36) 47
- MP: László Lontay (TISZA)
- Website: vamosujfalu.hu

Vámosújfalu is a village in Borsod-Abaúj-Zemplén County in northeastern Hungary.

== Geography ==
It lies on the right bank of the Bodrog, about 800 meters north of the river. Geographically, it can be considered a typical Great Plain settlement.

The main road leading to the village is Main road 37, which runs along its northern border. This is where the Olaszliszka–Tolcsva station on the Budapest–Sátoraljaújhely railway line is located; it is situated in the southwestern part of the village.

== History ==
The village was first mentioned in the 14th century as a customs post. In 1630, it was the estate of Zsuzsanna Lorántffy, and subsequently passed into the ownership of George Rákóczi through her. By the end of the 17th century, it had become a deserted place and was not repopulated until the early 18th century.
