= Baskó =

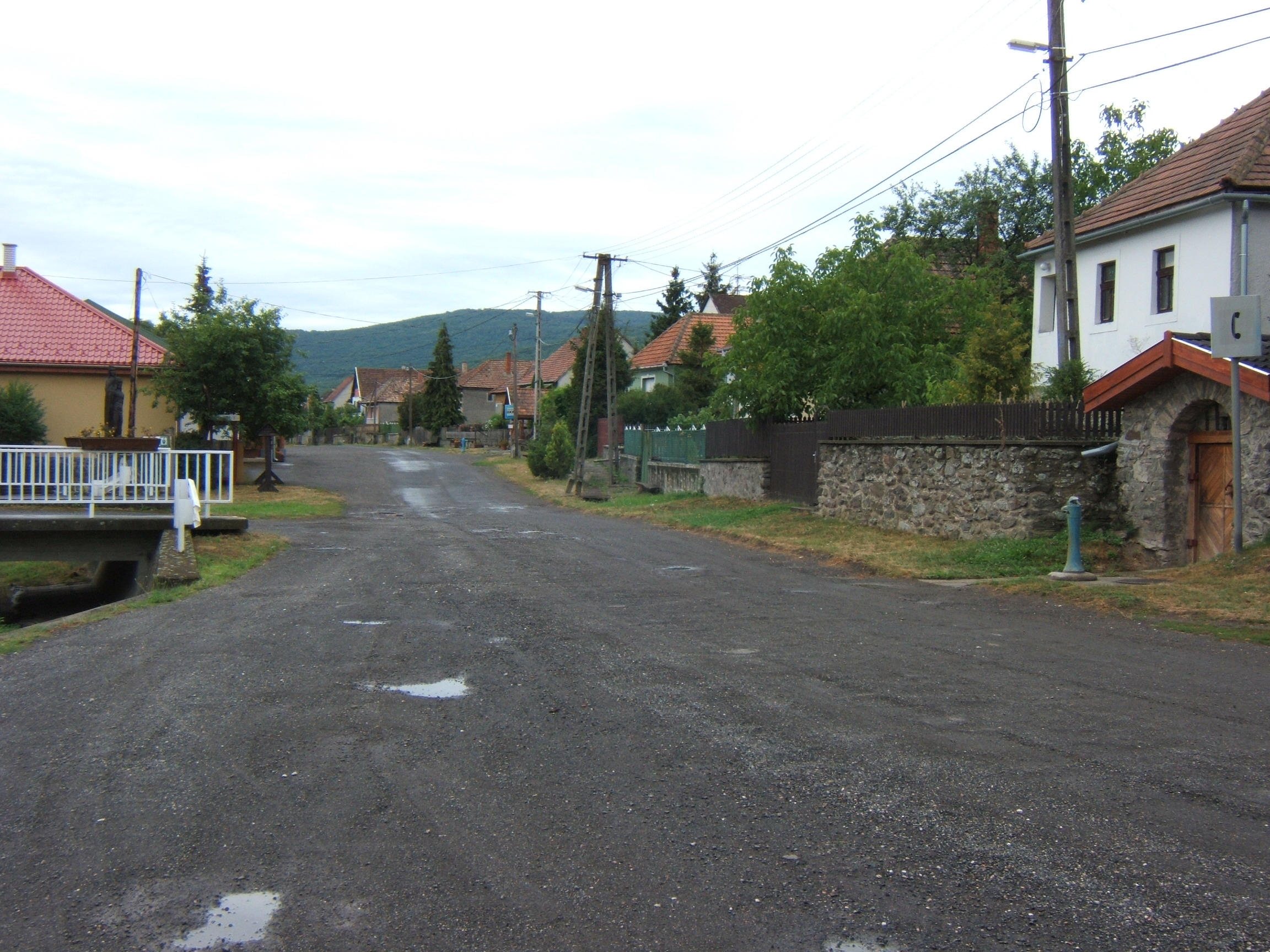

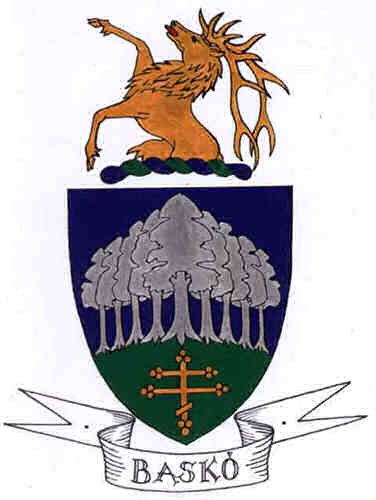
- Coat of arms

- Location of Baskó
- Coordinates: 48.33287°N 21.33663°E
- Country: Hungary
- County: Borsod-Abaúj-Zemplén

Area
  - Total: 29.64 km^{2} (11.44 sq mi)

Population (2004)
  - Total: 218
  - Density: 7.35/km^{2} (19.0/sq mi)
- Time zone: UTC+1 (CET)
  - Summer (DST): UTC+2 (CEST)
- Postal code: 3881
- Area code: 47

Baskó (Slovak: Baškov) is a village in Borsod-Abaúj-Zemplén county, Hungary.

== History ==
Baski and the surrounding area has been inhabited since ancient times. It was first mentioned in 1388 when it was part of the estate of Boldogkoi castle. The town's inhabitants lived by forestry.

In the 14th century, King Sigismund gave the Basko to the Czudar family.
