= Komlóska =

Komlóska Комловшка (Rusyn)
- Village
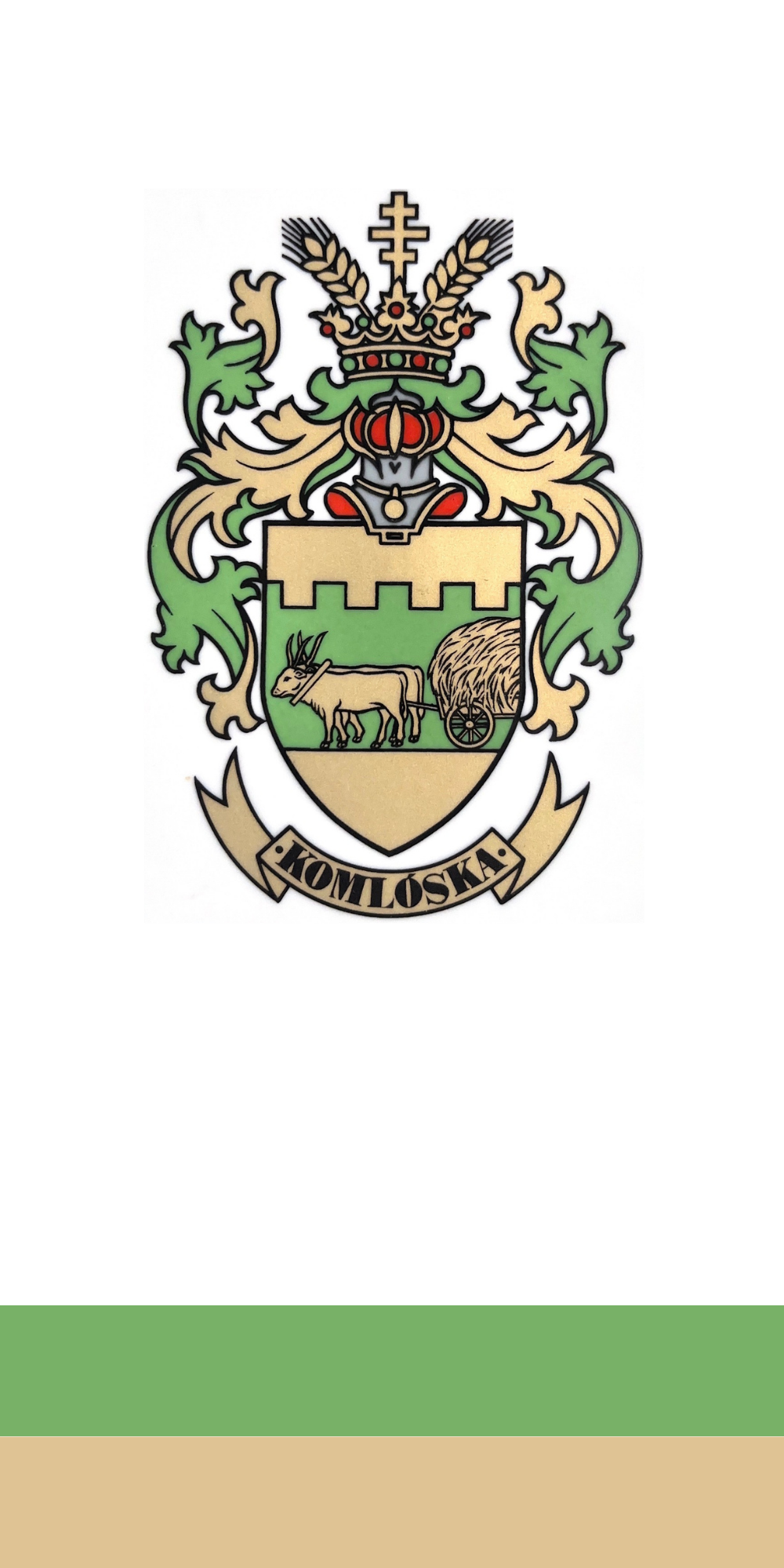
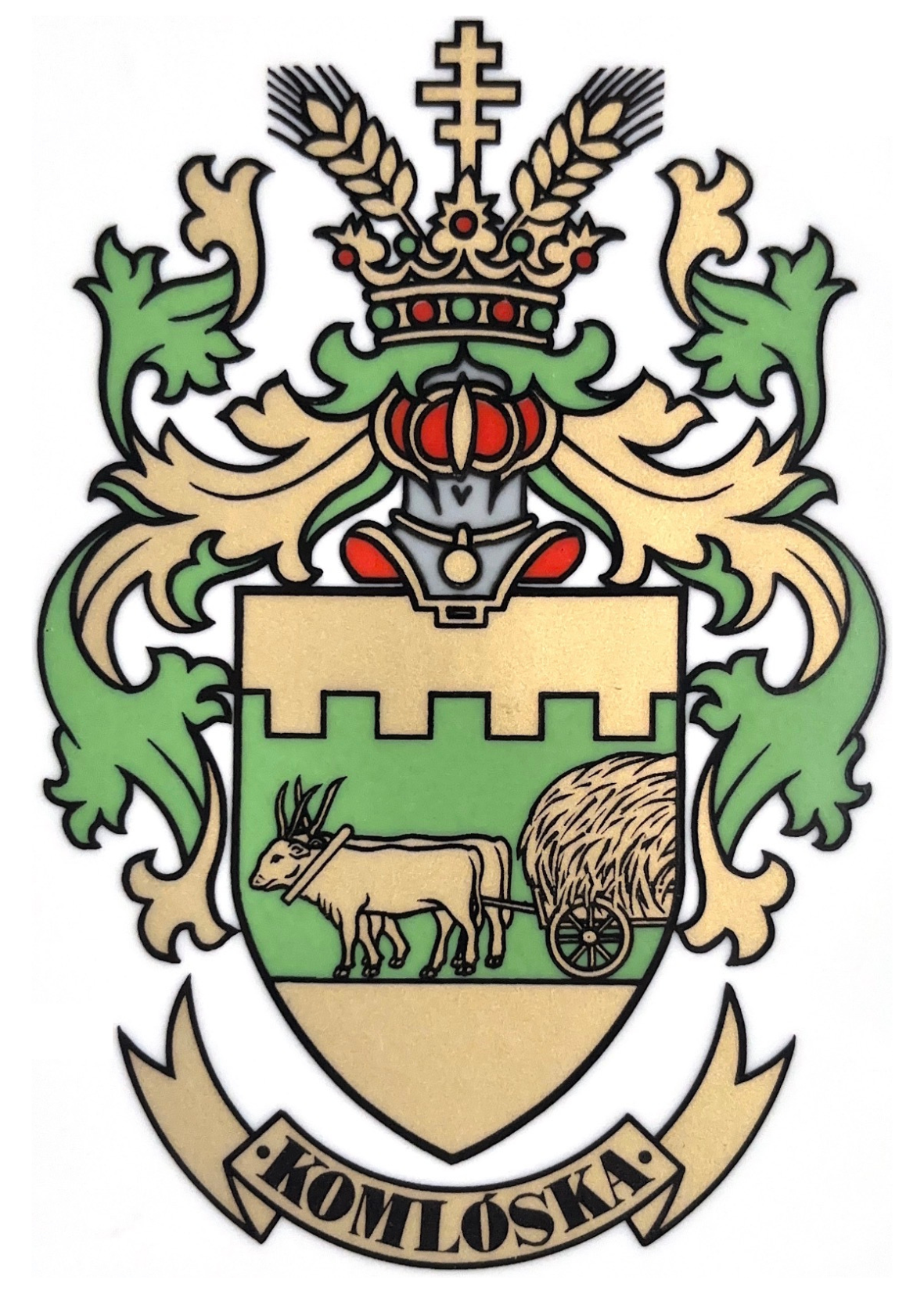
- Flag Coat of arms
- Interactive map of Komlóska
- Coordinates: 48°20′29″N 21°27′45″E
- Country: Hungary
- Regions: Northern Hungary
- County: Borsod-Abaúj-Zemplén County

Government
  - Mayor: Szilvia Haluska
  - Deputy Mayor: István Szűcs
  - Town Notary: Dr. Enikő Stumpf

Area
  - Total: 29.87 km^{2} (11.53 sq mi)

Population (2025)
  - Total: 217
  - Density: 7.26/km^{2} (18.8/sq mi)

Population by ethnicity (2022)
  - Hungarian: 87.2%
  - Rusyn: 26.9%
  - Slovak: 1.7%
  - German: 0.9%
  - Gypsy: 0.4%
  - Unreported: 12.8%

Population by religion (2022)
  - Greek Catholic: 59.8%
  - Roman Catholic: 6.4%
  - Reformed: 2.6%
  - Other: 1.3%
  - Non-religious: 1.7%
  - Unreported: 28.2%
- Time zone: UTC+1 (CET)
  - Summer (DST): UTC+2 (CEST)
- Postal code: 3937
- Area code: (+36) 47
- MP: László Lontay (TISZA)
- Website: komloska.hu

Komlóska (Rusyn: Комловшка; Slovak: Komlóška) is a village in Borsod-Abaúj-Zemplén County in northeastern Hungary.

== Geography ==
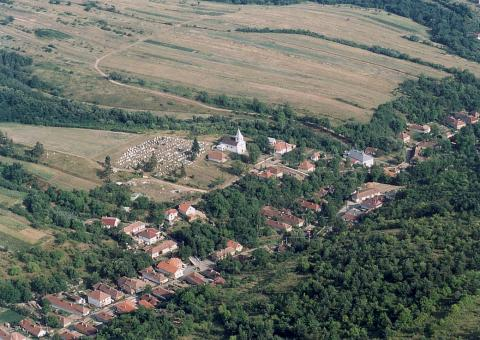
View of the village

It lies in one of the valleys of the Zemplén Mountains, about 70 kilometers northeast of Miskolc.

The neighboring settlements are: Makkoshotyka to the northeast, Hercegkút to the east, Sárospatak to the southeast, Bodrogolaszi and Tolcsva to the south, Erdőhorváti to the southwest, and Háromhuta to the northwest. It can only be reached by road from Erdőhorváti.

== History ==
The village's castle was first mentioned in 1379. According to Samu Borovszky's work Zemplén vármegye, the Hussites built a castle on a hill called Pusztavár, though by the early 1900s, few traces of it remained.

The village belonged to Abaúj County until 1884, when it was added to Zemplén County.

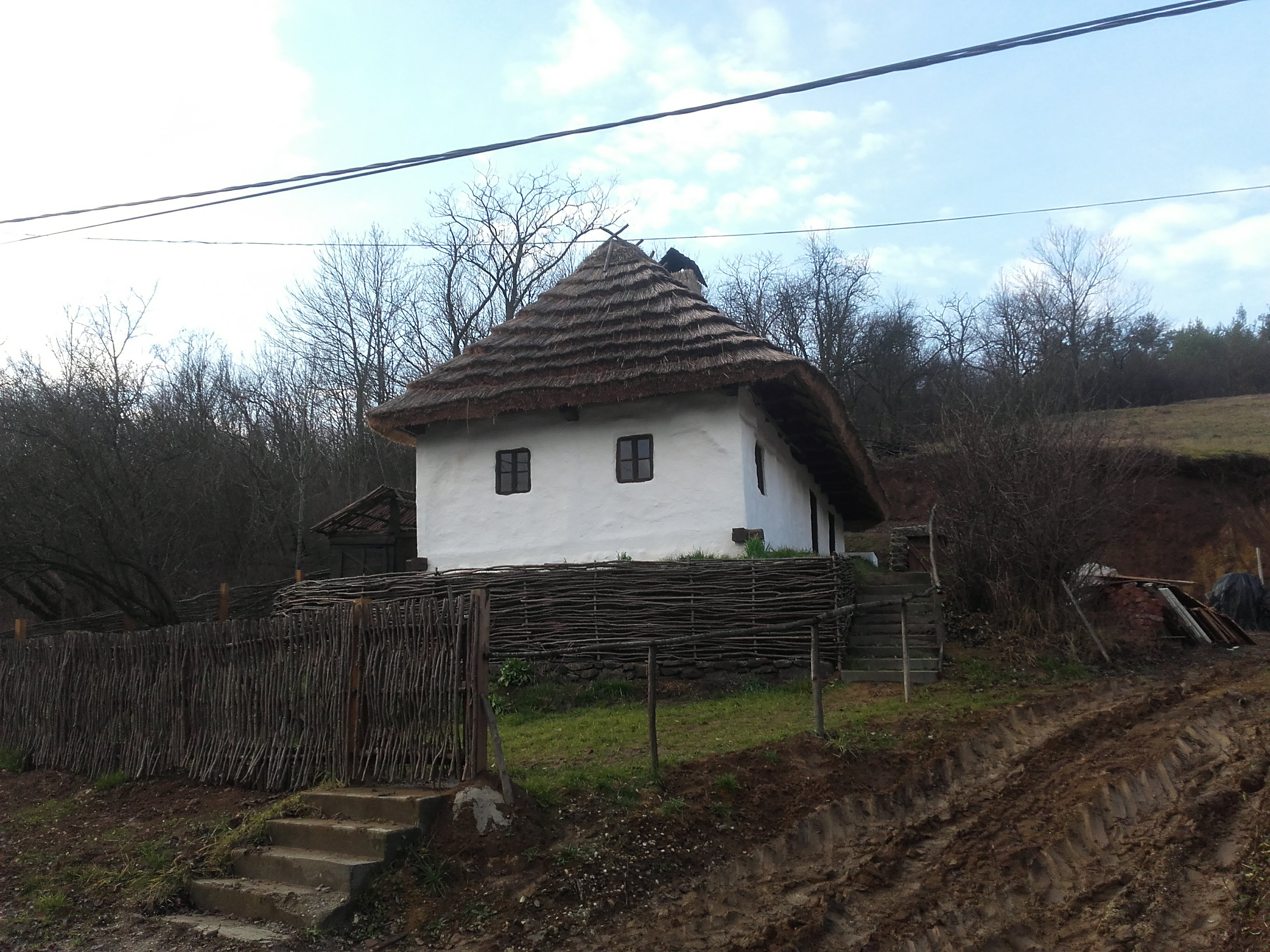
Traditional Rusyn house

The ancestors of the current Rusyn population of Komlóska, who speak the Lemko dialect, are believed to have arrived in the village after 1720. In 1773, it was listed as a Slavic-speaking settlement with a Greek Catholic parish.

=== Mining in Komlóska ===
Bentonite was first discovered in Hungary in Komlóska in 1936–1937 during exploratory tunnels driven in search of pyrite ore. The discovery resulted from investigations carried out between 1931 and 1936 by Béla and Ödön Várszély, quarry owners and mining prospectors who were searching for kaolin and pyrite.

The first important mining excavation was the Mária adit (Mária-tárna) on the eastern side of Bolhás Hill. It was opened to intersect calcite and quartz veins in the hope of reaching ore-bearing zones. Although no significant ore was found, the workings exposed a greenish material that was initially believed to be kaolin. Later studies showed that it was actually bentonite. Exploration in the Mária adit eventually ceased because of water accumulation and inadequate mine support.

Mining activity declined during the World War II, and the mine collapsed due to lack of maintenance. Exploration resumed in 1946, when shafts were sunk near the old Mária adit. By the end of that year approximately 10,000 tons of bentonite had been proven by exploration. Additional workings included the Ilona shaft (Ilona-akna), which operated intermittently between 1946 and 1949. In 1949 the bentonite mine was nationalized.

The quality of Komlóska bentonite was considered exceptional. It could be activated by both acidic and alkaline methods and was regarded as comparable to the best foreign bentonites from the United States and Romania. Its swelling properties made it valuable for oil-drilling muds, foundry sand production, clarifying oils, soil improvement, ceramics, and the chemical industry.

Despite promising reserves, the Komlóska bentonite mine was permanently closed in 1959. According to the study, the closure was not caused by exhaustion of the deposit but by the state decision to concentrate the production of similar mineral raw materials in the Mád area, closer to a planned grinding plant.

== Politics ==
The current mayor of Komlóska is Szilvia Haluska (independent). The local Municipal Assembly, elected at the 2024 local government elections, is made up of the mayor and 4 independent members.

=== List of mayors ===
List of village mayors from 1990:

Member	Party	Term of office
Ferenc Deák	KDNP	1990–1994
László Köteles	Independent	1994–1998
László Köteles	Zemplén Settlement Association	1998–2002
László Köteles	Independent	2002–2006
László Köteles	Independent	2006–2010
László Köteles	Fidesz–KDNP	2010–2014
László Köteles	Independent	2014–2019
Szilvia Haluska	Independent	2019–2024
Szilvia Haluska	Independent	2024–

== Transport ==
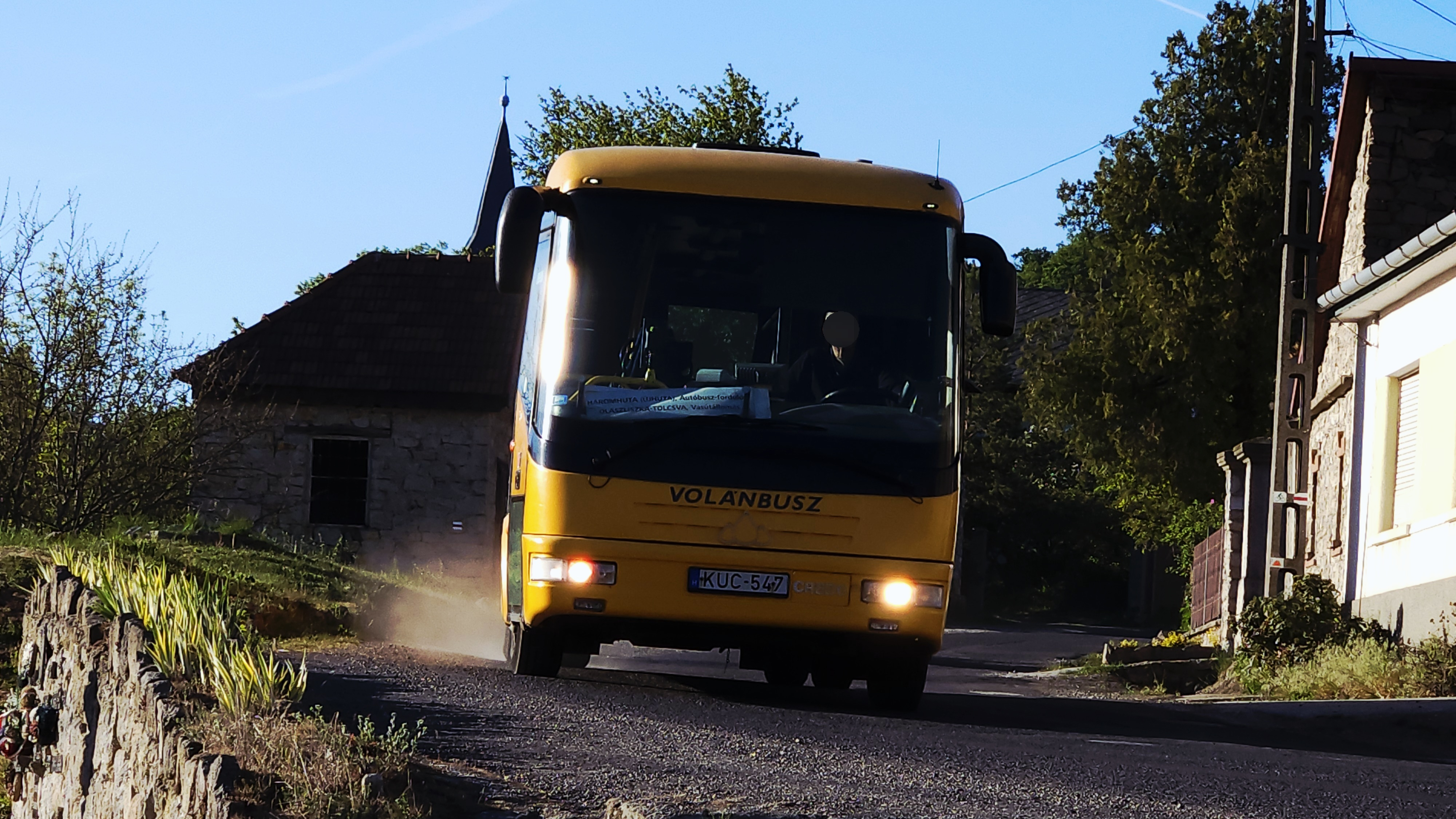
Bus 3884 arriving from Komlóska

=== Rail ===
The nearest train station is the Olaszliszka-Tolcsva station, located in Vámosújfalu, 11 km away by road.

=== Bus ===
There are two bus stops in Komlóska. The main bus stop is the Komlóska községi kút stop, from which buses depart for Sárospatak, Vámosújfalu, and Háromhuta.

== Gallery ==
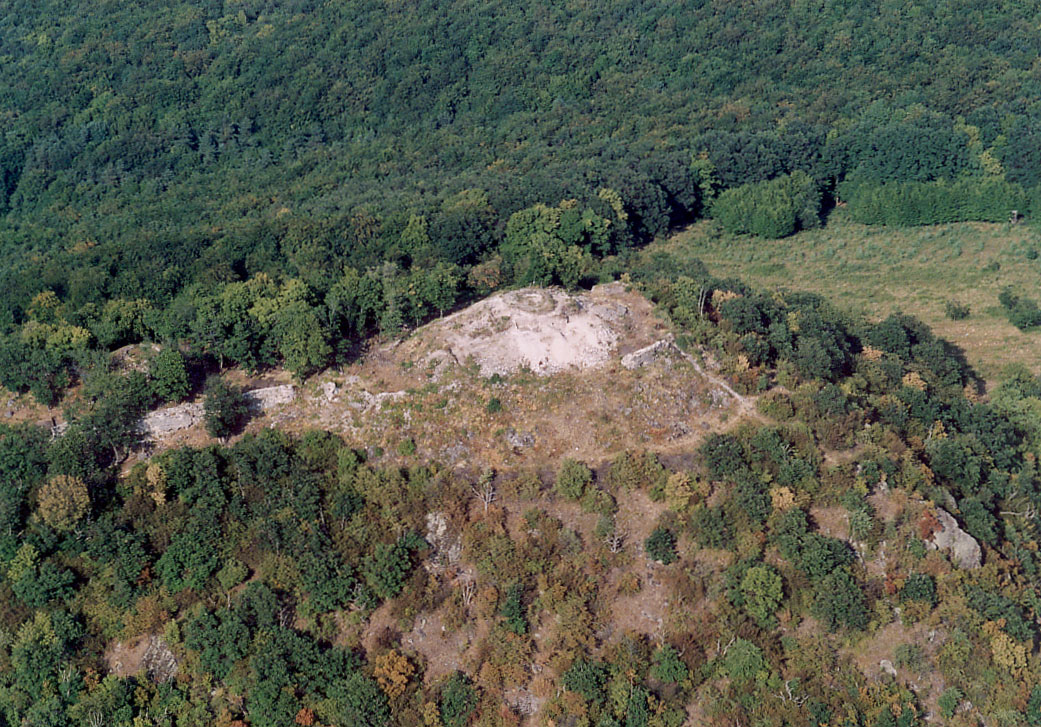
Solymos Castle

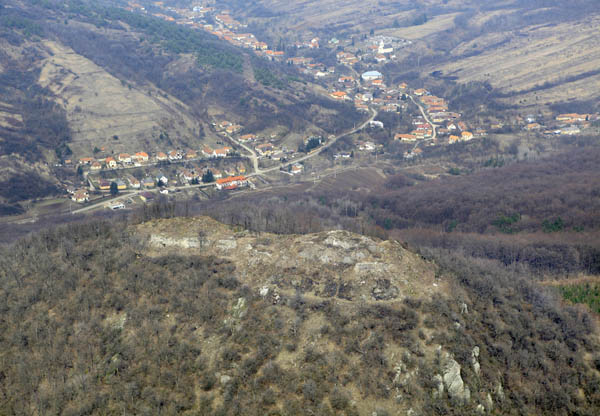

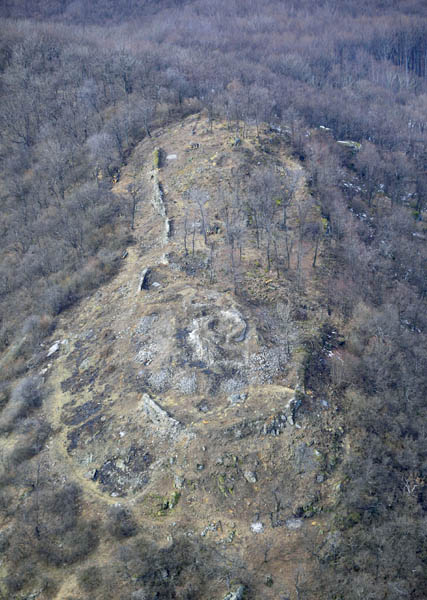

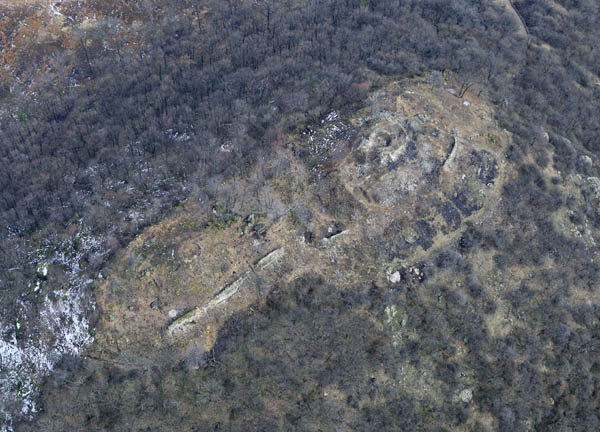

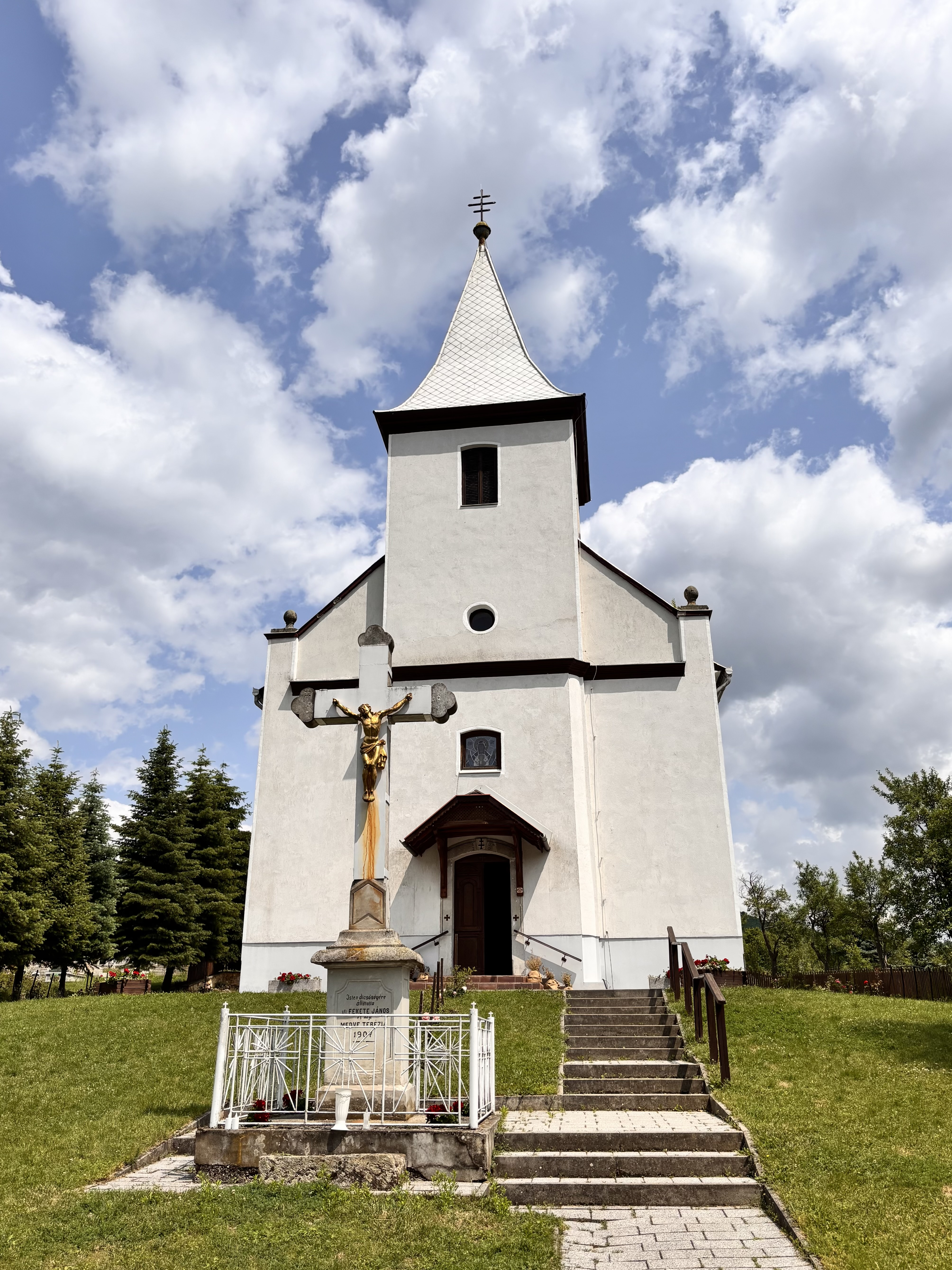
Greek Catholic Church
