= Háromhuta =

Háromhuta Tri Huty
- Village
- Flag Coat of arms

- Location of Háromhuta
- Coordinates: 48.37885°N 21.42946°E
- Country: Hungary
- Region: Northern Hungary
- County: Borsod-Abaúj-Zemplén
- District: Sárospatak

Area
  - Total: 37.79 km^{2} (14.59 sq mi)

Population (1 January 2025)
  - Total: 114
  - Density: 3.02/km^{2} (7.81/sq mi)

Population by ethnicity (2022)
  - Hungarian: 88,9%
  - Slovak: 4,3%
  - Ukrainian: 0,9%
  - Other: 3,4%
  - Unreported: 10,3%

Population by religion (2022)
  - Roman Catholic: 41,0%
  - Greek Catholic: 7,7%
  - Reformed: 6,0%
  - Other denomination: 0,9%
  - Non religious: 2,6%
  - Unreported: 41,9%
- Time zone: UTC+1 (CET)
  - Summer (DST): UTC+2 (CEST)
- Postal code: 3936
- Area code: (+36) 47
- Website: www.haromhuta.hu

Háromhuta (Slovak: Tri Huty) is a village in Borsod-Abaúj-Zemplén County in northeastern Hungary.

== Geography ==
It lies deep within the Zemplén Mountains, about 70 kilometers northeast of Miskolc by road.

The town consists of three separate parts, of which Óhuta (Stará Huta) is located farthest to the west, along the road that crosses the mountain range, while Középhuta (Stredná Huta) and Újhuta (Nová Huta) lie several kilometers east of the road.

The neighbouring settlements are Nagyhuta to the northeast, Makkoshotyka to the east, Komlóska to the southeast, Erdőhorváti to the south, Mogyoróska to the southwest, and Regéc to the west.

It can only be reached by road from Erdőhorváti or Regéc via Road 3716. This road runs only through the Óhuta; Középhuta and Újhuta can only be reached by turning off that road, via Road 37 135.

== History ==
The area belonged to Regéc, and glass manufacturing took place here between 1698 and 1916; as a result, three distinct parts of the settlement developed. These parts separated from Regéc in the 19th century and joined together to form an independent municipality.

== Gallery ==
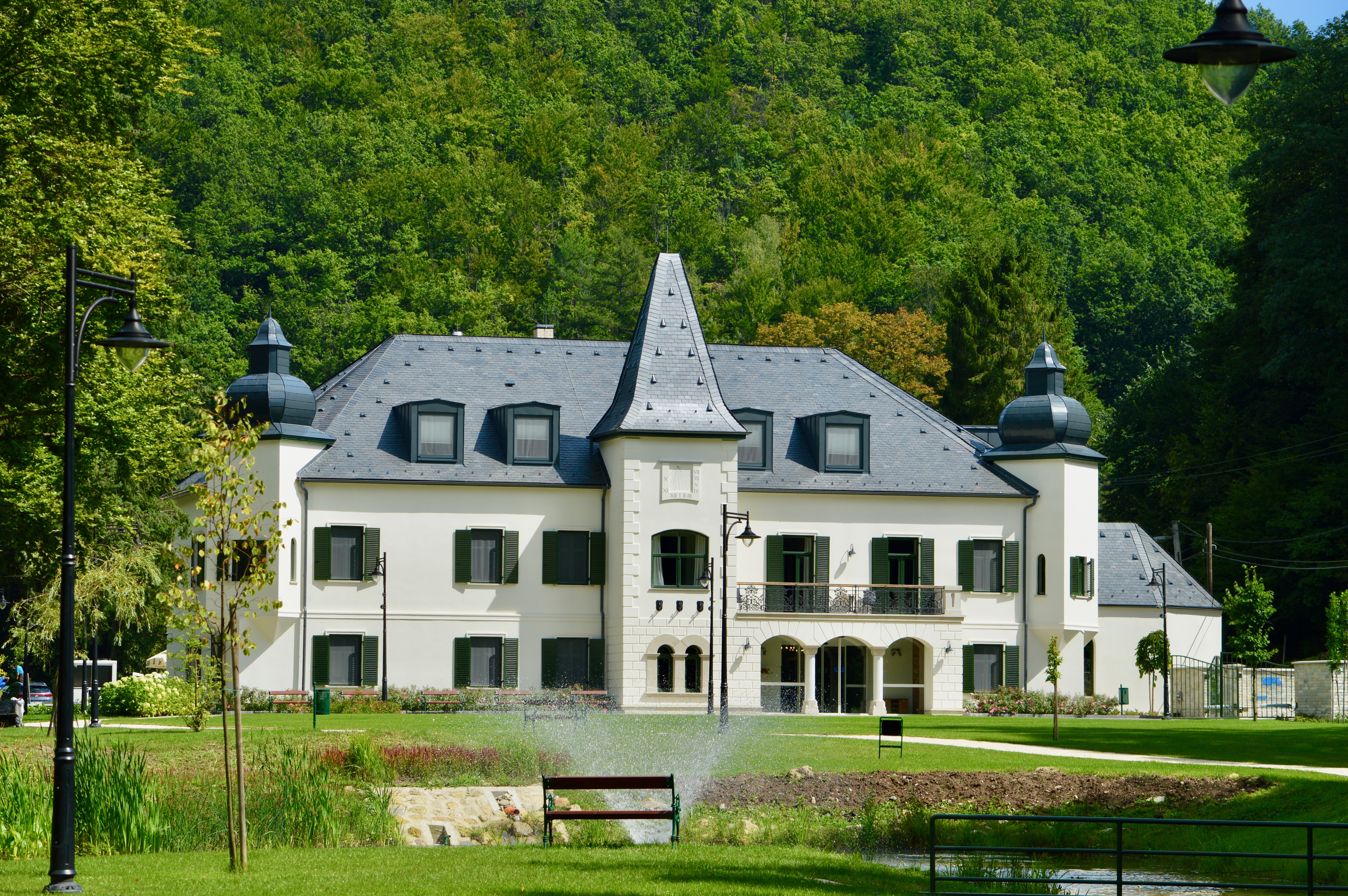
Bretzeinheim-Waldbott Hunting Lodge (Újhuta Castle)

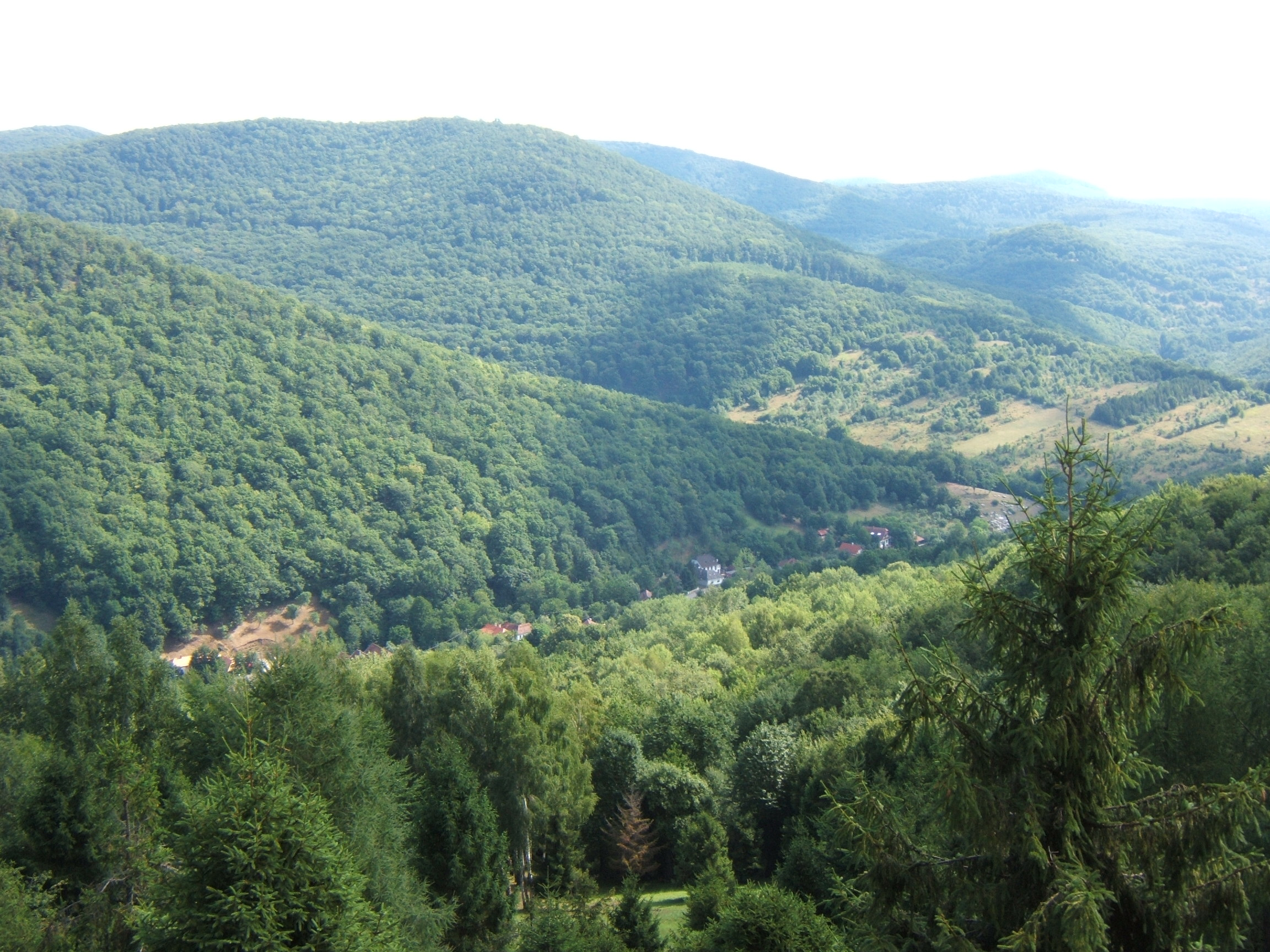
View of Óhuta

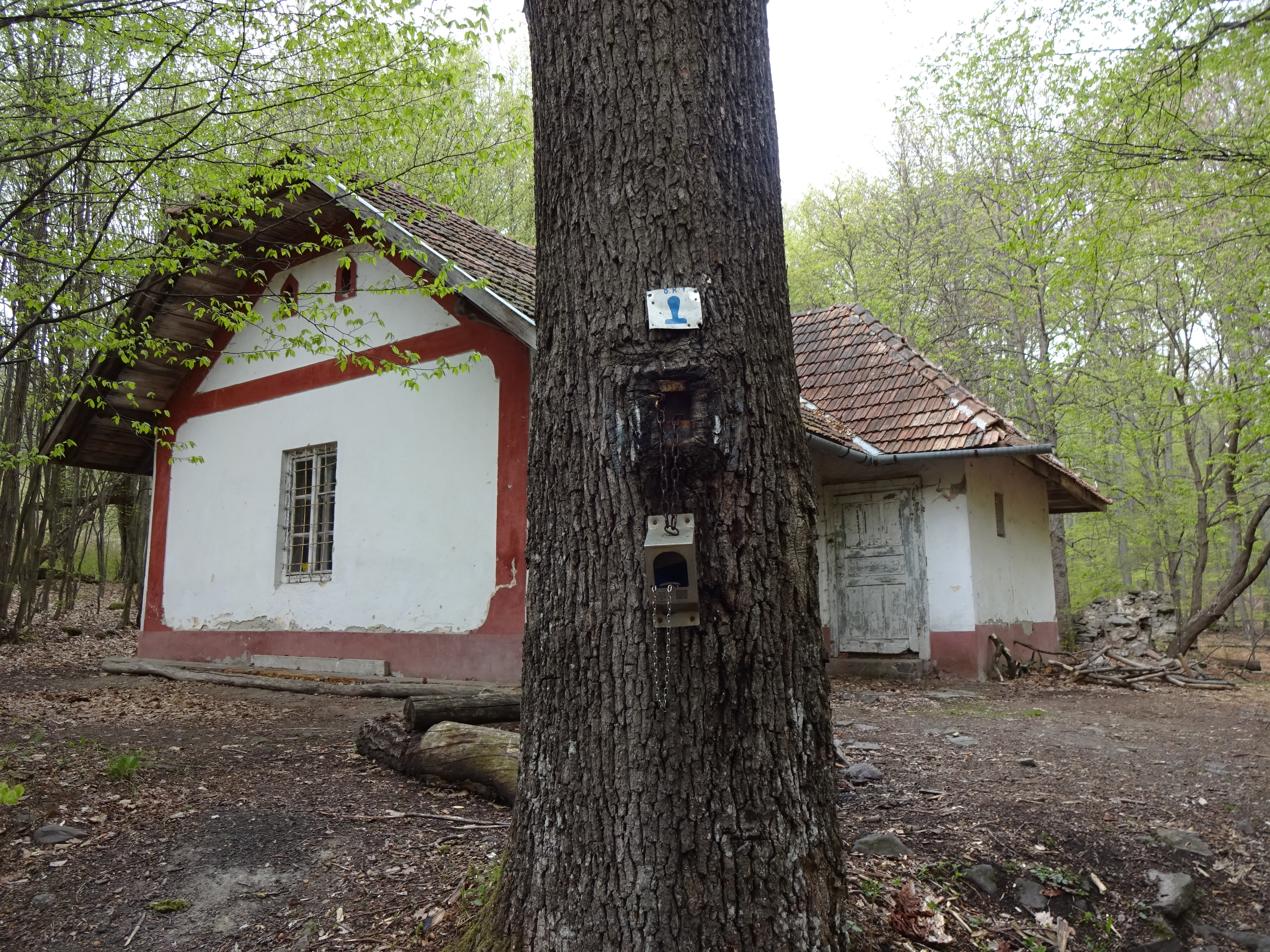
National Blue Trail stamp station

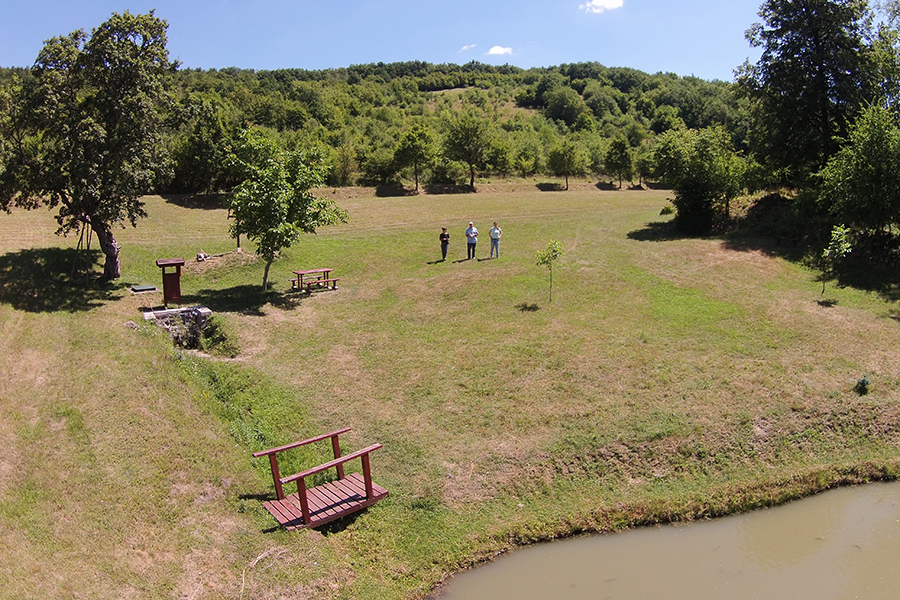
Ruins of a Pauline Monastery

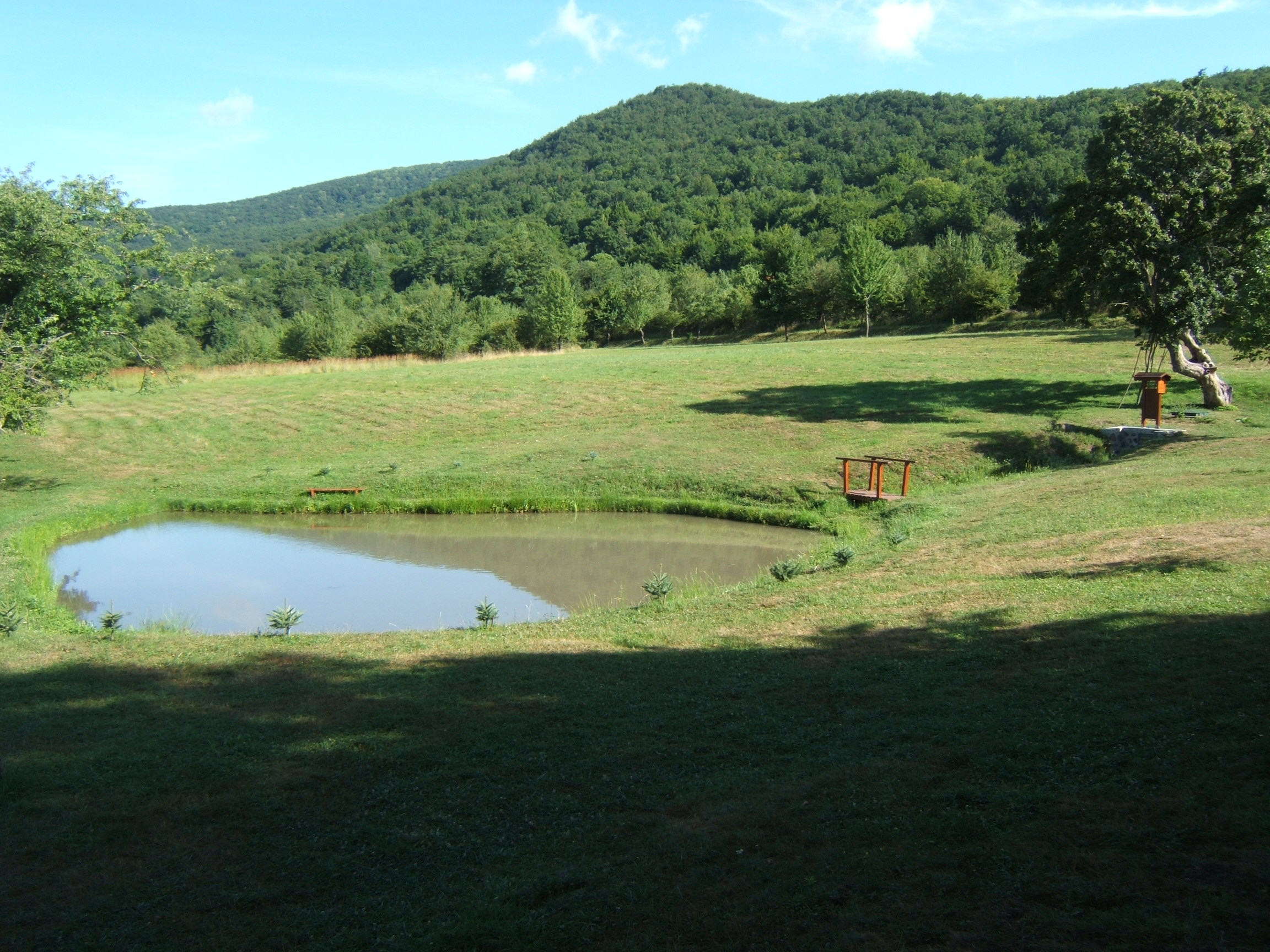
Pauline spring
