= Sárospatak District =

Coordinates: 48.3000°N 21.5167°E

Sárospatak District Sárospataki járás
- Districts of Hungary
- Coat of arms

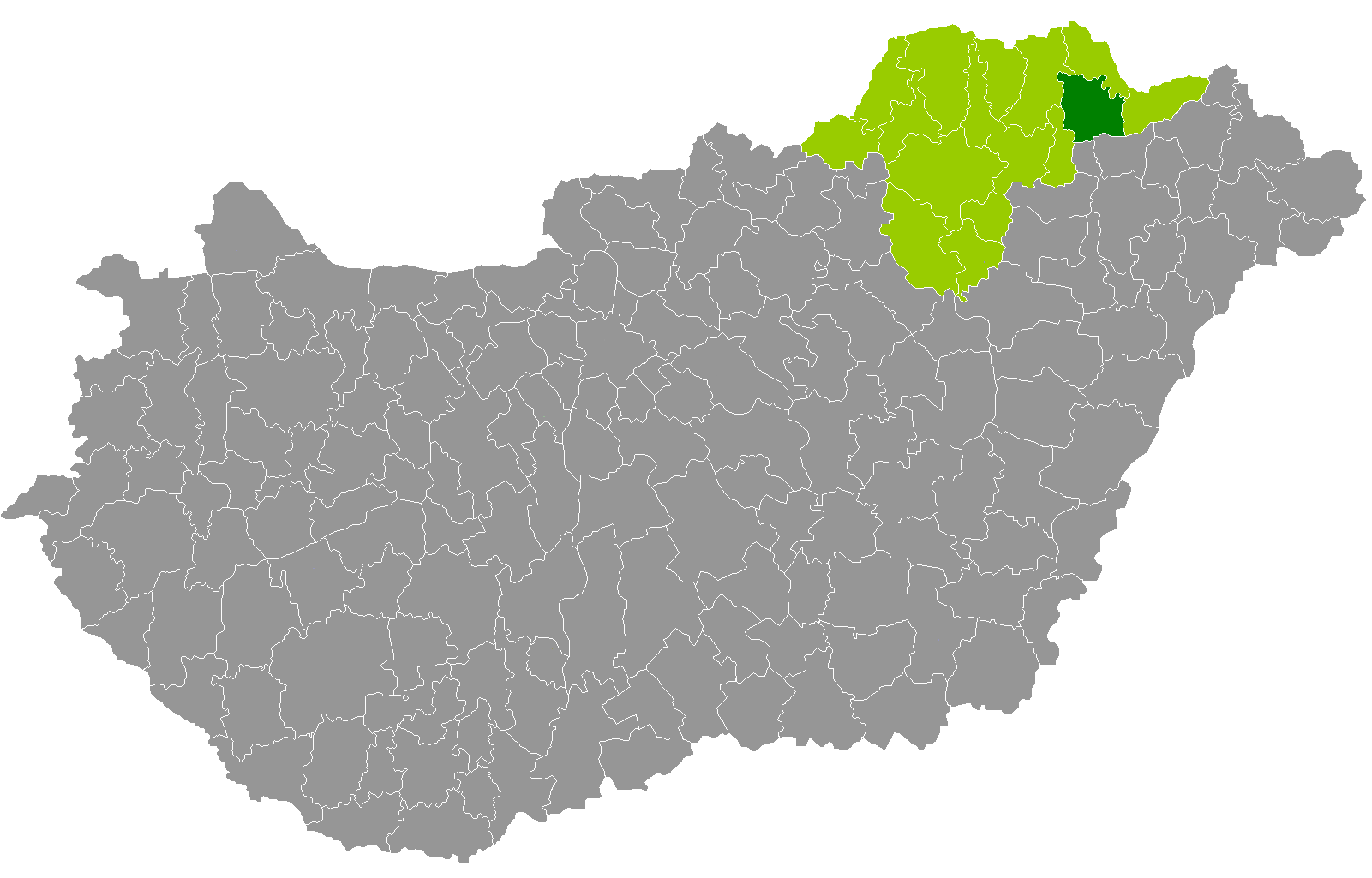
- Sárospatak District within Hungary and Borsod-Abaúj-Zemplén County.
- Country: Hungary
- County: Borsod-Abaúj-Zemplén
- District seat: Sárospatak

Area
  - Total: 477.67 km^{2} (184.43 sq mi)
  - Rank: 5th in Borsod-Abaúj-Zemplén

Population (2011 census)
  - Total: 24,946
  - Rank: 8th in Borsod-Abaúj-Zemplén
  - Density: 52/km^{2} (130/sq mi)

Sárospatak (Hungarian: Sárospataki járás) is a district in north-eastern part of Borsod-Abaúj-Zemplén County. Sárospatak is also the name of the town where the district seat is found. The district is located in the Northern Hungary Statistical Region.

== Geography ==
Sárospatak District borders with Sátoraljaújhely District to the north, Cigánd District to the east, Ibrány District and Nyíregyháza District (Szabolcs-Szatmár-Bereg County) to the south, Tokaj District and Gönc District to the west. The number of the inhabited places in Sárospatak District is 16.

== Municipalities ==
The district has 1 town and 15 villages. (ordered by population, as of 1 January 2012)

- Bodrogolaszi (882)
- Erdőhorváti (545)
- Györgytarló (563)
- Háromhuta (125)
- Hercegkút (624)
- Kenézlő (1,229)
- Komlóska (237)
- Makkoshotyka (869)
- Olaszliszka (1,661)
- Sárazsadány (249)
- **Sárospatak** (12,590) – district seat
- Tolcsva (1,681)
- Vajdácska (1,302)
- Vámosújfalu (857)
- Viss (631)
- Zalkod (201)

The bolded municipality is the city.

== Demographics ==
Religion in Sárospatak District (2011 census)
1. Catholic Church (33.6%)
2. Greek Catholicism (13.4%)
3. Calvinism (22.4%)
4. Lutheranism (0.10%)
5. Other religions (1.30%)
6. Non-religious (4.00%)
7. Atheists (0.40%)
8. Undeclared (24.8%)

In 2011, it had a population of 24,946 and the population density was 52/km².

Year	County population	Change
2011	24,946	n/a

=== Ethnicity ===
Besides the Hungarian majority, the main minorities are the Roma (approx. 1,500), German (650) and Rusyn (350).

Total population (2011 census): 24,946
Ethnic groups (2011 census): Identified themselves: 23,789 persons:

- Hungarians: 21,009 (88.31%)
- Gypsies: 1,502 (6.31%)
- Germans: 629 (2.64%)
- Rusyns: 359 (1.51%)
- Others and indefinable: 290 (1.22%)

Approx. 1,000 people in Sárospatak District did not declare their ethnic group at the 2011 census.

=== Religion ===
Religious adherence in the county according to 2011 census:

- Catholic – 11,714 (Roman Catholic – 8,376; Greek Catholic – 3,331);
- Reformed – 5,600;
- Evangelical – 36;
- other religions – 332;
- Non-religious – 1,009;
- Atheism – 100;
- Undeclared – 6,155.

== Gallery ==
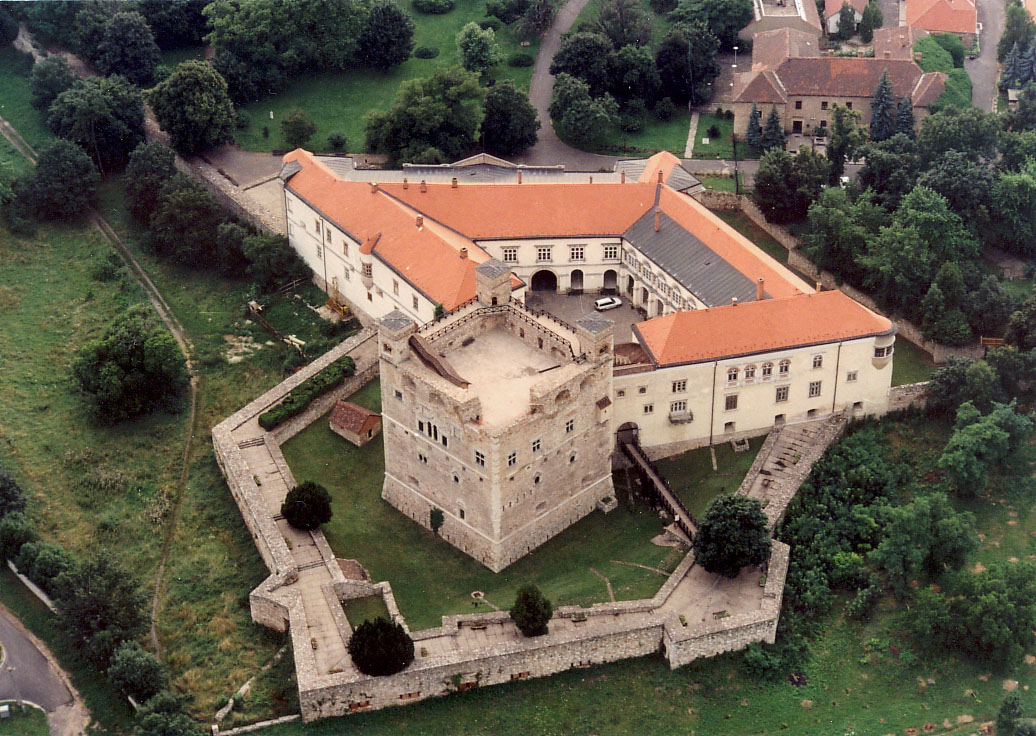
Sárospatak Castle

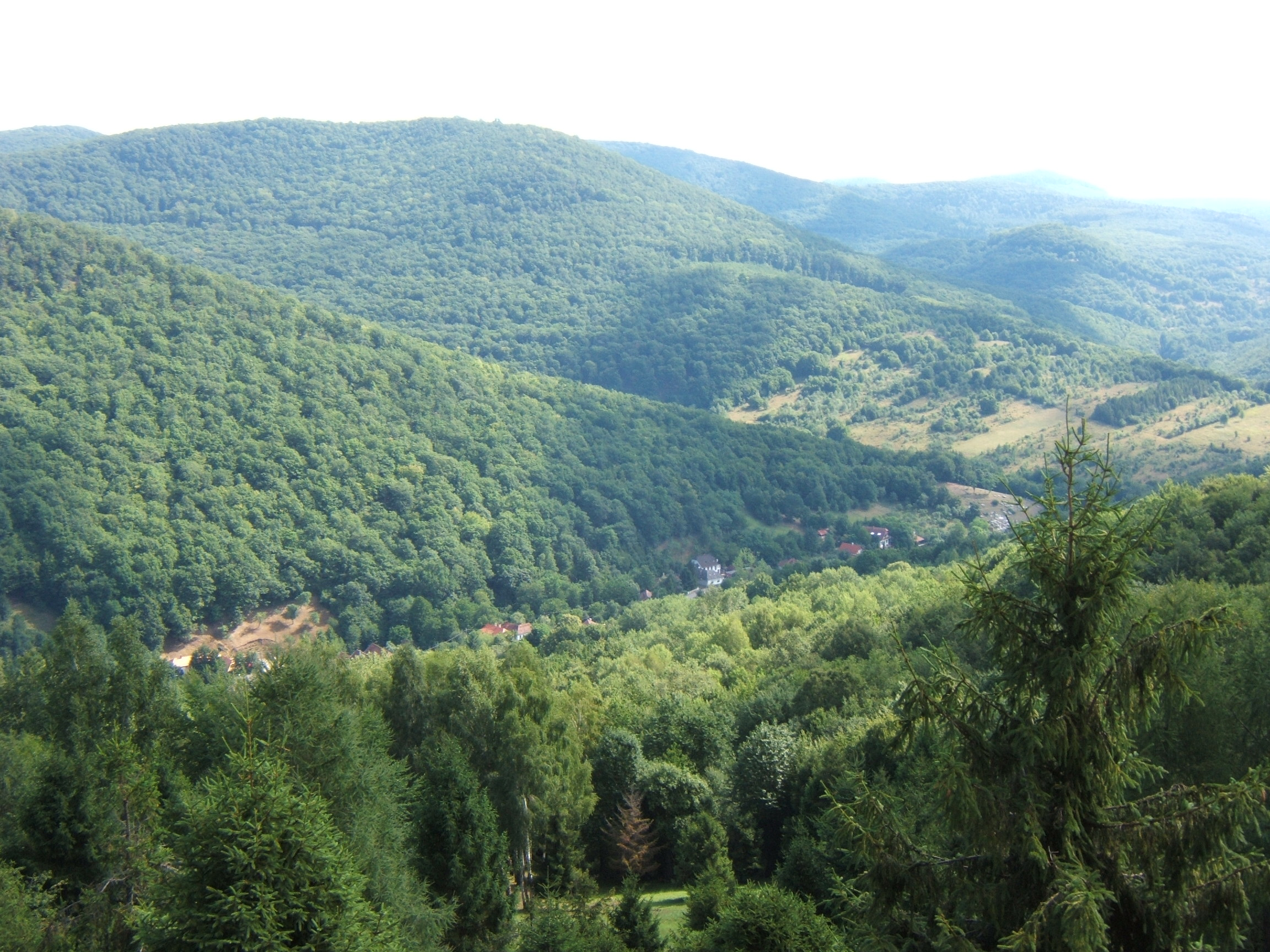
Aerial view of Háromhuta (Óhuta)

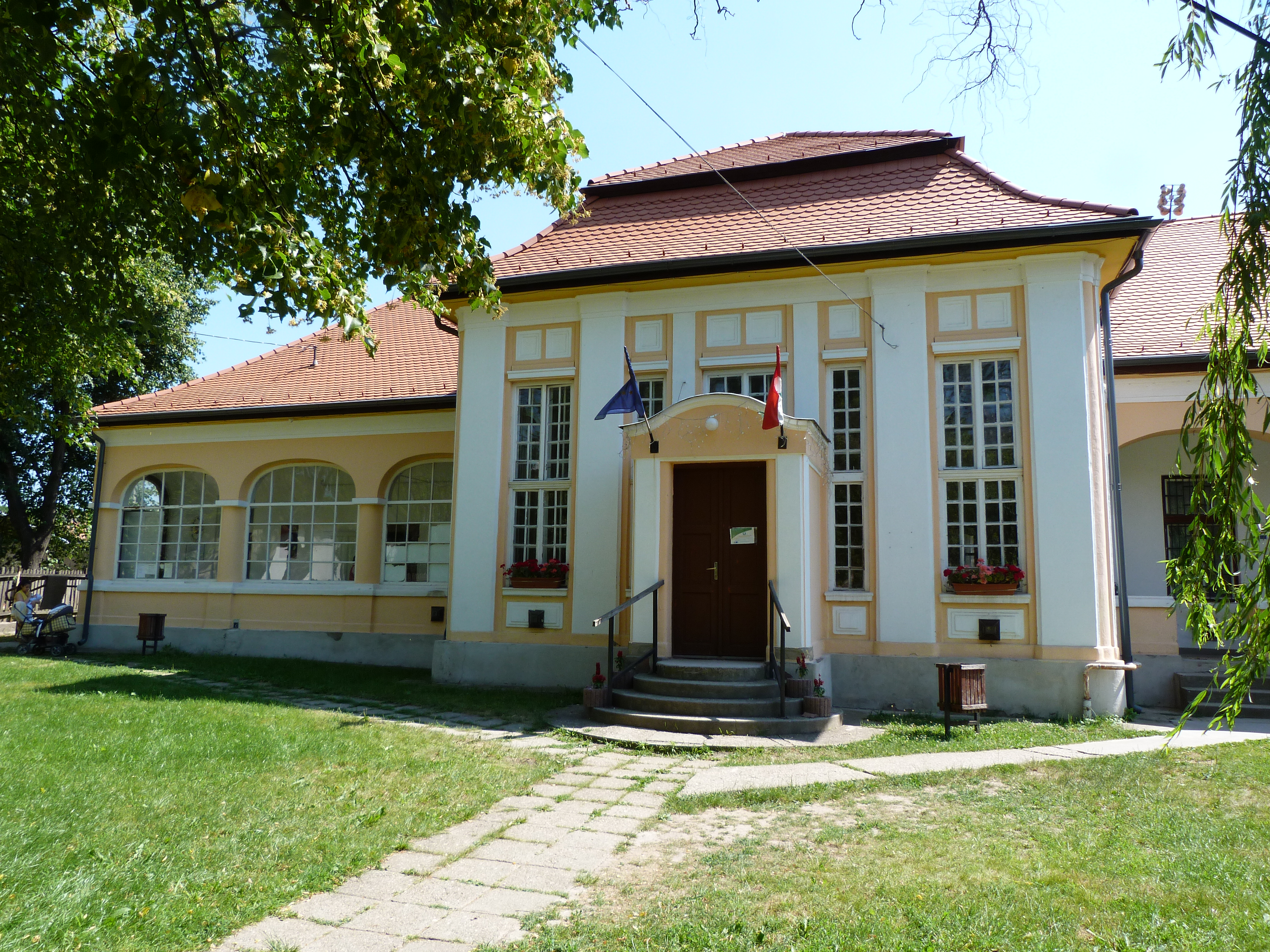
Meczner Mansion in Makkoshotyka

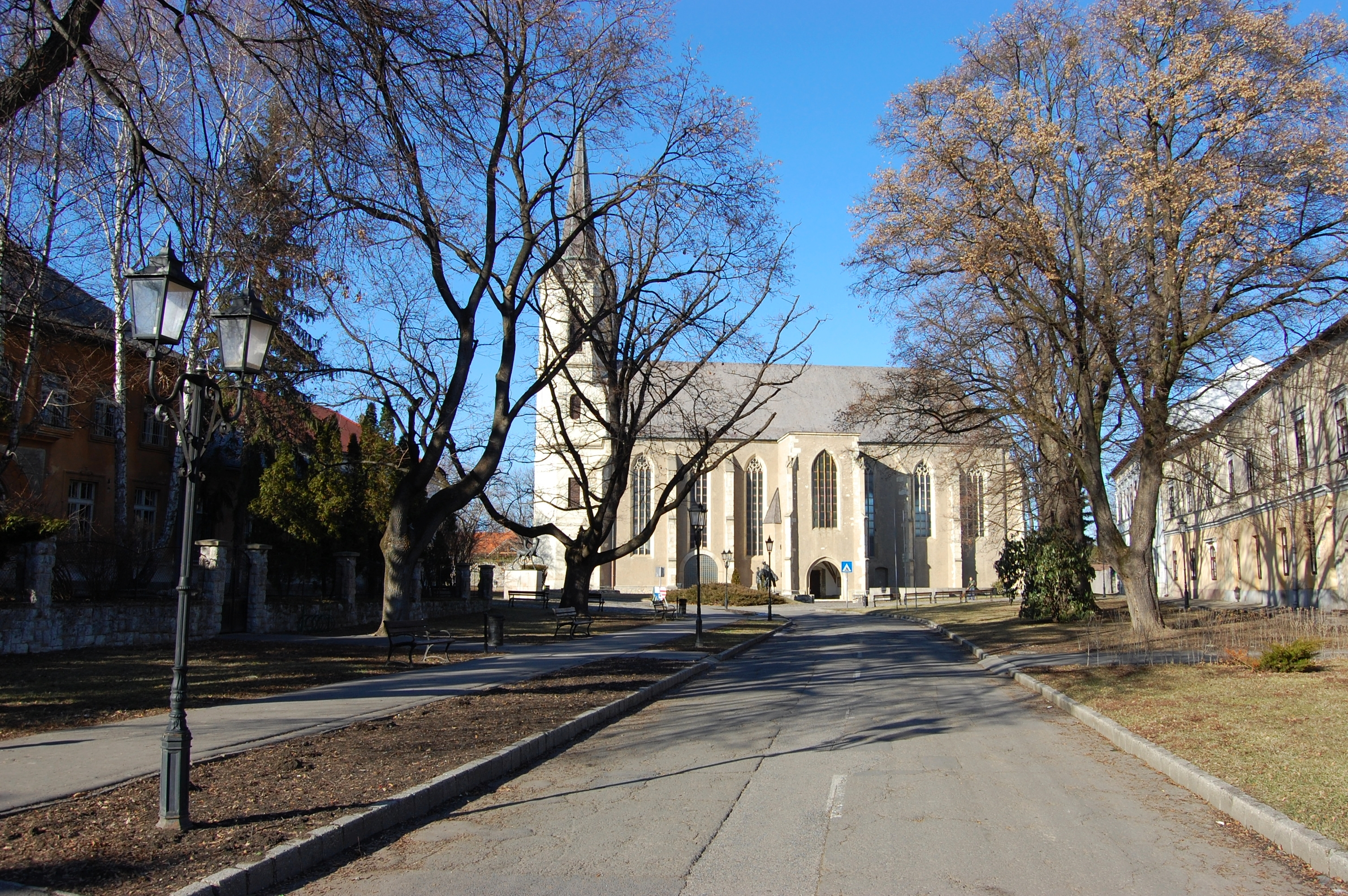
Castle Church in Sárospatak

== See also ==
- List of cities and towns of Hungary
