= Olaszliszka =

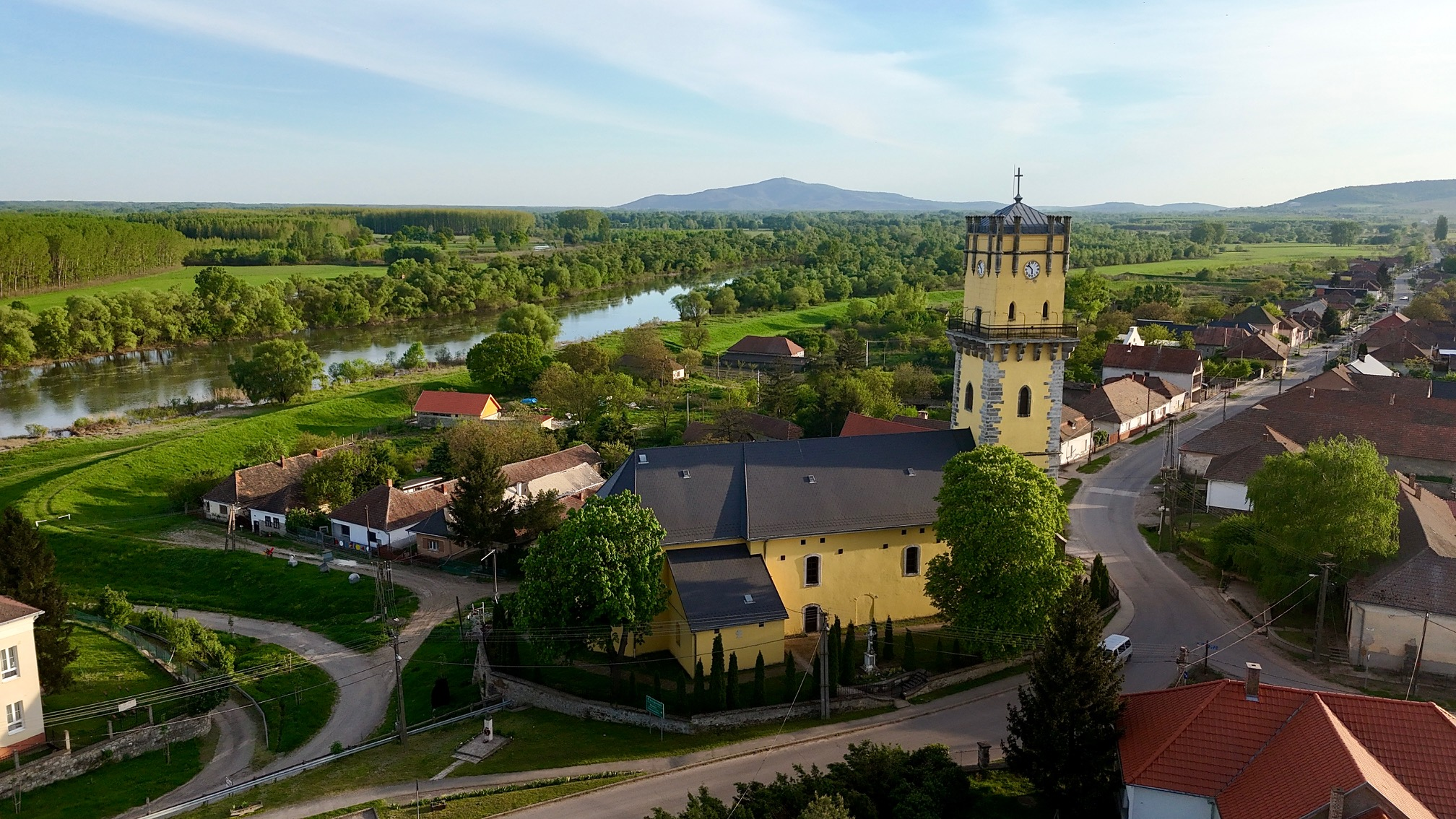
- Gothic Catholic church

- Coat of arms

- Location of Olaszliszka in Borsod-Abaúj-Zemplén County Location of Olaszliszka in Hungary
- Coordinates: 48.24265°N 21.43018°E
- Country: Hungary
- Regions: Northern Hungary
- County: Borsod-Abaúj-Zemplén
- District: Sárospatak

Government
  - Mayor: Béla Varga

Area
  - Total: 39.46 km^{2} (15.24 sq mi)

Population (2025)
  - Total: 1,496
  - Density: 37.91/km^{2} (98.19/sq mi)

Population by ethnicity (2022)
  - Hungarian: 91,7%
  - Gypsy: 7,2%
  - Slovak: 0,6%
  - German: 0,1%
  - Rusyn: 0,1%
  - Romanian: 0,1%
  - Other: 1,6%
  - Unreported: 8,3%

Population by religion (2022)
  - Roman Catholic: 35,4%
  - Reformed: 19,5%
  - Greek Catholic: 5,9%
  - Other Christian: 0,8%
  - Lutheran: 0,3%
  - Other Catholic: 0,3%
  - Non religious: 4,9%
  - Unreported: 32,9%
- Time zone: UTC+1 (CET)
  - Summer (DST): UTC+2 (CEST)
- Postal code: 3933
- Area code: 47
- Website: olaszliszka.hu

Olaszliszka is a village in Borsod-Abaúj-Zemplén county, Hungary.

== Geography ==
It lies at the edge of the Zemplén Mountains, on the right bank of the Bodrog, surrounded by vineyards, in the Tokaj-Hegyalja wine region, about 57 kilometers east of Miskolc.

The neighboring settlements are: Erdőhorváti to the north, Vámosújfalu and Tolcsva to the northeast, Viss — located on the opposite bank of the Bodrog — to the southeast, Zalkod to the south, Szegilong, Szegi, and Bodrogkisfalud to the southwest, and Erdőbénye to the northwest.

The most important road access route is Main Road 37, which runs in a southwest-northeast direction along the village’s borders, bypassing the center by a few hundred meters from the northwest.

The Budapest–Sátoraljaújhely railway line runs through the area, but there is no train stop in the village. The nearest train station is the Olaszliszka-Tolcsva station, which is located in Vámosújfalu. The village is connected to Viss and Zalkod only by ferry.

== History ==
It was first mentioned in 1239, in a letter from King Béla IV, under the name Lyska. Béla IV settled Italian – or, according to other sources, Walloon – vine growers in the area, and from then on it was known as Olaszliszka. (Olasz means “Italian” in Hungarian.)

In 1320, King Charles I granted market privileges to the settlement, which by then was known as Liszka Olaszi. In 1466, King Matthias I granted Liszka Olaszi town status, allowing it to hold three free fairs a year.

The Olaszliszka lynching (Olaszliszkai lincselés), a notorious violent incident took place in the village on October 15, 2006. A teacher, Lajos Szögi, accidentally struck a young romani girl with his car. Although the girl was not seriously injured, several local residents mistakenly believed that she had been badly hurt or killed. The relatives of the girl attacked the teacher, beating him to death. The case became one of the most widely discussed criminal cases in modern Hungarian history.

=== Jewish history of the village ===
The Jewish community of Olaszliszka began to grow in importance in the life of the settlement starting in the mid-18th century. The first Jewish families settled here in the 1740s, and over the decades they established a thriving community.

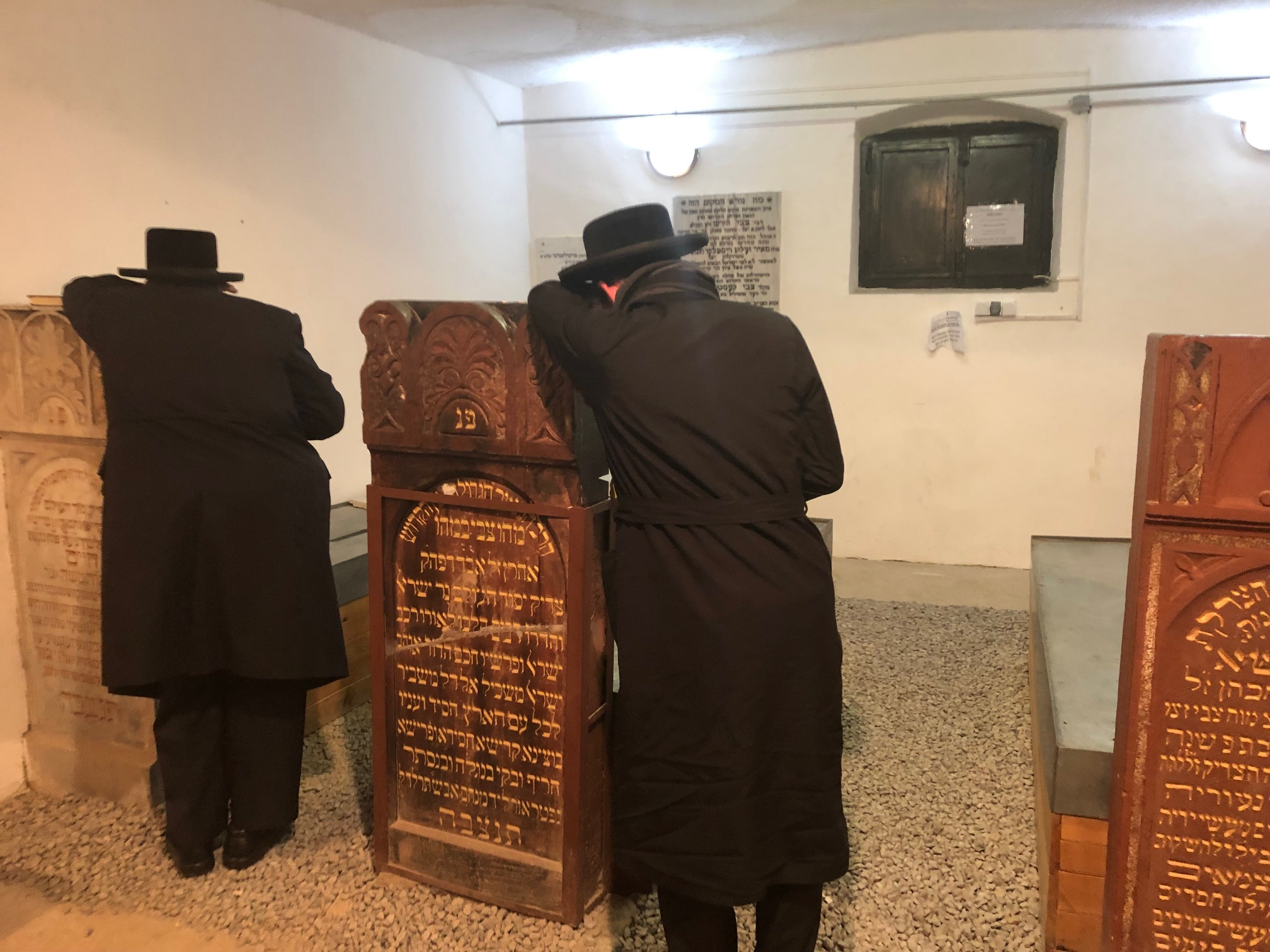
Hasidic Jewish pilgrims pray at Rabbi Tzvi Hirsch Friedman’s grave

In the 1830s the Orthodox Jewish community numbered 70 families, 312 members altogether. Among them were 57 tax-paying citizens: 1 entrepreneur, 17 small businessmen, 2 farmers, 2 civil servants, 2 self-employed, 5 freelance artists, 8 blue collar workers, 20 engaged in various other forms of employment.

In 1872, local authorities and neighboring counties contributed financial support to a Jewish elementary school, which served 36 students under a single teacher. The community also maintained a Talmud Torah with 25 students and provided housing and meals for many of them.

At the center of the village's spiritual life stood Rabbi Tzvi Hirsch Friedman, a scholar who became one of the leading figures of Hasidism in Hungary. Through his teachings and influence, Olaszliszka emerged as an important center of Hasidic Judaism.

Following the death of the rabbi, the community began to decline. After World War II, the synagogue was destroyed. An interactive memorial was built on the site of the synagogue in 2015, evoking the former building and honoring the Jewish community of the region.

== Gallery ==
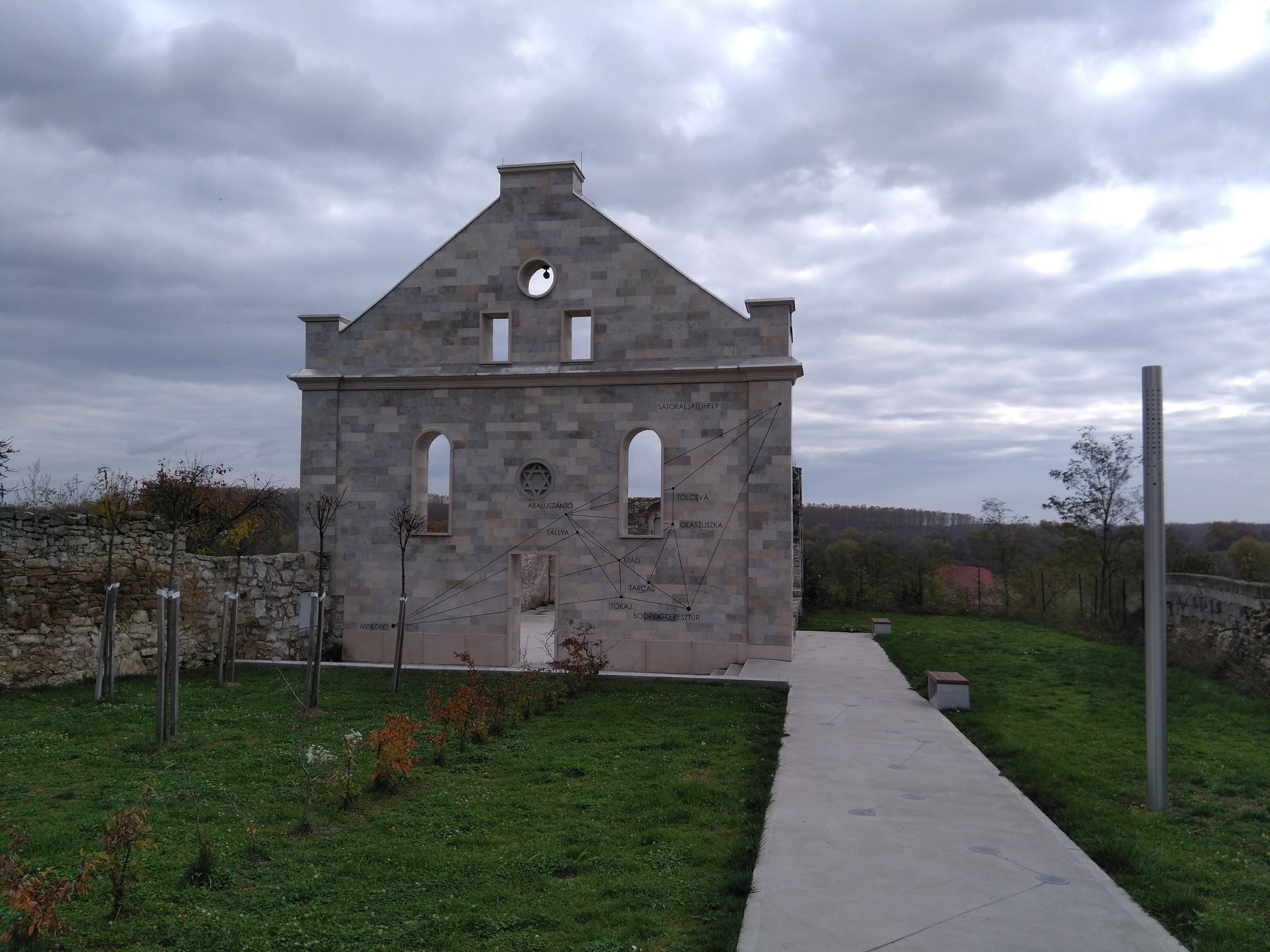
Memorial of the former Synagogue

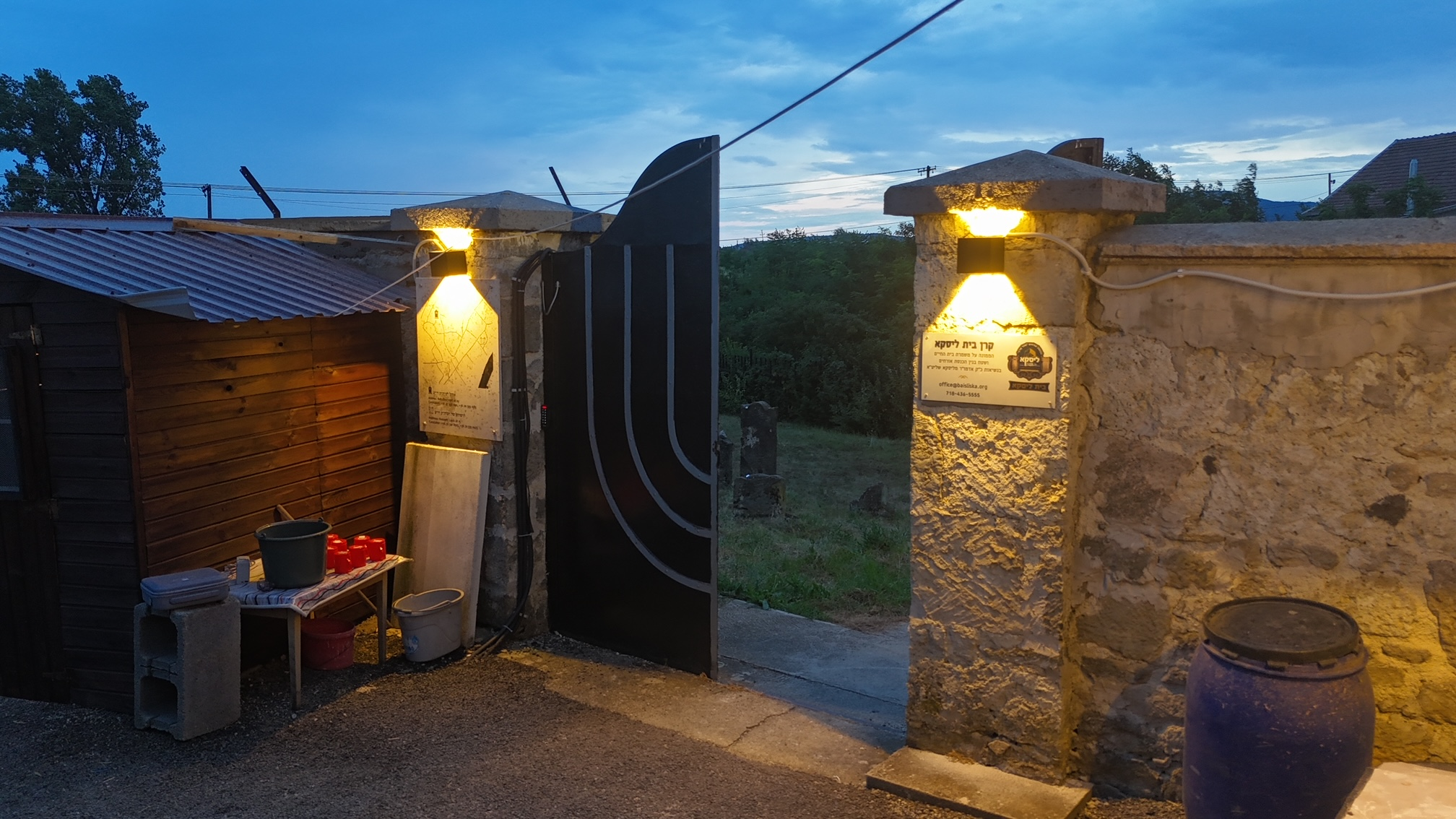
Entrance of the Jewish cemetery

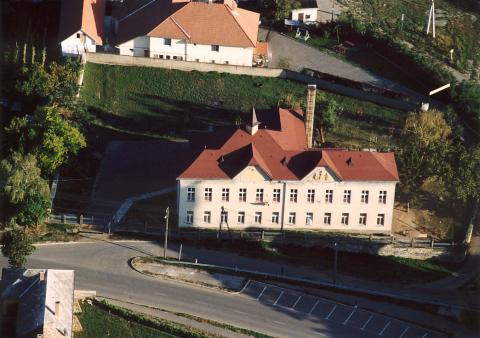
Elementary school

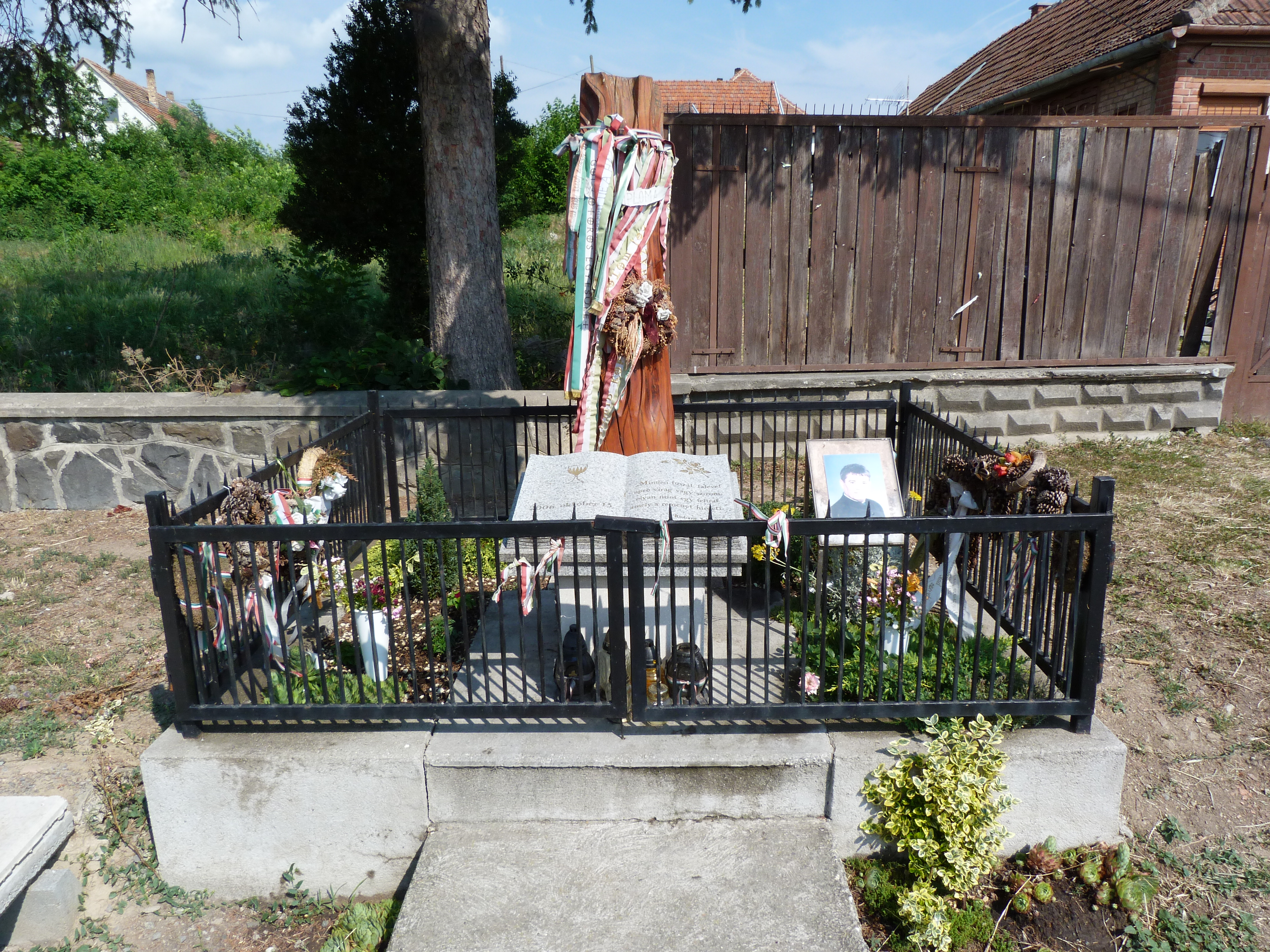
Memorial to Lajos Szögi

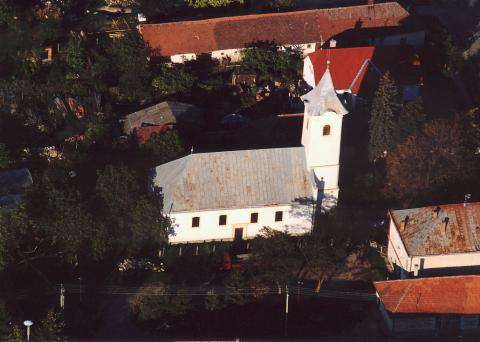
Reformed church

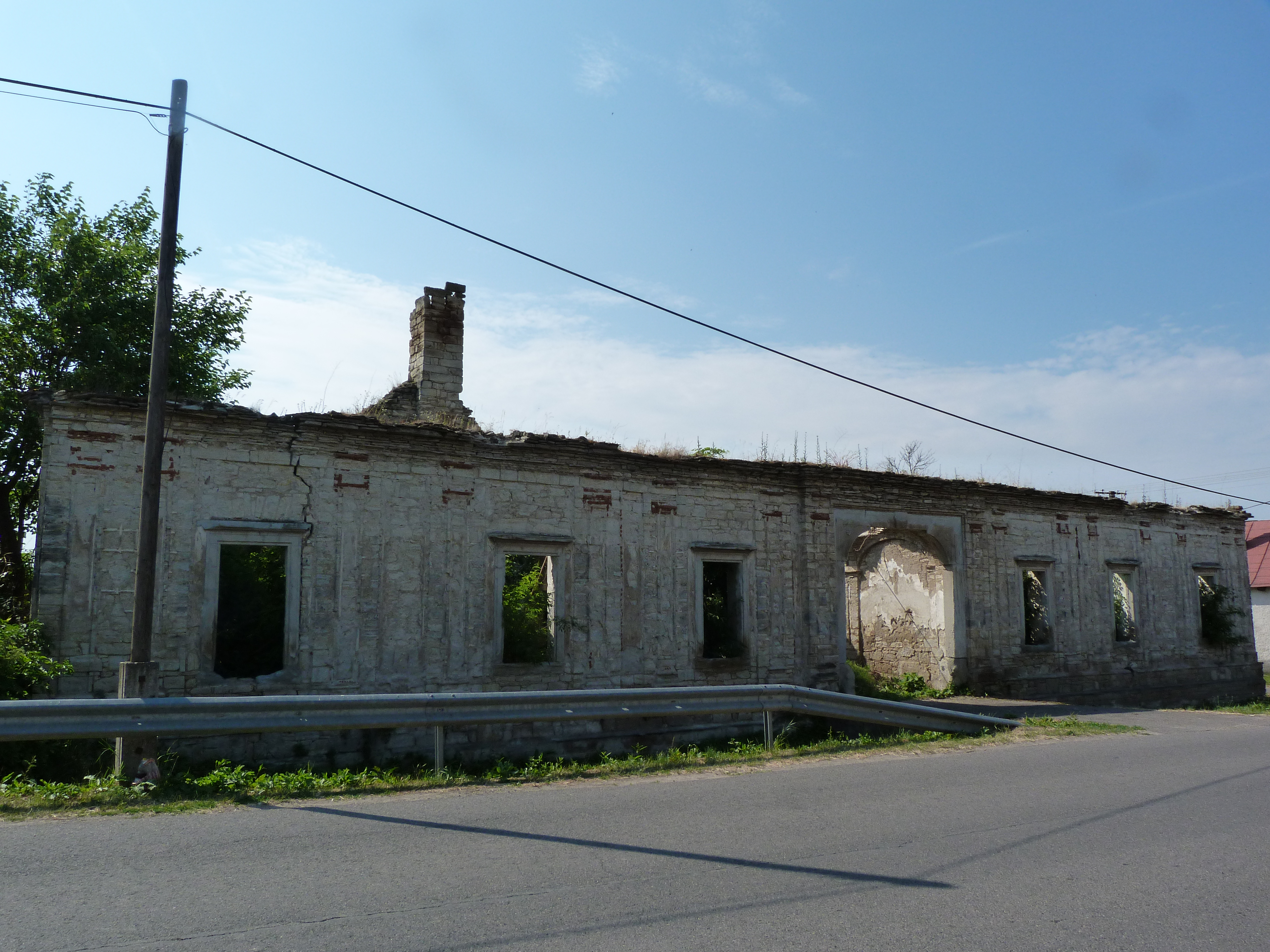
Ruins of the former Pauline Monastery

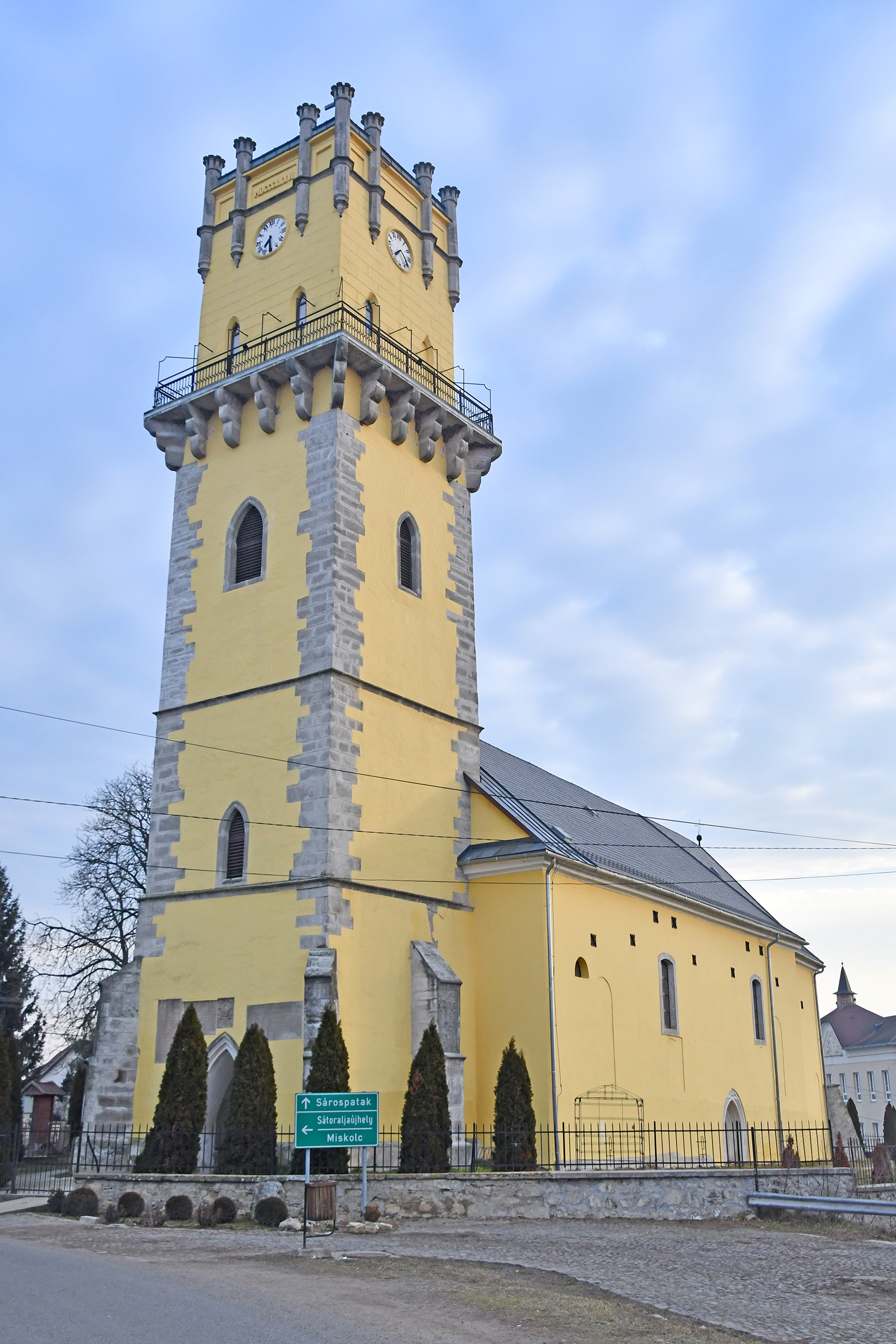
Catholic church

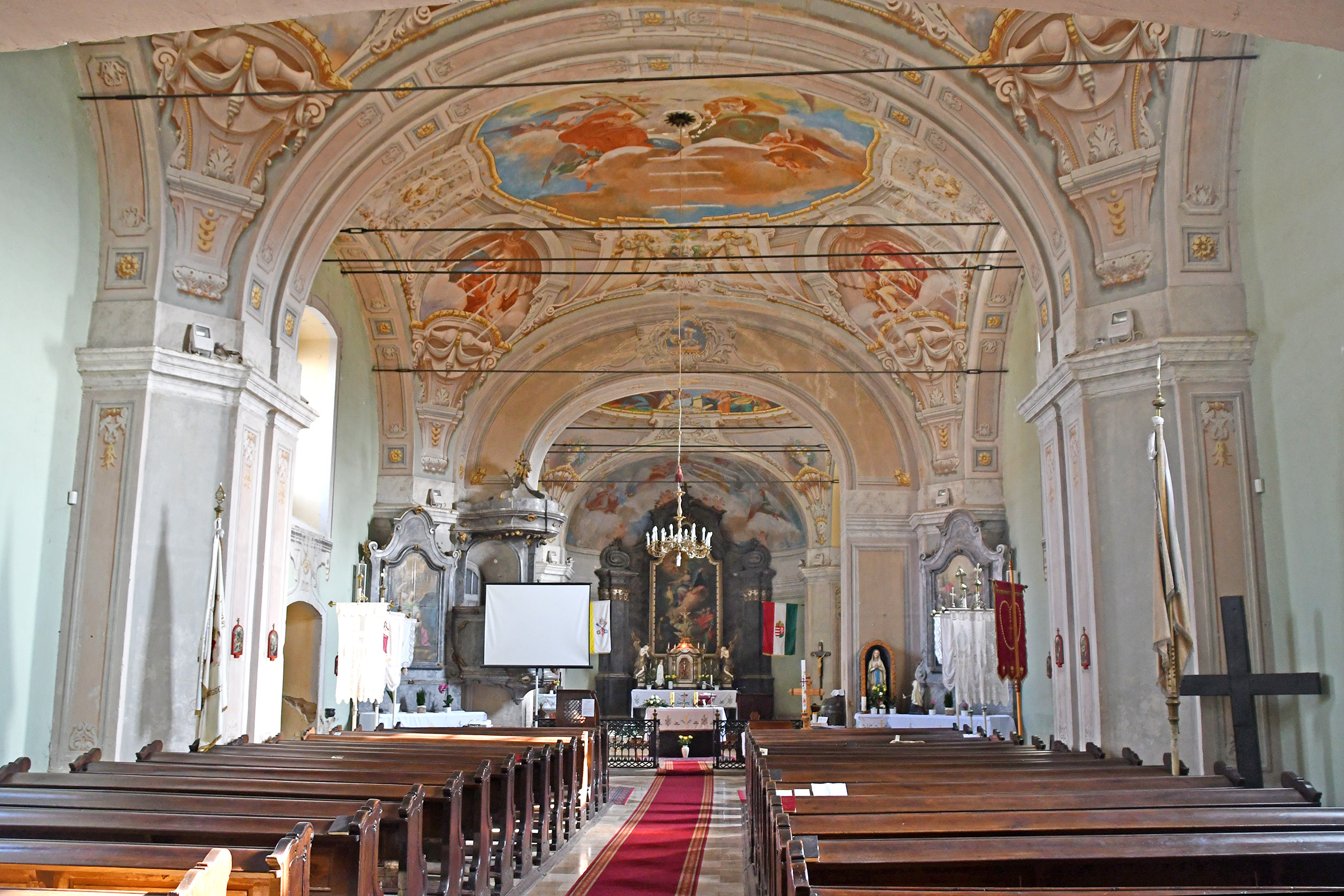
Interior of the Catholic church

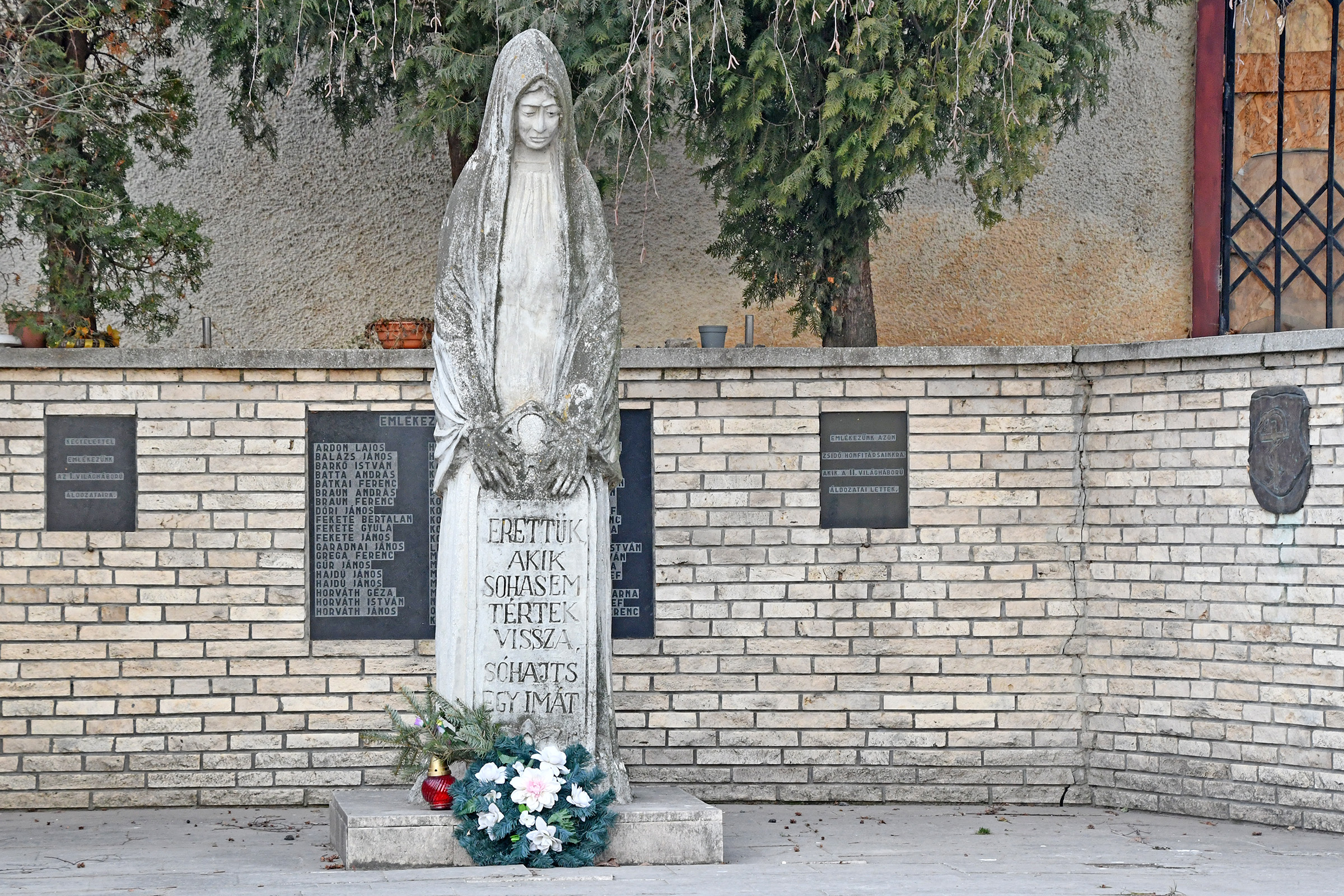
World Wars memorial

== See also ==
- Our Lady of the Assumption Church
- Liska (Hasidic dynasty)
- Tokaj wine region
