= Fony, Hungary =

Fony
- Village
- Seal

- Location within Hungary
- Coordinates: 48°23′29.19″N 21°17′0.2″E
- Country: Hungary
- Regions: Northern Hungary
- County: Borsod-Abaúj-Zemplén County

Area
  - Total: 40.55 km^{2} (15.66 sq mi)

Population (2008)
  - Total: 374
- Time zone: UTC+1 (CET)
  - Summer (DST): UTC+2 (CEST)

Fony is a village in Borsod-Abaúj-Zemplén County in northeastern Hungary. As of 2008, the village had a population of 374.

Until the holocaust of the Hungarian Jews, a Jewish community lived in Fony and there was a synagogue there.

== Geography ==
Fony is situated on the west side of the Zemplén Mountains. It has road connections with Vilmány, Korlát, Regéc and Mogyoróska.

== Sights ==
- Church of St. John of Nepomuk
- Reformed Church
