= Church of St. John of Nepomuk, Fony =

Church of St. John of Nepomuk
- Nepomuki Szent János-templom (Hungarian)

- Location within Hungary
- Location: Fony
- Country: Hungary
- Denomination: Catholic Church
- Sui iuris church: Latin Church

Administration
- Diocese: Archdiocese of Eger

The Church of St. John of Nepomuk (Hungarian: Nepomuki Szent János-templom) is a Baroque Catholic church in the village of Fony, in northern Hungary.

== History ==
The church's foundation charter is dated 1334, although the first recorded mention of the a church in Fony dates back to 1331. By the 17th century the original church had fallen into severe disrepair. The new church was built in 1788 and consecrated in honor of St. John of Nepomuk in Baroque style.

At one time, three bells rang from the church tower; today, only two remain. One was taken away during World War II and was never replaced.

== Gallery ==
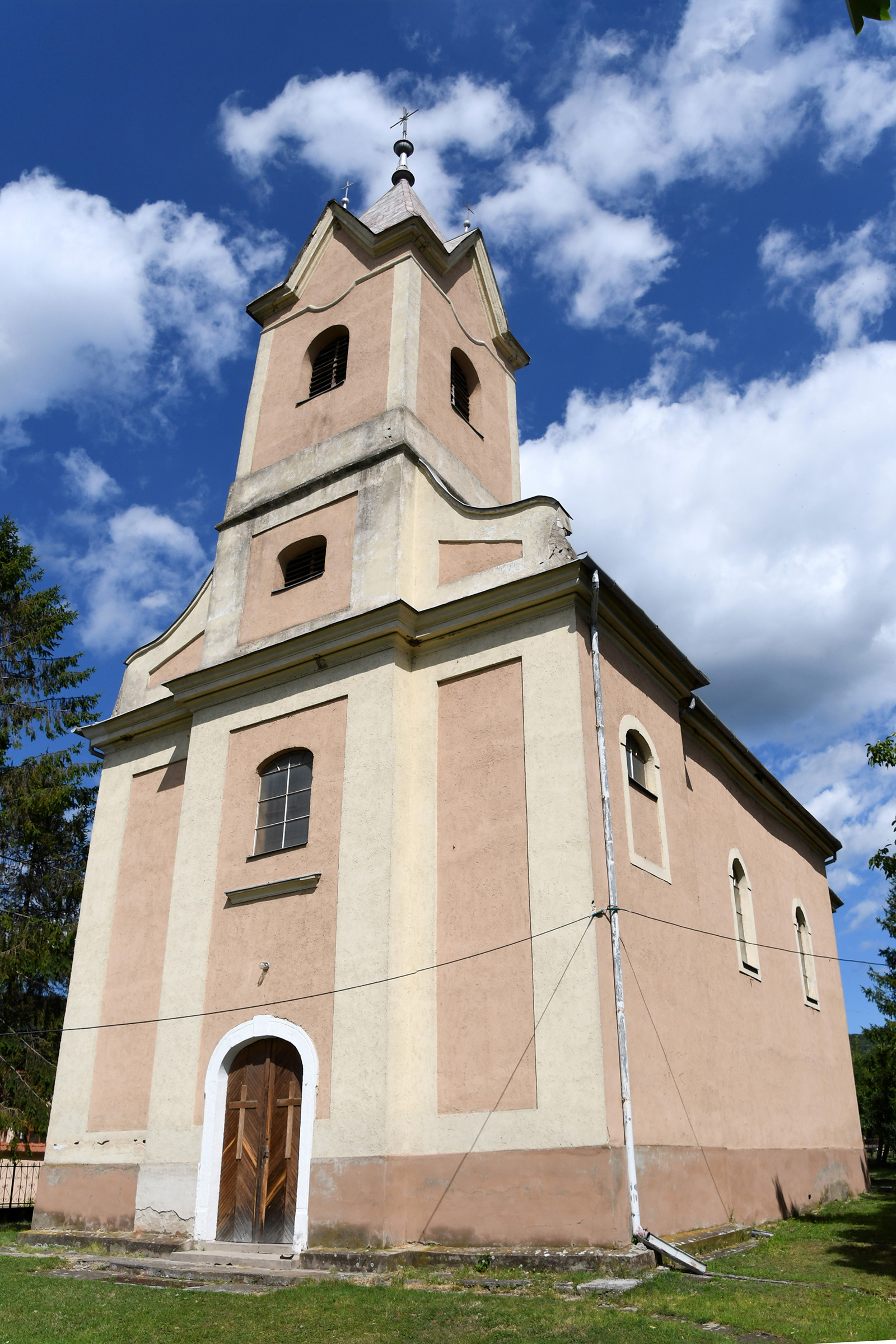
Western facade

Interior

Pulpit

Altar

== See also ==
- Roman Catholicism in Hungary
- Fony
