= Our Lady of the Assumption Church, Olaszliszka =

Our Lady of the Assumption Church
- Nagyboldogasszony-templom (Hungarian)
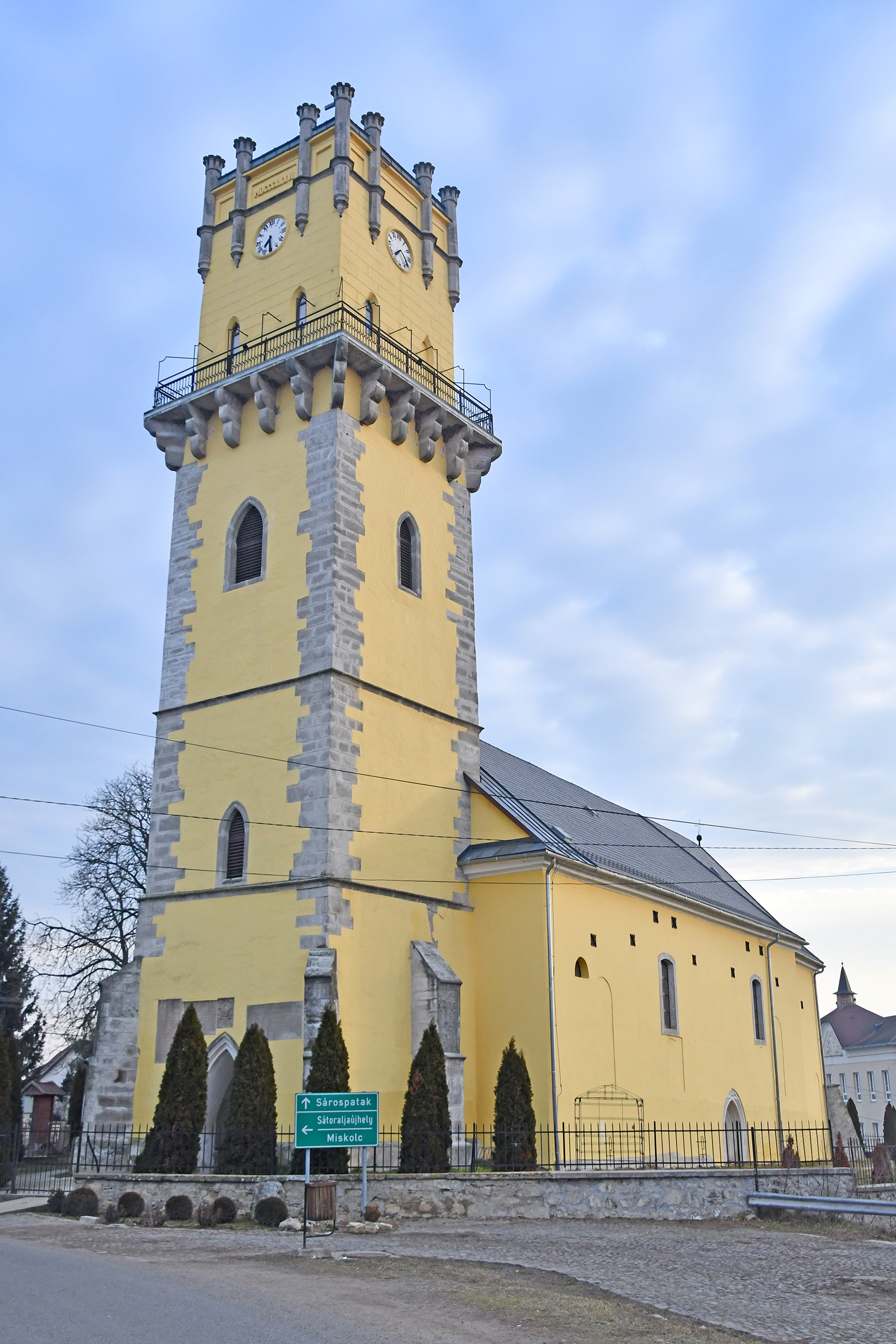

- Location within Hungary
- Location: Olaszliszka
- Country: Hungary
- Denomination: Catholic Church
- Sui iuris church: Latin Church

History
- Status: Parish church

Architecture
- Functional status: Active
- Style: Gothic
- Years built: 1320

Administration
- Archdiocese: Archdiocese of Eger

Our Lady of the Assumption Church (Hungarian: Nagyboldogasszony-templom) is a 14th-century Roman Catholic parish church in Olaszliszka, Hungary.

== History ==
The church was built in 1320. Its oldest part is the tower, which was originally built as a military watchtower. The nave of the church is in Baroque style; it was remodeled in 1634 by Dániel Stenczel, a master craftsman from Eperjes (now Prešov).

Above the balcony, the tower originally had a spire; however, in the 1830s, a raging hurricane knocked the spire into the nearby Bodrog. In place of the spire, a truncated tower was built in an eclectic style, topped by protruding columns on all four sides, giving the entire tower the appearance of a castle-like structure.

The interior of the church was painted in 1937. The first dome depicts Hungarian saints and Saint Stephen, offering his crown and his kingdom to Mary. The second dome depicts the Holy Trinity and the Four Evangelists. The third depicts the Assumption of Mary.

== Gallery ==
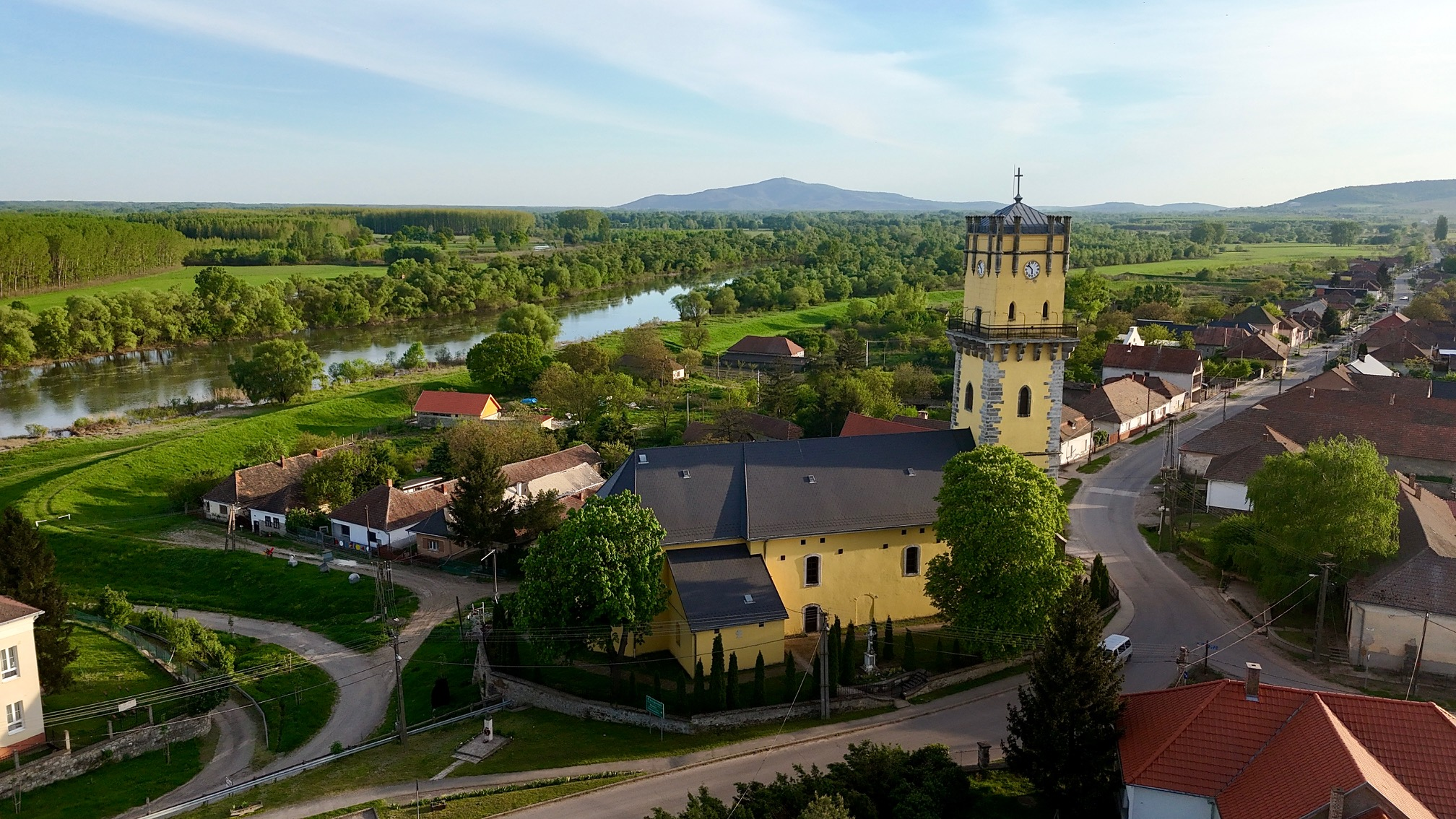
Aerial view

Back of the church

Gothic entrance

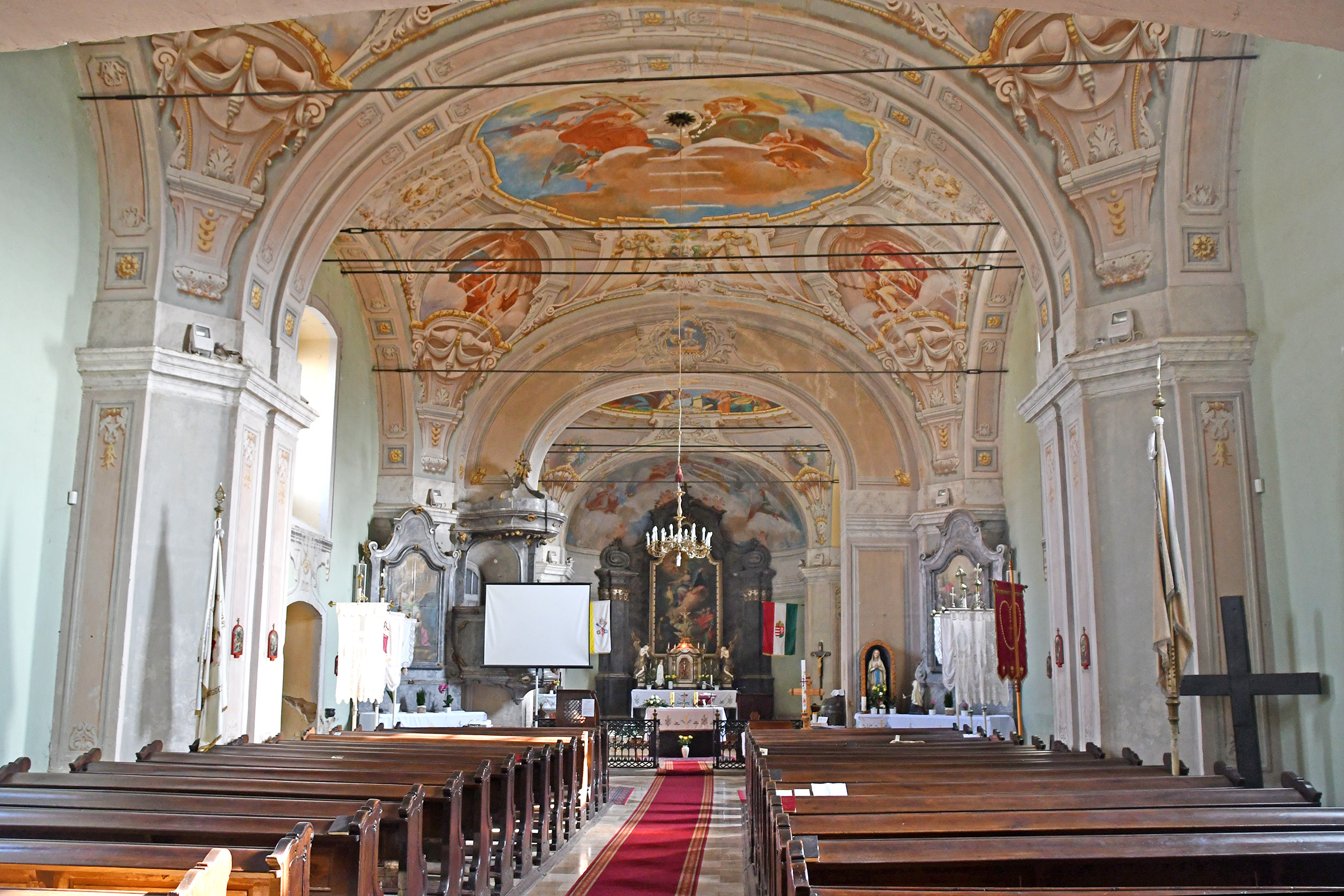
Interior

Sanctuary

Organ

== See also ==
- Roman Catholicism in Hungary
- Olaszliszka
