= Holy Trinity Church, Bodrogolaszi =

Holy Trinity Church
- Szentháromság-templom (Hungarian)

- Location within Hungary
- 48.171297111°N 21.312282704°E
- Location: Bodrogolaszi
- Country: Hungary
- Denomination: Catholic Church
- Sui iuris church: Latin Church

History
- Status: Filial church

Architecture
- Functional status: Active

Administration
- Archdiocese: Archdiocese of Eger

Holy Trinity Church (Hungarian: Szentháromság-templom) is a 12th-century Roman Catholic church in Bodrogolaszi, Hungary.

== History ==
The village was first mentioned by its current name in a charter from 1244, when King Béla IV, following the Mongol Invasion, brought Italian and Walloon settlers to revitalize the local wine industry. The church was likely built by them. It was first mentioned in 1201, in a charter issued by King Imre.

From the 17th century, the church belonged to the Pauline Order. In 1739, it was remodeled in Baroque style. At that time, the building was also furnished with new furnishings; however, the only evidence of this is the record made on the occasion of Joseph II’s dissolution of the Pauline Order in 1786.

The most significant renovation took place in 1878, most likely because flooding of the Bodrog had eroded the southern junction of the sanctuary and nave walls, requiring significant sections of the walls to be completely rebuilt.

== Gallery ==
View of the church

Tower

Back of the church

Interior

Gallery

Sanctuary

== See also ==
- Roman Catholicism in Hungary
- Bodrogolaszi
