= Bodrogolaszi =

- Village
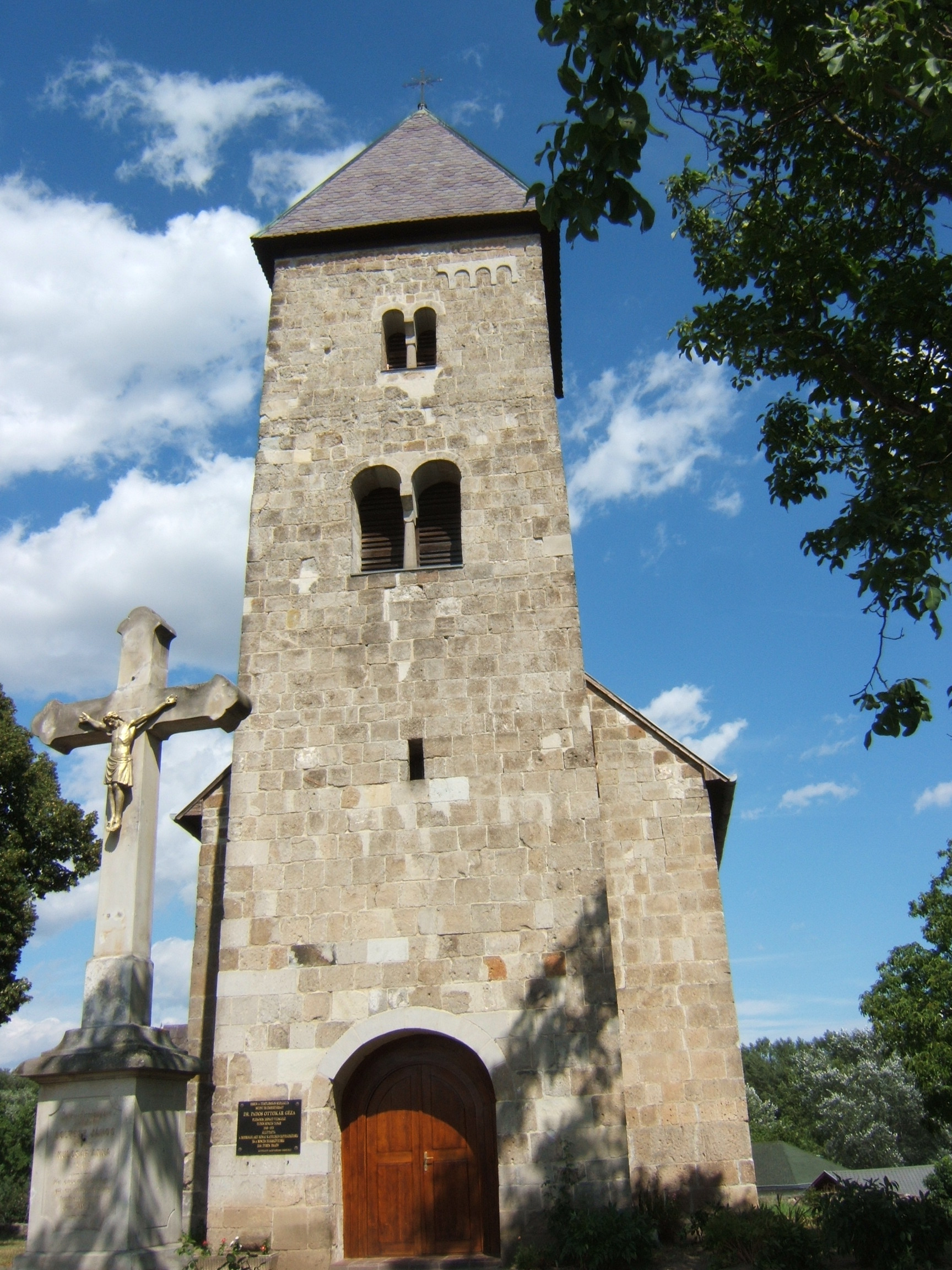
- Holy Trinity Church, Bodrogolaszi

- Flag Coat of arms

- Location of Bodrogolaszi
- Coordinates: 48.28546°N 21.51528°E
- Country: Hungary
- Region: Northern Hungary
- County: Borsod-Abaúj-Zemplén
- District: Sárospatak

Area
  - Total: 20.62 km^{2} (7.96 sq mi)

Population (1 January 2026)
  - Total: 824
  - Density: 40.0/km^{2} (103/sq mi)
- Time zone: UTC+1 (CET)
  - Summer (DST): UTC+2 (CEST)
- Postal code: 3943
- Area code: (+36) 47
- Website: www.bodrogolaszi.hu

Bodrogolaszi is a village in Borsod-Abaúj-Zemplén county, Hungary. Bodrogolaszi name comes from river Bodrog and after Italian people which are on Hungarian languages is olasz.

Jews lived in Bodrogolaszi for many years until they were murdered in the Holocaust
