= Kenézlő =

- Village
- Flag Coat of arms

- Location of Kenézlő
- Coordinates: 48.198161°N 21.529481°E
- Country: Hungary
- Region: Northern Hungary
- County: Borsod-Abaúj-Zemplén
- District: Sárospatak

Area
  - Total: 22.94 km^{2} (8.86 sq mi)

Population (1 January 2026)
  - Total: 897
  - Density: 39.1/km^{2} (101/sq mi)
- Time zone: UTC+1 (CET)
  - Summer (DST): UTC+2 (CEST)
- Postal code: 3955
- Area code: (+36) 47
- Website: kenezlo.hu

Kenézlő is a village in Borsod-Abaúj-Zemplén County in northeastern Hungary.
