= Regéc =

- Village
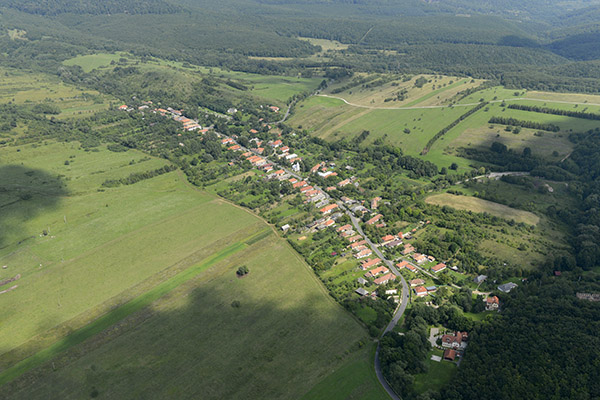

- Flag Coat of arms

- Location within Hungary
- Coordinates: 48°24′N 21°21′E
- Country: Hungary
- Regions: Northern Hungary
- County: Borsod-Abaúj-Zemplén County

Population by ethnicity (2022)
  - Hungarian: 90.5%
  - Polish: 1.6%
  - Unreported: 9.5%

Population by religion (2022)
  - Greek Catholic: 28,6%
  - Roman Catholic: 27.0%
  - Reformed: 12.7%
  - Non-religious: 9.5%
  - Unreported: 22.2%
- Time zone: UTC+1 (CET)
  - Summer (DST): UTC+2 (CEST)
- Website: regec.hu

Regéc is a village in Borsod-Abaúj-Zemplén County in northeastern Hungary.

== Geography ==
The village is located in the central part of the Zemplén Mountains, about 64 kilometres (40 mi) northeast of Miskolc.

The neighbouring settlements are: Telkibánya to the north, Nagyhuta to the north-east, Háromhuta to the east, Mogyoróska to the south, and Fony to the west. The nearest town is Gönc, 19 kilometres away. It can only be reached by road, from Fony or Háromhuta. Over the village the Castle of Regéc is located on a 693 meters high peak.

== History ==
The village's castle was built in the 13th century by the Aba clan; the earliest record of it dates from 1307. At one time, it was also owned by the Rákóczi family; Francis Rákóczi II lived here until he was five years old. Following the defeat of the War of Independence, the Austrians demolished it along with several other castles. The settlement was also destroyed at that time.

In 1750, the area was resettled, along with several neighbouring settlements, with German settlers.

=== Castle of Regéc ===
The Castle of Regéc is a castle built around 1300 in the central part of the Zemplén Mountains. By order of Emperor Leopold I, General Caprara had it demolished in 1686, after which only its ruins remained for centuries. Restoration work began in the late 1990s, and the castle can now be seen in a partially restored form.

== Gallery ==
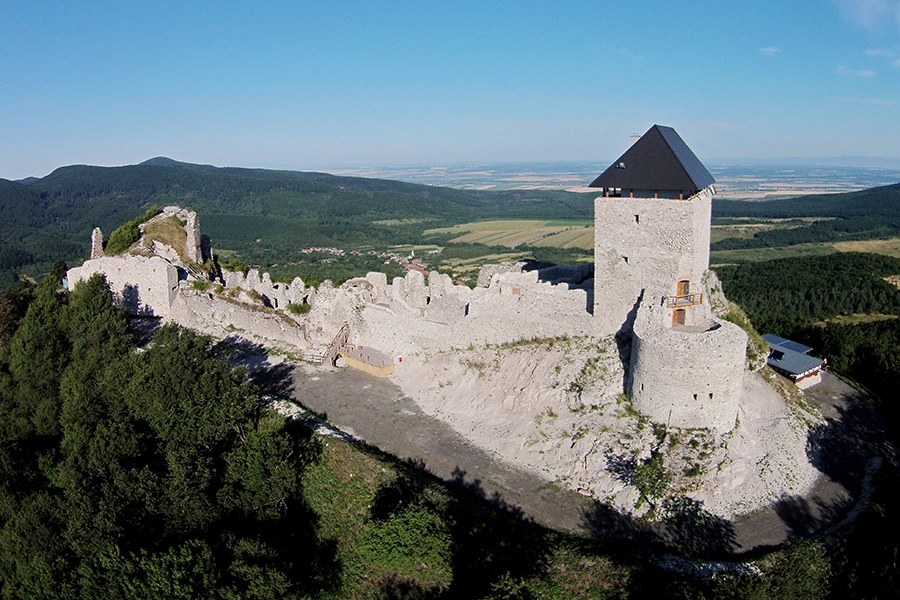

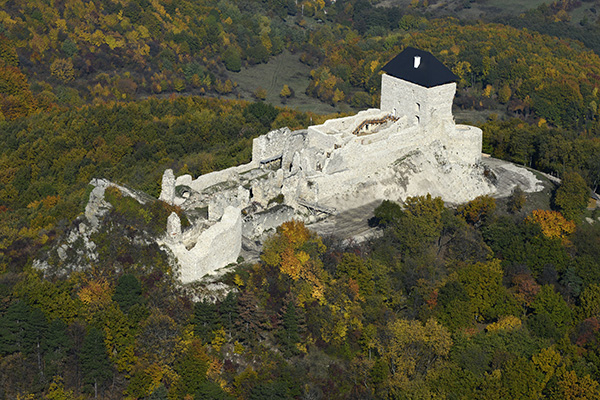

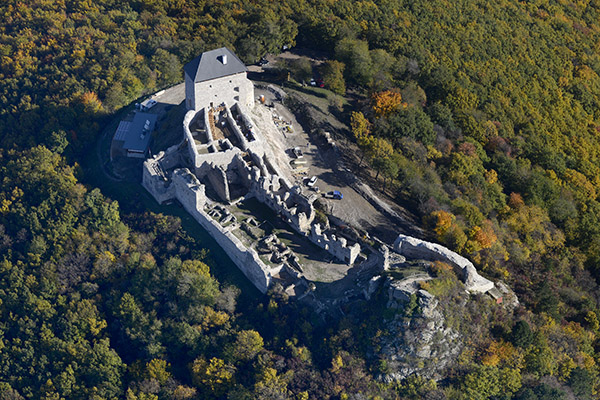
