= Makkoshotyka =

- Village
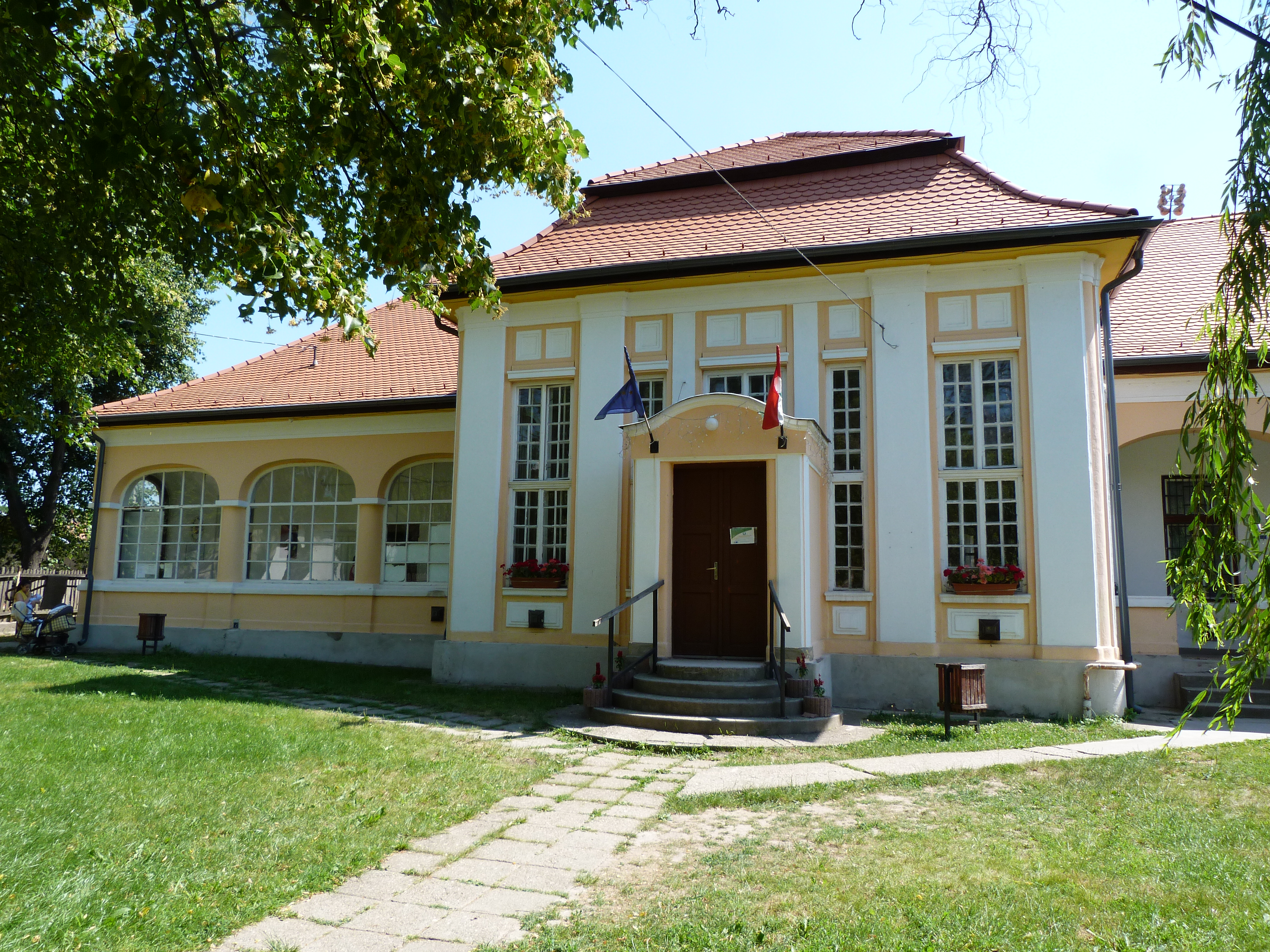

- Flag Coat of arms

- Location of Makkoshotyka
- Coordinates: 48.35808°N 21.51758°E
- Country: Hungary
- Region: Northern Hungary
- County: Borsod-Abaúj-Zemplén
- District: Sárospatak

Area
  - Total: 10.41 km^{2} (4.02 sq mi)

Population (1 January 2026)
  - Total: 719
  - Density: 69.1/km^{2} (179/sq mi)
- Time zone: UTC+1 (CET)
  - Summer (DST): UTC+2 (CEST)
- Postal code: 3959
- Area code: (+36) 47
- Website: www.makkoshotyka.hu

Makkoshotyka is a village in Borsod-Abaúj-Zemplén County, Hungary.
