= Mogyoróska =

Coordinates: 48.3787°N 21.3321°E

- Village
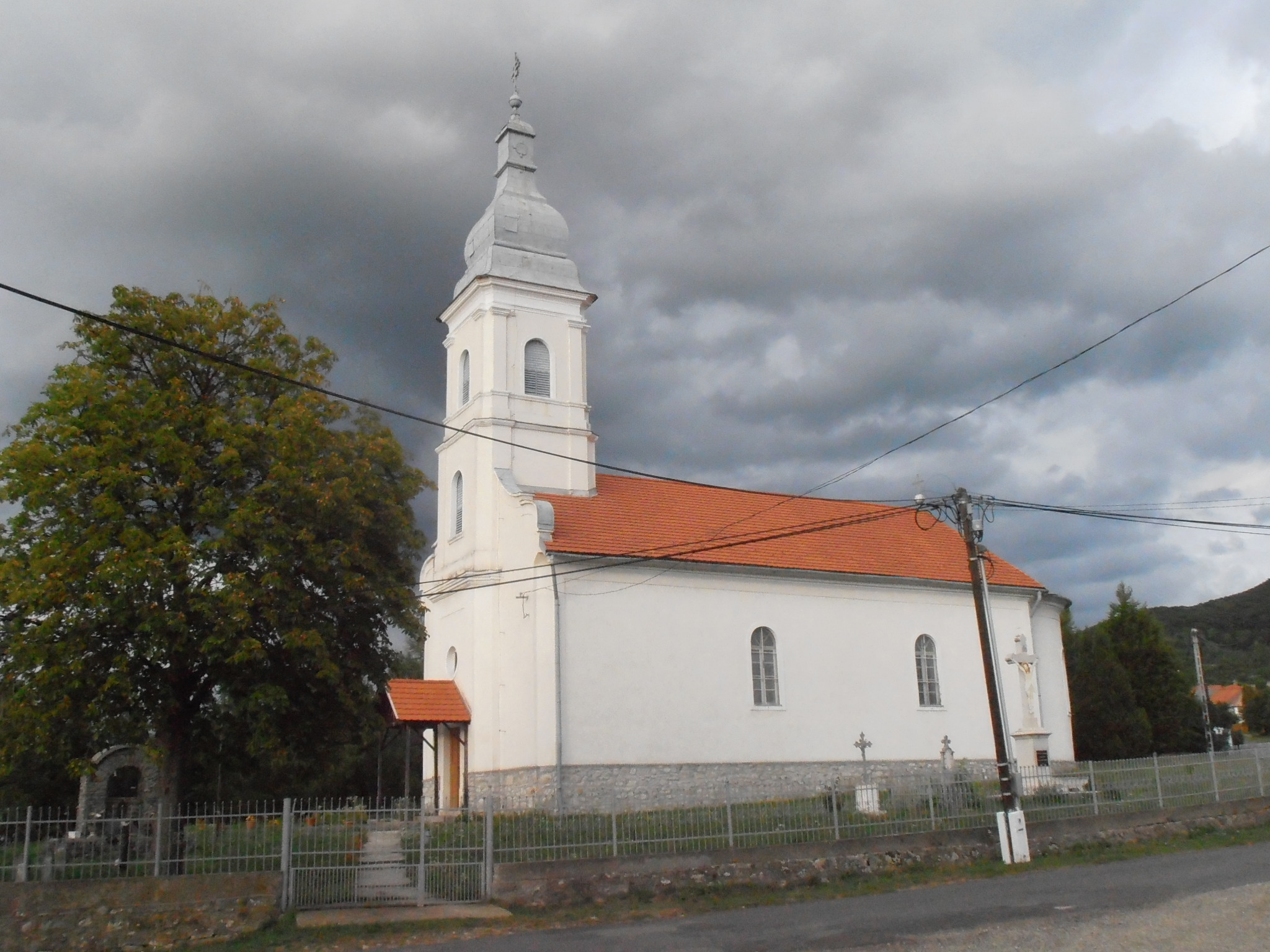
- Greek Catholic Church
- Interactive map of Mogyoróska
- Country: Hungary
- Regions: Northern Hungary
- County: Borsod-Abaúj-Zemplén County

Population (2025)
  - Total: 77

Population by ethnicity (2022)
  - Hungarian: 96,2%
  - Rusyn: 16,5
  - Slovak: 3,8%
  - German: 2,5%
  - Other: 12,7%

Population by religion (2022)
  - Greek Catholic: 44,3%
  - Roman Catholic: 22,8%
  - Reformed: 11,4%
  - Other Christian: 3,8%
  - Other Catholic: 1,3%
  - Non religious: 1,3%
  - Unreported: 15,2%
- Time zone: UTC+1 (CET)
  - Summer (DST): UTC+2 (CEST)

Mogyoróska is a village in Borsod-Abaúj-Zemplén County in northeastern Hungary. Near to Regéc in the Zemplén Mountains. Because of the picturesque landscape the village is on the path of the National Blue Trail.
