= Zalkod =

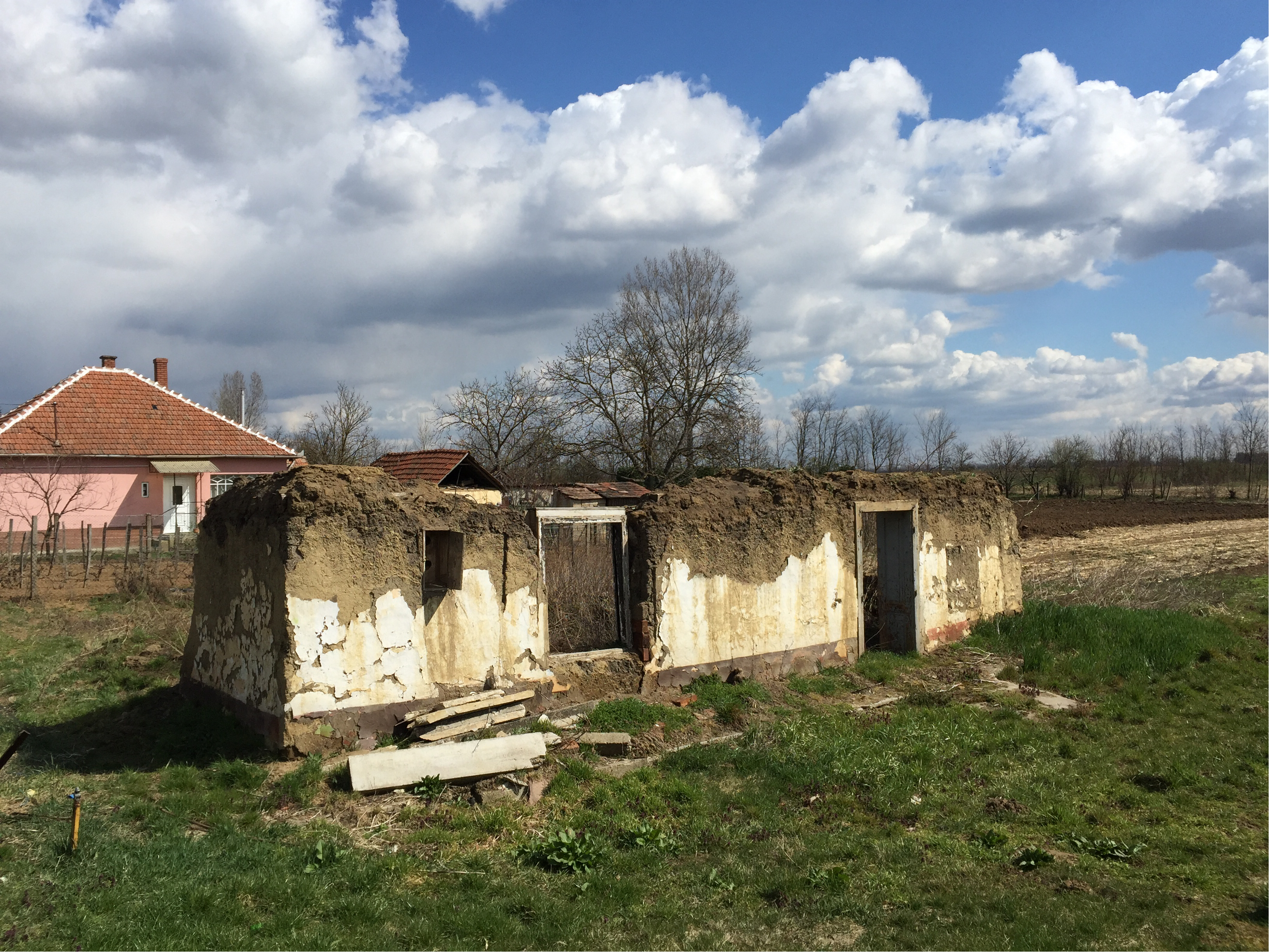

- Location of Borsod-Abaúj-Zemplén county in Hungary

- Location of Zalkod
- Coordinates: 48.18518°N 21.45929°E
- Country: Hungary
- County: Borsod-Abaúj-Zemplén

Area
  - Total: 10.22 km^{2} (3.95 sq mi)

Population (2004)
  - Total: 299
  - Density: 29.25/km^{2} (75.8/sq mi)
- Time zone: UTC+1 (CET)
  - Summer (DST): UTC+2 (CEST)
- Postal code: 3957
- Area code: 47

Zalkod is a village in Borsod–Abaúj–Zemplén county, Hungary. In the 19th century a small Jewish community lived in the village, many of whose members were murdered in the Holocaust There was a Jewish cemetery in the village
