= Viss, Hungary =

Viss
- Location of Borsod-Abaúj-Zemplén county in Hungary

- Location of Viss, Hungary
- Coordinates: 48.21790°N 21.50463°E
- Country: Hungary
- County: Borsod-Abaúj-Zemplén

Area
  - Total: 13.9 km^{2} (5.4 sq mi)

Population (2004)
  - Total: 750
  - Density: 53.95/km^{2} (139.7/sq mi)
- Time zone: UTC+1 (CET)
  - Summer (DST): UTC+2 (CEST)
- Postal code: 3956
- Area code: 47

Viss is a village in Borsod-Abaúj-Zemplén county, Hungary.
