= Hungarian Catholic Bishops' Conference =

Assembly of Catholic bishops

Logo of the bishops' conference

Hungarian Catholic Bishops' Conference (HCBC) (in Hungarian: Magyar Katolikus Püspöki Konferencia) is the Episcopal Conference of Catholic bishops of Hungary.

== The Bishops' Conference ==
After the Second Vatican Council the Hungarian Catholic Bishops' Conference was created. Its first chairman was Archbishop of Kalocsa-Kecskemét Endre Hamvash. On May 5, 2001, the Holy See approved the Charter of the Conference of the Catholic Bishops of Hungary. Currently, it is headed by Bishop András Veres.

The Hungarian Conference of Catholic Bishops is a full member of the Council of Conferences of Catholic Bishops of Europe and the Council of Conferences of Catholic Bishops of the European Union.

It consists of 21 integrants: 15 bishops, heads of 15 archdioceses and dioceses of Hungary (including three bishops of the Hungarian Greek Catholic Church), 4 auxiliary bishops, the abbot of the territorial abbey of Pannonhalma and the head of the military ordinate of Hungary

== List of presidents ==
- Archbishop Endre Hamvas (1966–1969) Archbishop of Kalocsa
- Archbishop József Ijjas (1969-1976) Archbishop of Kalocsa
- Cardinal László Lékai (1976-1986) Archbishop of Esztergom
- Cardinal László Paskai (1986–1990) Archbishop of Esztergom-Budapest
- Archbishop István Seregély (1990–2005), Archbishop of Eger
- Cardinal Péter Erdő (2005–2015), Archbishop of Esztergom-Budapest
- Bishop András Veres (2015-), Bishop of Győr

== Officials ==
- President: Dr. András Veres, Bishop of Győr
- Vice President: Dr. György Udvardy, Archbishop of Veszprém
- Secretary, Spokesperson: Dr. Tamás Tóth
- Bureau Director: Dr. Gábor Németh

The secretariat address: 45 Városligeti fasor, Budapest, H-1071 HUNGARY

== Members ==
=== Diocesan bishops ===
- Dr. Péter Erdő, Cardinal, Primate of Hungary, Archbishop of Esztergom-Budapest (2002 - ; 1999 - 2002 Auxiliary Bishop of Székesfehérvár, 2003 - Cardinal)
- Dr. Balázs Bábel, Archbishop of Kalocsa-Kecskemét (1999 - ; 1999 Coadjutor Archbishop of Kalocsa-Kecskemét)
- Dr. Csaba Ternyák, Archbishop of Eger (2007 - ; 1992 - 2007 Auxiliary Bishop of Esztergom)
- Dr. György Udvardy, Archbishop of Veszprém (2011 - 2019 Bishop of Pécs; 2004 - 2011 Auxiliary Bishop of Esztergom-Budapest)
- Péter Fülöp Kocsis, Archbishop of Hajdúdorog (2015 - ; Bishop of Hajdúdorog 2008 - 2015)
- Dr. András Veres, Bishop of Győr (2016 - ; 2006 - 2016 Bishop of Szombathely, 1999 - 2006 Auxiliary Bishop of Eger, 19 January 2011 - 9 April 2011 Apostolic Administrator of the Diocese of Pécs)
- Dr. Lászlo Kiss-Rigó, Bishop of Szeged-Csanád (2006 - ; 2004 - 2006 Auxiliary Bishop of Esztergom-Budapest)
- Tamás Cirill Hortobágyi O.S.B., Archabbot of Pannonhalma territorial abbey (2018 - )
- László Varga, Bishop of Kaposvár (2017 - )
- Antal Spányi, Bishop of Székesfehérvár (2003 - ; 1998 - 2003 Auxiliary Bishop of Esztergom-Budapest)
- Dr. Atanáz Orosz, Bishop of Miskolc (2015 - ; 2011 – 2015 Apostolic Exarch of Miskolc)
- Ferenc Palánki, Bishop of Debrecen-Nyíregyháza (2015 - ; 2010 - 2015 Auxiliary Bishop of Eger)
- Dr. János Székely, Bishop of Szombathely (2017 - ; 2007 - 2017 Auxiliary Bishop of Esztergom-Budapest)
- Fr. Ábel Szocska O.S.B.M., Bishop of Nyíregyháza (2015 - )
- Zsolt Marton, Bishop of Vác (2019 - )
- László Felföldi, Bishop of Pécs (2021 - )
- Tibor Berta, Military Ordinary (2021 - )

=== Auxiliary bishops ===
- Dr. Ferenc Cserháti, Titular Bishop of Centuria, Auxiliary Bishop of Esztergom-Budapest (in charge of the pastoral care of Hungarians living abroad, lives in Munich.) (2007 - )
- Dr. Lajos Varga, Titular Bishop of Sicca Veneria, Auxiliary Bishop of Vác, vicar general (2006 - )
- Dr. Gábor Mohos, Titular Bishop of Iliturgi, Auxiliary Bishop of Esztergom-Budapest (2018 - )
- Szabolcs Benedek Fekete, Titular Bishop of Basti, Auxiliary Bishop of Szombathely (2022 - )

=== Retired Bishops (who are not members of the conference) ===
- Endre Gyulay, Bishop Emeritus of Szeged-Csanád (1987 - 2006)
- Dr. Szilárd Keresztes, Bishop Emeritus of Hajdúdorog (1975 - 1988 Auxiliary Bishop of Hajdúdorog, 1988 - 2007 Bishop of Hajdúdorog, 1988 - 2008 Apostolic Governor of Miskolc)
- Dr. Gáspár Ladocsi, Titular Bishop of Risinium, Auxiliary Bishop Emeritus of Esztergom-Budapest (1994 - 2001 Military Ordinary, Bishop, 2001 - 2010 Auxiliary Bishop of Esztergom-Budapest)
- Mihály Mayer, Bishop Emeritus of Pécs (1988 - 1989 Auxiliary Bishop of Pécs, 1989 - 2011 Bishop of Pécs)
- Dr. István Katona, Titular Bishop of Brixellum, Auxiliary Bishop Emeritus of Eger, vicar general, high-provost (1997 - 2013; 1989 - 1997 Auxiliary Bishop of Vác)
- Nándor Bosák, Bishop Emeritus of Debrecen-Nyíregyháza (1993 - 2015)
- Dr. Lajos Pápai, Bishop Emeritus of Győr (1991 - 2016)
- Béla Balás, Bishop Emeritus of Kaposvár (1993 - 2017; 1992 - 1993 Auxiliary Bishop of Veszprém)
- Dr. Asztrik Várszegi O.S.B., Archabbot Emeritus of Pannonhalma territorial abbey, Titular Bishop of Culus (1991 - 2018; 1988 - 1991 Auxiliary Bishop of Esztergom)
- Dr. Gyula Márfi Archbishop Emeritus of Veszprém (1997 - 2019; 1995 - 1997 Auxiliary Bishop of Eger)
- Dr. Miklós Beer, Bishop Emeritus of Vác (2003 - 2019; 2000 - 2003 Auxiliary Bishop of Esztergom-Budapest)
- László Bíró, Military Ordinary Emeritus (2008 - 2021; 1994 - 2008 Auxiliary Bishop of Kalocsa-Kecskemét)

== The Hungarian Catholic Bishops' Conference of the Permanent Council members ==
- Dr. Andras Veres, Bishop of Győr, President of the HCBC
- Dr. György Udvardy Archbishop of Veszprém, Vice President
- Dr. Péter Erdő, Cardinal, Primate of Hungary, Archbishop of Esztergom-Budapest, President emeritus of the HCBC, President emeritus of the CCEE
- Dr. János Székely, Bishop of Szombathely

== See also ==
- Catholic Church in Hungary
