= List of cathedrals in Hungary =

This is the list of cathedrals in Hungary sorted by denomination.

== Latin Catholic ==
Cathedrals of the Latin Catholic Church in Hungary:

Diocese	Cathedral	Location	Image
Diocese of Debrecen–Nyíregyháza	St. Anne's Cathedral	Debrecen	
Diocese of Debrecen–Nyíregyháza	Co-Cathedral of Our Lady of the Hungarians	Nyíregyháza	
Archdiocese of Eger	Metropolitan Cathedral Basilica of St. John the Apostle and Evangelist, St. Michael and the Immaculate Conception	Eger	
Archdiocese of Esztergom–Budapest	Primatial Basilica of the Assumption of the Blessed Virgin Mary and St Adalbert	Esztergom	
Archdiocese of Esztergom–Budapest	St. Stephen's Basilica	Budapest	
Diocese of Győr	Cathedral Basilica of the Assumption of Our Lady	Győr	
Archdiocese of Kalocsa–Kecskemét	Assumption Cathedral	Kalocsa	
Archdiocese of Kalocsa–Kecskemét	Co-Cathedral of the Ascension of the Lord	Kecskemét	
Diocese of Kaposvár	Our Lady of the Assumption Cathedral	Kaposvár	
Diocese of Kaposvár	St. Martin's Basilica – Territorial Abbey of Saint Martin on Mount Pannonhalma	Pannonhalma	
Diocese of Pécs	Sts. Peter and Paul's Cathedral Basilica	Pécs	
Diocese of Szeged–Csanád	Votive Church and Cathedral of Our Lady of Hungary	Szeged	
Diocese of Szeged–Csanád	Co-Cathedral of St. Anthony of Padua	Békéscsaba	
Diocese of Székesfehérvár	Cathedral Basilica of St. Stephen the King	Székesfehérvár	
Diocese of Szombathely	Our Lady of the Visitation Cathedral	Szombathely	
Diocese of Vác	Cathedral of the Assumption of the Blessed Virgin and St Michael the Archangel	Vác	
Archdiocese of Veszprém	St. Michael's Cathedral Basilica	Veszprém	

== Greek Catholic ==
Cathedrals of the Greek Catholic Church in Hungary:

Diocese	Cathedral	Location	Image
Archdiocese of Hajdúdorog	Cathedral of the Presentation of Mary	Hajdúdorog	
Diocese of Miskolc	Assumption Cathedral	Miskolc	
Diocese of Nyíregyháza	St. Nicholas Cathedral	Nyíregyháza	

== Eastern Orthodox ==
Eastern Orthodox cathedrals in Hungary:

Church	Diocese	Cathedral	Location	Image
Serbian Orthodox Church	Eparchy of Buda	Cathedral of the Dormition of the Theotokos	Szentendre	
Romanian Orthodox Church	Romanian Orthodox Diocese of Hungary	St. Nicholas Cathedral	Gyula	
Russian Orthodox Church	Diocese of Budapest and Hungary	Cathedral of the Dormition of the Mother of God	Budapest	

== Oriental Orthodox ==
Oriental Orthodox cathedrals in Hungary:

Church	Diocese	Cathedral	Location	Image
Coptic Orthodox Church	Coptic Orthodox Patriarchate of Hungary	Cathedral of the Blessed Virgin Mary and St. Michael the Archangel	Budapest	

== See also ==
- Lists of cathedrals by country
