= János Brenner =

Hungarian Catholic priest and martyr

Blessed János Brenner OCist
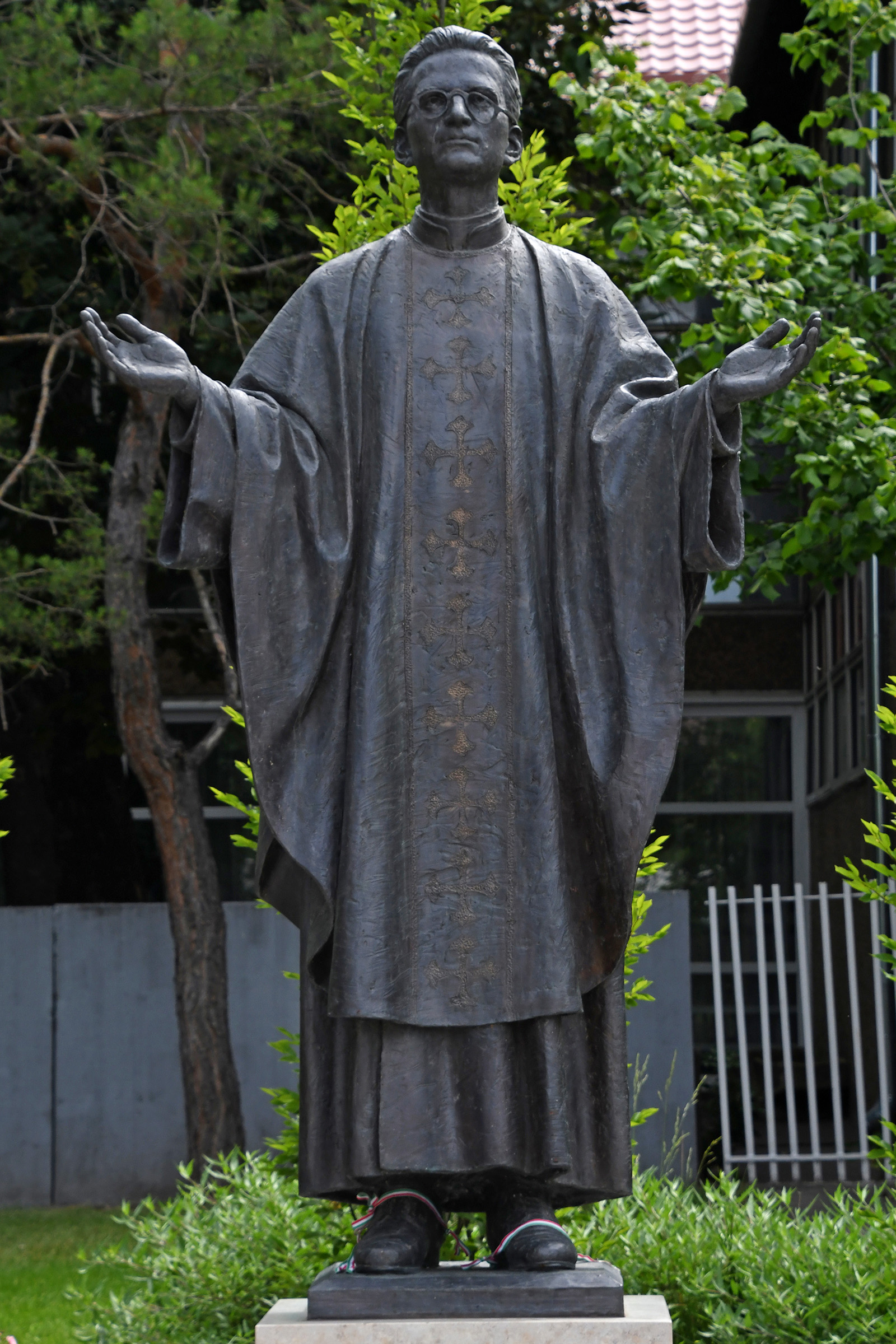

Martyr
- Born: 27 December 1931; Szombathely, Vas, Hungary
- Died: 15 December 1957 (aged 25); Zsida, Szentgotthárd, Vas, Hungary
- Venerated in: Roman Catholic Church
- Beatified: 1 May 2018, Szombathely, Hungary by Cardinal Angelo Amato
- Feast: 15 December
- Attributes: Cistercian habit

János Brenner, O.Cist (Hungarian: [ˈbrɛnɛr ˈjaːnoʃ]; religious name: Anasztáz Brenner; 27 December 1931 – 15 December 1957) was a Hungarian Catholic priest and member of the Cistercian Order. Brenner studied for the priesthood during a period of communist persecution of religious orders. Communist authorities came to suspect him of being critical of their regime; his success as a youth chaplain made him a threat. As a consequence, he was murdered by hired men who stabbed him 32 times and inflicted severe wounds to his head using canes. He died soon after having been hurled into a ditch in the woods. The beatification took place on 1 May 2018 in Szombathely.

== Life ==
János Brenner was born on 27 December 1931 in the Vas province as the second of three boys. His two brothers also became priests.

He attended a Cistercian-run grammar school in Pécs from 1941 to 1946 after the Brenners moved there. He later attended the grammar school that the Premonstratensian Canons ran and graduated from the Cistercian school in Zirc. Brenner began his novitiate in 1950 with the Cistercians at Zirc and took the religious name "Anasztáz" (Anastasius: Greek for "the resurrected"). But a few months after, he had to interrupt his monastic formation when the communist regime began to suppress all religious houses in Hungary. The novice master, Lawrence Sigmond, sought to protect the young men undergoing formation and thus moved them from the abbey, placing them with families in private apartments. The clandestine novices met for formation and fellowship. Brenner was able to attend a diocesan seminary while staying in touch with Sigmond; he studied in Budapest and in Győr. On 19 June 1955, Janos was ordained to the priesthood in the diocesan cathedral of Szombathely by Bishop Sándor Kovács.

Brenner's first assignment was to be a chaplain in St. Gotthard, a parish which had over previous centuries been in Cistercian care and site of a former monastery. After the communists made personal threats against the enthusiastic and idealistic chaplain, his bishop offered to send Brenner elsewhere, but he said, "I'm not afraid" and affirmed his desire to remain where he was.

Around midnight on 15 December, 1957 (Brenner was preparing his sermon for 16 December) he was called to give last rites to a supposedly ill man in a neighboring town; he failed to realize that it was a trap. The 17-year-old boy who summoned him had been known to Brenner as an altar server. The young priest took anointing oils and the Eucharist with him in his bag. He was soon ambushed in the woods and stabbed 32 times. He was found dead that morning, earning him the title "Hungarian Tarcisius," since that martyr had died in similar circumstances.

Brenner was interred in the family vault in the Salesian church of Saint Quirinus on 18 December. The authorities made a failed attempt to disperse the crowd at his funeral. His ordination motto, taken from Romans 8:28, was inscribed on the tomb: "All things work together for good to those who love God."

Over the years, Catholics continued to venerate Brenner and visited his grave often. In 1981 a stained glass window was dedicated to him in Saint Elizabeth's Church in his hometown. In 1989, the Chapel of the Good Pastor was built on the exact spot where the young priest had been murdered. Later, his tomb was moved to the Szombathely Cathedral.

== Beatification ==
The beatification process opened under Pope John Paul II on 14 February 2001; the diocesan investigations opened on 3 October 1999 and concluded only a decade later. The Vatican later validated the process on 18 September 2009, and a commission of historians approved the cause on 4 September 2015.

Pope Francis confirmed that Brenner died as a victim "in odium fidei" (in hatred of the faith). On 8 November 2017, the pontiff approved the priest's beatification. The solemn liturgy took place on 1 May 2018, in Szombathely's City Park.

== Legacy ==
A Catholic school in Szombathely is named after Brenner, and the school has a bronze statue of the martyr in its courtyard. Brenner is commemorated, along with Blessed Maria Sagheddu, in an altarpiece at Heiligenkreuz Abbey in Austria.

== Literature and documentaries ==
In 2023, a Hungarian language docuseries about Brenner, titled Legyetek szeretettel (English: Be with love), was released on Hír TV.
