= Ferenc Palánki =

Hungarian Roman Catholic archbishop (born 1964)

The Most Reverend Ferenc Palánki
- Archbishop of Kalocsa–Kecskemét
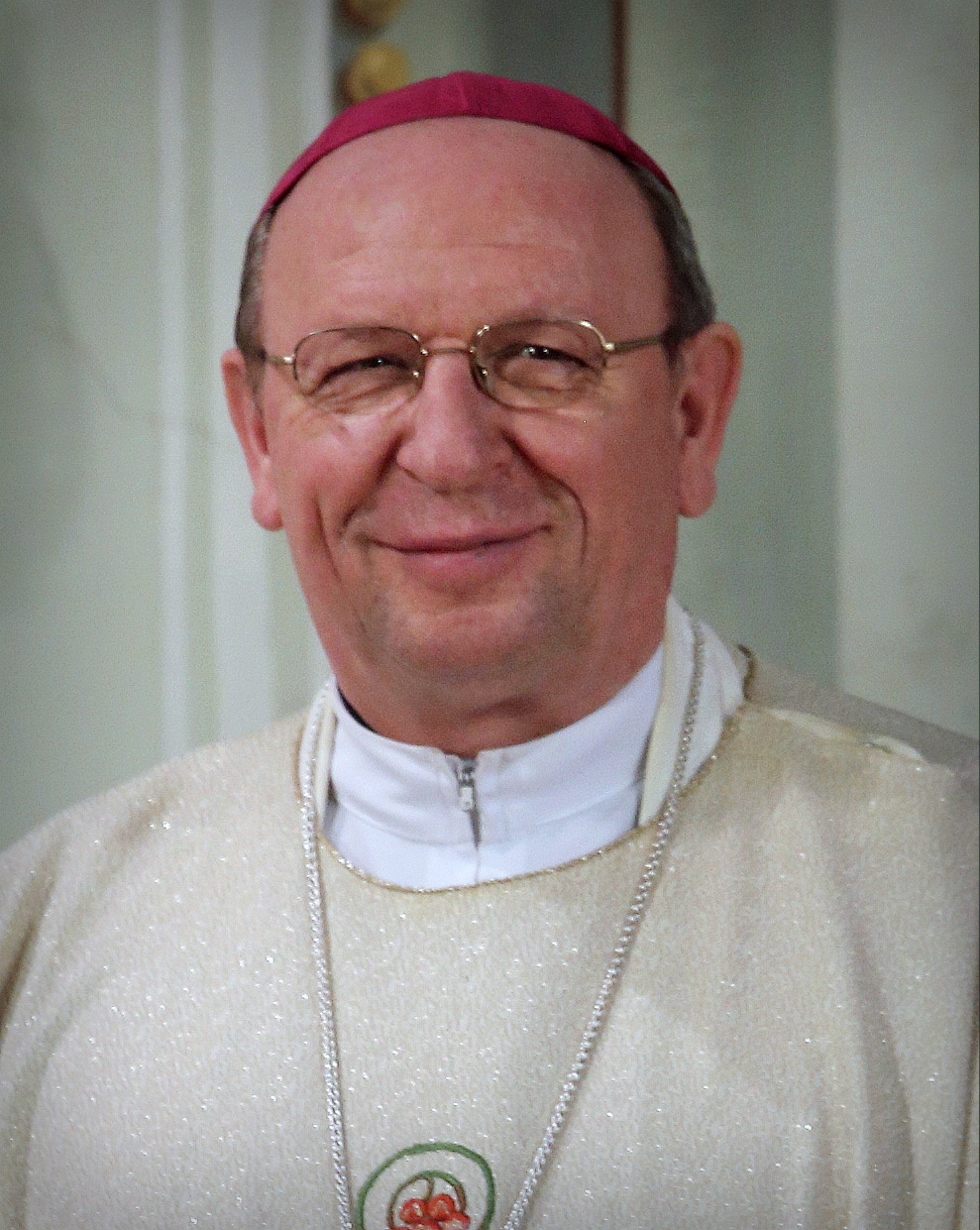
- Church: Catholic Church
- Archdiocese: Archdiocese of Kalocsa–Kecskemét
- Appointed: 3 September 2026
- Predecessor: Balázs Bábel

Orders
- Ordination: 18 June 1994 by László Paskai
- Consecration: 26 February 2011 by Péter Erdő

Personal details
- Born: 11 March 1964 (age 62) Balassagyarmat, Hungary
- Education: Pázmány Péter Catholic University
- Motto: Jesus est resurrectio et vita ("Jesus is the resurrection and the life")
- Coat of arms

Ferenc Palánki (born 11 March 1964) is a Hungarian Roman Catholic prelate who has served as Archbishop of Kalocsa–Kecskemét since 2026. He previously served as bishop of Debrecen–Nyíregyháza from 2015 to 2026 and as an auxiliary bishop of the Archdiocese of Eger from 2010 to 2015.

== Early life and education ==
Palánki was born on 11 March 1964 in Balassagyarmat, Hungary. He spent his childhood in the nearby village of Csesztve and completed his secondary education in Balassagyarmat. After graduating from secondary school, he studied at the Győr College of Transport and Telecommunications, where he obtained an engineering qualification. At the age of 25, he decided to pursue the priesthood and sought admission to the Archdiocese of Esztergom. From 1989 to 1994 he studied philosophy and theology at the Esztergom College of Theology.

He subsequently obtained a licentiate in canon law from the Postgraduate Institute of Canon Law at Pázmány Péter Catholic University in Budapest in 2000.

== Priesthood ==
Palánki was ordained a priest on 18 June 1994 in Esztergom by Cardinal László Paskai, then Archbishop of Esztergom-Budapest. Although he had originally sought admission to the Archdiocese of Esztergom–Budapest and received his priestly ordination there, he was shortly incardinated into the Diocese of Vác effective 1 August 1994.

From 1994 to 1996, he served as a chaplain in Balassagyarmat. He was parish priest of Dorogháza from 1996 to 2000 and of Püspökszilágy from 2000 to 2005. From 2005 to 2010 he was spiritual director at the preparatory seminary of Vác and also served as defender of the bond at the diocesan tribunal from 1999 to 2010. In 2010, he became spiritual director of the Central Seminary in Budapest.

== Episcopate ==
On 27 December 2010, Pope Benedict XVI appointed Palánki titular bishop of Fidoloma and auxiliary bishop of the Archdiocese of Eger. At the time of his appointment, he was serving as spiritual director of the preparatory seminary in Vác. He received his episcopal consecration in the Cathedral Basilica of Eger on 26 February 2011. The principal consecrator was Cardinal Péter Erdő, Archbishop of Esztergom-Budapest, with Juliusz Janusz, Apostolic Nuncio to Hungary, and Csaba Ternyák, Archbishop of Eger, as principal co-consecrators.

From 2011 he served as parish priest of Miskolc-Mindszent, and from 2013 he was also vicar general of the Archdiocese of Eger.

=== Bishop of Debrecen–Nyíregyháza ===
On 21 September 2015, Pope Francis appointed Palánki bishop of the Diocese of Debrecen–Nyíregyháza, transferring him from his titular see of Fidoloma and the office of auxiliary bishop of Eger. He was installed on 14 November 2015 at St. Anne's Cathedral, Debrecen.

During his episcopate he served on committees of the Hungarian Catholic Bishops' Conference, including those concerned with legal affairs, clergy and consecrated life, and doctrine.

=== Archbishop of Kalocsa–Kecskemét ===
On 3 September 2026, Pope Leo XIV accepted the resignation of Balázs Bábel as metropolitan archbishop of the Archdiocese of Kalocsa–Kecskemét and appointed Palánki as his successor. The appointment transferred him from the Diocese of Debrecen–Nyíregyháza to the metropolitan see of Kalocsa–Kecskemét. The appointment was announced by the Holy See on the same day and reported by Vatican News and the Hungarian Catholic Church.

Palánki's episcopal motto is Jesus est resurrectio et vita ("Jesus is the resurrection and the life").
