= József Grősz =

Hungarian politician and prelate

His Excellency József Grősz
- Archbishop of Kalocsa
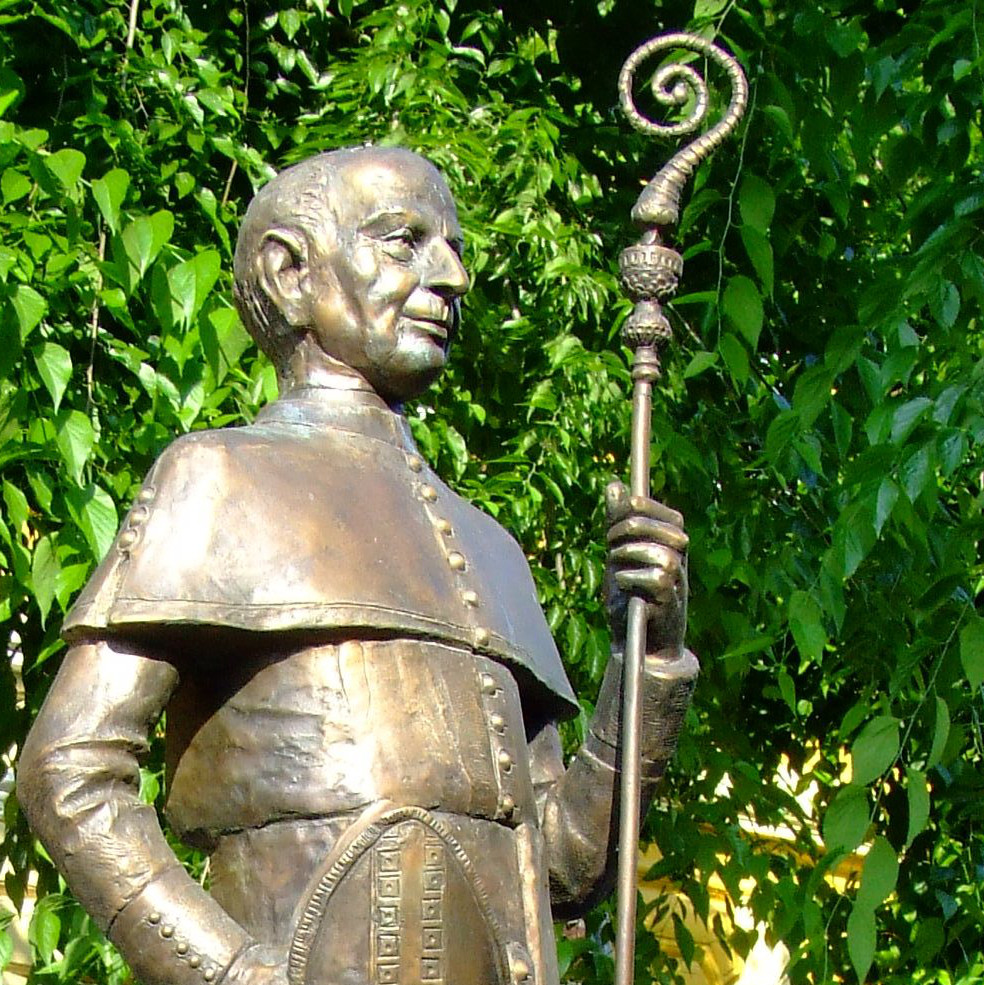
- Statue of Grősz
- Church: Roman Catholic Church
- Archdiocese: Archdiocese of Kalocsa-Kecskemét
- In office: 1943 — 1961
- Previous posts: Bishop of Szombathely; Coadjutor Bishop of Győr

Orders
- Ordination: 15 July 1911
- Consecration: 24 February 1929 by Jusztinián György Serédi

Personal details
- Born: 9 December 1887 Féltorony, Austria-Hungary
- Died: October 3, 1961 (aged 73) Kalocsa, Hungary

József Grősz (December 9, 1887 – October 3, 1961) was a Hungarian politician and prelate of the Roman Catholic Church. From 1943 until his death 18 years later, he served as the Archbishop of Kalocsa. Despite initially being known for his willingness to co-operate with the Communist government of the time, he was put on trial in 1951. Sentenced to 15 years imprisonment, he was released in March 1956 during the period of de-Stalinization.

== Biography ==
Grősz was born on December 9, 1887, in the Hungarian village of Féltorony (now Halbturn, Austria). After studying in the local Catholic high school, which was run by a group of Benedictine monks, he studied theology at the Pázmáneum seminary. Grősz was ordained as a priest in the Diocese of Győr in 1911. From 1928 to 1936, he served as the coadjutor of the diocese. In 1936 he was appointed the apostolic administrator of the Diocese of Szombathely, of which he became bishop three years later.

== Political activity ==
During much of his career, Grősz sought to protect the Church by refusing to criticise the government of the time. Towards the end of World War II, under the national socialist government of the Arrow Cross Party, he gave a speech in which he announced that he in no way opposed the actions of the fascist régime. He later met with István Antal, the Minister of Propaganda, and discussed how the two could cooperate in order to combat the Communist threat.

In August 1950, in his position as archbishop, he signed an agreement with the Hungarian state in order to settle the fate of 2,000 imprisoned nuns and monks. In this agreement, he committed the Church to supporting the construction of a socialist state and accepted the right of the government to interfere in Church affairs, in return for a promise to allow unrestricted worship and a commitment to reopen eight Catholic schools. As much of the Church continued to protest the violent oppression of religious activities, Grősz was arrested in May 1951 and sentenced to 15 years imprisonment on charges of conspiring with the United States and the Vatican to overthrow the government. He was pardoned in 1956 alongside opposition politicians such as Zoltán Tildy, after supposedly promising to act as a "faithful son of the republic".

Once released from prison, Grősz assumed the leadership of the Hungarian Bishops' Conference and, while serving in this position, was elected to the national council of the governing Popular People's Front.

Grősz's convictions were annulled in 1990 and in 2000 a statue of him was erected in Kalocsa.
