= Tamás Szabó =

Tamás Szabó may refer to:

- Tamás Szabó (bishop) (born 1956), Hungarian Roman Catholic bishop
- Tamás Szabó (politician) (born 1957), Hungarian physician and politician
- Tamás Szabó (musician) (born 1984), Hungarian musician
