= Konkoly =

Konkoly is a Hungarian surname. Notable people with the name include:

- Ágnes Konkoly (born 1987), Hungarian model and Miss Universe Hungary 2012
- Csaba Konkoly (born 1970), Hungarian head coach of handball club Gyöngyösi KK
- István Konkoly (1930–2017), Hungarian Roman Catholic prelate and Bishop of Szombathely
- János Konkoly (1940–2018), Hungarian diver
- Michelle Konkoly (born 1992), Paralympic swimmer from Pennsylvania
- Miklós Konkoly-Thege (1842–1916), Hungarian astronomer and land-owning noble
- Zsófia Konkoly (born 2002), Hungarian Paralympic swimmer

== See also ==
- Konkoly Observatory in Budapest, Hungary
