= Benedek Szabolcs Fekete =

Hungarian Roman Catholic bishop (born 1977)

The Most Reverend Benedek Szabolcs Fekete
- Titular Bishop of Basti, Auxiliary Bishop of Diocese of Szombathely
- Church: Roman Catholic Church
- Appointed: 11 March 2022
- Previous post: Chancellor of curia of the Diocese of Szombathely (2009–2022)

Orders
- Ordination: 26 June 2002
- Consecration: 18 April 2022 by Cardinal Péter Erdő

Personal details
- Born: Benedek Szabolcs Fekete; 17 December 1977 (age 48) Kőszeg, Hungary
- Education: Major Theological Central Seminary in Budapest, Pázmány Péter Catholic University
- Coat of arms

Bishop Benedek Szabolcs Fekete (born 17 December 1977) is a Hungarian Roman Catholic prelate, who currently serves as the Titular Bishop of Basti and Auxiliary bishop of the Roman Catholic Diocese of Szombathely since 11 March 2022.

== Education and pastoral work ==
Fekete was born in Kőszeg, Vas County. After graduation of the primary school education in Kőszegszerdahely during 1984–1992 and the Benedictine Gymnasium Gregor Czuczor in Győr from 1992 to 1996, he joined Major Theological Central Seminary in Budapest, Hungary (1996–2002) and was ordained as a priest for the Diocese of Szombathely on 26 June 2002, after completed his philosophical and theological studies with a Licentiate of Theology degree.

Fekete initially worked as a parish vicar in Szentgotthárd. In addition, in 2004 he obtained a degree in Catholic theology from the Pázmány Péter Catholic University in Budapest. In 2006 Fr. Benedek Szabolcs Fekete became a pastor in Csákánydoroszló and in 2008 he was also the dean of the Őrség deanery.

From 2009 Fekete was pastor of the parish of Sacred Heart of Jesus in Szombathely and chancellor of the diocesan curia. From 2013 to 2016 he was also pastor of the parish of St. Stephen in Szombathely. Furthermore, Benedek Szabolcs Fekete worked from 2013 as a notary at the church court of the Diocese of Szombathely and from 2019 also as head of the department for family pastoral.

== Prelate ==
On 11 March 2022 Fr. Fekete was appointed by Pope Francis as an auxiliary bishop of the Roman Catholic Diocese of Szombathely and Titular Bishop of Basti. On 18 April 2022 he was consecrated as bishop by Cardinal Péter Erdő and other prelates of the Roman Catholic Church in the Our Lady of the Visitation Cathedral in Szombathely.

Catholic Church titles
Preceded by David William Antonio	Titular Bishop of Basti; 2022–present	Incumbent
