= Kecskemét Cathedral =

Coordinates: 46.9073°N 19.6910°E

Co-Cathedral of the Ascension of the Lord
- Urunk Mennybemenetele Társszékesegyház
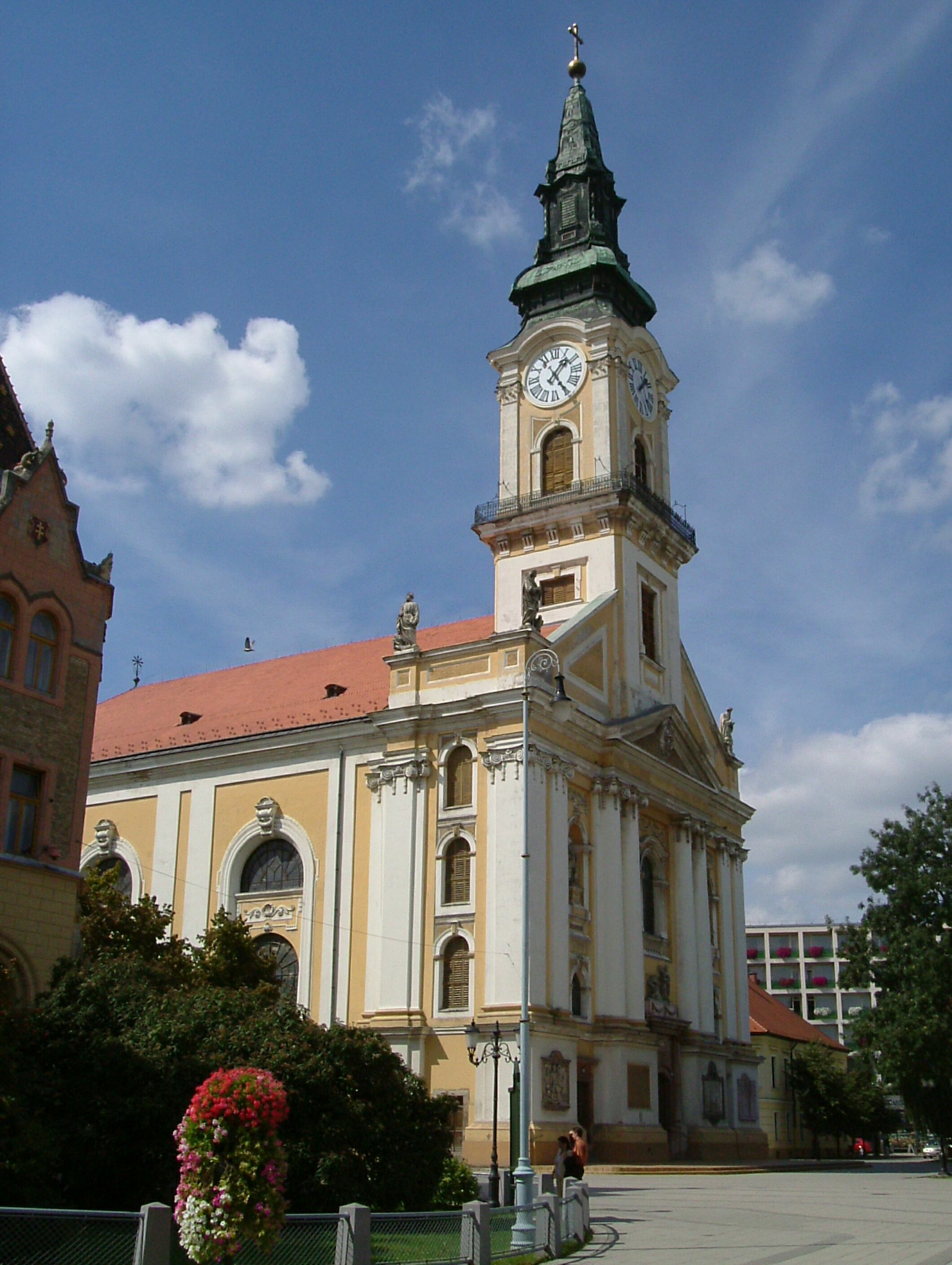
- Co-Cathedral of the Ascension of the Lord
- Location: Kecskemét
- Country: Hungary
- Denomination: Roman Catholic Church

The Co-Cathedral of the Ascension of the Lord (Hungarian: Urunk Mennybemenetele Társszékesegyház) also called Kecskemét Cathedral, also called the Great Church, is a religious building affiliated with the Catholic Church located in the city of Kecskemét, Hungary, serves as the Co-Cathedral or alternate cathedral of the Archdiocese of Kalocsa-Kecskemét. It is dedicated to the Ascension of Christ.

The church was built between 1774 and 1806 in the Baroque style and remains the largest church in the Pannonian Plain. The original design corresponds to Gáspár Osvald, but the construction management was entrusted to Balthasar Fischer. Already in 1819 the tower of the church burned down, and had to be renewed until 1863 then receiving its current form.

== See also ==
- Roman Catholicism in Hungary
- List of cathedrals in Hungary

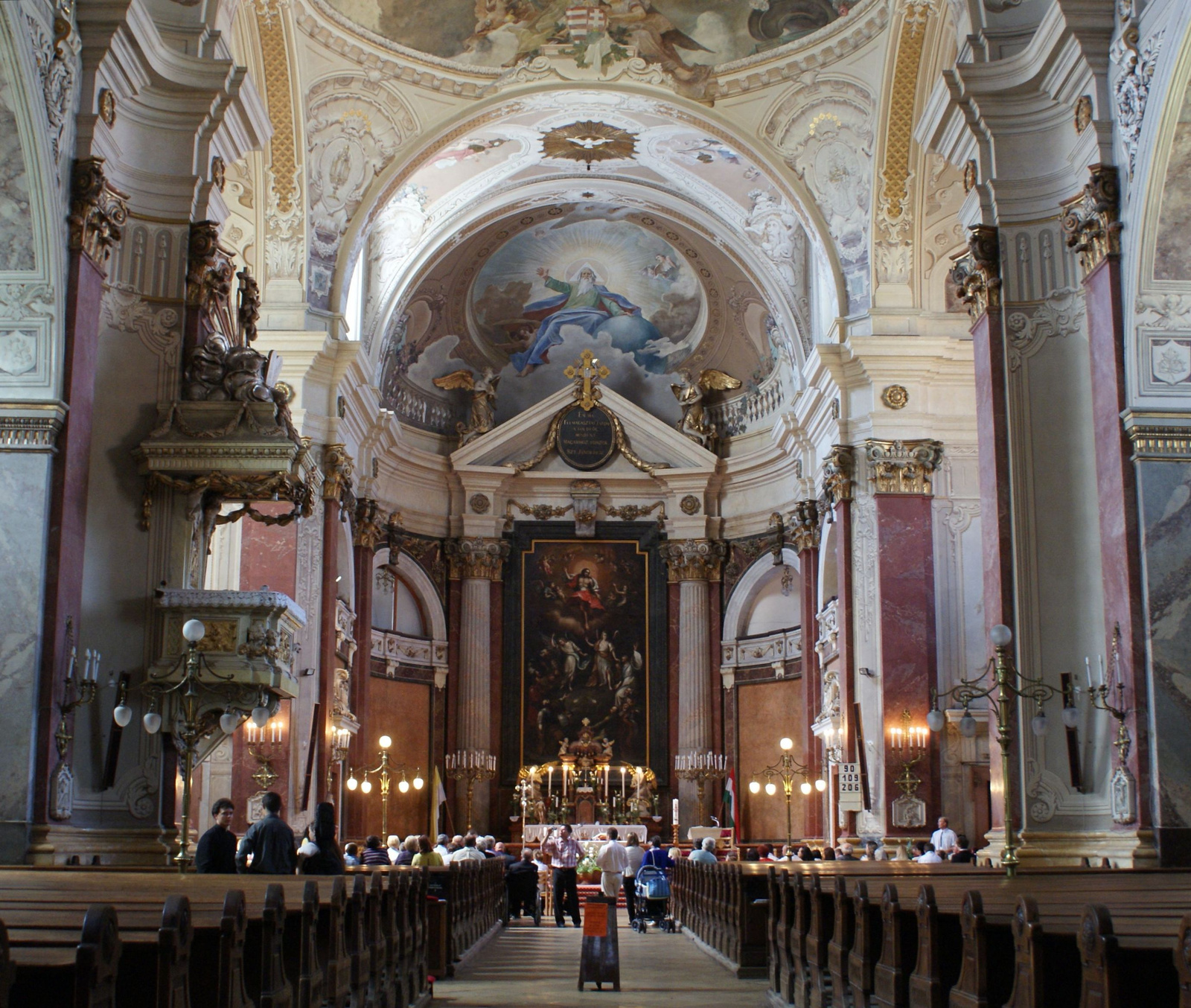
internal view
