= Ottokár Prohászka =

- Bishop of Székesfehérvár
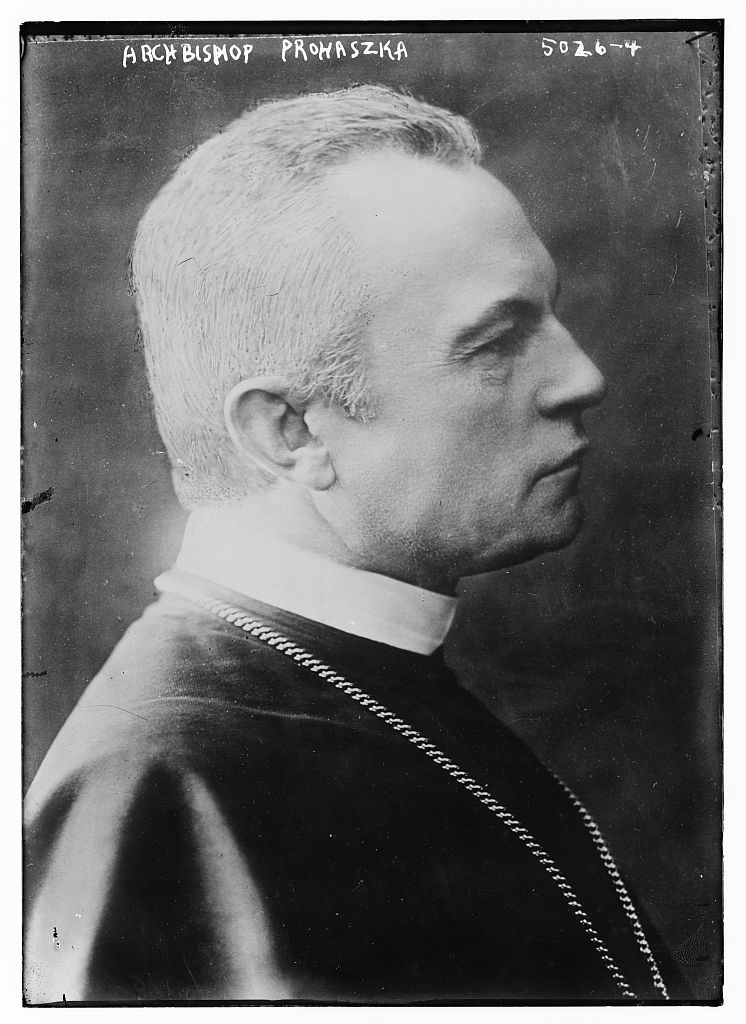
- Ottokár Prohászka circa 1918
- Church: Catholic Church
- Diocese: Diocese of Székesfehérvár
- In office: 11 December 1905 – 2 April 1927
- Predecessor: Gyula Városy
- Successor: Lajos Shvoy

Orders
- Ordination: 30 October 1881
- Consecration: 21 December 1905 by Giuseppe Melchiorre Sarto

Personal details
- Born: 10 October 1858 Nitra, Military District of Preßburg, Kingdom of Hungary
- Died: 2 April 1927 (aged 68) Budapest, Kingdom of Hungary

Ottokár Prohászka (Hungarian: Prohászka Ottokár; 10 October 1858 – 2 April 1927) was a Hungarian Roman Catholic theologian and Bishop of Székesfehérvár from 1905 until his death.

Prohászka was born in Nyitra (today Nitra, Slovakia). In October 1918, he published the influential antisemitic tract Kultúra és Terror (Culture and Terror), which contributed to the increase in violent antisemitism that culminated in the White Terror. Prohászka has been described as "one of the founders of political antisemitism in Hungary".

He died in Budapest.

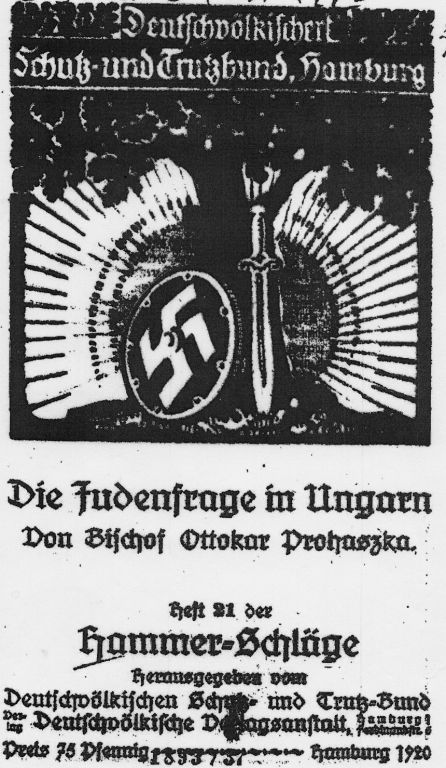
"The Jewish question in Hungary", written by Prohászka in 1920.
