= János Székely (bishop) =

Hungarian Catholic prelate (born 1964)

His Excellency János Székely
- Bishop; Bishop of Szombathely
- Bishop Székely in 2013
- Province: Szombathely
- See: Szombathely
- Appointed: 18 June 2017
- Installed: 18 June 2017
- Predecessor: András Veres
- Previous posts: Titular Bishop of Febiana, Tunis (2007-2008); Auxiliary Bishop of Febiana (2007-2008)

Orders
- Ordination: by 5 January 2008
- Consecration: by Péter Erdő
- Rank: Bishop

Personal details
- Born: János Székely; 7 June 1964 (age 62) Budapest, Hungary
- Denomination: Catholic Church
- Coat of arms

János Székely (born 7 June 1964 in Budapest) is a Hungarian prelate of the Roman Catholic Church. He has been the Bishop of Szombathely since 2017. His apologetical work The Door of Faith has been published in English 2024.

== Works in English ==
- The Door of Faith. Queen of Peace Media, 2024. ISBN 978-1947701243

Catholic Church titles
Preceded by András Veres	Bishop of Szombathely; 2017–	Succeeded by ---
