= Balázs Bábel =

Hungarian Roman Catholic archbishop (born 1950)

His Excellency Balázs Bábel
- Archbishop Emeritus of Kalocsa–Kecskemét
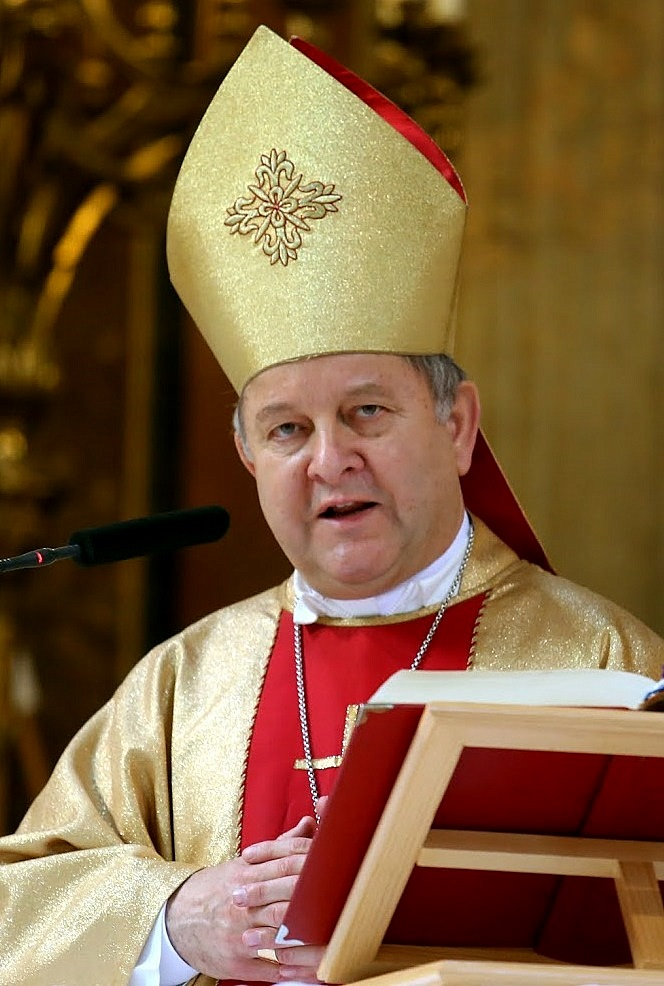
- Church: Catholic Church
- Archdiocese: Kalocsa–Kecskemét
- Appointed: 24 February 1999
- Installed: 25 June 1999
- Term ended: 3 September 2026
- Predecessor: László Dankó
- Successor: Ferenc Palánki

Orders
- Ordination: 19 June 1976 by Mihály Endrey-Eipel
- Consecration: 10 April 1999 by László Paskai

Personal details
- Born: 18 October 1950 (age 75) Gyón, Hungary
- Motto: Pro regno Dei
- Coat of arms

Balázs Bábel (born 18 October 1950) is a Hungarian Roman Catholic prelate who served as the Archbishop of Kalocsa–Kecskemét from 1999 to 2026. He was appointed coadjutor archbishop of the archdiocese on 24 February 1999 and succeeded Archbishop László Dankó on 25 June 1999. On 3 September 2026, Pope Leo XIV accepted his resignation from the pastoral government of the archdiocese and appointed Ferenc Palánki as his successor.

== Early life and priesthood ==
Bábel was born in Gyón, then in the Hungarian People's Republic, on 18 October 1950. He was ordained a priest for the Diocese of Vác on 19 June 1976.

From 1976 to 1978 he served as a chaplain in Valkó, followed by chaplaincies in Tápiószecső and Tóalmás from 1978 to 1980, Budapest-Pestújhely from 1980 to 1984, and Budapest-Pacsirtatelep from 1984 to 1990. He became a member of the Regnum Marianum priestly community in 1981 and received a doctorate in theology in Budapest in 1983.

From 1990 to 1992, Bábel was prefect of the Central Seminary in Budapest. From 1992 to 1997 he served as spiritual director of the seminary and taught at the Faculty of Theology of Pázmány Péter Catholic University and at the Kalazantinum. From 1997 to 1999 he was rector of the St. Charles Borromeo Seminary in Vác and director of the correspondence programme of the College of Theology in Eger. In 1997, Pope John Paul II awarded him the title of papal chaplain.

== Episcopate ==
On 24 February 1999, Bábel was appointed coadjutor archbishop of Kalocsa–Kecskemét. The appointment was recorded in the Acta Apostolicae Sedis as part of the provisions of the Congregation for Bishops. He was consecrated a bishop in Kalocsa on 10 April 1999, with Cardinal László Paskai as principal consecrator. He became archbishop of Kalocsa–Kecskemét on 25 June 1999 and received the pallium on 15 August 1999.

During his episcopate, Bábel held several responsibilities within the Hungarian Catholic Bishops' Conference. He chaired the National Council for Church Art and Monument Protection until 2006, chaired the Ecumenical Commission, and chaired the Culture and Mass Media Commission from 2006. He was also a member of the permanent council of the Hungarian Catholic Bishops' Conference from 2005 to 2015.

== Later years ==
During his tenure as archbishop, Bábel was involved in the preservation and restoration of ecclesiastical buildings and cultural heritage in Kalocsa. In a 2024 interview with Válasz Online, he discussed the restoration of the Kalocsa Cathedral, the archiepiscopal palace, and other diocesan buildings, as well as his handling of allegations of sexual abuse and disciplinary proceedings involving clergy in the archdiocese.

On 3 September 2026, the Holy See announced that Pope Leo XIV had accepted Bábel's resignation from the pastoral government of the Archdiocese of Kalocsa–Kecskemét. Ferenc Palánki, previously Bishop of Debrecen–Nyíregyháza, was appointed metropolitan archbishop in his place.

== Honours and awards ==
- 2002 – Honorary citizen of Dabas
- 2007 – Pro Patria Award
- 2008 – Márton Áron Award
- 2009 – Mindszenty Memorial Medal
- 2010 – Award for the City of Kalocsa
- 2010 – Middle Cross of the Order of Merit of the Republic of Hungary
