= István Katona =

Hungarian Roman Catholic prelate (1928–2025)

The Most Reverend István Katona
- Auxiliary Bishop Emeritus of Eger
- Archdiocese: Eger
- Appointed: 10 October 1997
- Term ended: 25 November 2013
- Other post: Titular Bishop of Brixellum (1989–2025)
- Previous post: Auxiliary Bishop of Vác (1989–1997)

Orders
- Ordination: 7 June 1953
- Consecration: 9 December 1989 by László Paskai, Izidor István Marosi, Endre Gyulay

Personal details
- Born: 3 October 1928 Nagykáta, Hungary
- Died: 21 October 2025 (aged 97) Nyíregyháza, Hungary
- Motto: Mane nobiscum Iesu
- Coat of arms

Styles of István Katona
- Reference style: His Excellency; The Most Reverend
- Spoken style: Your Excellency
- Religious style: Bishop

István Katona (3 October 1928 – 21 October 2025) was a Hungarian Roman Catholic prelate.

Katona was born in Nagykáta on 3 October 1928. He was ordained a priest on 7 June 1953 in Szeged.

On 3 November 1989, Pope John Paul II appointed him titular bishop of Brixellum and auxiliary bishop of Vác. He was consecrated bishop on 9 December 1989. The Hungarian Catholic Bishops' Conference awarded him with the gold grade of the Pro Pedagogia Christiana award. When he turned 75, he asked Pope John Paul II to retire him according to ecclesiastical regulations but the Pope refused.

On 25 November 2013, Pope Francis accepted his resignation and he retired; at that time he was the oldest active bishop in Europe.

Katona died in Nyíregyháza on 21 October 2025 at the age of 97.

Catholic Church titles
Preceded by —	Auxiliary Bishop of Eger; 1997–2013	Succeeded by —
Preceded by —	Auxiliary Bishop of Vác; 1989–1997	Succeeded by —
Preceded by Jean-Jerôme Adam	Titular Bishop of Brixellum; 1989–2025	Succeeded by Vacant
