= Jusztin Nándor Takács =

Hungarian Catholic prelate

Jusztin Nándor Takács O.C.D.
- Bishop of Székesfehérvár
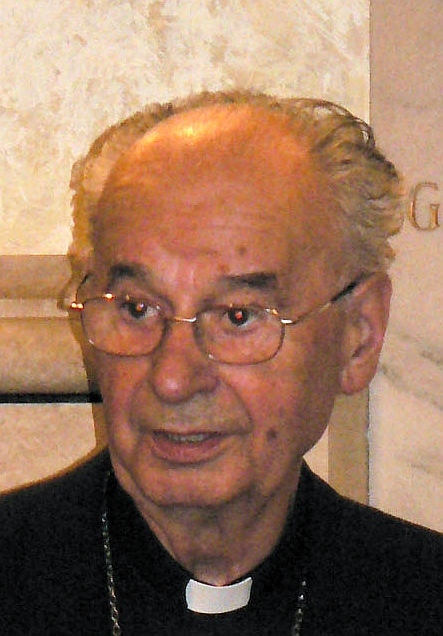
- Takács in 2007
- Church: Catholic Church
- Diocese: Diocese of Székesfehérvár
- In office: 13 September 1991 – 4 April 2003
- Predecessor: Gyula Szakos
- Successor: Antal Spányi
- Previous posts: Coadjutor Bishop of Székesfehérvár (1990-1991); Titular Bishop of Carcabia (1988-1990); Auxiliary Bishop of Székesfehérvár (1988-1990)

Orders
- Ordination: 28 October 1951
- Consecration: 11 February 1989 by László Paskai

Personal details
- Born: 15 January 1927 Rábacsanak, Kingdom of Hungary
- Died: 11 July 2016 (aged 89) Székesfehérvár, Hungary

Jusztin Nándor Takács (15 January 1927 – 11 July 2016) was a Hungarian Catholic prelate and Carmelite friar. He was born in Rábacsanak, Hungary. He served as the Bishop of Székesfehérvár from 1991 until his retirement in 2003.

Takács died on 11 July 2016 from an extended illness in Székesfehérvár, Hungary, aged 89.
