= István Konkoly =

Hungarian prelate

- Bishop of Szombathely
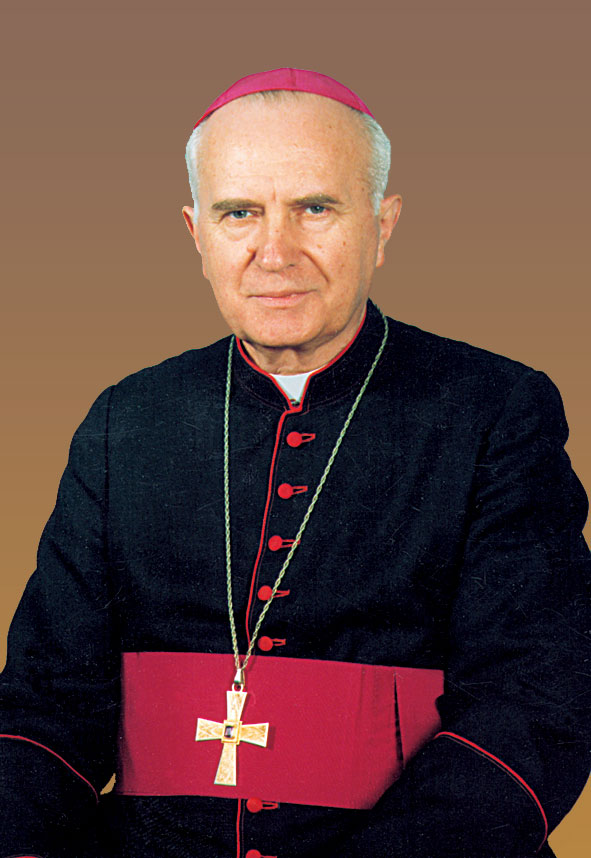
- István Konkoly in 2006
- Church: Roman Catholic Church
- In office: 1987–2006
- Predecessor: Árpád Fábián
- Successor: András Veres

Orders
- Ordination: 20 June 1954
- Consecration: 11 July 1987 by László Paskai

Personal details
- Born: 5 March 1930; Kerkaszentmiklós, Hungary
- Died: 20 November 2017 (aged 87); Szombathely, Hungary
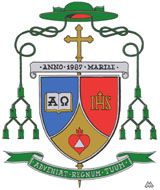
- Coat of arms

István Konkoly (5 March 1930 – 20 November 2017) was a Hungarian prelate of the Roman Catholic Church, who served as Bishop of Szombathely from 1987 to 2006.

Konkoly died on 20 November 2017, at the age of 87.

== Works ==
- Hittan ismeretek. Felkészülés a beavató szentségek felvételére; ed. Konkoly, István; Egyházmegyei Hatóság, Szombathely, 2000
- Sill Aba, Ferenc – Konkoly, István: A szombathelyi Püspöki Palota; MG Kereskedelmi és Szolgáltató Bt., Szombathely, 2004
- "Hirdessétek az evangéliumot...". Válogatás Konkoly István szombathelyi püspök főpásztori szolgálata alatt elhangzott beszédeiből, előadásaiból és interjúiból, 1987-2004, 1-2.; ed. Rába Imre; Szombathelyi Egyházmegyei Hatóság, Szombathely, 2005
- Emlékeim püspöki szolgálatom idejéből, 1987-2015; Szülőföld, Szombathely–Gencsapáti, 2015

Catholic Church titles
Preceded by Árpád Fábián	Bishop of Szombathely; 1987–2006	Succeeded by András Veres
