= Co-Cathedral of St. Anthony of Padua, Békéscsaba =

Coordinates: 46.6813°N 21.0982°E

Co-Cathedral of St. Anthony of Padua
- Páduai Szent Antal-társszékesegyház
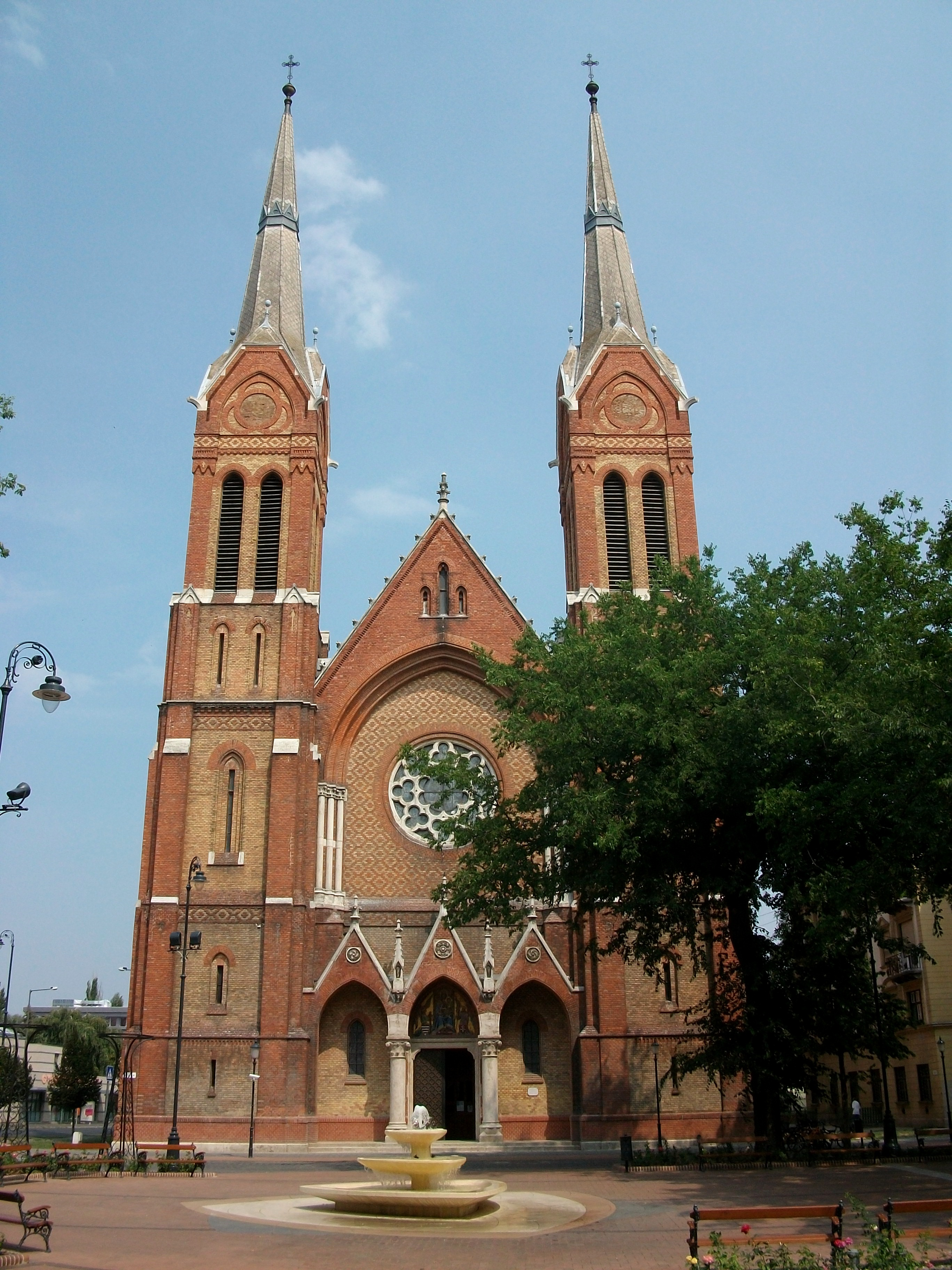
- Co-Cathedral of St. Anthony of Padua
- Location: Békéscsaba
- Country: Hungary
- Denomination: Roman Catholic Church

The Co-Cathedral of St. Anthony of Padua (Hungarian: Páduai Szent Antal-társszékesegyház) also called Békéscsaba Cathedral is the name given to a religious building located in the city of Békéscsaba, in the European country of Hungary, which was built in 1910 with a neo-Gothic style.

The temple follows the Roman or Latin rite and since 2010 serves as the Co-Cathedral or alternate cathedral of the Diocese of Szeged-Csanád. It is the second largest church in the city after a Protestant church. Its tower reaches 61 meters high.

It is under the pastoral responsibility of the bishop László Kiss-Rigó. It was dedicated to St. Anthony of Lisbon was a priest of the Franciscan Order, Portuguese preacher and theologian, venerated as a saint and Doctor of the Church by Catholicism.

== See also ==
- Roman Catholicism in Hungary
- List of cathedrals in Hungary
- Co-Cathedral of St. Anthony of Padua

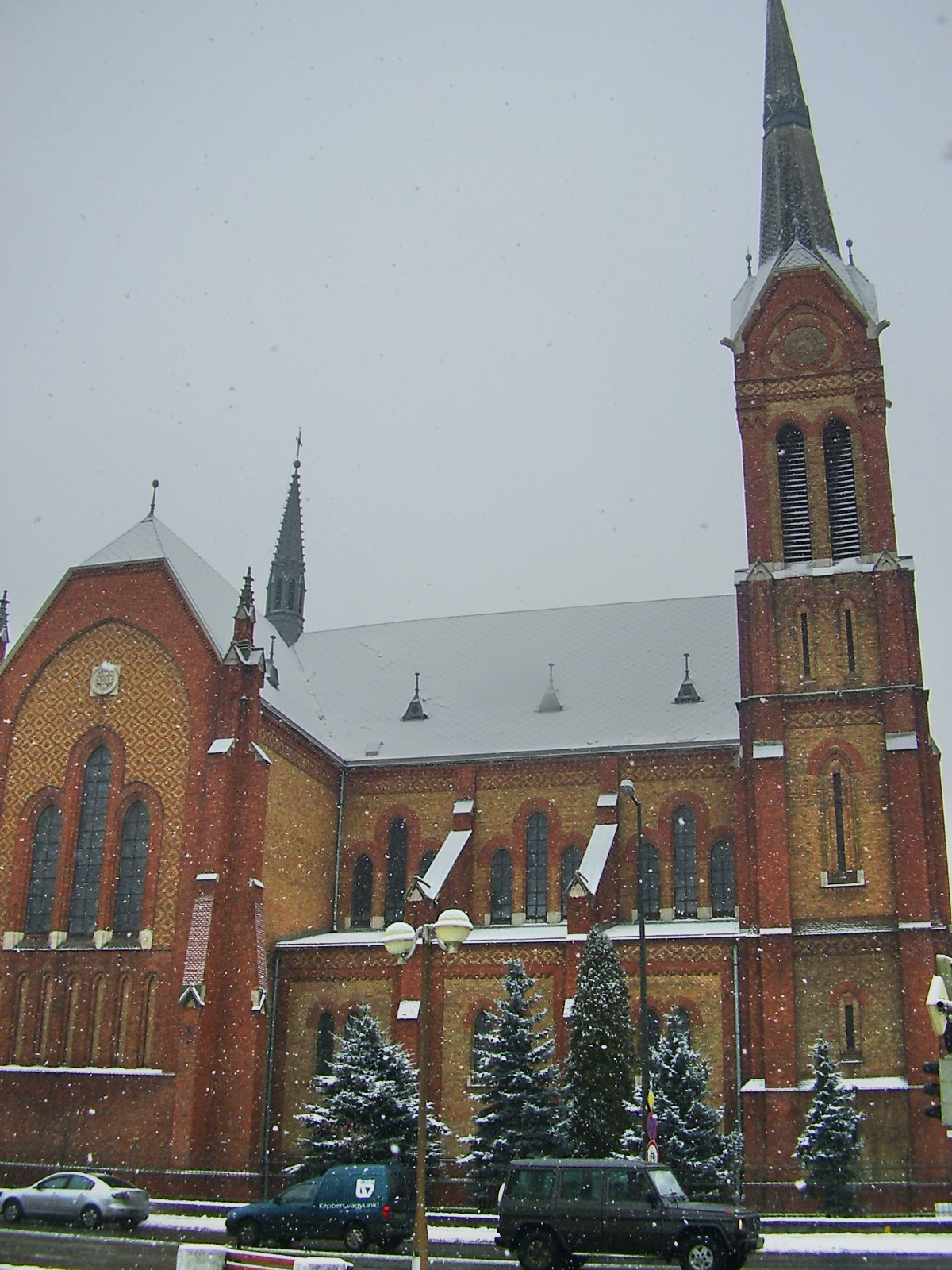
view of the temple in winter
