= St. Anne's Cathedral, Debrecen =

Coordinates: 47.5269°N 21.6300°E

St. Anne's Cathedral
- Szent Anna székesegyház
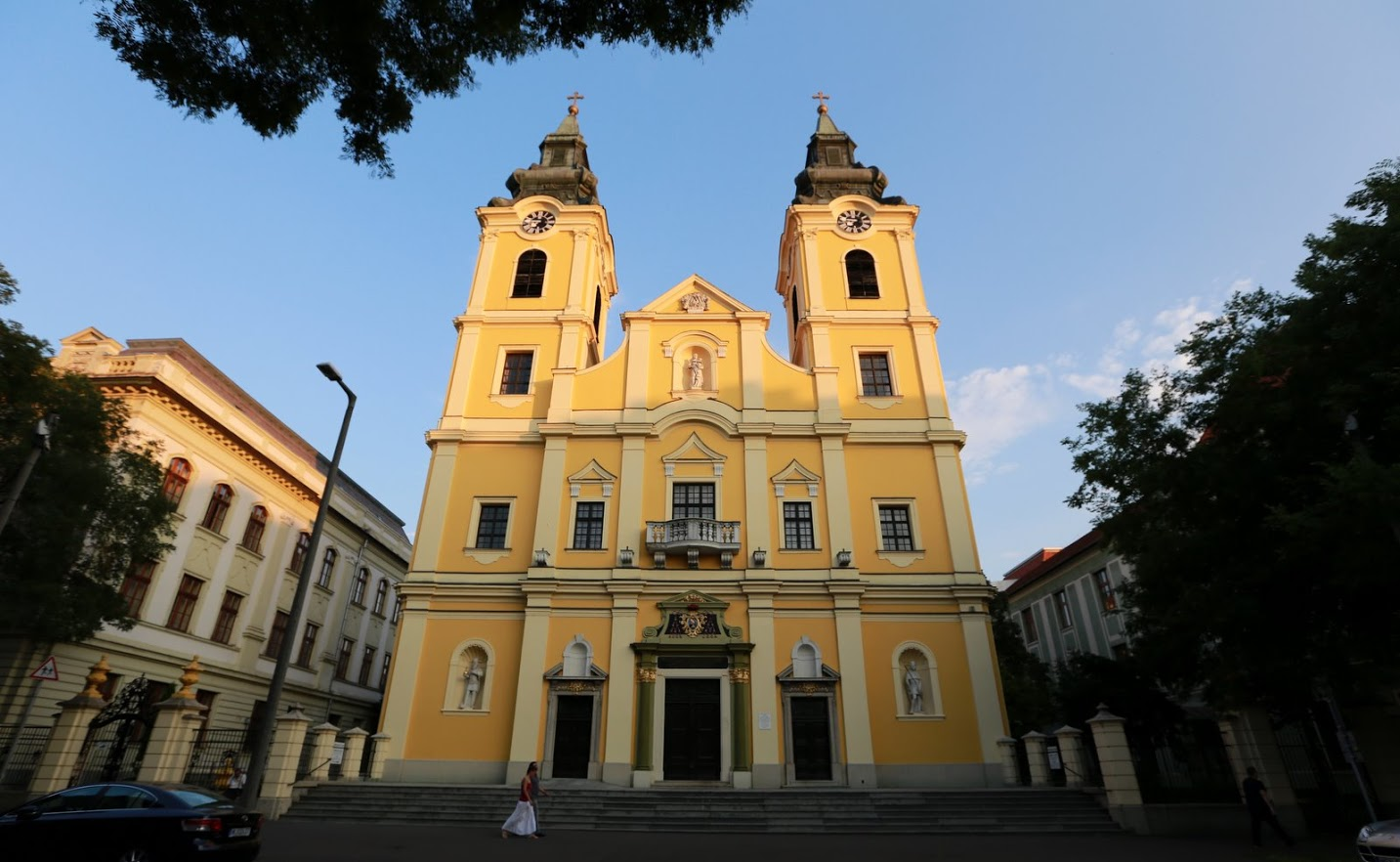
- St. Anne's Cathedral
- Location: Debrecen
- Country: Hungary
- Denomination: Roman Catholic Church

The St. Anne's Cathedral (Hungarian: Szent Anna székesegyház) also called Debrecen Cathedral It is a Catholic religious building that since 1993 works as the cathedral of the Diocese of Debrecen-Nyíregyháza, is located in the city of Debrecen, Hungary.

== History of its construction ==
The baroque church was built in 1721 by the Milanese architect Giovanni Battista Carlone and dedicated to St. Anne in 1746. It had been commissioned by Cardinal Imre Csáky.

In 1811, both of the church’s towers were damaged by a fire.

In 1834, both of the two towers were rebuilt according to the architectural plans of Ferenc Povolny.

In 1928, new entrances were added and a general restoration of the building was initiated.

An entrance with a wide staircase was added, as well as the three statues on the facade dedicated to St. Emeric of Hungary, St. Stephen, the Virgin Mary and the Baby Jesus.

== See also ==
- Roman Catholicism in Hungary
- List of cathedrals in Hungary
- St. Anne

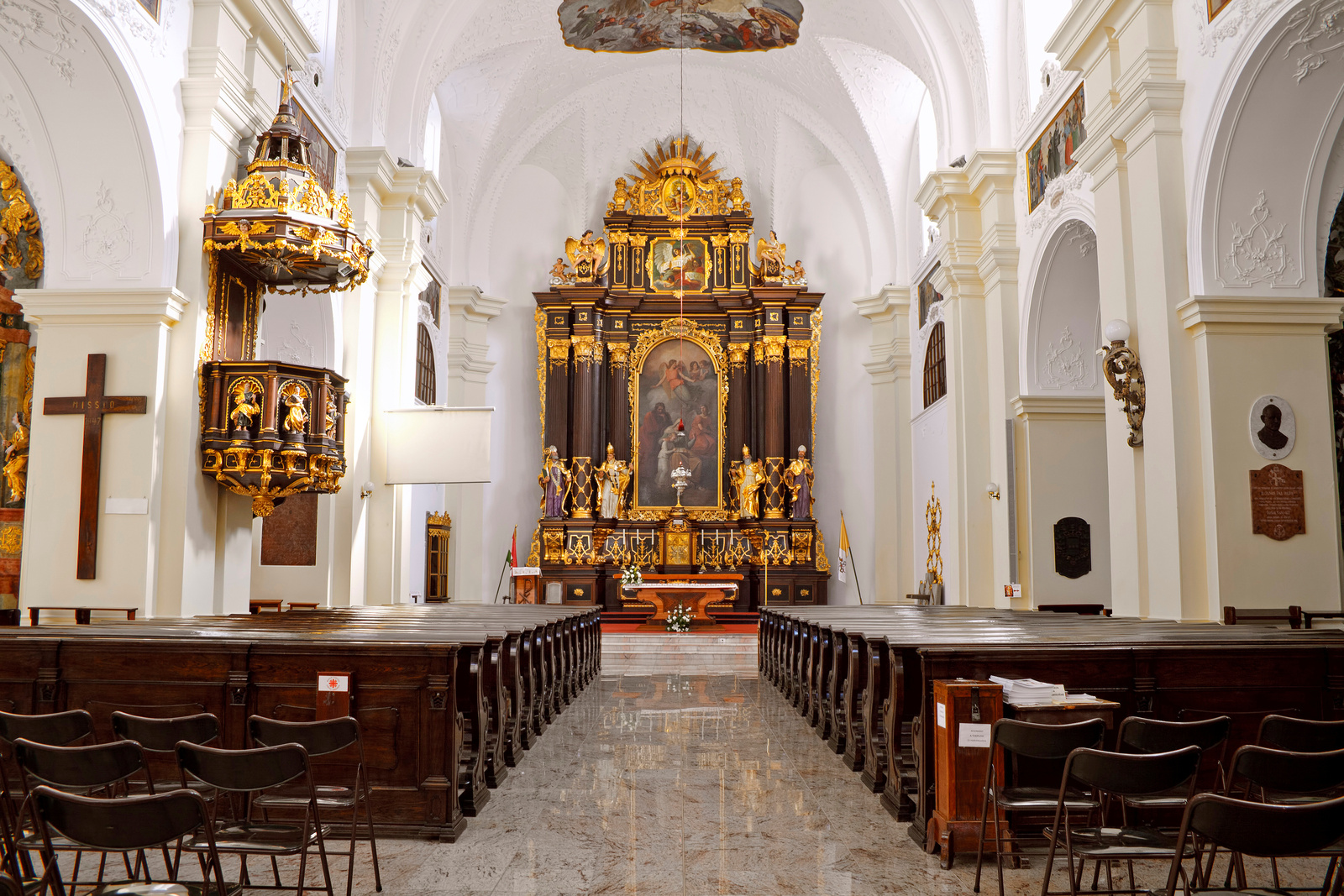
Internal view
