= Antal Spányi =

Hungarian Catholic prelate (born 1950)

- Bishop of Székesfehérvár
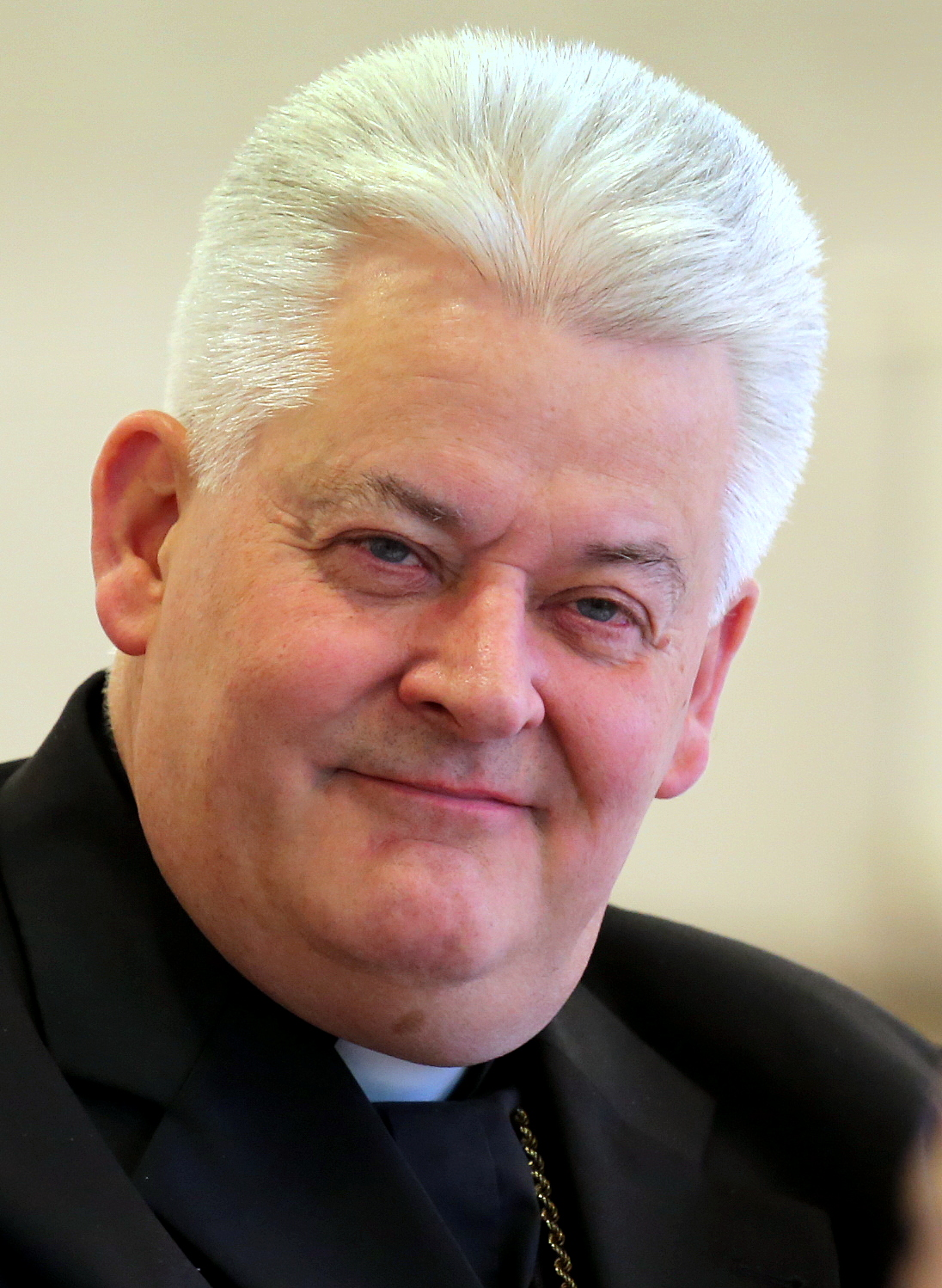
- Spányi in 2013
- Church: Catholic
- Diocese: Székesfehérvár
- Appointed: 4 April 2003
- Predecessor: Jusztin Nándor Takács
- Previous posts: Titular bishop of Tharros (1998–2003); Auxiliary bishop of Esztergom–Budapest (1998–2003)

Orders
- Ordination: 19 July 1976 by László Lékai
- Consecration: 28 March 1998 by László Paskai

Personal details
- Born: 13 November 1950 (age 75) Budapest, Hungary
- Motto: Laudetur Jesus Christus (Jesus Christ be praised)
- Coat of arms

Antal Spányi (born 13 November 1950) is a Hungarian prelate of the Catholic Church, being the bishop of Székesfehérvár since 2004. He was previously the auxiliary bishop of Esztergom–Budapest and titular bishop of Tharros.

He is also the president of Caritas Hungary.
