= Püspökszilágy =

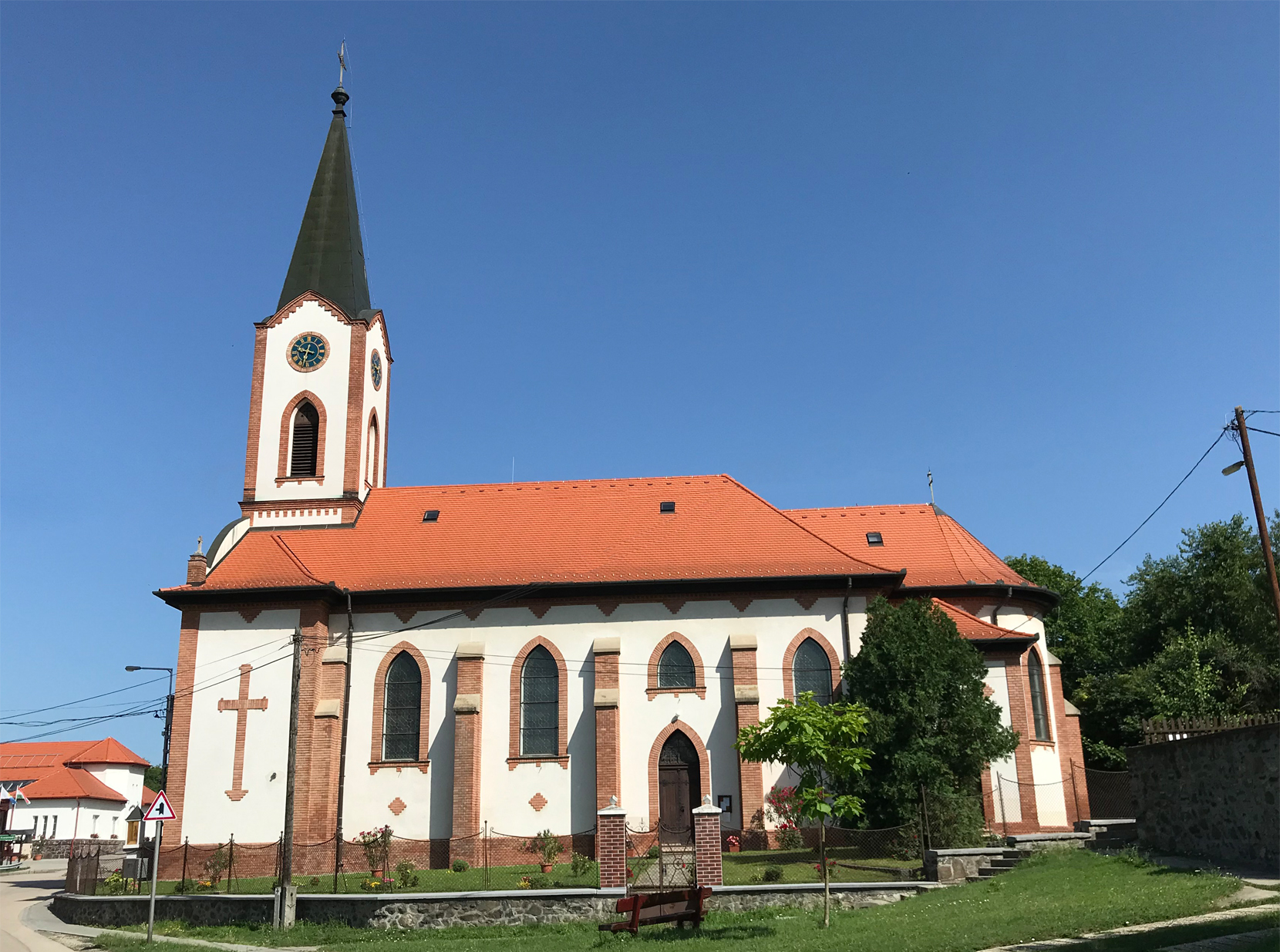
- St. Martin's Church in Püspökszilágy

- Coat of arms

- Location of Püspökszilágy in Hungary
- Coordinates: 47.74062°N 19.31523°E
- Country: Hungary
- Region: Central Hungary
- County: Pest
- Subregion: Váci
- Rank: Village

Area
  - Total: 25.30 km^{2} (9.77 sq mi)

Population (1 January 2008)
  - Total: 759
  - Density: 30.0/km^{2} (77.7/sq mi)
- Time zone: UTC+1 (CET)
  - Summer (DST): UTC+2 (CEST)
- Postal code: 2166
- Area code: +36 27
- KSH code: 04303
- Website: www.puspokszilagy.hu

Püspökszilágy is a village in Pest county, Hungary.
