= Military Ordinariate of Hungary =

Latin Catholic ecclesiastical jurisdiction in Hungary

Military Ordinariate of Hungary Ordinariatus Militaris Hungariae Tábori Püspökség

Catholic

Location
- Country: Hungary
- Metropolitan: Immediately subject to the Holy See

Information
- Denomination: Catholic Church
- Sui iuris church: Latin Church
- Rite: Roman Rite
- Established: 18 April 1994 (32 years ago)

Current leadership
- Pope: Leo XIV
- Bishop: Tibor Berta
- Bishops emeritus: Tamás Szabó; László Bíró

Website
- www.ktp.hu

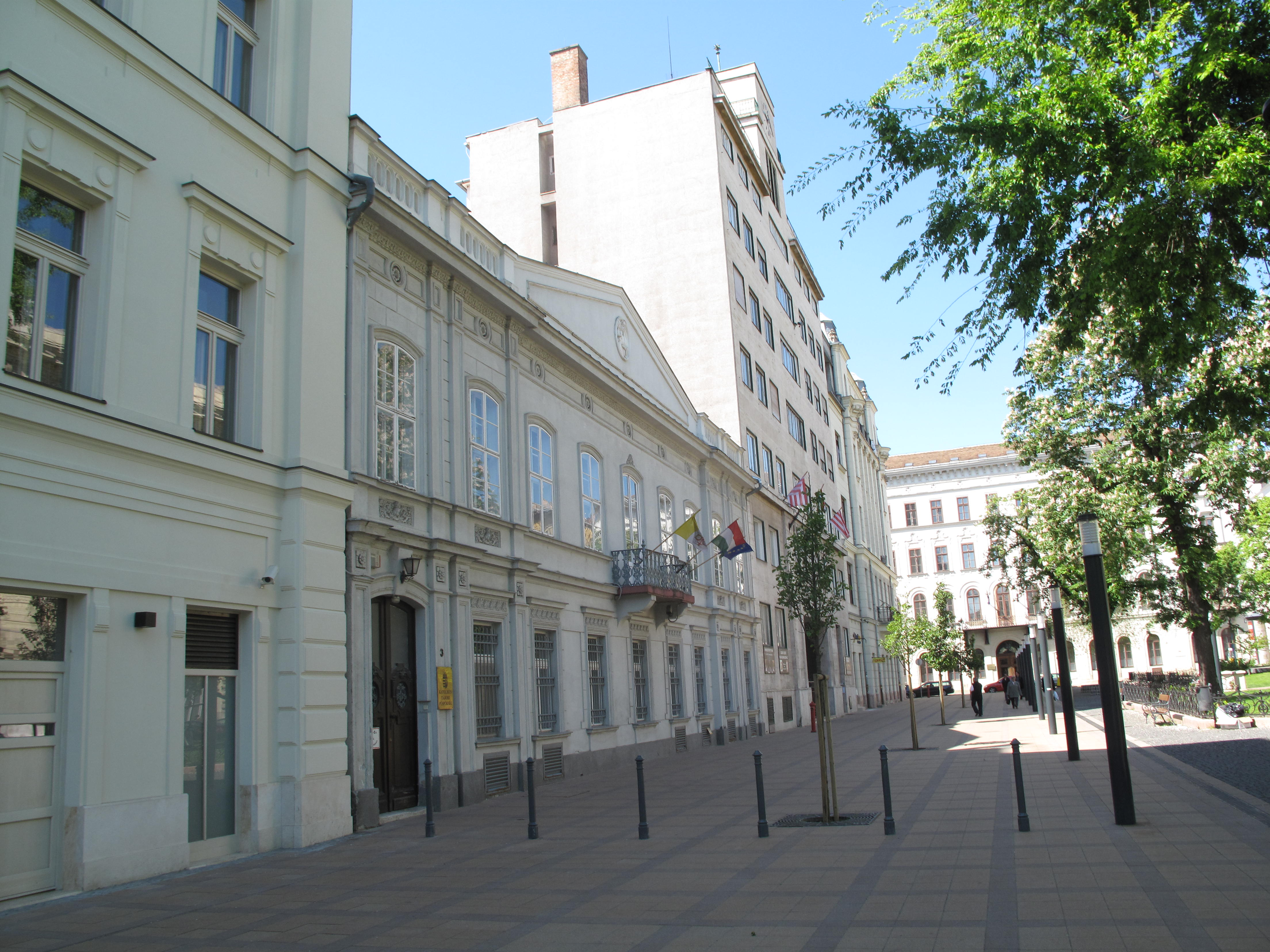
Military Ordinariate of Hungary

The Military Bishopric of Hungary (Hungarian: Tábori Püspökség, Latin: Ordinariatus Militaris Hungariae) is a military ordinariate of the Catholic Church. Immediately subject to the Holy See, it provides pastoral care to Catholics serving in the Hungarian Home Defence Force and their families.

== History ==
The first military bishop was appointed on 23 March 1920, but after the first bishop resigned in 1926 the post fell into abeyance. Nearly seventy years later, a military ordinariate for Hungary was established by Pope John Paul II on 18 April 1994.

== Office holders ==
=== Military bishops ===
- István Zadravecz, O.F.M. (appointed 23 March 1920 – resigned 1926)

=== Military ordinaries ===
- Gáspár Ladocsi (appointed 18 April 1994 – appointed Auxiliary Bishop of Esztergom-Budapest 28 November 2001)
- Tamás Szabó (appointed 28 November 2001 – resigned 15 March 2007)
- László Bíró (appointed 20 November 2008 – resigned 18 February 2021)
- Tibor Berta (appointed 18 February 2021 – present)
