= Cathedral Basilica of Székesfehérvár =

Coordinates: 47.1890°N 18.4181°E

Cathedral Basilica of St. Stephen the King
- Szent István-székesegyház
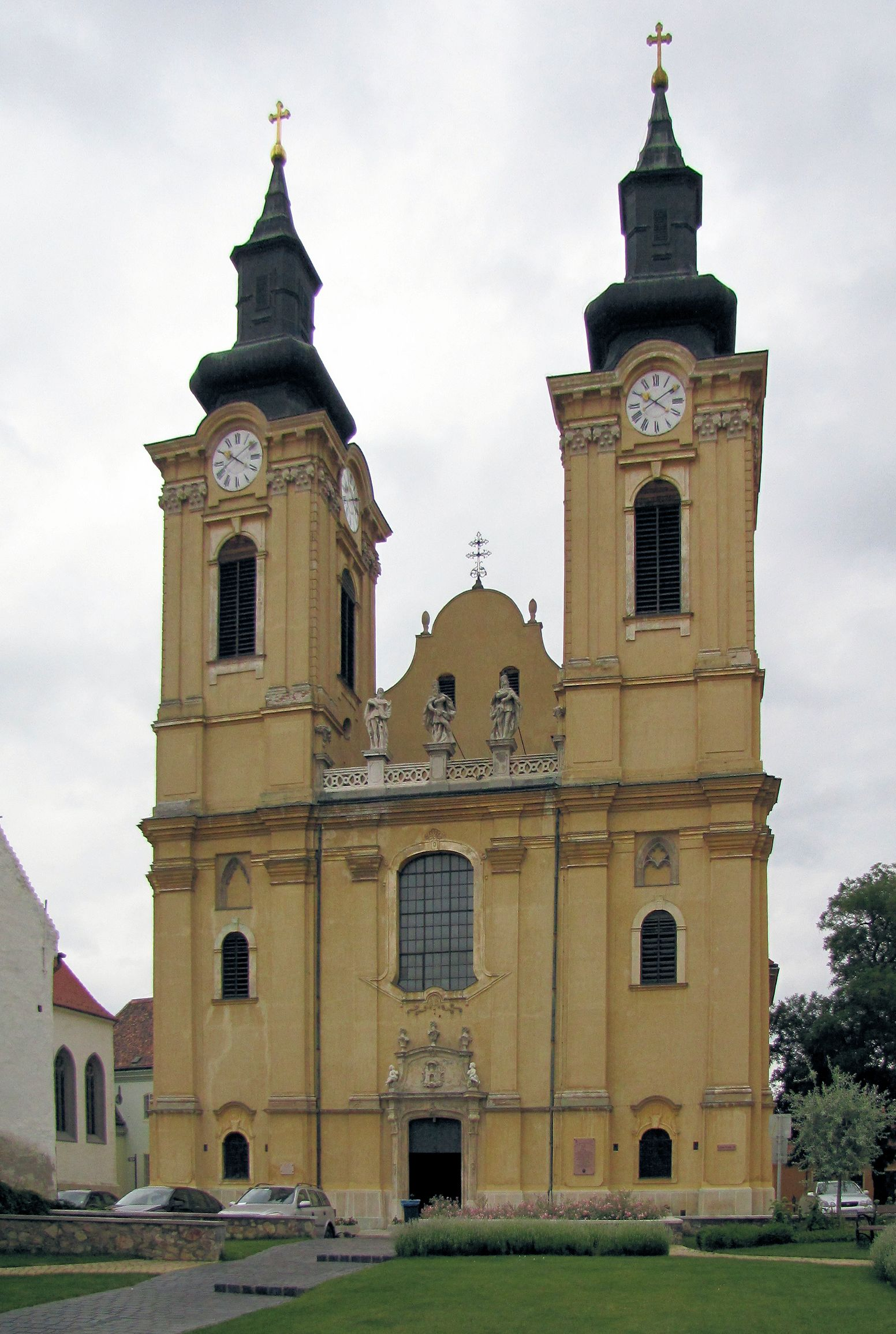
- Cathedral Basilica of St. Stephen the King
- Location: Székesfehérvár
- Country: Hungary
- Denomination: Roman Catholic Church

Architecture
- Style: Baroque
- Years built: 1758-1768

The Cathedral Basilica of St. Stephen the King (Hungarian: Szent István-székesegyház) also called Székesfehérvár Cathedral is the name given to a religious building of the Catholic Church in Hungary which serves as the cathedral of the city of Székesfehérvár. It is therefore the seat of the Diocese of Székesfehérvár (Dioecesis Albae Regalensis or Székesfehérvári egyházmegye), which was created in 1777 by bull "In universa gregis" of Pope Pius VI.

The church was built in Baroque style, between 1758 and 1768. The choir and the altar were designed by the famous Austrian architect Franz Anton Hillebrandt. The interior frescoes depict scenes from the life of King Stephen I, and the altarpiece represents the Stephen king kneeling in front of the Mother of God and was made by Vinzenz Fischer, while the imposing ceiling frescoes are from Johann Cymbala.

== Pulpit ==
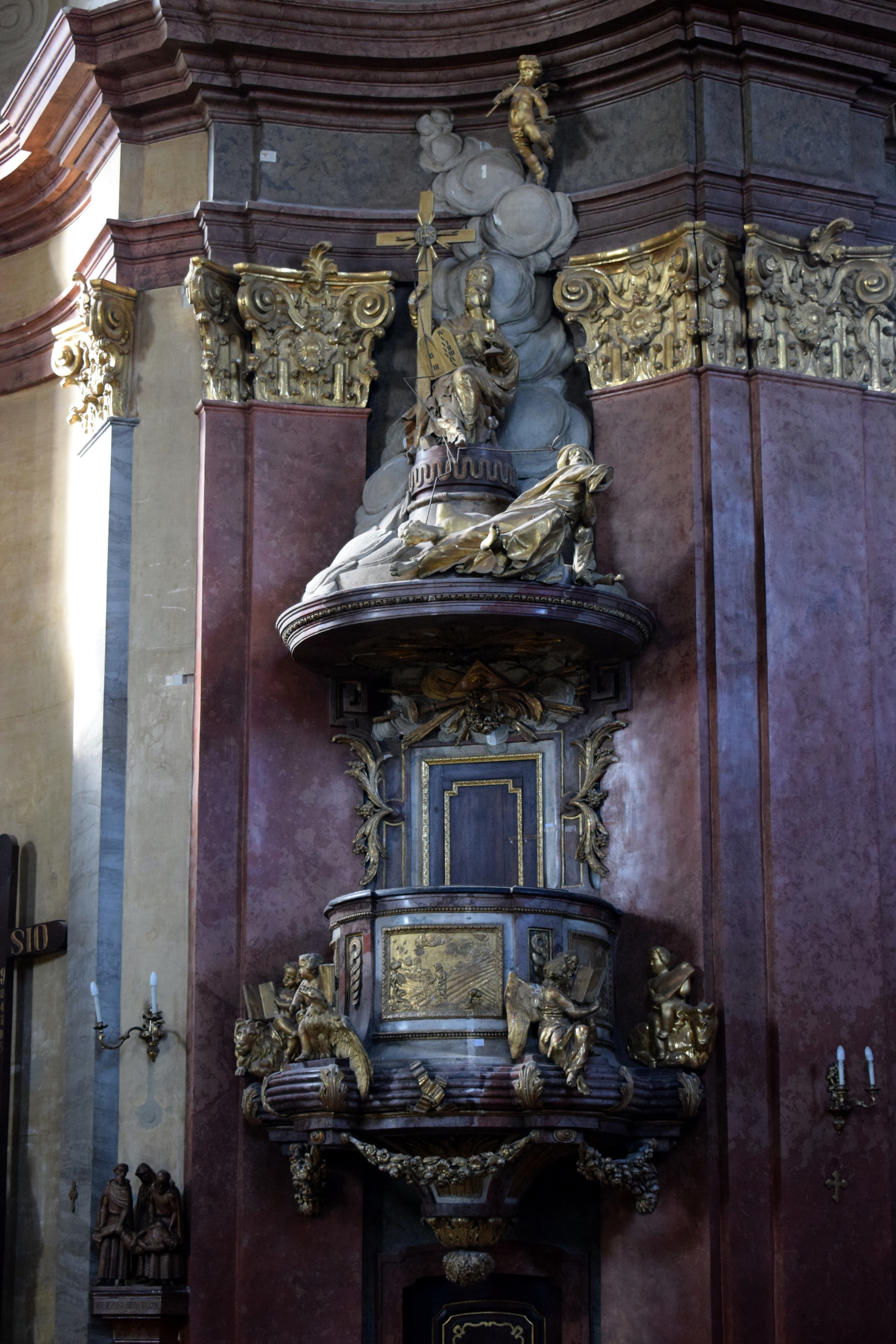
View of the pulpit

The Late Baroque pulpit was built in a sumptuous classicizing style similar to Franz Anton Hillebrandt's main altar. The sculpture group on the top of the abat-voix (Triumph of the Church over Idolatry) represents the same topic as the fresco on the first vault. The frescoes of the church were finished by Johann Cymbal in 1768 giving an approximate date after which the pulpit could have been erected.

The pulpit is a monumental red marble structure with gilded wood sculptures. Cherub-like angels sit on the ledge with the symbols of the tetramorph. The balustrade is decorated with three gilt reliefs (The Good Shepherd, The Sower and Two Sons). An orb of flowers forms a hanging finial under rich garlands. There is sculpted relief above the door with a group of symbols: the Eye of Providence, a horn, a violin, a wreath and a palm branch. The underside of the abat-voix is decorated with a dove, and there is a sculptural group on the top depicting the Triumph of the Church over Idolatry. The figure of the Church is recognizable by the tiara on her head; she is holding a cross, a chalice and the tables of the law. Idolatry is shown as a recumbent male figure, desperately grabbing a little idol, and an ancient bust had fallen on the ground behind his back. The whole group is watched by a cherub playing the flute from the top of white clouds. The choice of topic is an allusion to the conversion of Hungary to Christianity by St. Stephen and the subsequent fall of paganism.

== See also ==
- Roman Catholicism in Hungary
- King Saint Stephen

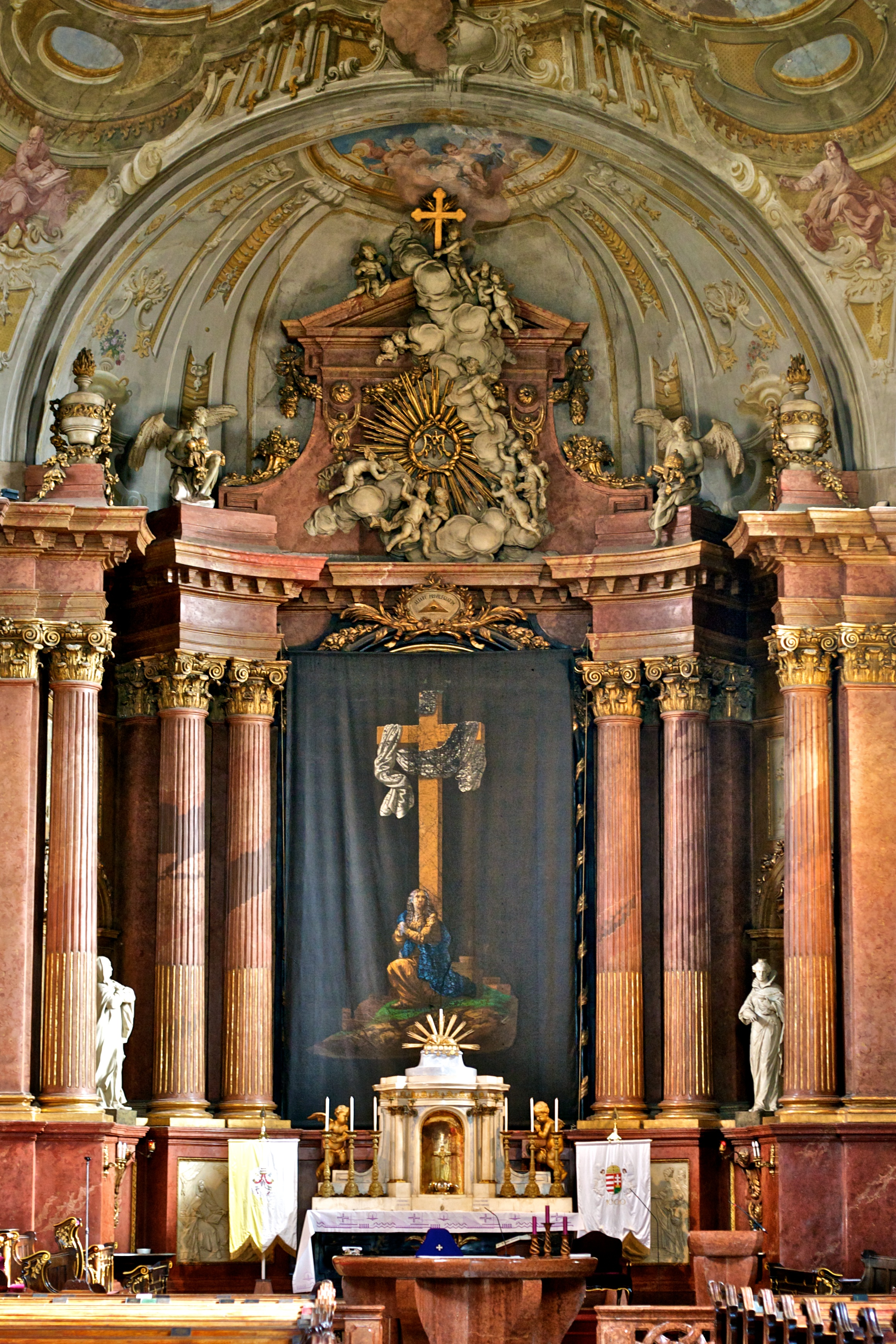
internal view
