= Tamás Szabó (bishop) =

Tamás József Szabó
- Bishop Emeritus of Military Ordinariate of Hungary
- Church: Catholic Church
- In office: 28 November 2001 – 15 March 2007
- Predecessor: Gáspár Ladocsi
- Successor: László Bíró

Orders
- Ordination: 20 August 1988
- Consecration: 12 January 2002 by László Paskai

Personal details
- Born: 30 October 1956 (age 69) Zirc, Veszprém County, Hungarian People's Republic

Tamás Szabó (born 30 October 1956) is a controversial and former Hungarian prelate of the Roman Catholic Church.

== Biography ==
Born in Zirc, he was ordained a priest on 20 August 1988.

On 28 November 2001 he was appointed the leading Catholic chaplain in the Hungarian military by Pope John Paul II. Szabó received his episcopal consecration on 12 January 2002 from László Cardinal Paskai, with Archbishop István Seregély and Bishop Lajos Pápai serving as co-consecrators.

He resigned as Bishop for the Catholic Military Ordinariate of Hungary on 15 March 2007 in order to pursue marriage with a woman he met in the Church's charismatic movement. Other sources report this woman works in the Ministry of Defence. Szabó told Népszabadság that, "I do not want to talk about my private life. I don't think that is a public matter."
