= Endre Gyulay =

Hungarian Roman Catholic bishop (1930–2024)

His Excellency Endre Gyulay
- Bishop Emeritus of Szeged–Csanád
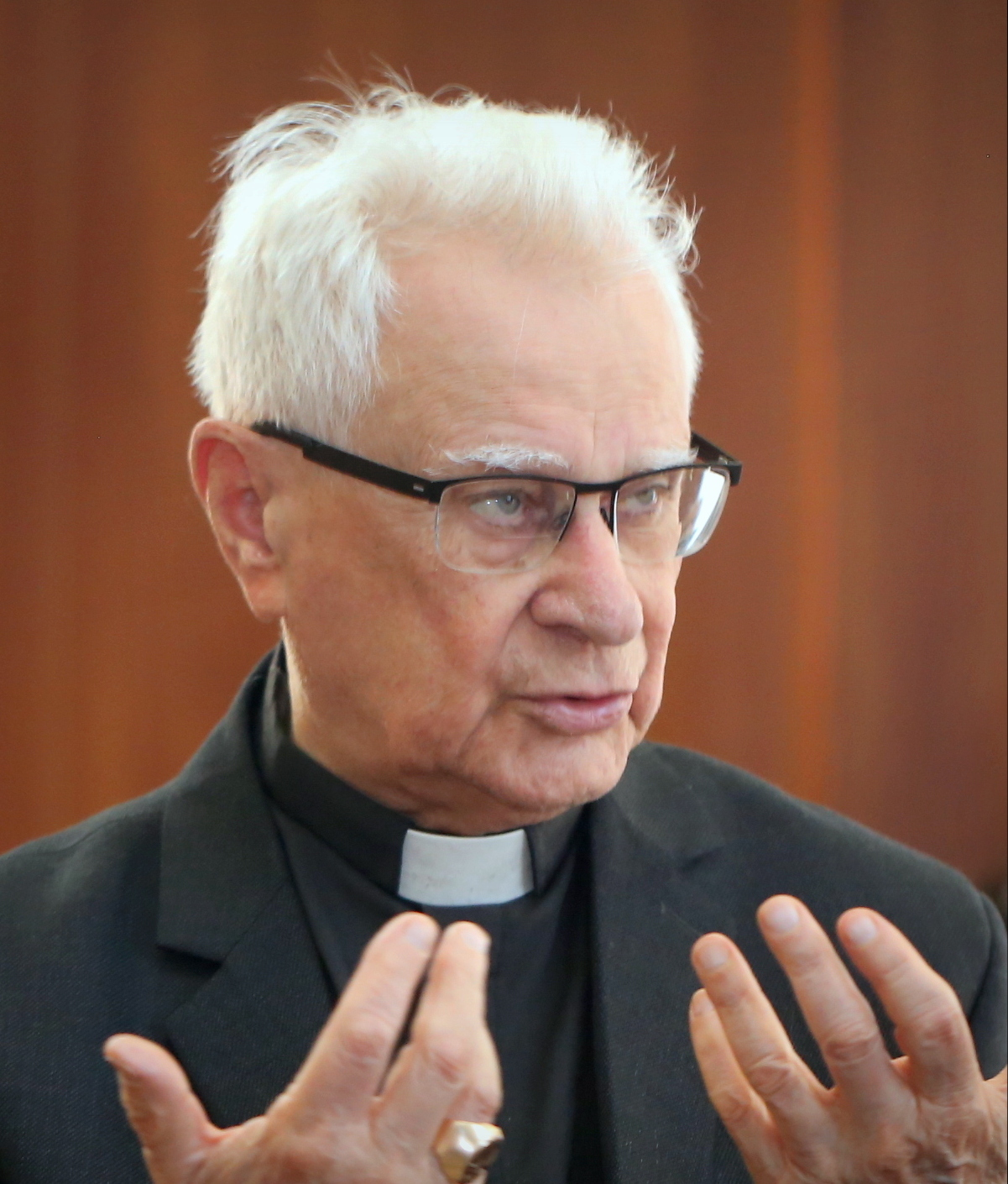
- Gyulay in 2018
- Archdiocese: Kalocsa–Kecskemét
- Diocese: Szeged–Csanád
- Appointed: 5 June 1987
- Term ended: 20 June 2006
- Predecessor: József Udvardy
- Successor: László Kiss-Rigó

Orders
- Ordination: 7 June 1953
- Consecration: 4 July 1987 by László Paskai

Personal details
- Born: 17 September 1930 Battonya, Hungary
- Died: 3 August 2024 (aged 93) Szeged, Hungary

Endre Gyulay (17 September 1930 – 3 August 2024) was a Hungarian Roman Catholic prelate. He served as the Bishop of the Roman Catholic Diocese of Szeged–Csanád from 1987 until 2006, which coincided with the end of communism in Hungary.

Gyulay was born on 17 September 1930, in Battonya, Hungary. He was ordained as a Catholic priest at Szeged Cathedral on 23 October 1951.

Gyulay died in Szeged on 3 August 2024, at the age of 93.

Catholic Church titles
Preceded by József Udvardy	Bishop of Szeged–Csanád; 1987–2006	Succeeded by László Kiss-Rigó
