= Diocese of Székesfehérvár =

Latin Catholic diocese in Hungary

Diocese of Székesfehérvár Dioecesis Albae Regalensis Székesfehérvári egyházmegye

Catholic
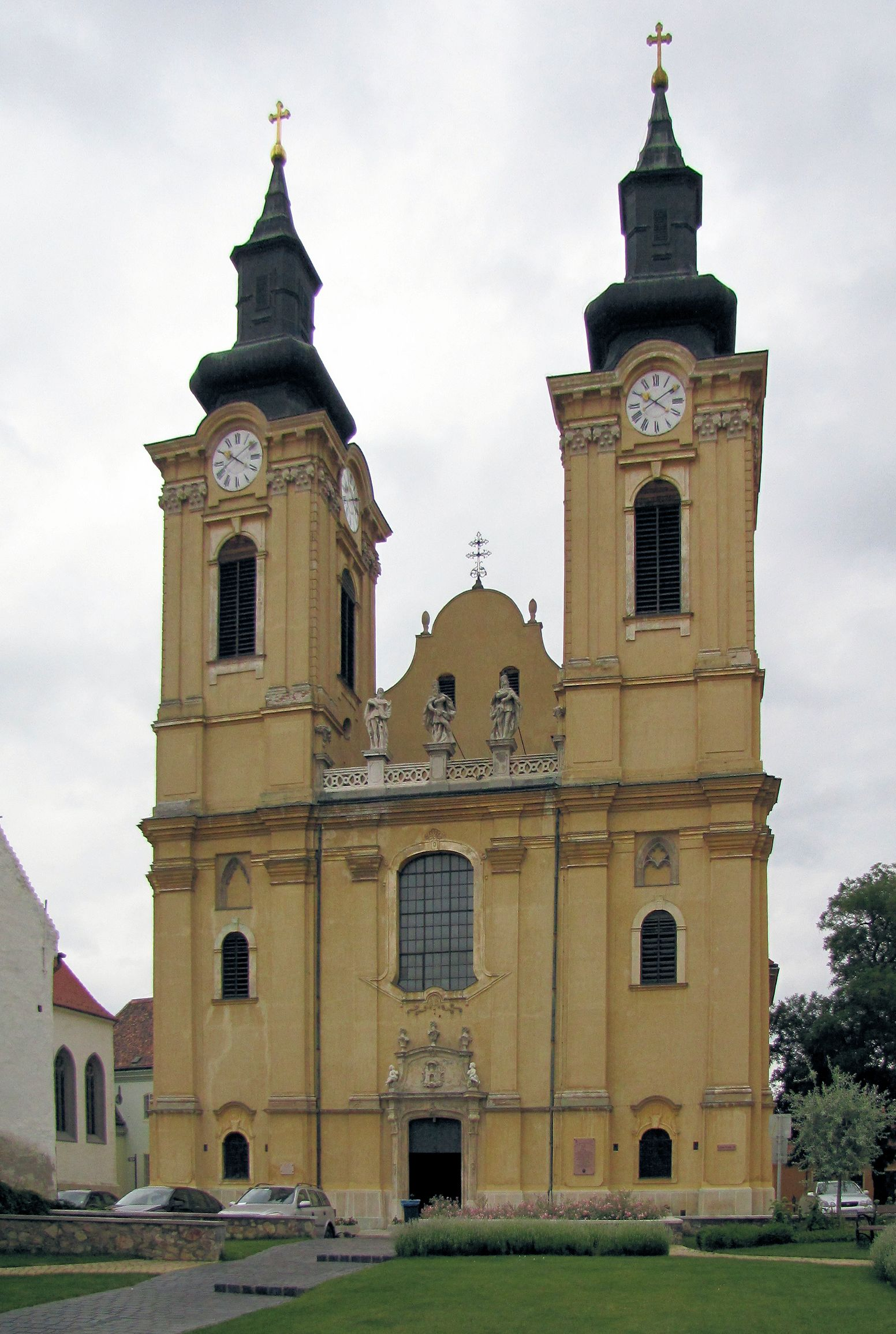
- Cathedral Basilica of St. Stephen the King

Location
- Country: Hungary
- Ecclesiastical province: Esztergom-Budapest
- Metropolitan: Esztergom-Budapest
- Headquarters: Székesfehérvár
- Coordinates: 47°11′30″N 18°24′35″E

Statistics
- Area: 5,170 km^{2} (2,000 sq mi)
- Population: Total; Catholics: (as of 2014); 825,000; 413,000 (50.1%)

Information
- Denomination: Catholic Church
- Sui iuris church: Latin Church
- Rite: Roman Rite
- Established: June 16, 1777
- Cathedral: Cathedral Basilica of St. Stephen the King

Current leadership
- Pope: Leo XIV
- Bishop: Antal Spányi

Map
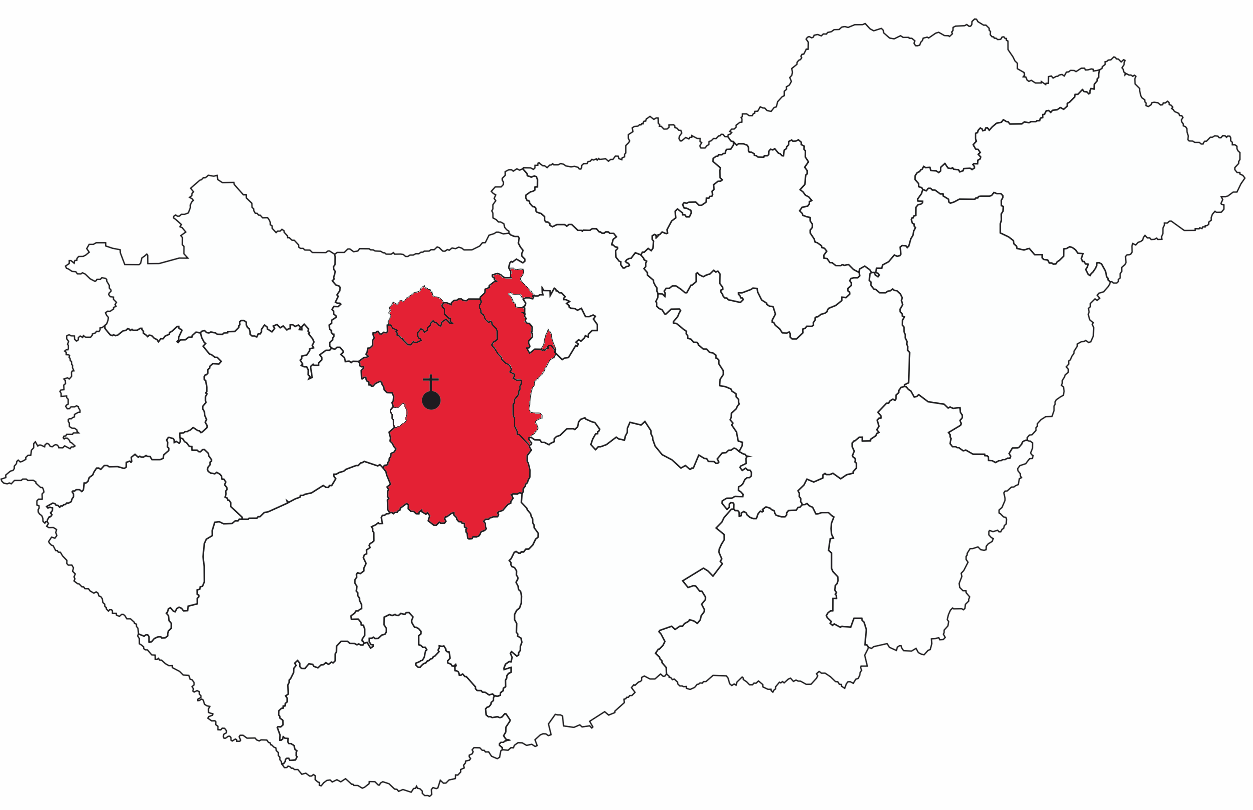
- Map of the Diocese

Website
- www.szfvar.katolikus.hu/english

The Diocese of Székesfehérvár (Latin: Dioecesis Albae Regalensis) is a Latin Church diocese of the Catholic Church located in the city of Székesfehérvár in the ecclesiastical province of Esztergom-Budapest in Hungary.

== History ==
- 16 June 1777: Established as Diocese of Székesfehérvár from the Diocese of Veszprém and Diocese of Győr by Queen Maria Theresa

== Special churches ==
- Basilica: Cathedral Basilica of St. Stephen the King, Székesfehérvár

== Leadership ==
- 2003– Antal Spányi (1950)
- 1991–2003 Jusztin Nándor Takács (1927–2016)
- 1982–1991 Gyula Szakos (1916–1992)
- 1968–1982 Imre Kisberk (1906–1982)
- 1927–1968 Lajos Shvoy (1879–1968)
- 1905–1927 Ottokár Prohászka (1858–1927)
- 1901–1905 Gyula Városy (1846–1910)
- 1890–1900 Fülöp Steiner (1830–1900)
- 1878–1889 János Pauer (1814–1889)
- 1875–1877 Nándor Dulánszky (1829–1896)
- 1867–1874 Vince Jekelfalussy (1802–1874)
- 1851–1866 Imre Farkas (1788–1866)
- 1848 Antal Karner (1794–1856)
- 1837–1847 László Barkóczy (1792–1847)
- 1830–1835 János Horváth (1769–1835)
- 1827–1830 Pál Mátyás Szusits (1767–1834)
- 1821–1825 József Kopácsy (1775–1847)
- 1816–1820 József Vurum (1763–1838)
- 1790–1811 Bertalan Miklós Milassin (1736–1811)
- 1777–1789 Ignác Nagy (1733–1789)

== See also ==
- Roman Catholicism in Hungary

== Sources ==
- GCatholic.org
- Catholic Hierarchy
