= Szombathely Cathedral =

Coordinates: 47.2313°N 16.6174°E

Our Lady of the Visitation Cathedral
- Sarlósboldogasszony székesegyházi
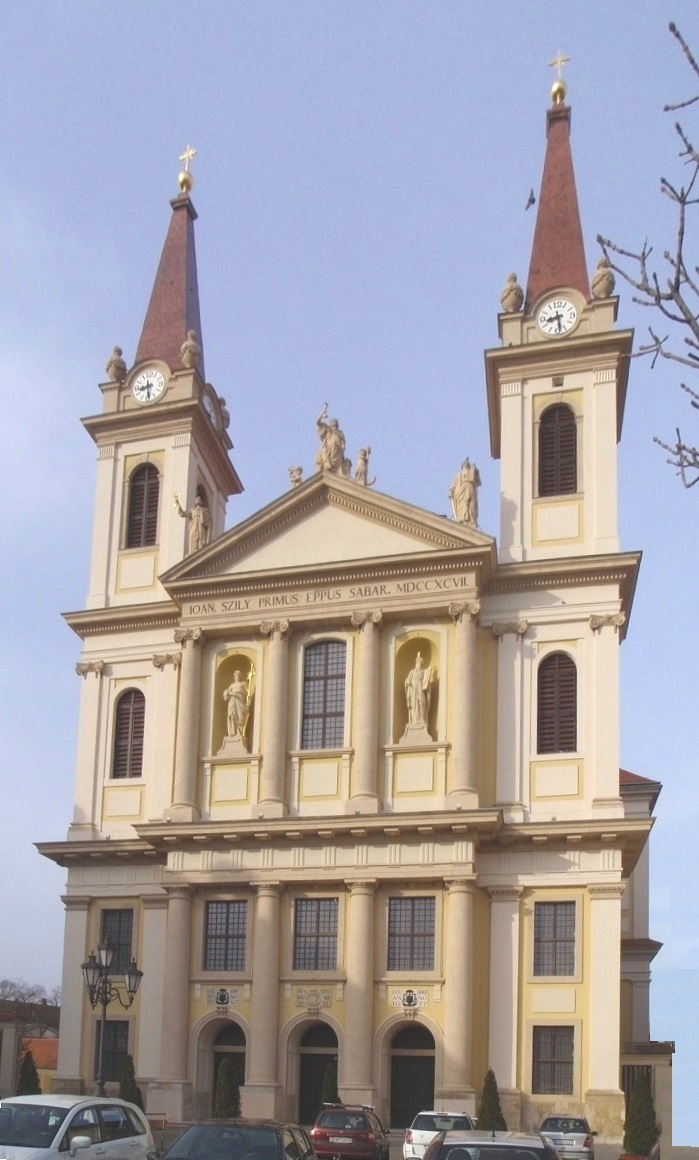
- Our Lady of the Visitation Cathedral
- Location: Szombathely
- Country: Hungary
- Denomination: Roman Catholic Church

The Our Lady of the Visitation Cathedral (Hungarian: Sarlósboldogasszony székesegyházi) also called Szombathely Cathedral or Cathedral of the Visitation of Our Lady is the name given to a religious building affiliated with the Catholic Church in the city of Szombathely in Hungary, it is the principal church of the Diocese of Szombathely.

With the establishment of a diocese in 1777 the construction of a cathedral became necessary. A Baroque building in classical style began in 1791 and was completed in 1797. However, the interior work continued until 1814. The Cathedral of the Visitation is located in the ancient forum of the Roman city of Savaria. The architect, Melchior Hefele, was responsible for the plans. Unfortunately, the ceiling frescoes attributed to Franz Anton Maulbertsch and his school did not survive the bombing during World War II.

== See also ==
- Roman Catholicism in Hungary
- List of cathedrals in Hungary
- Visitation

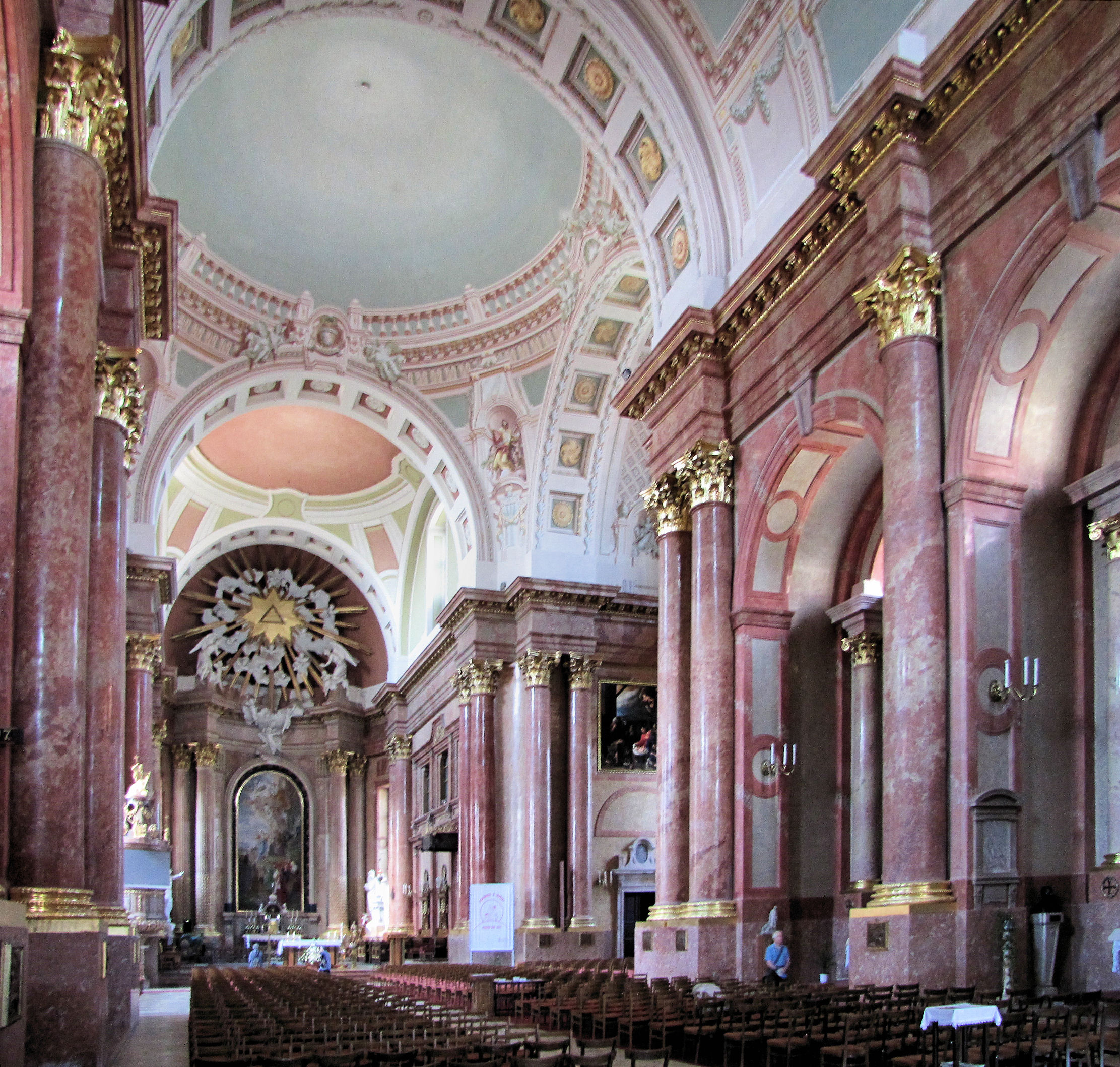
Internal view
