= Diocese of Szombathely =

Latin Catholic diocese in Hungary

Diocese of Szombathely Dioecesis Sabariensis Szombathelyi egyházmegye

Catholic
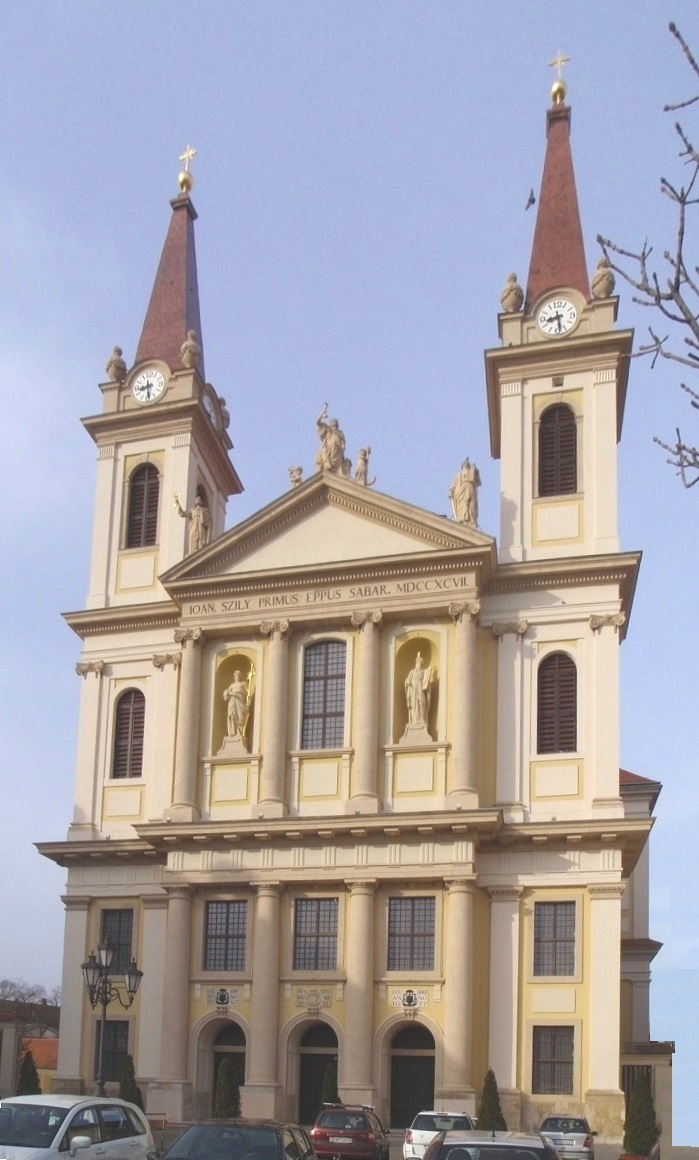
- Cathedral of the Visitation of Our Lady

Location
- Country: Hungary
- Ecclesiastical province: Veszprém
- Metropolitan: Veszprém
- Headquarters: Szombathely
- Coordinates: 47°13′51″N 16°37′06″E

Statistics
- Area: 4,660 km^{2} (1,800 sq mi)
- Population: Total; Catholics: (as of 2014); 387,500; 298,100 (76.9%)
- Parishes: 142

Information
- Denomination: Catholic Church
- Sui iuris church: Latin Church
- Rite: Roman Rite
- Established: June 17, 1777
- Cathedral: Szombathely Cathedral
- Patron saint: Martin of Tours

Current leadership
- Pope: Leo XIV
- Bishop: János Székely
- Metropolitan Archbishop: Gyula Márfi
- Auxiliary Bishops: Benedek Szabolcs Fekete
- Bishops emeritus: István Konkoly

Map
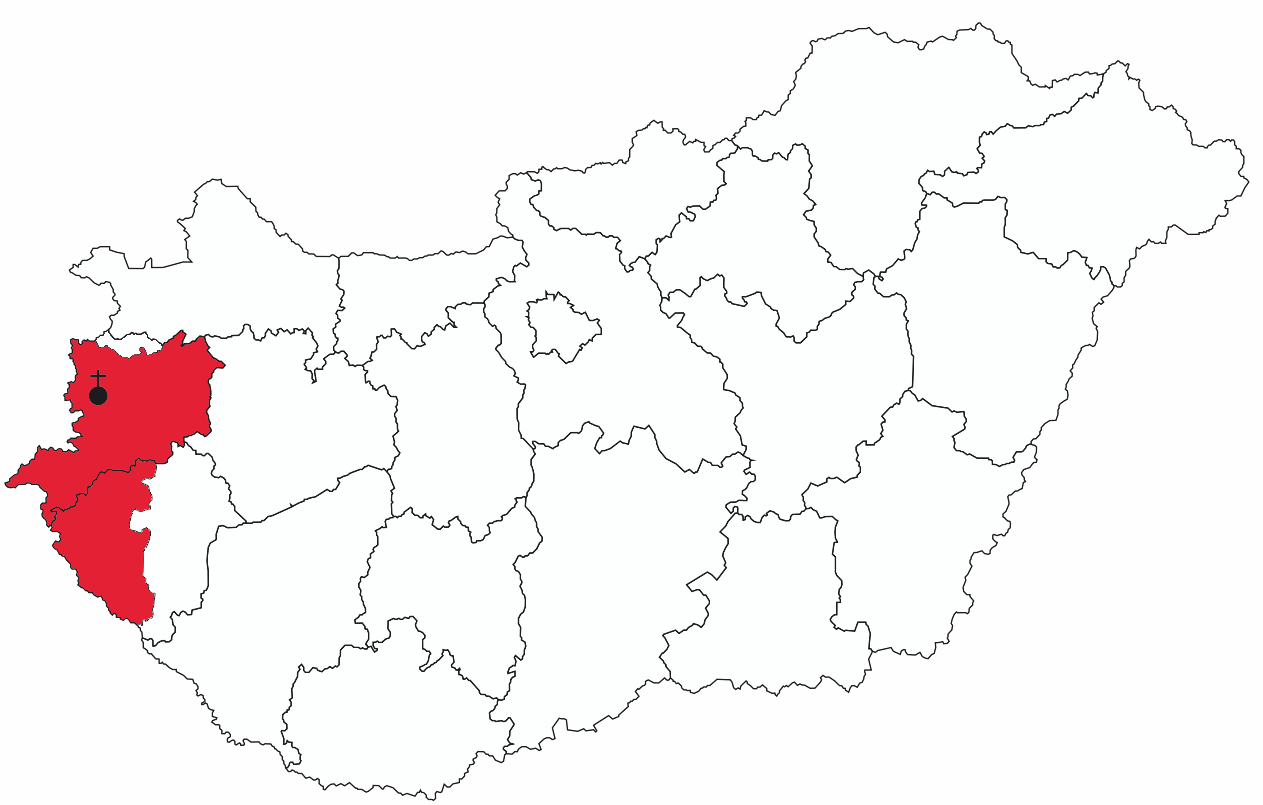
- Map of Diocese

Website
- www.martinus.hu

The Diocese of Szombathely (Latin: Dioecesis Sabariensis) is a Latin suffragan diocese in the ecclesiastical province of the Metropolitan Veszprém in Hungary.

Its cathedral episcopal see is Szombathely Cathedral (Hungarian: Sarlósboldogasszony székesegyházi), dedicated to the Visitation of Our Lady, in the city of Szombathely.

== History ==
- June 17, 1777: Established as Diocese of Szombathely (German Steinamanger), on territories split off from the Diocese of Veszprém (also Hungary) and then Diocese of Zagreb (Croatia). Its first bishop was John Szily (1777–1799), who built the episcopal residence and the cathedral. His successor, Cardinal Franz Herzen (1799–1804), was envoy of Austrian emperor Joseph II to the Holy See.
- Lost Alpine territory on 1922.05.18 to establish Apostolic Administration of Burgenland (in Austria).

== Statistics ==
As per 2014, it pastorally served 298,100 Catholics (76.9% of 387,500 total) on 4,660 km^{2} in 142 parishes with 135 priests (105 diocesan, 30 religious), 86 lay religious (30 brothers, 56 sisters) and 16 seminarians.

== Episcopal ordinaries ==
- János Szily di Felsőszopor (1777.02.17 – death 1799.01.02), previously Bishop of Knin (Croatia) (1775.04.24 – 1777.02.17)
- Cardinal Franziskus von Paula Herzan von Harras (Czech) (1800.05.12 – 1804.06.01), Cardinal-Priest of S. Croce in Gerusalemme (1788.04.07 – 1804.06.01); previously created Cardinal-Priest of S. Girolamo dei Croati (1780.12.11 – 1782.09.13), transferred Cardinal-Priest of Ss. Nereo ed Achilleo (1782.09.13 – 1788.04.07), Camerlengo of Sacred College of Cardinals (1788.03.10 – 1789)
- Leopold Perlaki Somogy (1806.08.26 – death 1822.02.20)
- András Bolle (1825.03.21 – death 1844)
- Gábor Balassa (1844.06.07 – death 1851.08.11)
- Ferenc Szenczy (1852.09.04 – death 1869.02.19)
- Enrico Szabó (1869.11.22 – death 1881)
- Cornelio Hidasy (1883.03.15 – death 1900)
- István Vilmos (1901.12.16 – 1910.12.24), succeeding as former Titular Bishop of Domitiopolis (1898.11.28 – 1901.12.16) and Auxiliary Bishop of Szombathely (1898.11.28 – 1901.12.16)
- Archbishop János Mikes (born Romania) (1911.12.11 – retired 1936.11.21); emeritate first as Titular Bishop of Acmonia (1936.01.10 – 1936.11.21), then Titular Bishop of Helenopolis in Palæstina (1936.11.21 – 1939.08.05), finally 'promoted' Titular Archbishop of Selymbria (1939.08.05 – 1945.03.28)
- József Grősz (1939.07.19 – 1943.05.07), previously Titular Bishop of Orthosias in Phœnicia (1928.12.17 – 1939.07.19) as Auxiliary Bishop of Győr (Hungary) (1928.12.17 – 1939.07.19); later Metropolitan Archbishop of Archdiocese of Kalocsa (Hungary) (1943.05.07 – death 1961.10.03)
- Sándor Kovács (1944.03.03 – death 1972)
  - Auxiliary Bishop: József Winkler (1959.09.15 – 1981.01.30)
  - Apostolic Administrator Árpád Fábián, Norbertines (O. Praem.) (1972.02.08 – 1975.01.07 see below)
- Árpád Fábián, O. Prae (see above 1975.01.07 – 1986.05.14)
  - Auxiliary Bishop: György Póka (1982.04.05 – 1987.03.03)
- István Konkoly (1987.06.05 – 2006.06.20)
- András Veres (2006.06.20 – 2016.07.17.)
  - Administrator of the Diocese István Császár (2016.07.18 – 2017.06.18)
- János Székely (2017.06.18 – ...), previously Titular Bishop of Febiana (2007.11.14 – 2017.06.18) as Auxiliary Bishop of Archdiocese of Esztergom–Budapest (Hungary) (2007.11.14 – 2017.06.18).

== See also ==
- Catholic Church in Hungary
- List of Catholic dioceses in Hungary

== Sources ==
- GCatholic.org, with Google map - data for all sections
- Catholic Hierarchy
