= András Veres =

Hungarian Catholic bishop (born 1959)

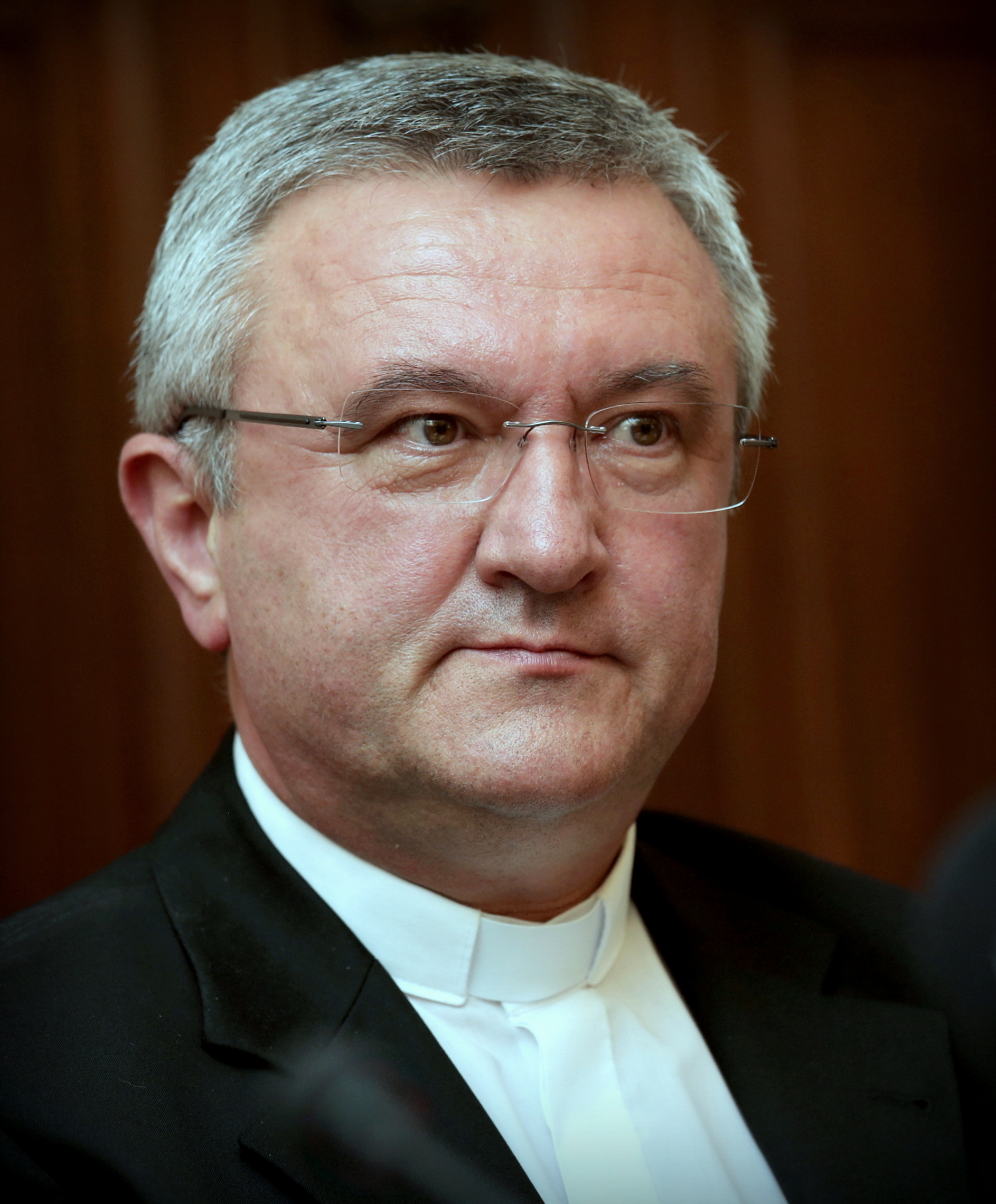
- Diocese: Roman Catholic Diocese of Győr

Orders
- Ordination: 2 August 1986
- Consecration: 6 January 2000

Personal details
- Born: 30 November 1959 (age 66) Nyírbátor, Hungary
- Denomination: Catholic
- Education: Pontifical Lateran University
- Motto: Adduxit eum ad Iesum
- Coat of arms

András Veres (born 30 November 1959) is a Hungarian prelate of the Catholic Church who has been bishop of Győr since 2016. He was bishop of Szombathely from 2006 to 2016 and before that an auxiliary bishop of Eger from 2000 to 2006.

== Biography ==
András Veres was born on 30 November 1959 in Nyírbátor. From 1974 to 1978 he studied at the Czuczor Gergely Benedictine High School in Győr. He was ordained a priest on 2 August 1986.

He earned a doctorate at the Theological Academy of Budapest in 1982 and took up pastoral work in the parish of Szécsény. In 1983 he transferred to the parish of St. Vincent de Paul in Budapest. From 1983 to 1985 he completed a licentiate in canon law at the Pontifical Lateran University while taking New Testament courses at the Pontifical Biblical Institute. From 1985 to 1987 he was assistant and then parish priest of St. Anna in Esztergom. In 1986 he became a professor at the Major Seminary of Esztergom and from 1998 to 2006 taught at the Faculty of Letters of Pázmány Péter Catholic University. As of 2006 he was director of the Supreme Council of Catholic Schools for the Archdiocese of Esztergom-Budapest. He was also secretary of the Hungarian Catholic Bishops Conference from 1998 to 2006.

On 5 November 1999, Pope John Paul II named him an auxiliary bishop of Eger. He received his episcopal consecration on 6 January 2000 in Saint Peter's Basilica from Pope John Paul.

On 20 June 2006, Pope Benedict XVI appointed him bishop of Szombathely.

He served as apostolic administrator of Pécs from January to April 2011.

On 17 May 2016, Pope Francis named him bishop of Győr. He was installed there on 16 July.

He is president of the Hungarian Catholic Bishops Conference, having been elected to a five-year term in 2015 and re-elected in 2020.
