= Stephen Kéki =

Hungarian bishop

- Bishop of Veszprém
- Seal of Stephen Kéki, 1319
- Installed: 1309
- Term ended: 1322 or 1323
- Predecessor: Benedict Rád
- Successor: Henry
- Other post: Provost of Veszprém

Personal details
- Died: 1322 or 1323
- Denomination: Roman Catholic
- Parents: Bedur

Stephen Kéki (Hungarian: Kéki István; died 1322 or 1323) was a Hungarian prelate in the early 14th century, who served as Bishop of Veszprém from 1309 until his death.

== Ancestry and early career ==
Stephen Kéki was born into a lower nobility, which possessed landholdings in Veszprém County. They residence located in the settlement Kék, in the area of present-day Balatonfüred. His father was a certain Bedur (or Beder). One of his brothers ("frater") was Peter, who served as castellan of the episcopal fort of Sümeg in the period between 1318 and 1320, when Stephen functioned as bishop. His another brother was Egyed (Aegidius), whose name is mentioned as a canon (1312) then guardian (1316–1318) of the cathedral chapter of Veszprém. Egyed bought vineyards in Peremarton (today a borough of Berhida) in 1304 and 1312.

According to several historians, including Vilmos Fraknói, Dezső Véghely, Albert Gárdonyi and György Bónis, Stephen and his family originated from the powerful gens (clan) Ákos, based on an 18th-century biographical writing (Vitae Vespremiensium praesulum) by theologian János Róka. Modern historiography adopted the claim frequently. Historian György Rácz proved that an erroneously transcribed copy (by archivist Ádám Rajcsányi) of an original charter of 1307 – in which the diet at Rákos confirmed Charles of Anjou's claim to the Hungarian throne – caused the error; Rajcsányi incorrectly resolved the abbreviation "plts" ("praelatus", instead of "palatinus"), while the original text refers to the influential secular baron Stephen Ákos.

There are further uncertainties regarding his possible university studies abroad. Alongside György Bónis, historians Péter Haraszti Szabó and Borbála Kelényi claimed that Stephen is identical with that "Stephanus de Stephano", who attended the University of Padua with the title of canon of Padua along with Gregory Bicskei and a certain Stephanus Catastani in February 1296. According to this reconstruction, Stephen Kéki obtained titles magister and decretorum doctor (i.e. doctor of canon law) by February 1302. Returning to Hungary, he became archdeacon of Gyulafehérvár (1297–1301), while serving as vice-chancellor of the royal court (1300–1304). Aladár Szabó and György Rácz refused this career outline, distinguishing three or four clerics named Stephen at the turn of the 13th and 14th centuries. Accordingly, Stephen Kéki never attended any foreign universities. Sometime in the second half of 1298, Stephen Kéki was elected provost of Veszprém replacing Andronicus, who swapped his position in order to become guardian of Székesfehérvár. Stephen held the dignity until 1309.

== Bishop of Veszprém ==
Following the death of Benedict Rád, which took place sometime after June 1309, Stephen was elected as Bishop of Veszprém in the second half of 1309. A truncated surviving charter of the cathedral chapter from that year already styles him as bishop-elect and provost. His election was confirmed sometime before October 1310, his first mention as bishop.

Stephen made an agreement with the cathedral chapter in 1313, during which he handed over to the canons half of the tax due to him from the peoples who had settled in Veszprém Castle for the purpose of defending the episcopal fort.

== Sources ==
- Engel, Pál (1988). "Az ország újraegyesítése. I. Károly küzdelmei az oligarchák ellen (1310–1323) [Reunification of the Realm. The Struggles of Charles I Against the Oligarchs (1310–1323)]". Századok (in Hungarian). 122 (1–2). Magyar Történelmi Társulat: 89–146. ISSN 0039-8098.
- Engel, Pál (1996). Magyarország világi archontológiája, 1301–1457, I. [Secular Archontology of Hungary, 1301–1457, Volume I] (in Hungarian). História, MTA Történettudományi Intézete. ISBN 963-8312-44-0.
- Gárdonyi, Albert (1915). "A magyar királyné udvari kancelláriája az Anjouk alatt [The Chancellery of the Hungarian Queens' Court under the Angevins]". Turul (in Hungarian). 33 (3–4): 64–84. ISSN 1216-7258.
- Gutheil, Jenő (1979). Az Árpád-kori Veszprém [Veszprém During the Age of Árpáds] (in Hungarian). Veszprém Megyei Levéltár. ISBN 9630111594.
- Haraszti Szabó, Péter; Kelényi, Borbála (2019). Magyarországi diákok francia, angol, itáliai és német egyetemeken a középkorban, 1100–1526 [Students from Hungary at the Universities of France, England, Italy and Germany in the Middle Ages 1100–1526] (in Hungarian). ELTE Egyetemi Könyvtár és Levéltár; MTA ELTE Egyetemtörténeti Kutatócsoport. ISBN 978-963-489-098-0.
- Karlinszky, Balázs (2014). "A veszprémi nagyprépostok archontológiája, 1079–1543 – Három prépost portréjával [Archontology of the Grand Provosts of Veszprém, 1079–1543 – With Portraits of Three Provosts]". Turul (in Hungarian). 87 (3). Magyar Heraldikai és Genealógiai Társaság: 93–103. ISSN 1216-7258.
- Kristó, Gyula (2003). "I. Károly király harcai a tartományurak ellen (1310–1323) [The Struggles of Charles I Against the Oligarchs (1310–1323)]". Századok (in Hungarian). 137 (2). Magyar Történelmi Társulat: 297–347. ISSN 0039-8098.
- Maléth, Ágnes (2020). A Magyar Királyság és a Szentszék kapcsolata I. Károly korában (1301–1342) [The Relationship of the Hungarian Kingdom and the Holy See in the time of Charles I (1301–1342)] (in Hungarian). Pécsi Tudományegyetem BTK TTI Középkori és Koraújkori Történeti Tanszék. ISBN 978-963-429-500-6.
- Rácz, György (2021). "Kéki István veszprémi püspökségének problémiái: származása, az örökös ispáni cím és a Csepel-szigeti tizedek kérdése [Problems of István Kéki's episcopate of Veszprém: his ancestry, the title of perpetual stewardship and the tithes of Csepel island]". In Karlinszky, Balázs; Varga, Tibor László (eds.). "Capella reginalis". A veszprémi püspökség a középkorban (A veszprémi egyházmegye múltjából 38.) (in Hungarian). Veszprémi Főegyházmegyei Levéltár. pp. 27–47. ISBN 978-615-81349-6-5.
- Varga, Béla (2009). Veszprém város lexikona [A Lexicon of the City of Veszprém] (in Hungarian). ISBN 978-963-06-7941-1.

Stephen House of Kéki Born: ? Died: 1322 or 1323
Catholic Church titles
Preceded by Andronicus	Provost of Veszprém; 1298–1309	Succeeded by Pousa Türje
Preceded by Benedict Rád	Bishop of Veszprém; 1309–1322	Succeeded by Henry
Political offices
Preceded by Paul	Chancellor of the Queen; 1310–1322	Succeeded by Henry
Preceded by Lőrinte Lőrinte (?)	Ispán of Veszprém; 1313–1322	Succeeded by Martin Acsai
