= György Udvardy =

Hungarian prelate (born 1960)

His Excellency György Udvardy
- Archbishop of Veszprém
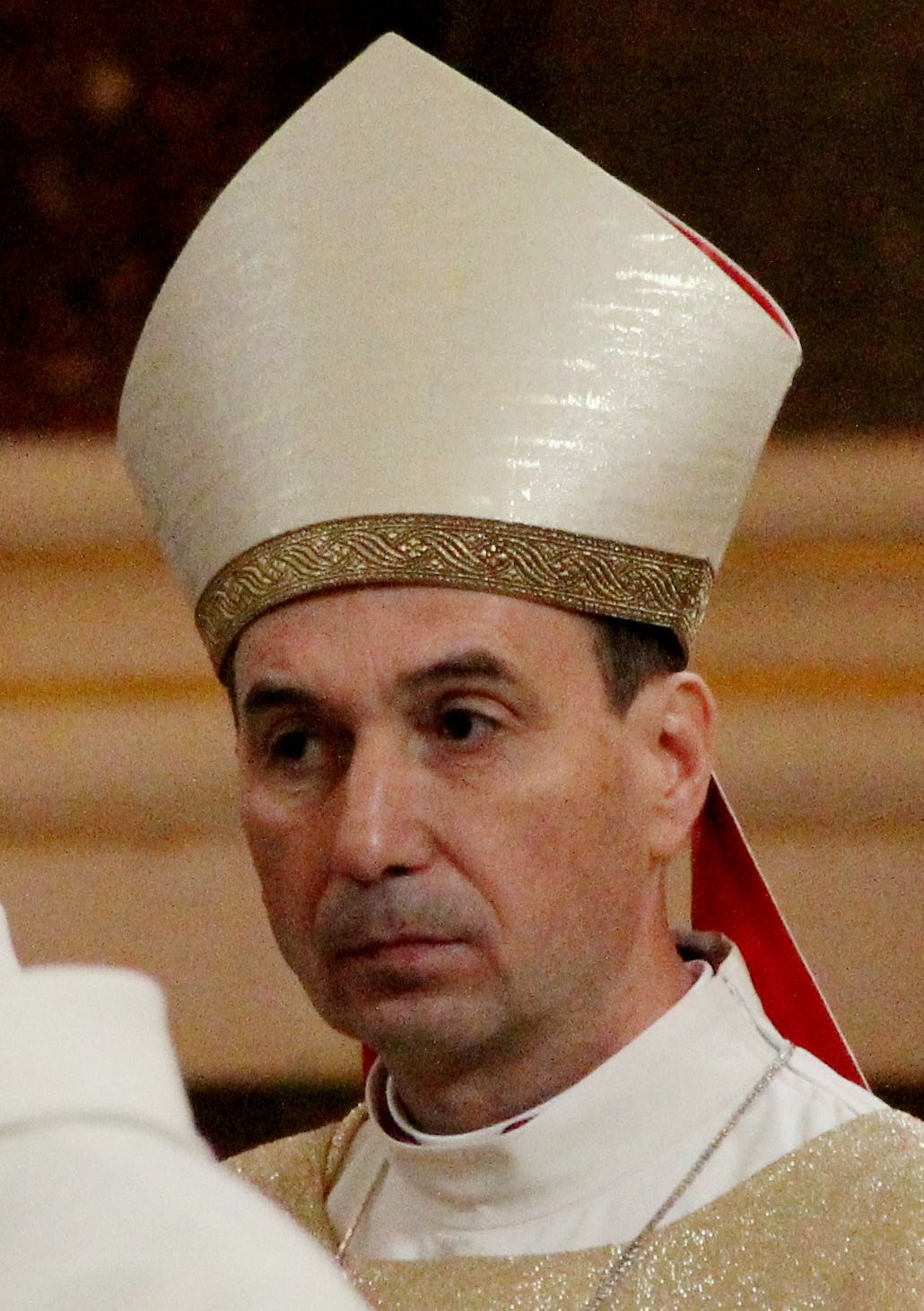
- Church: Roman Catholic Church
- Archdiocese: Veszprém
- See: Veszprém
- Appointed: 12 July 2019
- Installed: 31 August 2019
- Predecessor: Gyula Márfi
- Other post: Vice-President of the Hungarian Episcopal Conference (2015-)
- Previous posts: Titular Bishop of Marazanae (2004-11); Auxiliary Bishop of Esztergom-Budapest (2004-11); Bishop of Pécs (2011-19)

Orders
- Ordination: 15 June 1985 by László Lékai
- Consecration: 21 February 2004 by Péter Erdő

Personal details
- Born: György Udvardy; 14 May 1960 (age 66) Balassagyarmat, Hungary
- Motto: Jézus Krisztus az úr
- Coat of arms

György Udvardy (born 14 May 1960) is a Hungarian prelate, who was appointed Archbishop of Veszprém by Pope Francis on 12 July 2019. He has been a bishop since 2004.

Pope John Paul II named him auxiliary bishop of Esztergom-Budapest on 24 January 2004.

Pope Benedict XVI appointed him Bishop of Pécs on 9 April 2011.

A controversial decision of his as Archbishop of Veszprém is the renovation of his cathedral, the St. Michael's in 2022. All frescoes, the painted glass windows, the marble floor and the Gothic Revival altar were removed, and the cathedral was renovated in a much more Puritanistic style. The frescoes were painted by renowned artist Antal Szirmai in 1910, when the cathedral was renovated in a Romanesque and Gothic Revival style after the old Baroque frescoes had been decayed beyond repair. The painted glass windows were made by another renowned artist, Lili Sztehlo Árkay, after the previous, Gothic Revival windows, painted by Gida Waltherr, were destroyed during WWII. Both the frescoes and the windows were deemed artistically significant. Many residents of the city protested their removal (including retired archbishop Gyula Márfi), over 3000 signatures were collected in a petition, and an appeal was made to Pope Francis himself, but without success. The current archbishop resisted, and even called his predecessor to leave the city. The only successful result of the protests was that new painted glass windows (based on Waltherr's originals) were ordered instead of the plain ones of the original renovation plan. Sztehlo's windows will be restored and exhibited in a museum.

Catholic Church titles
| Preceded by Mihály Mayer | Bishop of Pécs; 2011–2019 | Succeeded by László Felföldi |
| Preceded by Gyula Márfi | Archbishop of Veszprém; 2019– | Succeeded by Incumbent |
