= Péter Erdő =

Hungarian Catholic cardinal (born 1952)

His Eminence Péter Erdő
- Cardinal; Archbishop of Esztergom-Budapest; Primate of Hungary
- Official portrait
- Province: Esztergom-Budapest
- See: Esztergom-Budapest
- Appointed: 7 December 2002
- Installed: 11 January 2003
- Predecessor: László Paskai, O.F.M.
- Other post: Cardinal-Priest of S. Maria Nuova
- Previous posts: Titular Bishop of Puppi (1999–2002); Auxiliary Bishop of Székesfehérvár (1999–2002); Cardinal-Priest of Santa Balbina (2003–2023)

Orders
- Ordination: 18 June 1975 by László Lékai
- Consecration: 5 November 1999 by Pope John Paul II
- Created cardinal: 21 October 2003 by Pope John Paul II
- Rank: Cardinal-Priest

Personal details
- Born: Péter Erdő; 25 June 1952 (age 74) Budapest, Hungary
- Denomination: Catholicism
- Residence: Primate's Palace, Budapest; Primate's Palace, Esztergom
- Education: Roman Catholic Central Theological Academy (Licentiate, PhD); Pontifical Lateran University (PhD)
- Motto: Initio non erat nisi gratia (In the beginning there was nothing but grace)
- Coat of arms

Péter Erdő (Note: Hungarian pronunciation: [ˈpeːtɛr ˈɛrdøː]) (born 25 June 1952) is a Hungarian cardinal of the Catholic Church who has served as the Archbishop of Esztergom-Budapest and Primate of Hungary since 2003. He was president of the Council of the Bishops' Conferences of Europe from 2006 to 2016. He was the relator general for the Third Extraordinary General Assembly of the Synod of Bishops in Rome.

Erdő was seen as a leading candidate in the 2025 papal conclave. He gained significant support and was the favored choice of conservative Catholic networks in the United States and Hungarian Prime Minister Viktor Orbán, and has enjoyed good relations with the Orthodox churches and the Russian government. He was reportedly the leading choice among the top three contenders on the first ballot, all of whom won between 20 and 30 votes, but his support faded away in subsequent rounds behind Cardinal Pietro Parolin and the eventual winner, Cardinal Robert Prevost, who would be elected Pope Leo XIV on the fourth ballot.

== Biography ==
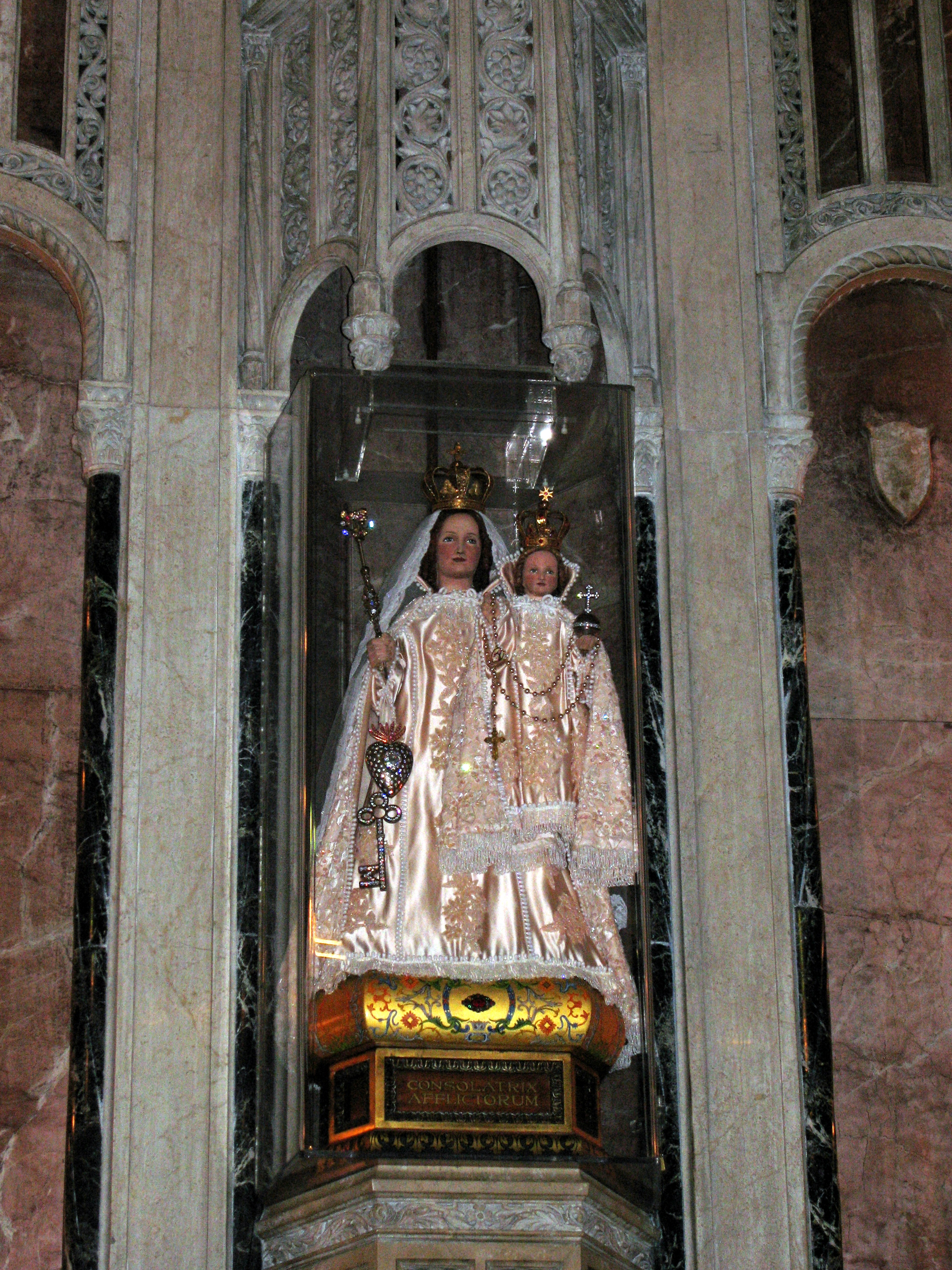
An image of Our Lady of Consolation holding the Child Jesus

Erdő was born in Budapest on 25 June 1952, the first of the six children of Sándor and Mária (née Kiss) Erdő. He studied at the seminaries of Esztergom and Budapest, and the Pontifical Lateran University in Rome (where he attained doctorates in both theology and canon law) with a doctoral dissertation on the philosophical and theological foundations of canon law in the writings of Nicholas of Cusa. On 18 June 1975, Erdő was ordained to the priesthood by Archbishop László Lékai, and was incardinated in the Archdiocese of Esztergom. He worked as parochial vicar in Dorog, and then continued his studies in Rome from 1977 to 1980. For the next eight years, he taught as a professor of theology and canon law at the Seminary of Esztergom, and held guest lectures at several foreign universities. Erdő served in the Hungarian Episcopal Conference as Secretary of the Commission of Canon Law in 1986, and later as its president in 1999. In 1988, he began teaching theology at the Pázmány Péter Catholic University, serving as rector from 1998 to 2003. Since 2005 he has been the Great Chancellor of the university.

On 5 November 1999, he was appointed an auxiliary bishop of Székesfehérvár and titular bishop of Puppi. He received his episcopal consecration on 6 January 2000 from Pope John Paul II with Archbishops Giovanni Battista Re and Marcello Zago, OMI, acting as co-consecrators. Erdő was named Archbishop of Esztergom-Budapest on 7 December 2002, a post which carries with it the title of Primate of Hungary. Erdő became a corresponding member of the Hungarian Academy of Sciences in 2007 and a full member in 2013. In 2011, he was awarded an honorary doctorate by the University of Navarra (Spain).

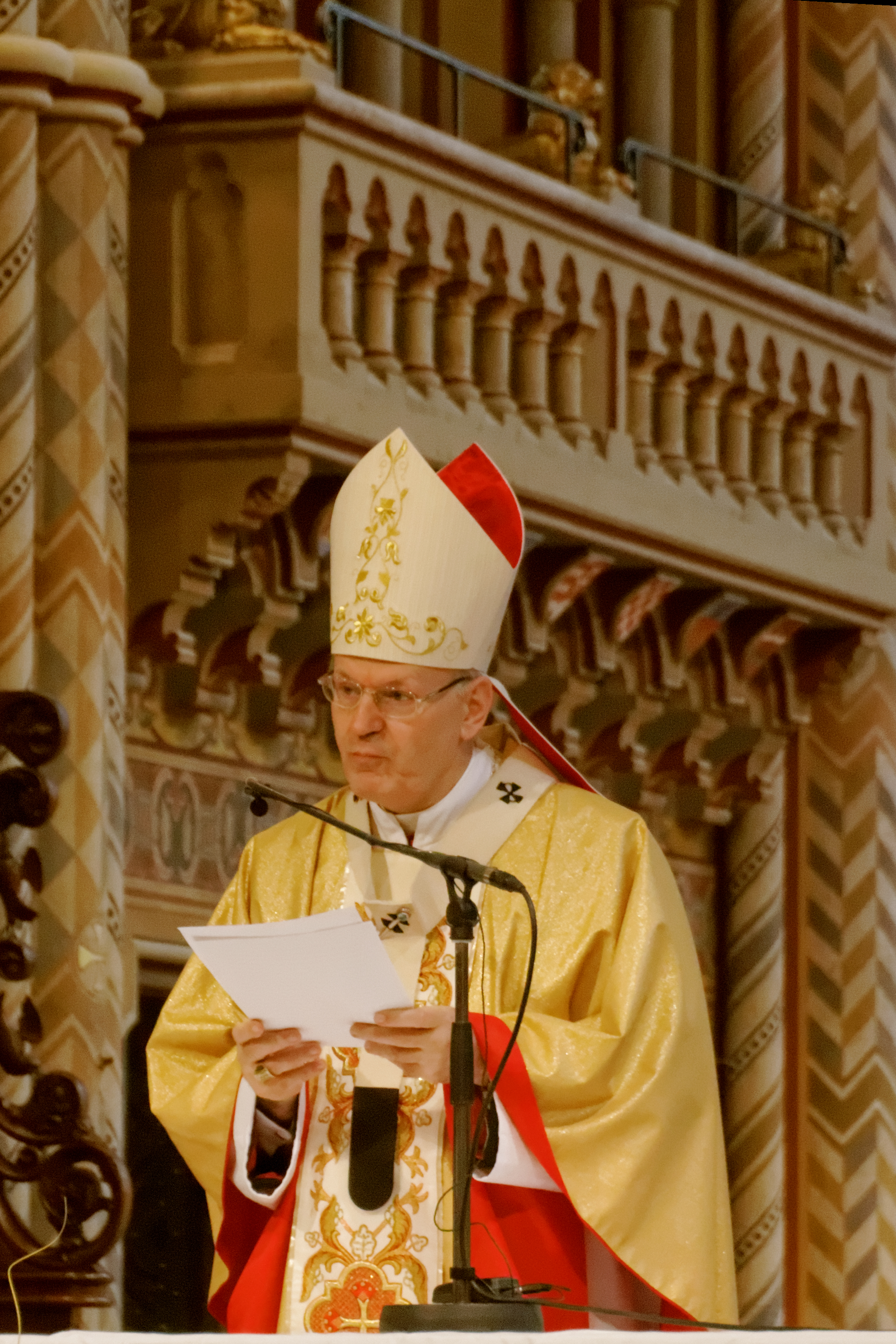
Erdő in 2013

== Cardinal ==
He was created Cardinal-Priest of Santa Balbina by John Paul II in the consistory of 21 October 2003. He was the youngest member of the Sacred College until the appointment of Reinhard Marx in 2010.

Erdő was elected to a five-year term as president of the Hungarian Episcopal Conference in September 2005 and to a five-year term as president of the Council of Episcopal Conferences of Europe in October 2006. On 17 January 2009 he was appointed a member of the Pontifical Council for Culture by Pope Benedict XVI, and on 29 January 2011 of the Secretariat of State (Second Section).

Erdő sponsored the Thirteenth International Congress of Medieval Canon Law in Esztergom, 3–9 August 2008. On 19 October 2011, the apostolic nunciature in Peru announced that he would undertake an apostolic visitation to intervene in the dispute between the Pontifical Catholic University of Peru and Juan Luis Cipriani Thorne, Archbishop of Lima.

On 18 September 2012, Erdő was appointed by Pope Benedict XVI to be one of the Synod Fathers for the upcoming October 2012 Ordinary General Assembly of the Synod of Bishops on the New Evangelization.

On 14 October 2013, Erdő was named by Pope Francis to serve as the Relator General of the Third Extraordinary General Assembly of the Synod of Bishops, which took place from 5 to 19 October 2014. The chosen theme is "The challenges of the family in the context of evangelization". He resumed his appointment as Relator General when the Synod reconvened in October 2015. In the 2015 book The Rigging of a Synod?, Vatican correspondent Edward Pentin claimed that Cardinal Lorenzo Baldisseri had pressured Erdő to soften the wording of his 2014 address to the Synod. In 2015, Erdő's second address to the synod was described by journalists, such as Damian Thompson of The Spectator and John L. Allen Jr. of the Boston Globe, as more theologically conservative in its tone. During this speech he decried how, "the current tendency to pass off those things which are simply desires, often selfish ones, as true and proper rights, while denying the basic objective of all law, must be avoided".

Erdő participated as a cardinal elector in the 2005 and 2013 papal conclaves, which elected Popes Benedict XVI and Francis, respectively. He had been mentioned as early as 2022 as a potential candidate in the 2025 conclave, in which he again participated as an elector; that conclave ultimately elected Pope Leo XIV.

In March 2023, his titular church was changed to Santa Maria Nuova after his previous titular church, Santa Balbina, was closed because of structural deterioration.

Erdő is the Grand Prior of the Hungarian Lieutenancy of the Equestrian Order of the Holy Sepulchre of Jerusalem.

In May 2026, Erdő suffered a stroke.

== Views ==
Although Erdo sometimes criticized the Hungarian government's policies—notably the nationalisation of Hungary's IVF clinics and compulsory religious education—he avoided criticizing the government over other issues when it was at odds with the Catholic Church leadership.

=== Cardinal Mindszenty ===
Erdő requested that the Hungarian Chief Prosecutor's Office legally, morally, and politically rehabilitate Cardinal József Mindszenty, his predecessor, who fought Hungary's Communist regime and was arrested by the country's Stalinist dictatorship, after which he sought refuge in the American embassy in Budapest. The Chief Prosecutor's Office ultimately rehabilitated Mindszenty in 2012 thanks to Erdő's intervention. In 2006, he sent a letter of gratitude to U.S. President George W. Bush on the 50th anniversary of Cardinal Mindszenty's forced arrest because of the political support that Americans had given to Mindszenty at the time.

=== Divorced and remarried Catholics ===
During a Vatican press conference in October 2014, Erdő expressed opposition to the idea of allowing divorced and remarried Catholics to receive Holy Communion.

=== Migrants ===
During the 2015 European migrant crisis, Erdő said that taking in refugees would amount to human trafficking.

After Pope Francis gave a clear direction, he changed his views: "We are ready and happy to follow your call to welcome and assist refugees. His words are a great encouragement and support for the work we have started. We thank you for leading us on the way of the Gospel and for pointing us in the right direction."

Later, in front of members of the Orban government, he said: "I see efforts to turn religions against each other. There are many similarities between Christianity and Islam. Much more than we think. Diversity is good. It is good for plants and it is good for humans. And Hungary has long been an inclusive community."

=== Romani people ===
Erdő has written about the special socio-economic conditions of the Romani people and has openly wondered about the correct way to evangelize them.

=== Church in Hungary ===
Erdő has focused on Hungary's need to restore its faith and hope, while celebrating Midnight Mass at St. Stephen's Basilica in Budapest, to mark the Christmas holiday. He has signaled some disagreement with the Orban government on other issues, supporting the separation of church and state.

=== Canon Law ===
In his 1989 monograph, Ministerium, munus et officium in Codice Iuris canonici, he argued that the three Latin terms, ministerium, munus and officium, had distinct meanings in the Code of Canon Law promulgated by Pope John Paul II in 1983.

== 2025 conclave ==
Erdő gained significant support and was the favored choice of conservative politicians and networks. He was generally considered to be predominantly supported by conservative commentators and theological traditionalists in the United States, Hungarian Prime Minister Viktor Orban and additionally enjoyed positive relations with the Eastern Orthodox Church and the Russian government.

== See also ==
- Tamás Bakócz, another Hungarian serious candidate in the 1513 papal conclave

Catholic Church titles
Preceded by André Nguyễn Văn Nam	— TITULAR — Titular Bishop of Puppi; 5 November 1999 – 7 December 2002	Succeeded by John Hsane Hgyi
Preceded by László Paskai	Archbishop of Esztergom-Budapest; 7 December 2002 –	Incumbent
Preceded by Léon-Étienne Duval	Cardinal-Priest of Santa Balbina; 21 October 2003 – 29 March 2023	Vacant
Preceded by Angelo Sodano	Cardinal-Priest of Santa Maria Nova; 29 March 2023 –	Incumbent
