= Hanna Sulner =

Hanna Sulner, née Fischof (1917–1999) was a Hungarian document analyst and handwriting expert.

== Life ==
Hanna Fischof was born in Budapest on 17 February 1917, the daughter of Professor Julius Fischof, a handwriting analyst. From the age of sixteen she studied handwriting analysis with her father. She later studied criminology, and gained a qualification to teach document examination at the University of Budapest law school.

In 1944 she took over her father's work as a handwriting analyst. In 1947 she married Laszlo Sulner, a handwriting analyst. The couple, initially unwittingly, were drawn into the Communist government plot to frame Cardinal József Mindszenty, and forced to forge documents in Mindszenty's hand. On February 5, 1949 they managed to escape Hungary to Austria. From Vienna they denounced Mindszenty's trial, exhibiting microfilm of the documents they had fabricated. In 1950 Laszlo Sulner died in Paris, aged 30. Though he officially died of heart disease, Hanna Sulner believed him to have been poisoned.

Sulner moved with her young son to New York City. She continued her work, testifying at over 1,000 cases throughout the United States. She died at her home in Manhattan on January 5, 1999.

== Works ==
- Disputed documents: new methods for examining questioned documents. Dobbs Ferry, N.Y., Oceana Publications, 1966.
