= John I Garai =

Hungarian prelate

John Garai
- Bishop of Veszprém
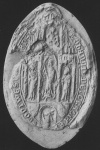
- Seal of John Garai, 1346
- Installed: 1346
- Term ended: 1357
- Predecessor: Galhard de Carceribus ^{(designate)}
- Successor: Ladislaus Zsámboki

Personal details
- Died: late 1357 or early 1358
- Buried: St. Michael's Cathedral, Veszprém
- Denomination: Roman Catholic
- Parents: Paul I Garai; Kós Nekcsei

John I Garai (Hungarian: Garai (I.) János; died late 1357 or early 1358) was a Hungarian prelate in the 14th century, who served as Bishop of Veszprém from 1346 until his death.

== Early life ==
John was born in the early 14th century into the Bánfi branch of the powerful Garai family, as the son of Paul I Garai, a renowned military leader during the reign of Charles I of Hungary, and Kós Nekcsei, daughter of treasurer Demetrius Nekcsei. He had two brothers – ispáns Stephen I and Paul III – and two sisters, Helena, who married John Alsáni, Ban of Macsó, and an unidentified one, wife of Egyed Bakócai. Paul I actively participated in the unification war against the oligarchs, thus received large-scale land donations from the king, and elevated into the upper nobility.

Contradicting earlier historiographical reviews, his biographer Tünde Árvai demonstrated that Garai is not identical with that John, who was provost of Szepes (today Spišská Kapitula in Spišské Podhradie, Slovakia) from 1322 until c. 1348. Garai was first mentioned by contemporary records in February 1344, when his friend Nicholas Vásári requested Pope Clement VI to grant the right to hear of confession to his "innermost friend" John Garai, who then served as minor provost of the collegiate chapter of John the Baptist Church in Pécs. The papal document also notes that Garai had a degree of canon law by then. It is plausible that he attended an Italian universitas, most possibly the University of Bologna, similarly to his nephew Bálint Alsáni. Simultaneously his minor provostship, he was also a canon of the cathedral chapter of Esztergom. He held both dignities until 1353.

== Prelate ==
Garai was made head of the royal chapel and secret chancellor in the court of Louis I of Hungary by May 1346. In this capacity, he was a member of that Hungarian delegation, which was sent to Avignon during the Neapolitan crisis. There, with the support of Louis I, Garai was appointed Bishop of Veszprém on 19 July 1346 in order to fill the diocese, as the appointment of Galhard de Carceribus was rejected by the monarch for a year. Nevertheless, domestic royal charters referred to the bishopric as vacant throughout 1346, because of the slow spread of information and Garai's extended stay at the papal court. Beside the dignity, Garai also became chancellor for Queen Margaret, according to the tradition. It was difficult for him to pay the so-called servitium commune, one-off tax on his appointment, making up a third of the annual revenues of the See, therefore he asked for a reduction in the amount. In order to keep his benefice (Pécs and Esztergom), he delayed continuously the consecration as bishop. This occurred sometimes in the period between 1 August 1351 and 19 January 1352.

When Louis sent small expeditions one after one to Italy at the beginning of his war against Joanna I of Naples, Nicholas Kont and John Garai jointly commanded an army, which seized L'Aquila in May 1347, after a negotiation with Obizzo III d'Este, Marquis of Ferrara. Returning home for a brief time, Garai joined the Hungarian royal army, which entered the Kingdom of Naples on 24 December near L'Aquila, which had yielded to Louis. There he received a steed as a gift from Marquis Obizzo. In December, he assured the envoys of Florence at Rimini that his lord Louis I will continue "the benevolent policy of his predecessors". When the arrival of the Black Death forced Louis to leave Italy in May 1348, Garai also returned to Hungary. Garai was again sent to Italy in late 1348, belonging to a small unit under the command of Stephen Lackfi. Because of its danger, Garai compiled his last will and testament in October 1348. After some successes, a mutiny among his German mercenaries forced Lackfi to return to Hungary in the autumn of 1349. It is plausible that Garai again served in the royal army, when Louis departed for his second Neapolitan campaign in April 1350. John Garai and Ulrich von Wolfurt attended peace negotiations with the representatives of the Kingdom of Naples at Avignon in the autumn of 1351. In accordance with their compromise, Louis withdrew all his troops from Naples. Returning Hungary, Pope Clement entrusted Garai to absolve the Hungarian subordinates involved in the campaign from the papal excommunication.

Garai was last mentioned as a living person on 29 October 1357. According to an inventory of the cathedral chapter of Veszprém, he was buried in the St. Michael's Cathedral. Ladislaus Zsámboki was elected as his successor by January 1358, and Pope Innocent VI confirmed his election in March 1358.

== Sources ==
- Árvai, Tünde (2012). "A "sohasem volt" szepesi prépost Garai János veszprémi püspök pályafutása [János Garai's Biography, the wrong-called Provost of Szepes]". In Bagi, Dániel; Fedeles, Tamás; Kiss, Gergely (eds.). "Köztes-Európa vonzásában". Ünnepi tanulmányok Font Márta tiszteletére (in Hungarian). Kronosz Kiadó. pp. 33–43. ISBN 978-615-5181-69-6.
- Engel, Pál (1996). Magyarország világi archontológiája, 1301–1457, I. [Secular Archontology of Hungary, 1301–1457, Volume I] (in Hungarian). História, MTA Történettudományi Intézete. ISBN 963-8312-44-0.

John I House of Garai Born: ? Died: 1357
Political offices
Preceded by Nicholas Neszmélyi	Head of the royal chapel 1346–1348	Succeeded by Nicholas Apáti
Catholic Church titles
Preceded by Galhard de Carceribus designate	Bishop of Veszprém; 1346–1357	Succeeded by Ladislaus Zsámboki
