= Udvardy =

Udvardy (Hungarian pronunciation: [ˈudvɒrdi]) is a Hungarian surname. Notable people with the surname include:

- Anna Udvardy (1949–2019), Hungarian film producer and production manager
- Ferdinand Udvardy (1895 – post 1945), Hungarian aviator
- György Udvardy (born 1960), Hungarian prelate
- Miklos Udvardy (1919–1998), Hungarian biologist and biogeographer
- Panna Udvardy (born 1998), Hungarian tennis player
