= Gyula Márfi =

Hungarian prelate of the Catholic Church (born 1943)

His Excellency Gyula Márfi
- Archbishop of Veszprém
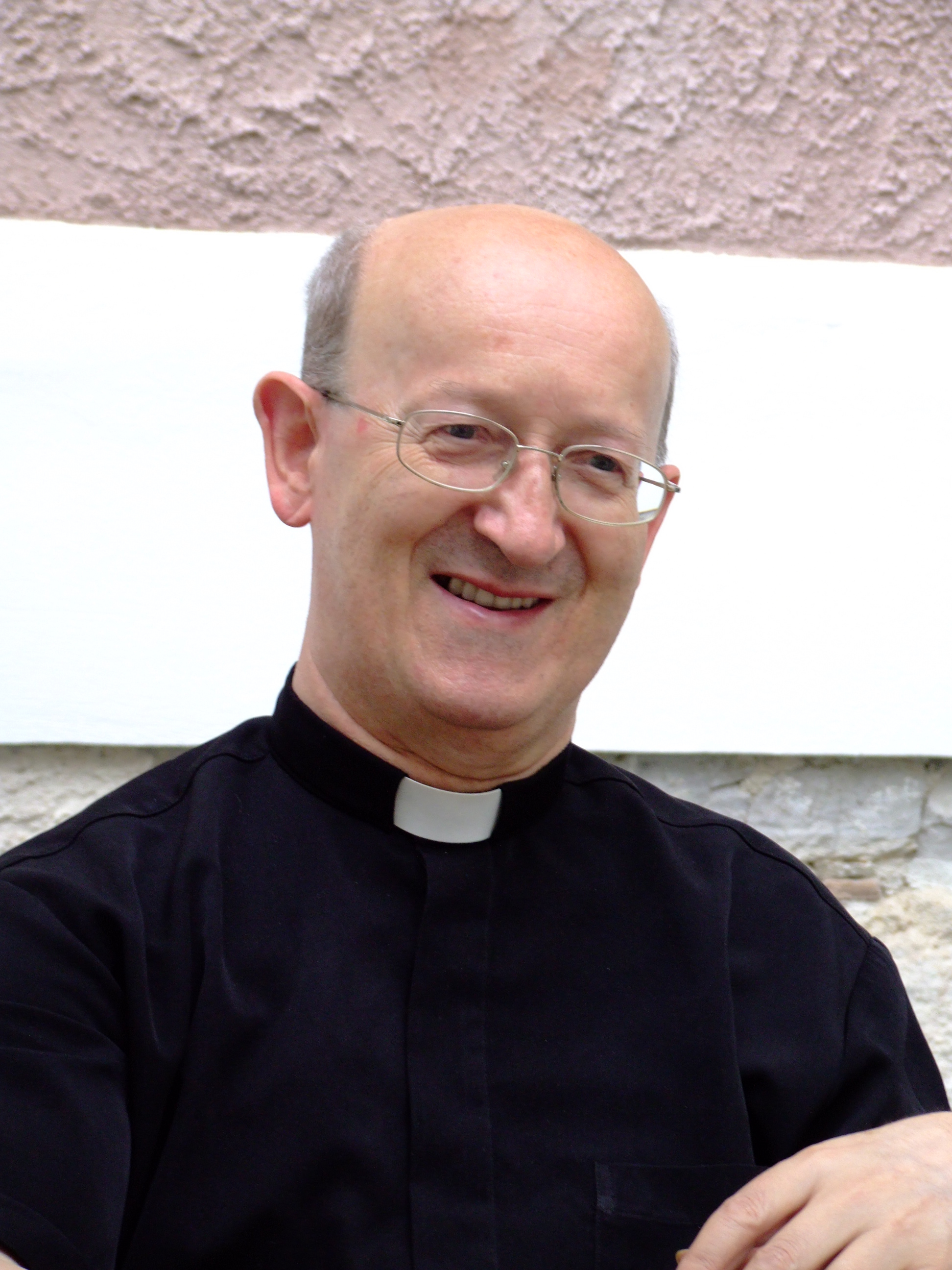
- Church: Roman Catholic Church
- See: Archdiocese of Veszprém
- In office: 14 August 1997 -
- Predecessor: József Szendi

Orders
- Ordination: 18 June 1967

Personal details
- Born: 17 December 1943 (age 82) Pördefölde Hungary
- Coat of arms

Gyula Márfi (born 17 December 1943) is a Hungarian prelate of the Catholic Church.

Pope John Paul II named him Archbishop of Veszprém in 1997.

Pope Francis accepted his resignation on 12 July 2019.

Catholic Church titles
Preceded by Johannes Liku Ada’	— TITULAR — Titular Bishop of Amantia; 11 November 1995 – 14 August 1997	Succeeded by Daniel Robert Jenky
Preceded by József Szendi	Archbishop of Veszprém; 14 August 1997 – 12 July 2019	Succeeded by György Udvardy
