= Galhard de Carceribus =

French papal legate and bishop

Galhard de Carceribus (died 30 May 1348) was a papal legate, bishop of Veszprém (appointed on 2 March 1345), and archbishop of Brindisi (from 19 July 1346 to his death in 1348).

He was born in the Diocese of Cahors. During 1335 to 1343 he visited Poland as a papal legate, to solve the conflict between Poland and the State of the Teutonic Order. He also collected Peter's Pence payment and composed a list of Polish parishes. He died on 30 May 1348 in Nîmes, France.

== Bibliography ==
- H. Chłopocka (1970). "Galhard de Carceribus i jego rola w sporze polsko-krzyżackim w w XIV w.". Europa-Słowiańszczyzna-Polska (in Polish). Poznań: 135–145.

Political offices
Preceded by Stephen Büki	Bishop of Veszprém; 1345–1346	Succeeded by John Garai
Preceded by Guglielmo V.	Archbishop of Brindisi; 1346–1348	Succeeded by Giovanni delle Porta
