= Acerrimo moerore =

1949 letter of Pope Pius XII regarding persecution of the Hungarian church

Acerrimo moerore Latin for 'Deepest pain' Letter of Pope Pius XII
- Signature date: January 2, 1949
- AAS: 41:29-30

Acerrimo moerore (January 2, 1949) is a letter of Pope Pius XII sent to the Hungarian Episcopate after the jailing and torturing of Cardinal Joseph Mindszenty.

== Content of letter ==
The Pope asks the Catholic bishops of Hungary to pray to the Virgin Mary and to include in their prayers to her those who persecute them. They should also pray for those who live in hate and discord, so that with divine assistance better and more peaceful times may descend over Hungary.

The Pope is alarmed over the jailing and torturing of Cardinal Joseph Mindszenty, a violation of human rights and dignity, and an affront against religion itself. Not only the Catholics in Hungary, decent people all over he world watch in horror. The Cardinal stood up for the freedom of the Church and the Hungarian people, and therefore all accusations are highly honourable. The Pope takes part in the continued suffering of the Hungarian bishops. Freedom is so important, that it may be necessary to sacrifice one's life.

The Pope is quite aware of the great tribulations and sufferings which the Church has to endure in Hungary, but he is also aware of the great loyalty and strength of its bishops, who are asked to combine courage with wisdom in this situation. He appeals to them to be united. He reminds them that their forefathers overcame similar problems. They knew that the Christian faith can be maligned and attacked, but never defeated. He appeals to them to follow their example. They will find the most wonderful consolation and help: the consolation to work for the peace and kingdom of Christ. His kingdom is not of this world, because of the mandate, to change behaviour and life, in order to reach through this earthly misery the heavenly kingdom.

The Pope concludes his letter with the most cordial Apostolic Blessings to his brother bishops and their faithful, especially all those who are persecuted.
