= József Szendi =

Hungarian prelate

- Archbishop of Archdiocese of Veszprém Emeritus
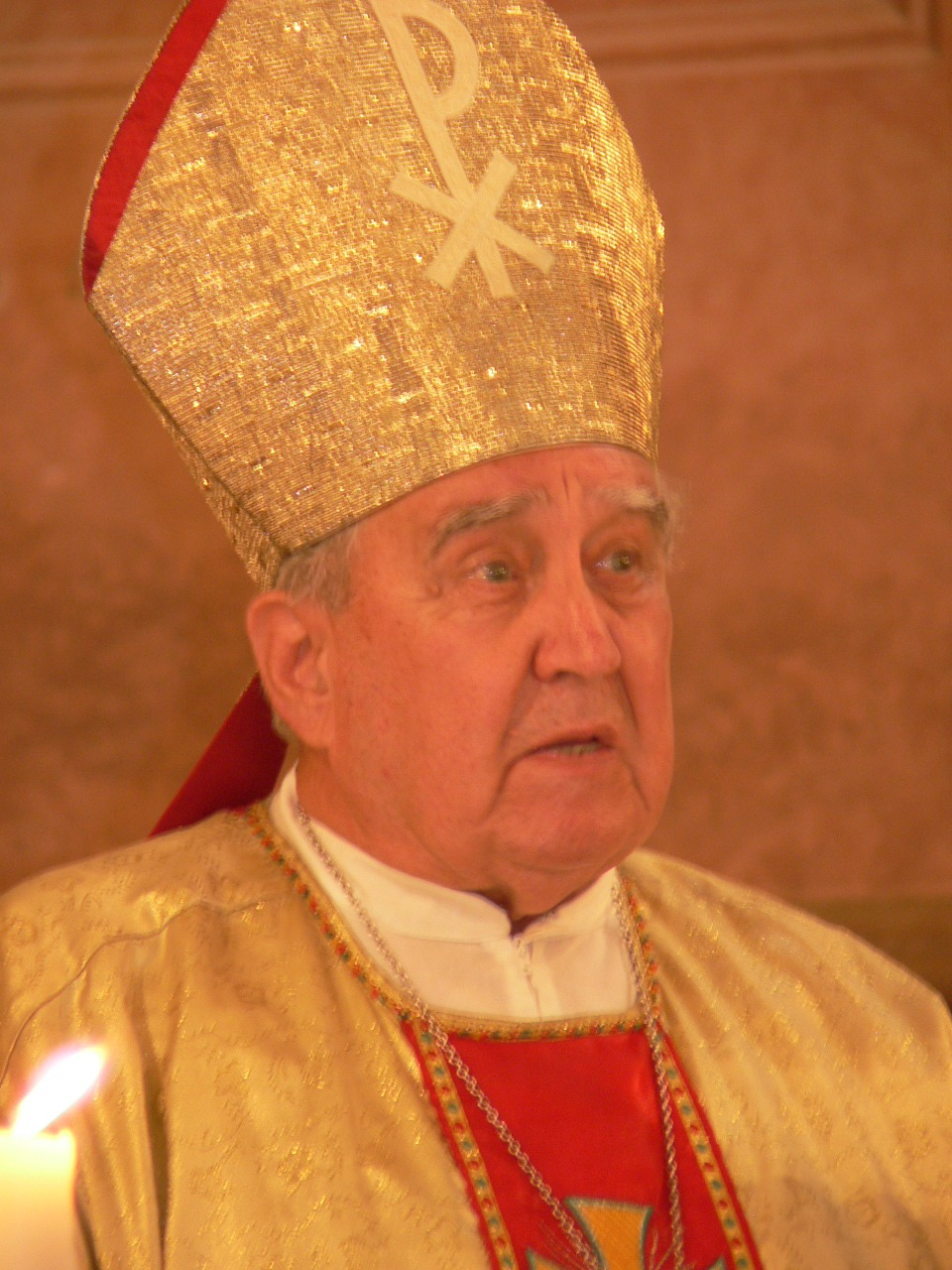
- József Szendi in 2005
- Church: Roman Catholic Church
- See: Archdiocese of Veszprém
- In office: 1983–1997
- Predecessor: László Paskai
- Successor: Gyula Márfi

Orders
- Ordination: 24 December 1944
- Consecration: 21 April 1982 by Laszlo Paskai

Personal details
- Born: 31 October 1921; Székesfehérvár, Hungary
- Died: 23 July 2017 (aged 95); Veszprém, Hungary

József Szendi (31 October 1921 – 23 July 2017) was a Hungarian prelate of the Roman Catholic Church.

== Biography ==
Szendi was born in Székesfehérvár, Hungary and was ordained a priest on 24 December 1944. From 1969 until 1982, he was spiritual of the seminary of Esztergom. Szendi was appointed Apostolic Administrator of the Archdiocese of Veszprém as well as Titular bishop of Stephaniacum on 5 April 1982 and was consecrated bishop on 21 April 1982 by Laszlo Paskai. He was appointed archbishop of the Archdiocese of Veszprém on 3 September 1983 and served until retiring on 14 August 1997.

Catholic Church titles
Preceded by László Paskai	Bishop of Veszprém; 3 September 1983 – 30 May 1993	Succeeded by himself
Preceded by himself	Archbishop of Veszprém; 30 May 1993 – 14 August 1997	Succeeded by Gyula Márfi
