= László Paskai =

Hungarian cardinal

His Eminence László Paskai O.F.M.
- Cardinal, Archbishop Emeritus of Esztergom-Budapest; Spiritual Protector and Chaplain General of the Order of Saint Lazarus
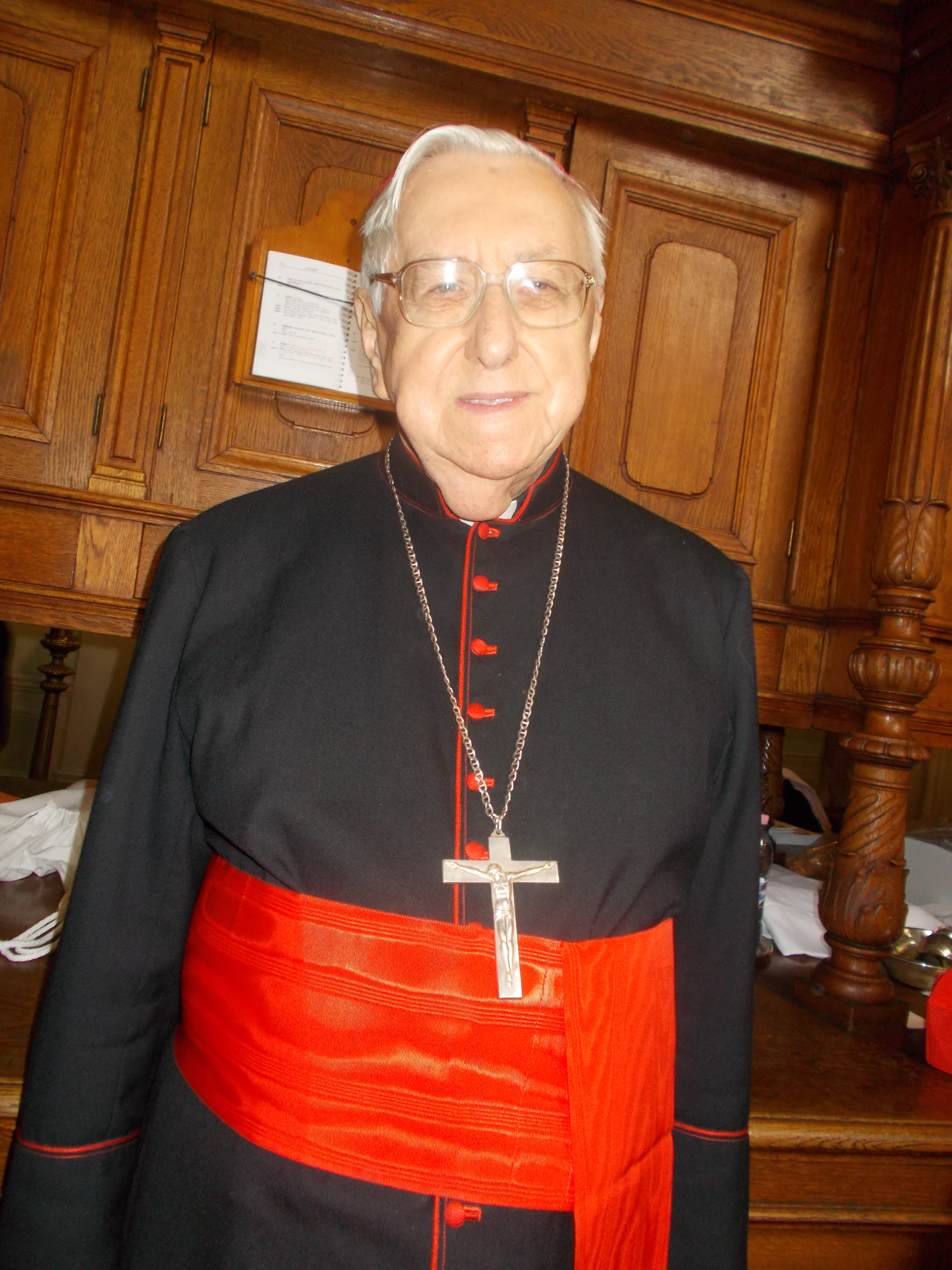
- Archdiocese: Esztergom-Budapest
- Installed: 3 March 1987
- Term ended: 7 December 2002
- Predecessor: László Lékai
- Successor: Péter Erdő
- Other post: Cardinal-Priest of S. Teresa al Corso d’Italia

Orders
- Ordination: 3 March 1951
- Created cardinal: 28 June 1988 by Pope John Paul II
- Rank: Archbishop Emeritus of Esztergom-Budapest

Personal details
- Born: 8 May 1927 Szeged, Hungary
- Died: 17 August 2015 (aged 88) Esztergom, Hungary
- Denomination: Catholic

László Paskai, O.F.M. (8 May 1927 – 17 August 2015) was a Hungarian cardinal of the Catholic Church, He served as the archbishop of Esztergom (renamed to Esztergom-Budapest in 1993) from 1987 to 2002.

He was one of the cardinal electors who participated in the 2005 papal conclave that elected Pope Benedict XVI. He was Spiritual Protector and Chaplain General of the Orléans obedience of the Military and Hospitaller Order of Saint Lazarus of Jerusalem from 2004 to 2012.

== Early life ==
László Paskai was born to Jewish parents who had converted to the Roman Catholic faith before the birth of their son and who later were murdered during The Holocaust.

== Clerical career ==
He was ordained a priest at the age of 23, on 3 March 1951, joining the Order of Friars Minor. After his ordination he did pastoral work in the diocese of Nagyvarad before being sent to Budapest for further studies. In Szeged, he served as episcopal master of ceremonies from 1952 to 1955. After this he was a faculty member and librarian of the seminary, 1955–1962. Thereafter serving as prefect of the Interdiocesan Seminary, faculty member and spiritual director until 1965. He later served as a faculty member and spiritual director and finally rector of the Central Seminary, Budapest. On 2 March 1978 he was chosen Apostolic Administrator of Veszprém, becoming a bishop that same day, with the titular see of Bavagaliana.

Pope John Paul II appointed him Archbishop of Veszprém on 31 March 1979. He was appointed Primate of Hungary and Archbishop of Esztergom on 3 March 1987. He was created Cardinal-Priest of Santa Teresa al Corso d'Italia. In 1993 the Archdiocese of Esztergom was designated Esztergom-Budapest, so that Cardinal Paskai was the first Archbishop of Esztergom-Budapest. Cardinal Paskai retired as Archbishop of Esztergom-Budapest in 2002.

He met with U.S. President George H. W. Bush on 13 October 1989.

== Retirement ==
After his retirement he lived in Esztergom-Szentgyörgymező, not far from the St Adalbert basilica. In 2005 he participated in the Papal Conclave which elected Pope Benedict XVI.

On 17 July 2011, he celebrated the last in a series of requiems for Otto von Habsburg, Hungary's last Crown Prince and since pretender to the throne, in St. Stephen's Basilica in Budapest. He died on 17 August 2015 at the age of 88.

== Distinctions ==
- Spiritual Protector of the separated Orléans Obedience of the Order of Saint Lazarus (2005)

== Notes ==
Catholic Church titles
Preceded by László Kádár	Bishop of Veszprém; 31 March 1979 – 5 April 1982	Succeeded by József Szendi
Preceded by László Lékai	Archbishop of Esztergom-Budapest; 3 March 1987 – 7 December 2002	Succeeded by Péter Erdő
Preceded by Position established	Spiritual Protector and Chaplain General of the Order of st. Lazarus; 12 September 2004 – 14 September 2014	Succeeded by Dominik Duka
