= László Lékai =

Hungarian Archbishop and Cardinal

His Eminence László Lékai
- Cardinal, Archbishop of Esztergom; Primate of Hungary
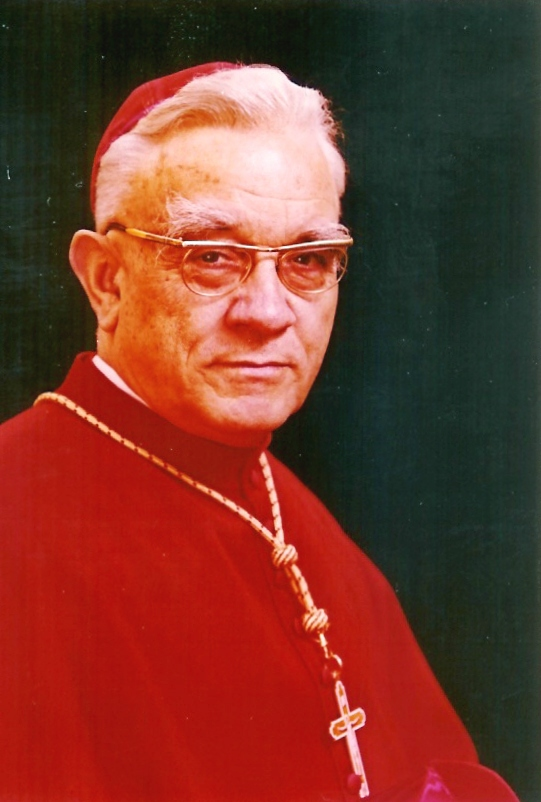
- Church: Roman Catholic
- Archdiocese: Esztergom
- Installed: 1976
- Term ended: 30 June 1986
- Predecessor: József Mindszenty
- Successor: László Paskai
- Other post: Cardinal-Priest of Santa Teresa al Corso d’Italia
- Previous post: Apostolic Administrator of Veszprém (1972-1976)

Orders
- Ordination: 28 October 1934
- Consecration: 16 March 1972
- Created cardinal: 24 May 1976 by Paul VI
- Rank: Cardinal

Personal details
- Born: 12 March 1910 Zalalövő, Hungary, Austria-Hungary
- Died: 30 June 1986 (aged 76) Esztergom, Hungary
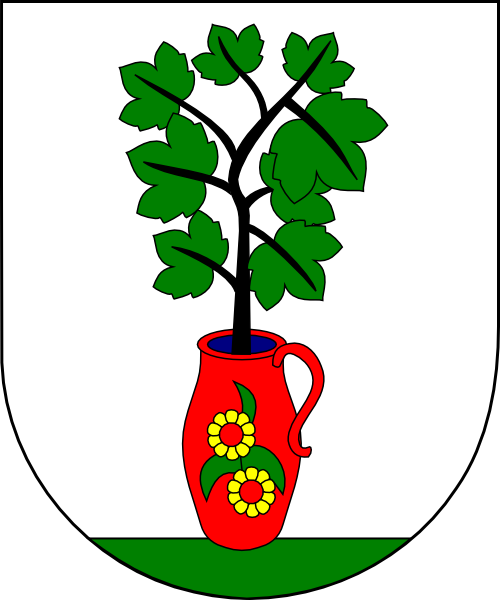
- Coat of arms

Styles of László Lékai
- Reference style: His Eminence
- Spoken style: Your Eminence
- Informal style: Cardinal
- See: Esztergom

László Lékai (12 March 1910 – 30 June 1986) was Archbishop of Esztergom and a Cardinal.

He was ordained to the priesthood on 28 September 1934. He served as a faculty member at the Seminary of Veszprém and did pastoral work in the diocese of Veszprém from 1934 until 1944. He served as private secretary to the future Cardinal József Mindszenty, who was at that time Bishop of Veszprém. He was imprisoned in a Nazi prison from November 1944 to February 1945. He was appointed a Privy chamberlain supernumerary on 22 January 1946.

== Episcopate ==
He was appointed titular Bishop of Giro di Tarasio and appointed apostolic administrator, ad nutum Sanctæ Sedis, of Veszprém in 1972. He was appointed as Apostolic administrator of Esztergom on 5 February 1974. Pope Paul VI appointed him to the metropolitan and primatial see of Esztergom in 1976.

== Cardinalate ==
Pope Paul VI created him Cardinal-Priest of S. Teresa al Corso d'Italia in the consistory of 24 May 1976. He took part in the conclave of 25 to 26 August 1978 and in the conclave of 14 to 16 October 1978.

== Sources ==
- Gabriel Adriányi: The Ostpolitik of the Vatican 1958–1978 against Hungary. The case Cardinal Mindszenty. Schäfer, Herne 2003.

Catholic Church titles
Preceded by József Mindszenty	Archbishop of Esztergom; 12 February 1976 – 30 June 1986	Succeeded by László Paskai
