= Pördefölde =

Coordinates: 46°35′N 16°43′E

- Village
- Interactive map of Pördefölde
- Country: Hungary
- Region: Western Transdanubia
- County: Zala County
- Time zone: UTC+1 (CET)
  - Summer (DST): UTC+2 (CEST)

Pördefölde is a village in Zala County, Hungary.
