= Archdiocese of Veszprém =

Latin Catholic archdiocese in Hungary

Coordinates: 47.0972°N 17.9030°E

Archdiocese of Veszprém Archidioecesis Veszprimiensis Veszprémi Főegyházmegye

Catholic
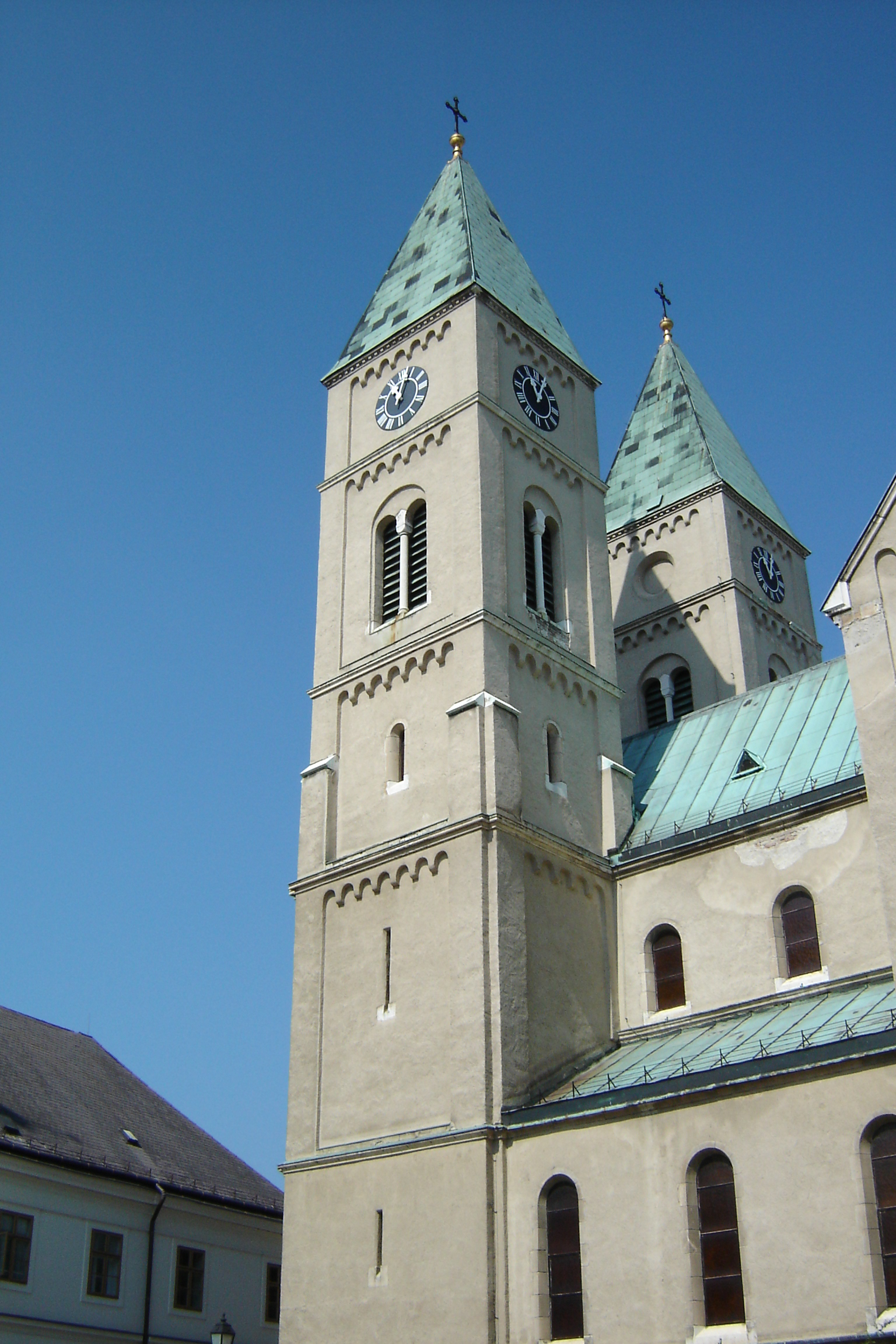
- St. Michael's Cathedral, Veszprém

Location
- Country: Hungary
- Ecclesiastical province: Veszprém

Statistics
- Area: 6,920 km^{2} (2,670 sq mi)
- Population: Total; Catholics: (as of 2014); 461,500; 335,600 (72.7%)
- Parishes: 180

Information
- Denomination: Catholic Church
- Sui iuris church: Latin Church
- Rite: Roman Rite
- Established: 1009 (As Diocese of Veszprém); 31 May 1993 (As Archdiocese of Veszprém)
- Cathedral: St. Michael's Cathedral, Veszprém

Current leadership
- Pope: Leo XIV
- Metropolitan Archbishop: György Udvardy (appointed by Pope Francis on July 12, 2019; formerly, Bishop of the Diocese of Pécs, in Pécs, Hungary
- Suffragans: Diocese of Szombathely; Diocese of Kaposvár
- Vicar General: Miklós Szerenka
- Bishops emeritus: Archbishop Emeritus Gyula Márfi

Map
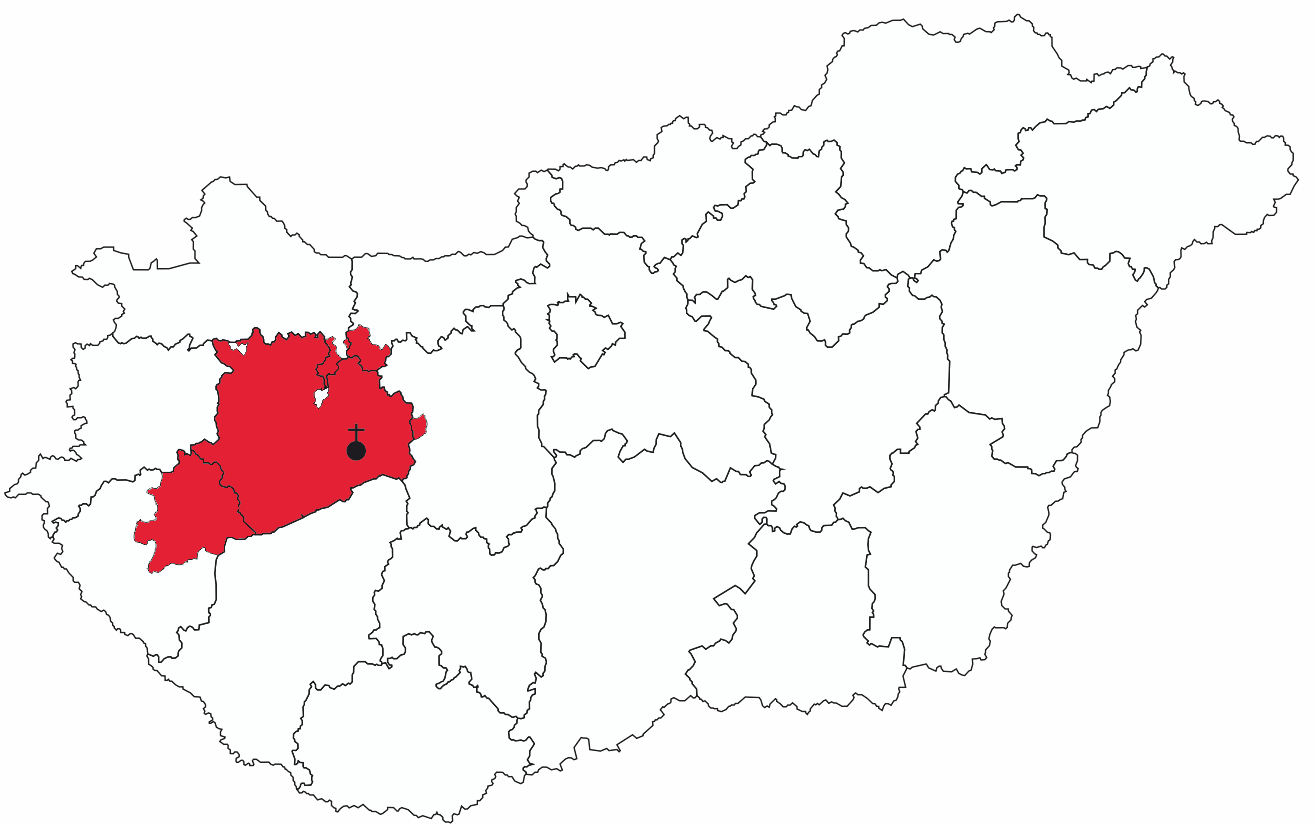
- Map of the Diocese

Website
- Website

The Archdiocese of Veszprém (Hungarian: Veszprémi Főegyházmegye, Latin: Archidioecesis Veszprimiensis) is a Latin Church archdiocese of the Catholic Church in Hungary. Believed to have been established in 1009 AD by King Stephen I of Hungary, as the Diocese of Veszprém, the diocese was originally a suffragan to the Archdiocese of Esztergom. In 1993, the Diocese was elevated to an Archdiocese. The Archdiocese is the Metropolitan of the Diocese of Kaposvár and the Diocese of Szombathely.

The Cathedral of Veszprém is dedicated to Saint Michael. The current archbishop is György Udvardy, formerly Bishop of Pecs, who was appointed by Pope Francis on July 12, 2019, to succeed the retiring Gyula Márfi.

== List of the Bishops and Archbishops of Veszprém ==
- Stephen (c. 1009)
- Modestus (or Buldi; c. 1046)
- Nicholas (or Clement; c. 1055)
- George (c. 1061)
- Andrew (c. 1062–1081)
- Franco (c. 1081?)
- John I (c. 1082)
- Cosmas (1087–1090)
- Almarius (c. 1091)
- Matthew (1111–1117)
- Nana (1121–1131)
- Martyrius (before 1135)
- Peter I (1135–1138)
- Paul (c. 1142)
- Peta (c. 1156)
- Benedict II (c. 1171)
- John II (1181–1193)
- Calanda (1199–1209)
- Robert (1209–1225)
- Bartholomew (1226–1243)
- Zlaudus (1245–1262)
- Paul II (1263–1275)
- Peter II Kőszegi (1275–1289)
- Benedict II (1290–1309)
- Stephen II Kéki (1310–1322)
- Henry (1323–1333)
- Duke Mieszko Piast (1335–1343)
- Stephen III Büki (1344–1345)
- Galhard de Carceribus (1345–1346)
- John III Garai (1347–1357)
- Ladislaus I Zsámboki (1358–1371)
- Ladislaus II Deméndi (1373–1377)
- Peter III Siklósi (1378)
- Benedict III Himházi (1379–1387)
- Demetrius I Vajdai (1387–1392)
- Pietro Isvalies (1503–1511)
- Petar Berislavić/Péter Beriszló (1512–1520)
- Pavol Várdai (1521–1523)
- Thomas Szalaházy (1524–1526)
- Martin I Kecseti (1528–1548)
- Paul III Bornemissza (1549–1553)
- Andrew I Köves (1553–1568)
- Stephen IV Fejérkövy (1573–1587)
- Francis I Forgách (1587–1596)
- Andrew II Monoszloy (1596–1601)
- Louis Újlaky (1603–1605)
- Demetrius II Napragy (1605–1606)
- Valentin Lépes (1608)
- Peter IV Radovith (1608)
- Francis II Erghely (1608–1628)
- Stephen V Kissennyei-Sennyey (1628–1630)
- Stephen VI Csíkmádéfalvi-Szentandrásy (1630)
- Paul IV David (1630–1633)
- George I Lippay (1633–1637)
- George II Orlovai-Jakusyth (1637–1642)
- Stephen VII Magyarbéli-Bosnyák (1642–1644)
- George III Szelepcsény (1644–1648)
- George IV Széchényi (1648–1658)
- Paul V Hoffmann (1658–1659)
- Stephen VII Kissennyei-Sennyey (1659–1683)
- Paul VI Széchényi (1687–1710)
- Otto Jochannes Volkra von Heidenreichstein (1710–1720)
- Count Emeric Esterházy (1723–1725)
- Adam Acsády (1725–1744)
- Martin II Padányi-Bíró (1745–1762)
- Ignatius Nagymányai-Koller (1762–1773)
- John IV Bajzáth (1777–1802)
- Paul VI Rosos (1808–1809)
- George V Kurbély (1809–1821)
- Anton Makay (1823–1825)
- John V Kopácsy (1825–1847)
- Count Dominic Zichy (1847–1849)
- John VI Ranolder (1849–1875)
- Sigismund Kovács (1877–1887)
- Baron Charles Hornig (1888–1917)
- Nándor Rott (1917–1939)
- Tihamér Tóth (1939)
- Gyula Czapik (1939–1943)
- József Mindszenty (1943–1945)
- Ladislaus Bánáss (1946–1949)
- Bartholomew Alexander Badalik (1949–1965)
- Ladislaus Kádár (1975–1978)
- Ladislaus Paskai (1979–1982)
- József Szendi (1983–1997)
- Gyula Márfi (1997–2019)
- György Udvardy (since 2019)

== Sources ==
- Balogh, Margit - Gergely, Jenő: Egyházak az újkori Magyarországon (1790–1992) - Adattár (MTA Történettudományi Intézete, Budapest, 1996)
- Korai Magyar Történeti Lexikon (9-14. század), főszerkesztő: Kristó, Gyula, szerkesztők: Engel, Pál és Makk, Ferenc (Akadémiai Kiadó, Budapest, 1994)
- Fallenbüchl, Zoltán: Magyarország főispánjai 1526-1848 (Argumentum, Budapest, 1994)
- Magyarország Történeti Kronológiája I-III. – A kezdetektől 1526-ig; 1526–1848, 1848-1944, főszerkesztő: Benda, Kálmán (Akadémiai Kiadó, Budapest, 1981, 1982, 1993)
- Magyar Történelmi Fogalomtár I-II. – A-K; L-ZS, főszerkesztő: Bán, Péter (Gondolat, Budapest, 1989)
- Fallenbüchl, Zoltán: Magyarország főméltóságai (Maecenas, 1988)
- Karácsonyi, János: Magyarország egyháztörténete főbb vonásaiban 970-től 1900-ig (Könyvértékesítő Vállalat, Budapest, 1985)
