= József Mindszenty =

Hungarian cardinal (1892–1975)

Venerable József Mindszenty
- Cardinal, Archbishop of Esztergom; Prince-Primate of Hungary
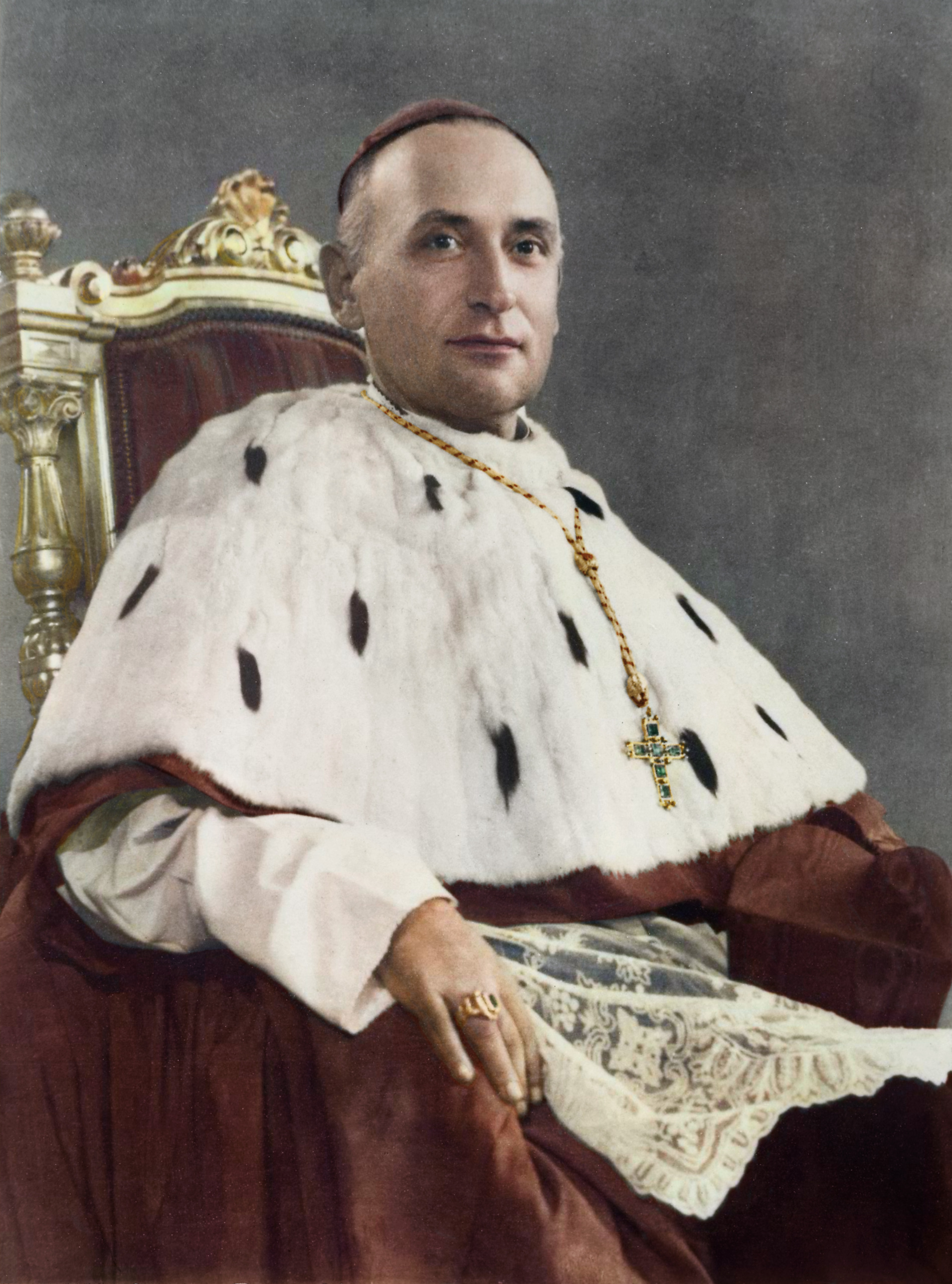
- Mindszenty in 1945
- Archdiocese: Esztergom
- Appointed: 2 October 1945
- Term ended: 19 December 1973
- Predecessor: Jusztinián György Serédi
- Successor: László Lékai
- Other post: Cardinal Priest of Santo Stefano al Monte Celio (1946–1974)
- Previous post: Bishop of Veszprém (1944–1945)

Orders
- Ordination: 12 June 1915 by János Mikes
- Consecration: 25 March 1944 by Jusztinián György Serédi
- Created cardinal: 18 February 1946 by Pope Pius XII
- Rank: Cardinal priest

Personal details
- Born: József Pehm; March 29, 1892 Csehimindszent, Kingdom of Hungary
- Died: 6 May 1975 (aged 83) Vienna, Austria
- Buried: Esztergom Basilica
- Parents: József Pehm; Borbála Kovács
- Motto: Pannonia Sacra
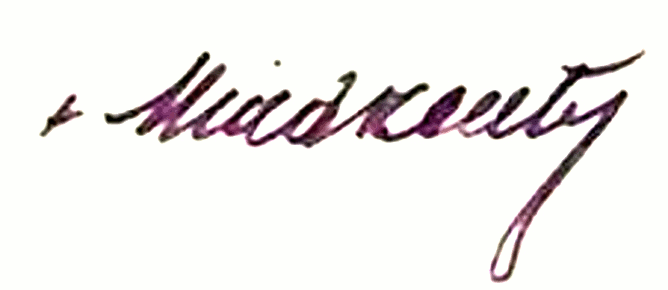
- Signature: József Mindszenty's signature

- Coat of arms: József Mindszenty's coat of arms

Sainthood
- Venerated in: Catholic Church

Styles of József Mindszenty
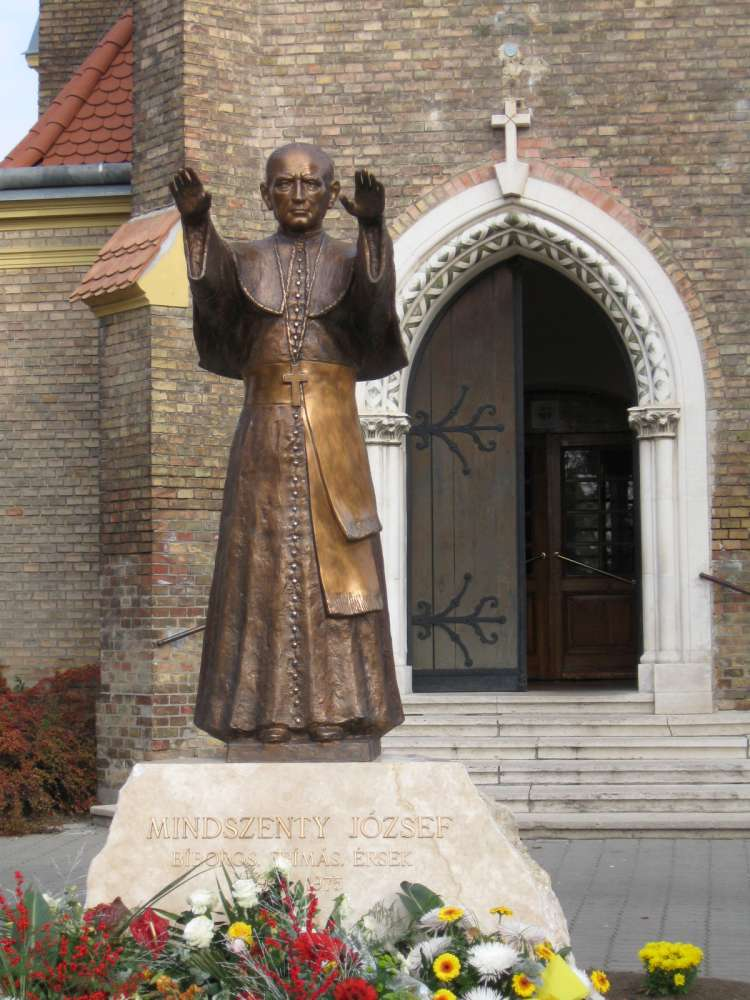
- Reference style: His Eminence
- Spoken style: Your Eminence
- Religious style: His Eminence
- Posthumous style: Venerable
- Informal style: Cardinal
- See: Esztergom

Ordination history of József Mindszenty
History
Priestly ordination
- Ordained by: János Mikes (Szombathely)
- Date: 12 July 1915
Episcopal consecration
- Principal consecrator: Jusztinián György Card. Serédi (Esztergom)
- Co-consecrators: Lajos Shvoy (Székesfehérvár); Jozsef Pétery (Vác)
- Date: 25 March 1944
Cardinalate
- Date: 18 February 1946
Episcopal succession
Bishops consecrated by József Mindszenty as principal consecrator
- Károly Kolman Papp: 16 June 1946
- László Bánáss: 30 November 1946
- Ferenc Rogács: 29 June 1948

József Mindszenty (Note: Hungarian pronunciation: [jo:ʒɛf mindsɛnti]) (29 March 1892 – 6 May 1975) was a Hungarian cardinal of the Catholic Church who served as Archbishop of Esztergom and leader of the Catholic Church in Hungary from 1945 to 1973. According to the Encyclopedia Britannica, for five decades "he personified uncompromising opposition to fascism and communism in Hungary".

During World War II, Mindszenty was imprisoned by the pro-Nazi Arrow Cross Party. After the war, he opposed communism and communist persecution in his country. As a result, he was tortured and given a life sentence in a 1949 show trial that generated worldwide condemnation, including a United Nations resolution.

After eight years in prison, Mindszenty was freed in the Hungarian Revolution of 1956 and granted political asylum by the United States embassy in Budapest. He lived there for the next fifteen years. He was finally allowed to leave the country in 1971, and died in exile in 1975 in Vienna, Austria.

His cause for sainthood was opened in 1993 and Pope Francis declared him Venerable in 2019.

== Early life and career ==
Mindszenty was born on 29 March 1892 in Csehimindszent, Vas County, Austria-Hungary, to József Pehm and Borbála Kovács. His father was a magistrate. He attended St Norbert's Premonstratensian High Grammar School in Szombathely, before entering the Szombathely Diocesan Seminary in 1911.

Mindszenty was ordained a priest by Bishop János Mikes on 12 June 1915, the Feast of the Sacred Heart. In 1917, the first of his books, Motherhood, was published. He was arrested by Mihály Károlyi's progressive government on 9 February 1919 for speaking out against its 'socialist policies', then rearrested by the communist Béla Kun government on 31 July that year.

In 1939, Mindszenty urged his followers to vote against the Arrow Cross Party. In 1940, he published a pamphlet, "The Green Communism", in which he characterized the Hungarian Nyilas Nazi Movement as diabolic and as evil as the communists. Green was the color of the Nyilas uniform.

In 1941, during a Magyarization campaign amongst Germans living in Hungary, he adopted his new Hungarian name of Mindszenty, part of his home village's name. On 25 March 1944, he was consecrated Bishop of Veszprém. Mindszenty organized a letter to the Nazi authorities urging them not to fight in Western Hungary; he also protested to Miklós Horthy in favor of converted Jews. After Horthy was overthrown, Mindszenty was arrested on 27 November 1944 for his opposition to the Arrow Cross government's plan to quarter soldiers in parts of his official palace. In April 1945, with the Arrow Cross puppet state collapsing, Mindszenty was released from house arrest at a church in Sopron.

== Church leader and opposition to communism ==
Following the fall of the Kingdom of Hungary, Mindszenty was disappointed, as "deep down in his soul he remained a monarchist to the end of his life." On 15 September 1945, Mindszenty was appointed Primate of Hungary and Archbishop of Esztergom, the seat of the head of the Catholic Church in Hungary. On 21 February 1946, Archbishop Mindszenty was elevated to Cardinal-Priest of Santo Stefano Rotondo by Pope Pius XII, who reportedly told him, "Among these thirty-two you will be the first to suffer the martyrdom symbolized by this red color."

To the ruling Hungarian Working People's Party, Mindszenty was regarded as the archetypal figure of "clerical reaction". He continued to use the traditional title of prince-primate (hercegprímás) even after the use of noble and royal titles was outlawed by the 1946 puppet parliament. He contacted the US embassy, asking it to "engage in activities which were simply not diplomatically proper or politically feasible", for which he was rebuked by the embassy. In addition to such contacts, the Party accused him of having "aristocratic attitudes" and attacked his demands for compensation following the state seizure of church-owned farmlands during the Party's campaign to abolish private farm ownership. Because the main source of income for the Church was its agricultural lands, confiscations by the communist government left many Church-run institutions destitute.

Cardinal Mindszenty believed and preached that "The Church asks for no secular protection; it seeks shelter under the protection of God alone". For this reason, he fought fiercely against the state policy to emancipate the Hungarian educational system from Church control by seizing parochial schools.

In 1948, religious orders were banned by the government. Soon after, the communist dictator in Hungary, Mátyás Rákosi accused the Cardinal and the Catholic Church of being both "the largest landowner in Hungary" and "a reactionary force in our country, supporting the monarchy and later the fascist dictatorship of Admiral Horthy". These, Rákosi claimed, were the only reasons for Mindszenty's opposition to the Party's policy of land confiscation.

On 26 December 1948, Cardinal Mindszenty was arrested and accused of treason, conspiracy, and other offences against the new Hungarian People's Republic. Shortly before his arrest, he wrote a note to the effect that he had not been involved in any conspiracy and that any confession he might make would be the result of duress. While imprisoned, Mindszenty was repeatedly hit with rubber truncheons and subjected to other forms of abuse, until he agreed to confess.

Mindszenty's forced confession included the following "admissions": orchestrating the theft of the Crown of Saint Stephen for the sole purpose of crowning Crown Prince Otto von Habsburg as King of Hungary, scheming to overthrow the Party and reestablish capitalism, planning a third World War, and, once it had been won by the Americans, plotting to assume supreme political power himself.

Almost alone among the Western news media, reporter George Seldes, who had previously been expelled from the Soviet Union and fascist Italy for his reporting, believed the allegations against Cardinal Mindszenty. Seldes spent the rest of his life accusing Mindszenty of being a Nazi collaborator, a Holocaust perpetrator, and a virulent antisemite. In his 1987 memoirs, Seldes wrote, "In 1948 the entire American section of the resident foreign press corps in Hungary implored me to report the facts about Cardinal Mindszenty's collaboration with the Nazis, his part in the deportation of the Jewish population to Hitler's death camps, and also to expose the scores of fraudulent news items coming from outside Hungary, from Vienna, London, Prague, and Rome especially, alleging drugging and torturing of the Cardinal." Seldes was the only one to dispute that Mindszenty was tortured by the Communists. The Pope and the international community at the time believed that Mindszenty had been tortured. Even at his show trial, the prosecution did not make the charge or provide evidence of antisemitism or Nazi collaboration.

On 3 February 1949, Mindszenty's show trial began. The Cardinal admitted to being involved in a Habsburg restorationist organization which planned to form a government after an American invasion, however he denied hoping for the outbreak of war. He said "we prayed for peace". He accepted the charges of smuggling tens of thousands of dollars into Hungary, and admitted his contacts with Otto von Habsburg and American politicians, but did not admit to willful espionage on behalf of foreign powers. In court, Mindszenty said about the charges: "I do not deny one or another part of it, but I do not subscribe to the conclusion". As he followed the trial, a weeping Pope Pius XII told Sister Pascalina Lehnert, "My words have come true and all I can do is pray; I cannot help him any other way." On 8 February, Mindszenty was sentenced to life imprisonment for black marketeering, treason and espionage. The government released a white book, Documents on the Mindszenty Case, containing his alleged confessions and case materials.

New York's Cardinal Spellman was a friend of Mindszenty and gave sermons at St. Patrick's Cathedral in support of the Hungarian.

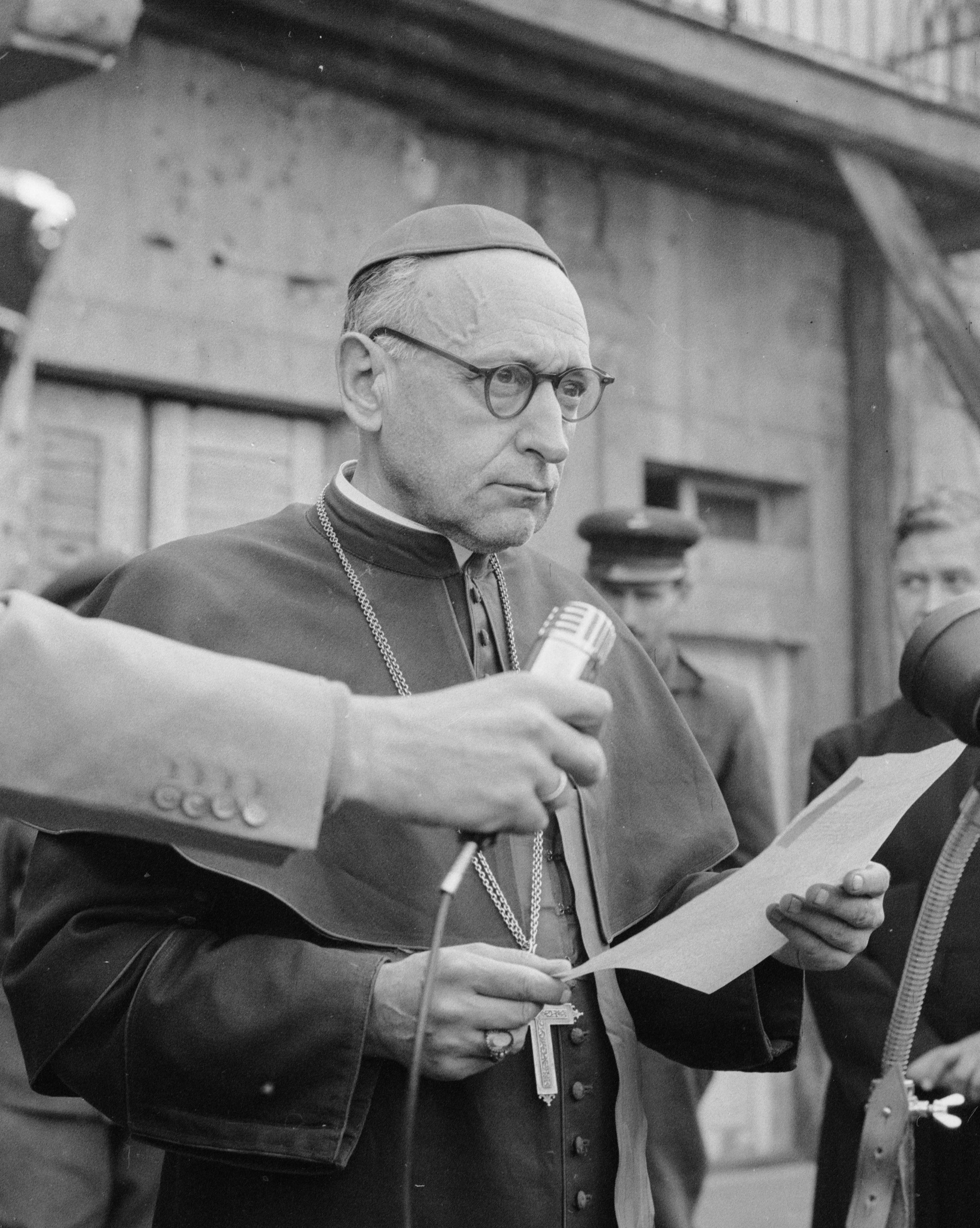
Cardinal Mindszenty during speech on 1 November 1956

On 12 February 1949, Pope Pius XII announced the excommunication of all persons involved in the trial and conviction of Mindszenty. On 20 February 1949, the Pope addressed a series of questions to a crowd which had gathered in St. Peter's Square to protest the Cardinal's show trial, asking:

Do you want a Church that remains silent when She should speak; that diminishes the law of God where She is called to proclaim it loudly, wanting to accommodate it to the will of man? Do you want a Church that departs from the unshakable foundations upon which Christ founded Her, taking the easy way of adapting Herself to the opinion of the day; a Church that is a prey to current trends; a Church that does not condemn the suppression of conscience and does not stand up for the just liberty of the people; a Church that locks Herself up within the four walls of Her temple in unseemly sycophancy, forgetting the divine mission received from Christ: 'Go out the crossroads and preach the people'? Beloved sons and daughters! Spiritual heirs of numberless confessors and martyrs! Is this the Church you venerate and love? Would you recognize in such a Church the features of your Mother? Would you be able to imagine a Successor of St. Peter submitting to such demands?

According to Sister Pascalina, who witnessed the rally, "In reply to the Holy Father came a single cry like thunder still ringing in our ears: 'No!'"

In Acerrimo moerore, an apostolic letter to the Hungarian Episcopate, the Pope publicly condemned the Cardinal's conviction and described his tortures..

Over seven years later, on 30 October 1956, in the midst of the Hungarian Revolution, Mindszenty was released from prison. He returned to Budapest the next day, and on 2 November, praised the insurgents. The following day, he made a radio broadcast in favor of recent anti-communist developments.

== Confinement at the US embassy ==
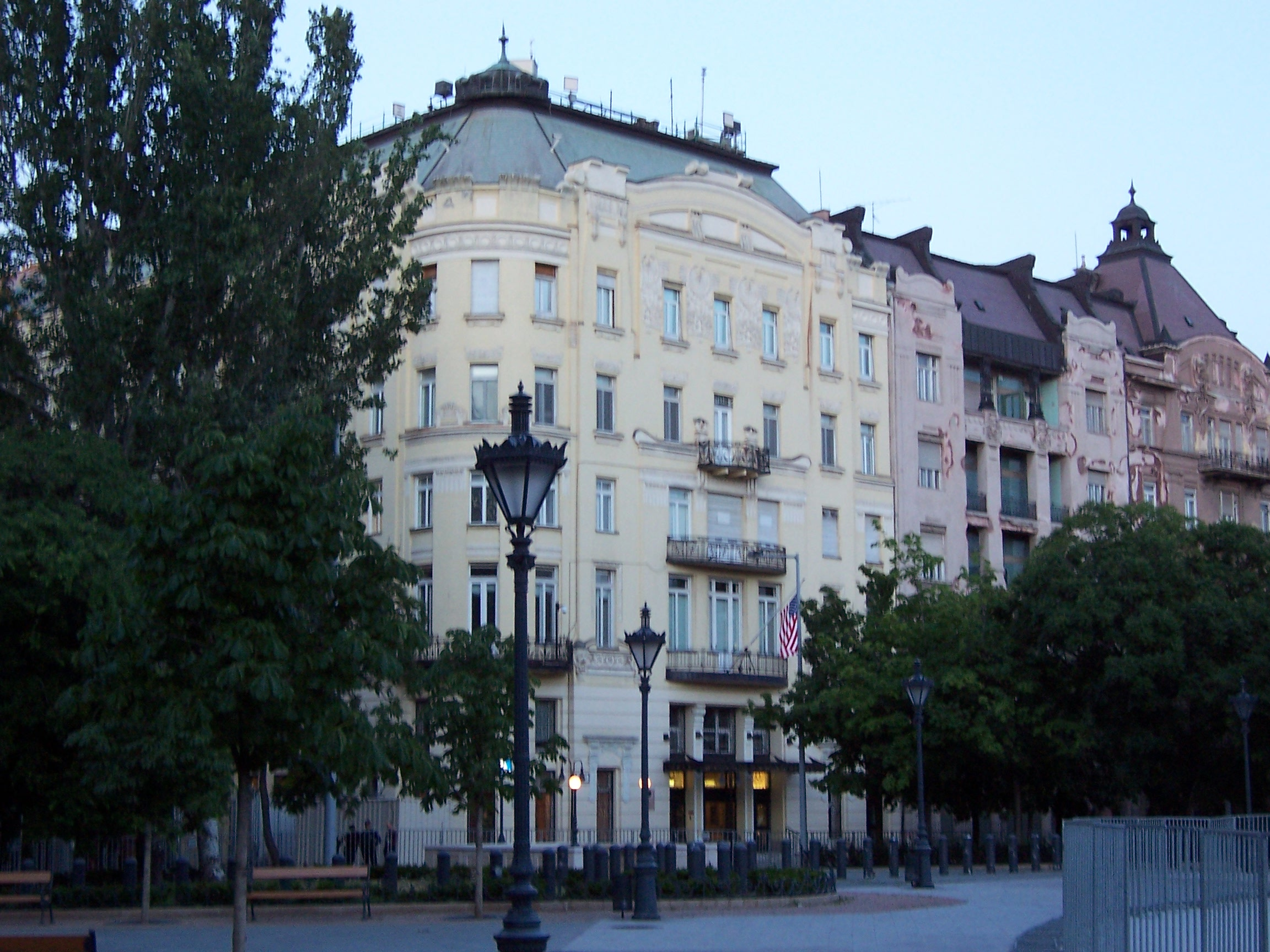
U.S. Embassy in Budapest

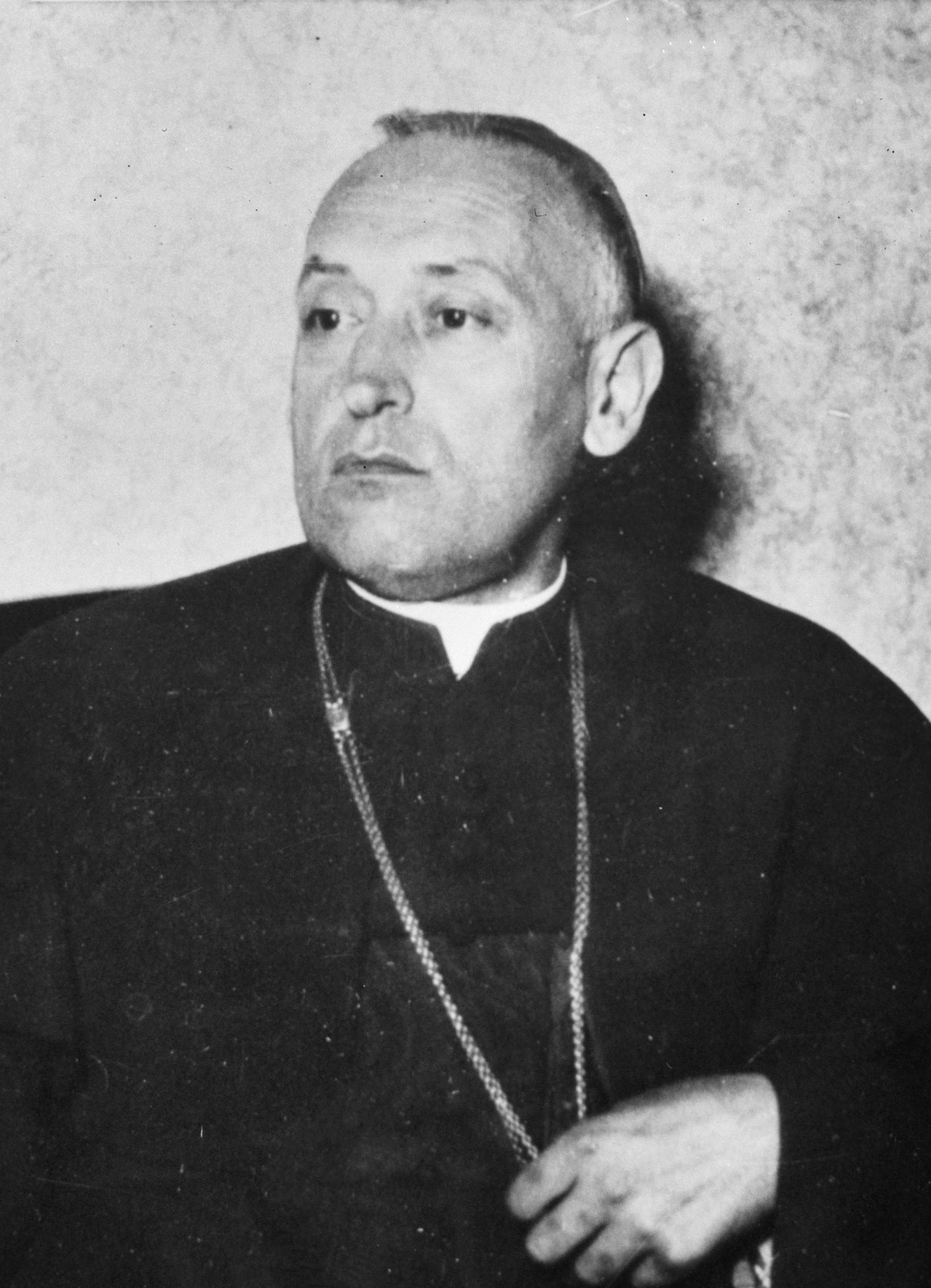
Mindszenty in the early 1960s

On 4 November 1956, when the Soviet Union invaded Hungary to restore the communist government, Cardinal Mindszenty sought Imre Nagy's advice, and was granted political asylum at the United States embassy in Budapest. Mindszenty lived there for the next 15 years, unable to leave the grounds, and did not participate in the papal conclaves of 1958 and 1963.

György Aczél, the communist official in charge of all cultural and religious matters in Hungary, felt increasingly uncomfortable about Mindszenty's plight in the late 1960s when the latter fell seriously ill and rumors spread of his impending death. Yet Aczél failed to convince party leader János Kádár that commuting Mindszenty's sentence would create valuable confusion in the Holy See and allow the state to better control the remaining clergy.

== Exile ==
Eventually, Pope Paul VI offered a compromise: declaring Mindszenty a "victim of history" (instead of communism) and annulling the excommunication imposed on the people involved in his trial. The Hungarian government allowed Mindszenty to leave the country on 28 September 1971. Beginning on 23 October 1971, he lived in Vienna, Austria, as he took offence at Rome's advice that he should resign from the primacy of the Catholic Church in Hungary in exchange for uncensored publication of his memoirs backed by the Holy See. Although most bishops retire at or near age 75, Mindszenty continually denied rumors of his resignation and was not required by canon law to step down at the time.

In December 1973, at the age of 81, Mindszenty was stripped of his titles by the Pope, who declared the Archdiocese of Esztergom officially vacated, but who refused to fill the seat while Mindszenty was still alive. Mindszenty visited Hungarian emigrants in 1975 in Caracas, Venezuela, and then Bogotá, Colombia. Just after this visit, he traveled back to Europe feeling quite ill. Mindszenty died on 6 May 1975, at the age of 83, in exile in Vienna. In early 1976, the Pope made Bishop László Lékai the primate of Hungary, ending a long struggle with the communist government.

== Legacy ==
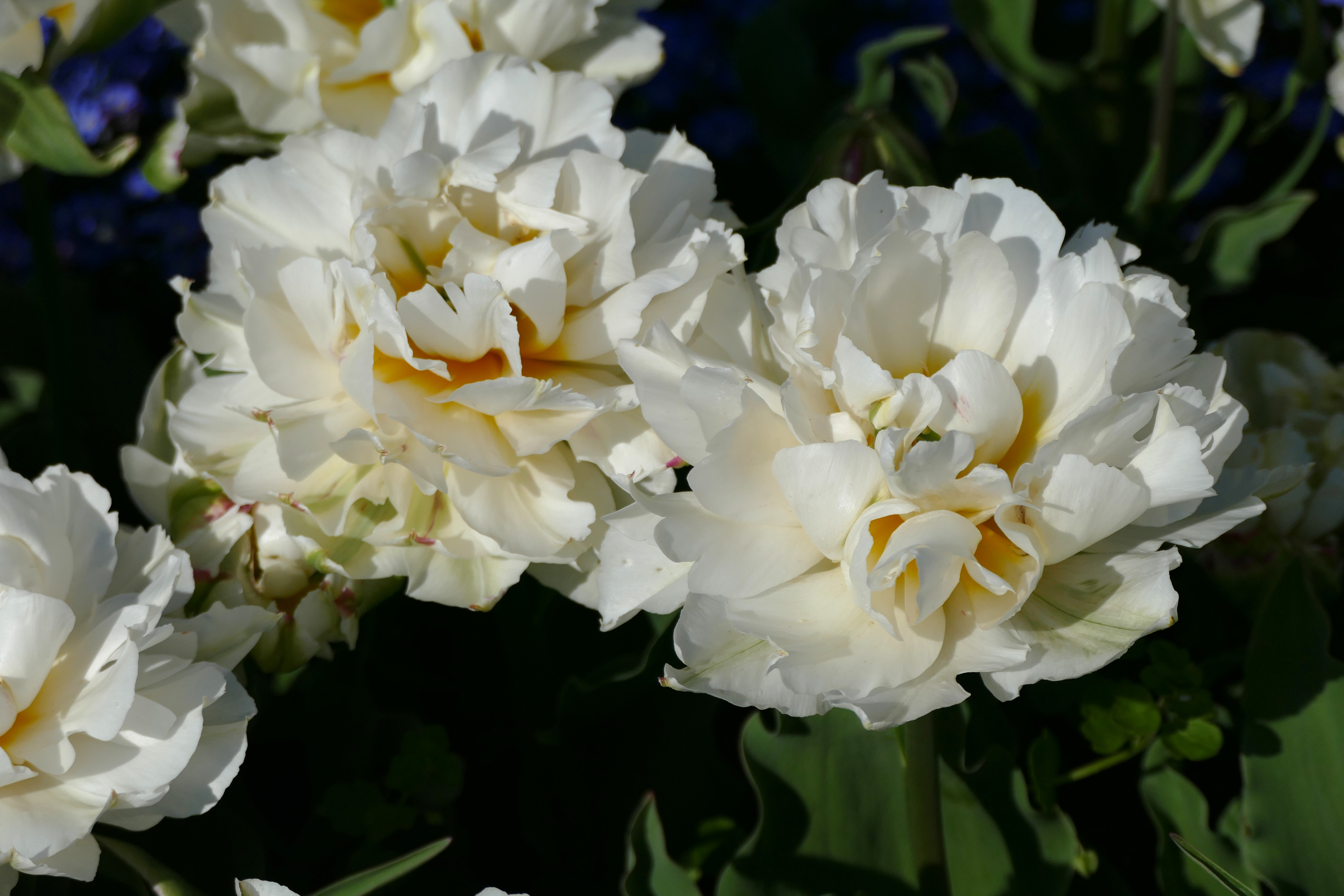
Doube early tulipa cultivar 'Cardinal Mindszenty' named after József Mindszenty

In 1991, Mindszenty's remains were repatriated to Esztergom by the newly elected government and buried in the basilica there.

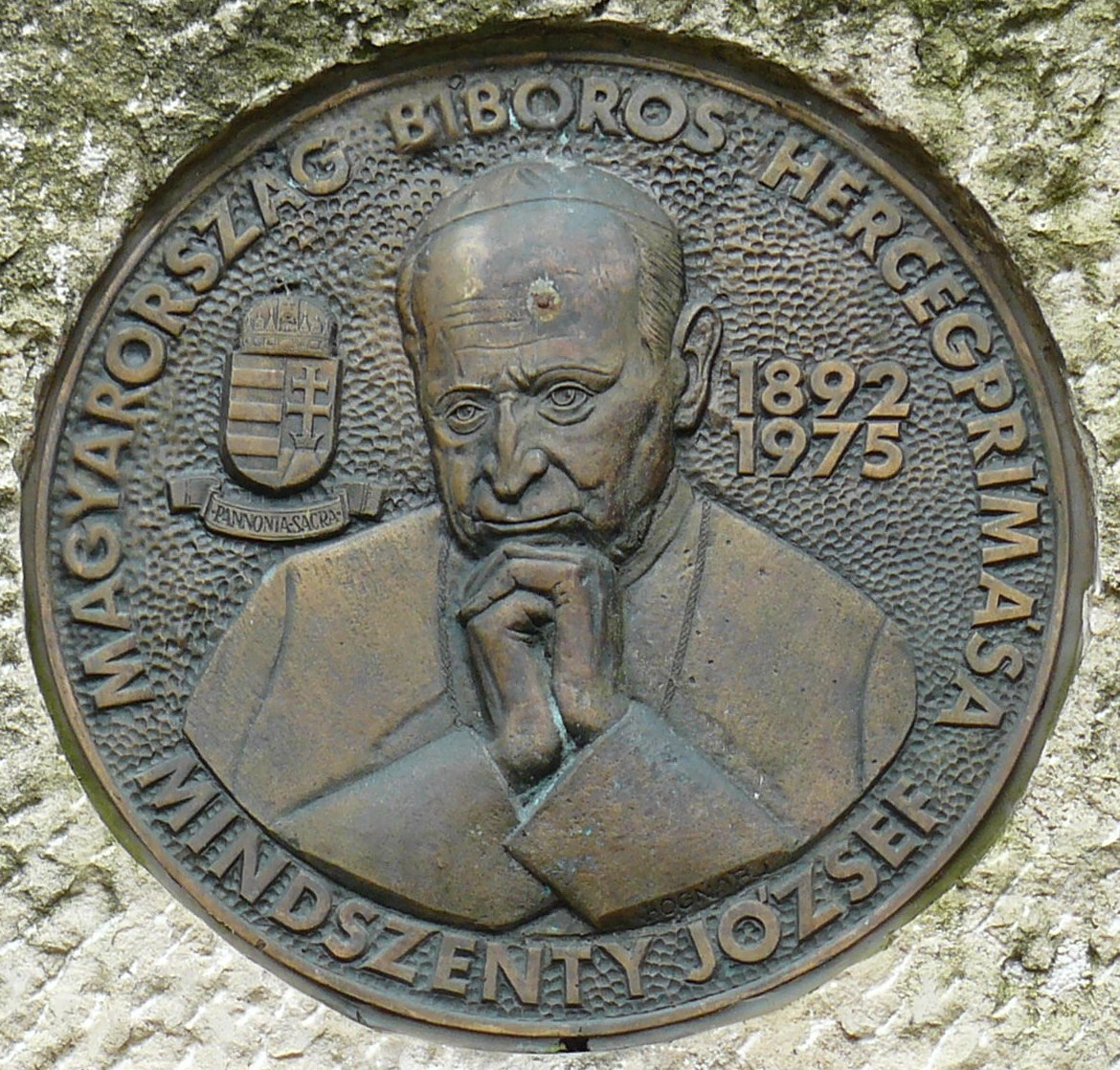
József Mindszenty memorial plaque in Budapest, Hungary

Mindszenty is widely admired in modern-day Hungary for his courage and resolve while opposing the Arrow Cross Party, during Communist imprisonment, and in exile.

The Mindszenty Museum in Esztergom is dedicated to the life of the Cardinal. A commemorative statue of Cardinal Mindszenty stands at St. Ladislaus Church in New Brunswick, New Jersey, US. A monument was donated by the Hungarian community of Greater Cleveland in 1977 and stands at Cardinal Mindszenty Plaza in downtown Cleveland. Mindszenty is remembered in Santiago, Chile with a memorial in Parque Bustamante, the same park where a monument to the martyrs of the 1956 Hungarian Revolution stands.

In June 1974, Cardinal Mindszenty visited the Woodside Priory School in Portola Valley, California. The school was founded by seven Hungarian Benedictine monks, associated with Saint Martin's Archabbey in Pannonhalma, who fled the repression in Hungary following the 1956 revolution. A bronze memorial was placed on the school's campus noting his visit. The Cardinal's visit to the San Francisco Bay Area included Mass in December 1974 at St. Raymond Church in Menlo Park, California; a monument commemorating the service was placed on parish grounds.

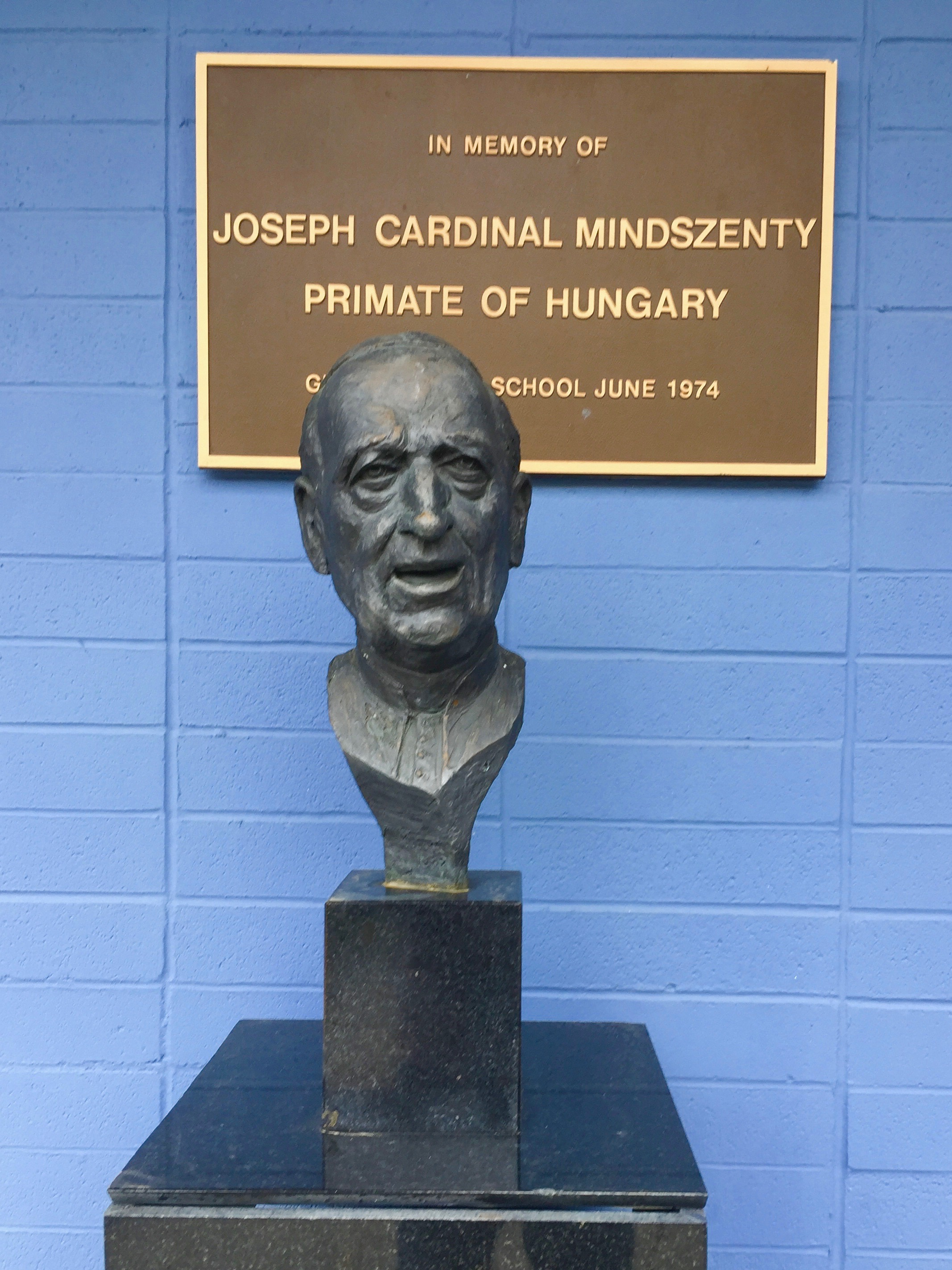
Cardinal Mindszenty Visit to Woodside Priory School Memorial June 1974

== Beatification process ==
The beatification and eventual canonization of Cardinal Mindszenty has been on the Hungarian Catholic Church's agenda ever since communism fell in 1989, and the 2005–2013 pontificate of Pope Benedict XVI was seen by many analysts as an excellent opportunity to achieve both, as the Pope had commented favourably on Mindszenty's calling and legacy.

The cause for the cardinal's beatification opened on 15 June 1993; Mindszenty became titled as a Servant of God after the Congregation for the Causes of Saints (CCS) assented to introducing the cause in a decree nihil obstat ("no objection"). The diocesan process (collecting his spiritual writings and collecting witness interrogatories to attest to his reputation for holiness) opened in Esztergom on 19 March 1994 and closed 17 October 1996; the CCS validated the process as having complied with their regulations in Rome on 8 November 1999. In 2012, the Hungarian Bishops' Conference reaffirmed its support for continuing the late cardinal's cause for beatification. Theologians voiced their approval for the cause on 14 June 2018.

Pope Francis declared Mindszenty venerable on 12 February 2019.

== In popular culture ==
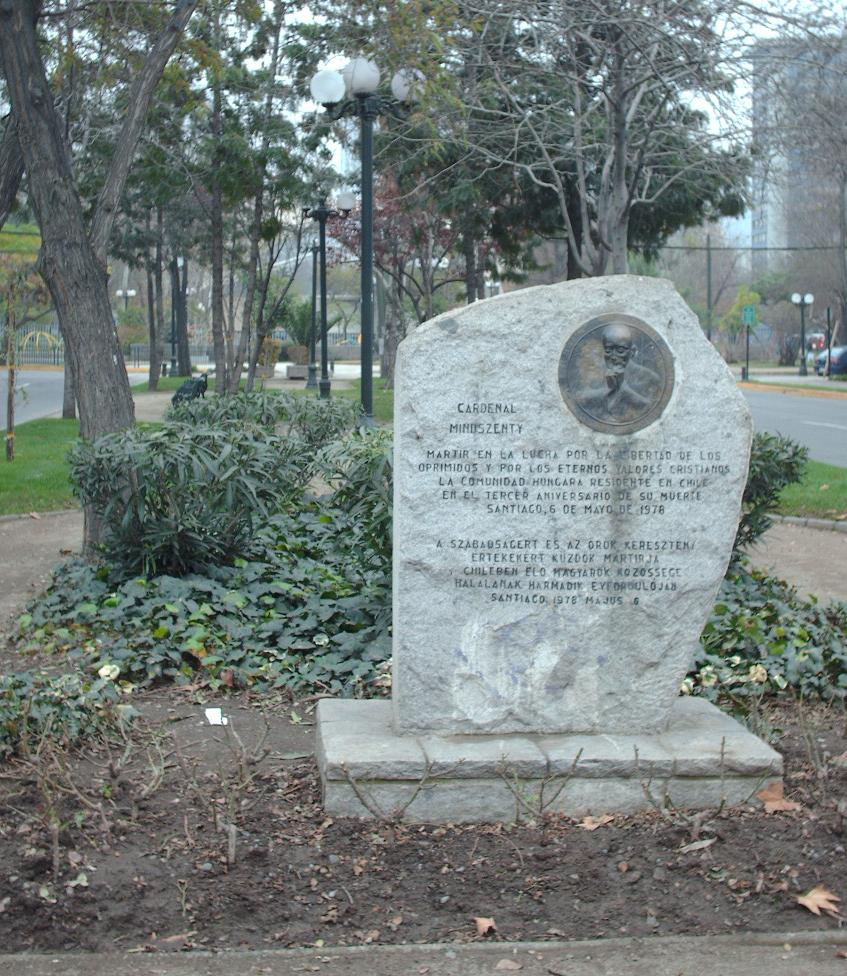
Memorial to Mindszenty in Bustamante Park, Santiago, Chile

Mindszenty's life and battle against the Soviet domination of Hungary and communism were the subject of the 1950 American film Guilty of Treason, partly based on his personal papers and starring Charles Bickford as the cardinal.

The 1955 British thriller The Prisoner is loosely based on Mindszenty's imprisonment, with Alec Guinness playing a fictionalized version of the cardinal.

Mindszenty is reported to have disliked at least one of his film portrayals.

The two-part 1966 episode "Old Man Out" of television's Mission: Impossible was loosely based on Mindszenty. The episode's premise was that a Catholic cardinal, a political prisoner and hero to his people, was slated for execution in an Eastern European prison. The series' protagonists were tasked with smuggling him out of the prison and country before his execution.

== See also ==
- Josef Beran
- John Fisher
- Ignatius Kung Pin-Mei
- Josyf Slipyj
- Alojzije Stepinac
- Stefan Wyszyński
- List of Eastern Bloc defectors
- List of people granted political asylum
- The Black Book of Communism

Catholic Church titles
| Preceded by Gyula Czapik | Bishop of Veszprém; 3 March 1944 – 2 October 1945 | Succeeded by László Bánáss |
| Preceded by Jusztinián György Serédi | Archbishop of Esztergom; 2 October 1945 – 19 December 1973 | Succeeded by László Lékai |
