= St. Michael's Cathedral, Veszprém =

Coordinates: 47.0971°N 17.9028°E

St. Michael's Cathedral Basilica
- Szent Mihály székesegyház
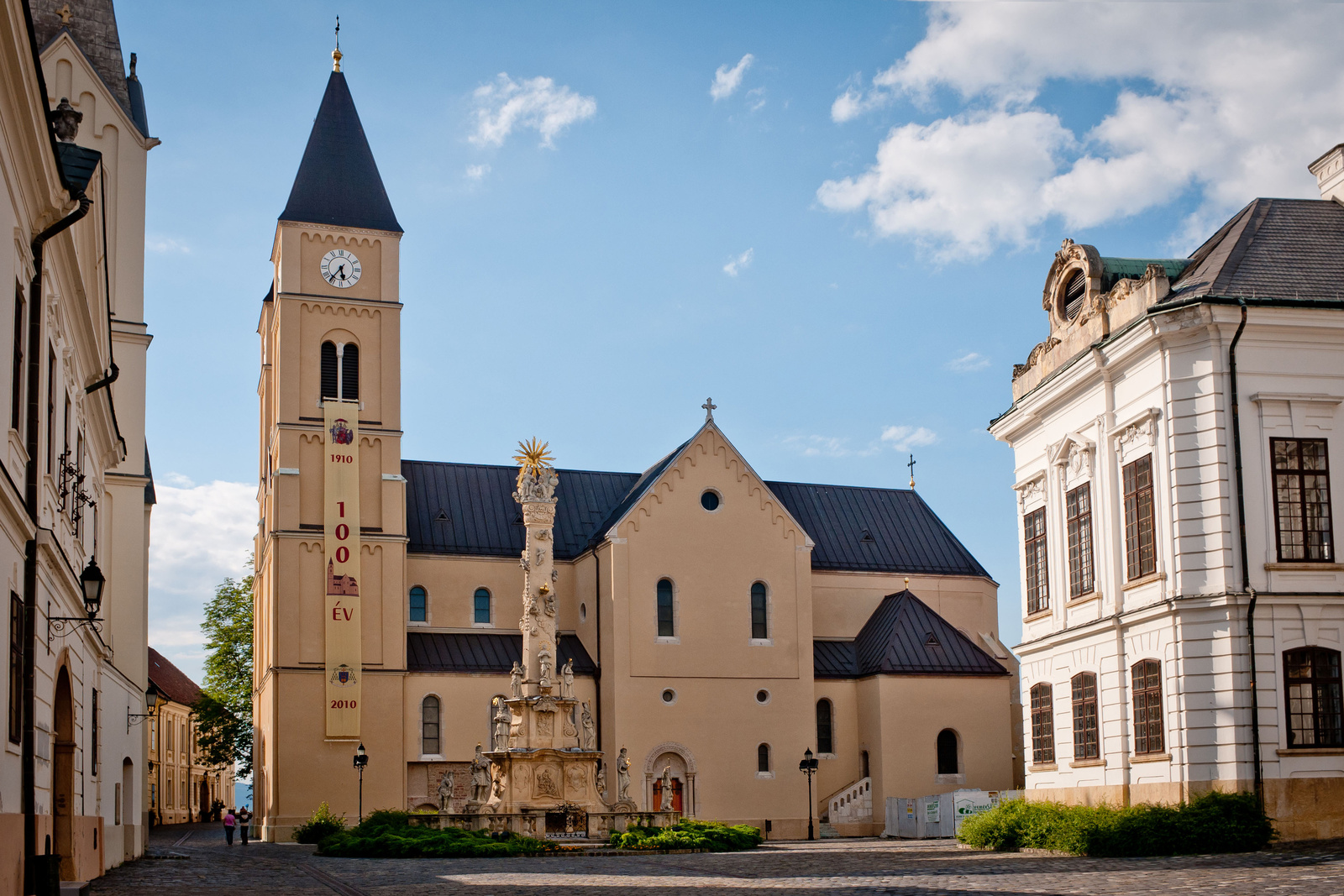
- St. Michael's Cathedral Basilica
- Location: Veszprém
- Country: Hungary
- Denomination: Catholic Church

Administration
- Archdiocese: Veszprém

St. Michael's Cathedral Basilica, (Hungarian: Szent Mihály székesegyház) also called Veszprém Cathedral, is a religious building of the Catholic Church that serves as the cathedral of the Archdiocese of Veszprém and is located in the city of Veszprém, Hungary.

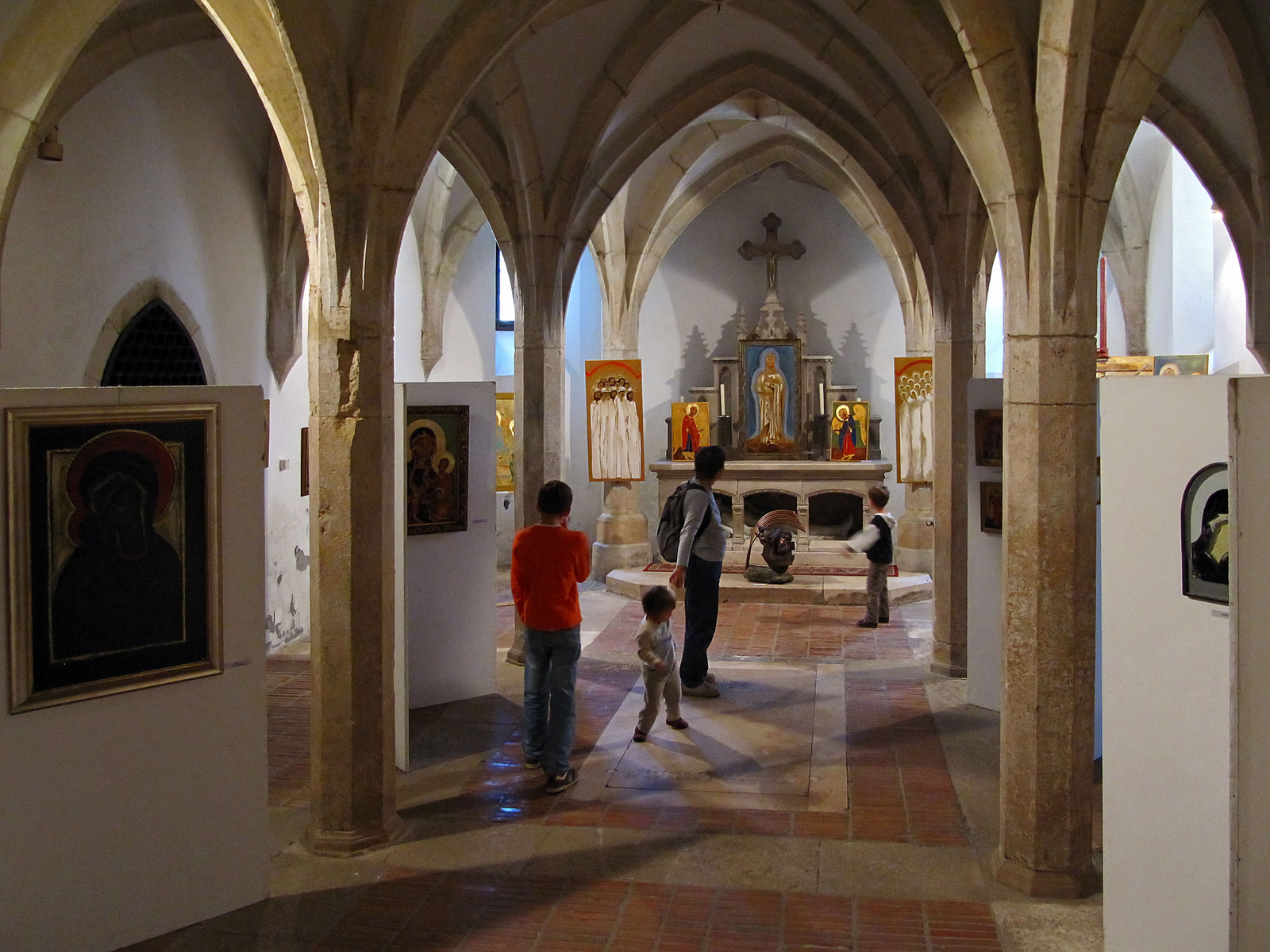
Internal view.

Archaeological findings indicate that in the year 1001, there was already a church on the site. The church is mentioned in documents stored in the Abbey of Pannonhalma. In 1380, after a fire, the cathedral was rebuilt in the Gothic style and dedicated to St. Michael in 1400. Parts of the crypt we see today belong to this period. Later, the building was partially destroyed during the Turkish occupation. In the eighteenth century, the church was restored in the Romanesque and Gothic styles, the surviving baroque elements were eliminated in the restoration of 1907–1910. Between the eighteenth and nineteenth centuries, the cathedral hosted musical events such as concerts of works by European composers such as Mozart, Haydn and Ludwig van Beethoven. In 1981, the cathedral was elevated by Pope John Paul II to the rank of a minor basilica. In 1993, it became the metropolitan cathedral and received from the monastery of Niedernburg the relics of Queen Gisela of Hungary, wife of Stephen I, venerated as blessed by the Catholic church and considered one of the important personalities for the church in that country.

== See also ==
- Roman Catholicism in Hungary
- List of cathedrals in Hungary
