= Gottsegen =

Gottsegen is a surname. Notable people with the surname include:

- György Gottsegen (1906–1965), Hungarian cardiologist
- Robert Gottsegen (1919–2011), American periodontist

== See also ==
- Zack Gottsagen (born 1985), American actor
