= János Zádori =

Hungarian Ecclesiastical writer

János Zádori (6 March 1831 – 30 December 1887) was a Hungarian Ecclesiastical writer.

== Early life and education ==
He was born in Katloez, county of Neutra in Hungary. He studied at the Pazmaneum of the University of Vienna. His favourite branches were modern languages, literature, and the natural sciences. Ordained as a priest in December 1854, he was chaplain at Balassagyarmat for ten years.

From 1864 to the end of his life he taught dogmatic theology at the archiepiscopal seminary at Gran. He was a member of the metropolitan chapter and a domestic prelate of Leo XIII. He declined an appointment to the See of Neusohl. From 1870-1886 he edited the theological magazine "Uj magyar Sion" (New Hungarian Sion).

== Death ==
He died in 1887 in Esztergom.

== Works ==
Thirty-eight of his works have appeared in print, among them some of a devotional character and memorial sermons including one on Count Stephen Széchényi.

His principal works are: A társadolom alapoloci (The fundamental principles of human society), Budapest, 1864 in which he develops the ideas of Lacordaire and others against modern errors.

"Utivázlatok Oloszorszagbol" (Sketches of Italy), Budapest 1867.

A rimai katakombák (The Roman catacombs), with 19 plates, Budapest 1868.

"Spanyol út" (Journey through Spain), Budapest 1868.

IX Pius pápa élete (Life of Pius IX), Gran 1869.

"A Jesus Szive ajtatossázanak története, mivolta, hittani alapja" (The devotion to the Sacred Heart of Jesus, its nature, history, and theological foundation), Gran 1878.

"Szus Mária szeplötelen sivének" (The veneration of the Immaculate Heart of Mary), Gran 1879.

Szent Peter ket levele (The two letters of St. Peter), Budapest, 1881, for which he received great praise from the theological faculty at Gran.

"Syntagma theologiae fundamentalis", Gran 1882 (see "Theol. Quartalschrift", Tübingen, 1887, 691, and Zeitschrift für katholische Theologie, Innsbruck, 1884, 584).
