= Buda Health Center =

Geography
- Location: Budapest, Hungary
- Coordinates: 47.491402°N 19.019553°E

Organisation
- Care system: Private
- Type: Health care

History
- Founded: 2000

Links
- Website: en.bhc.hu%20en.bhc.hu
- Lists: Hospitals in Hungary

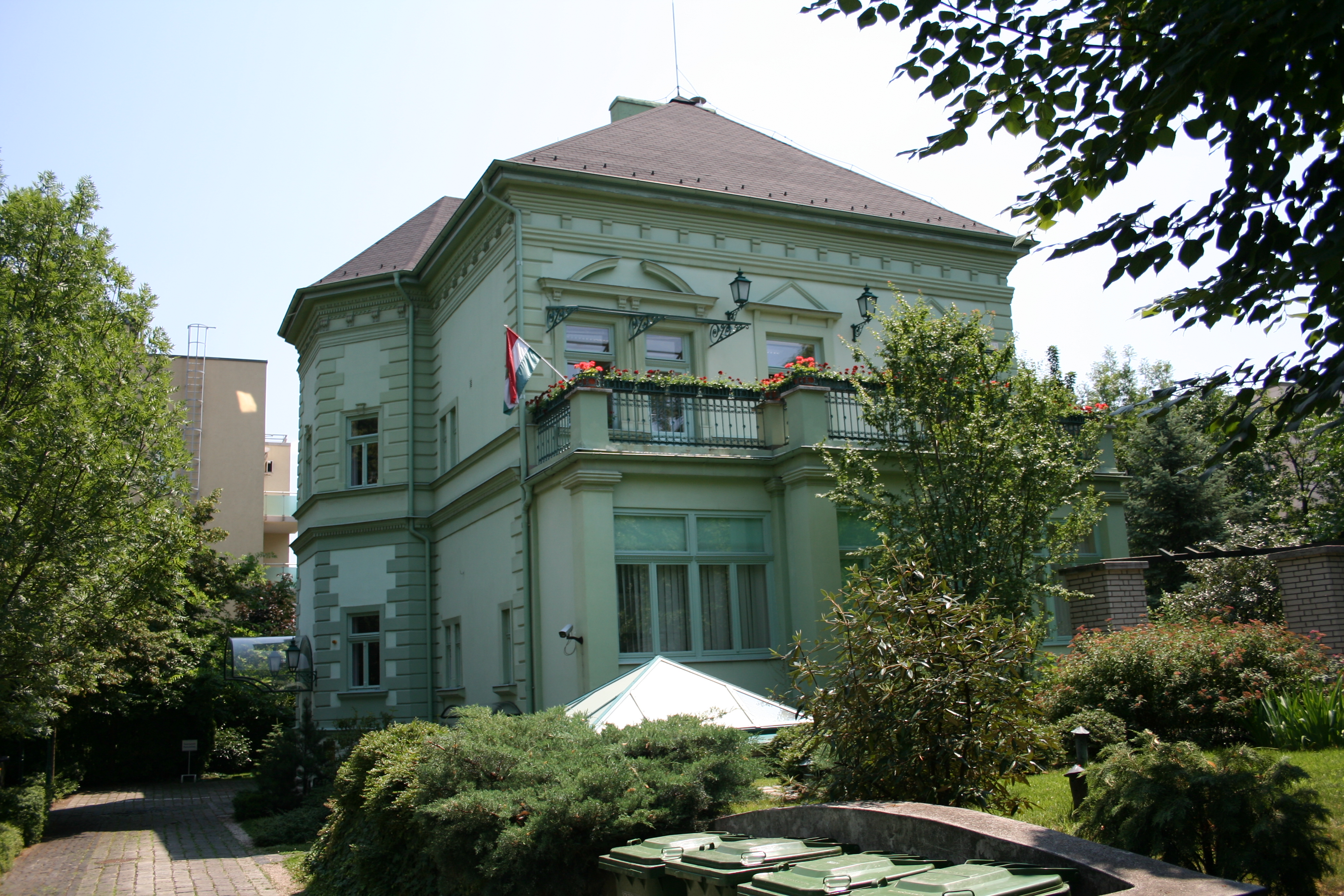
Buda Health Center building, Budapest

The Buda Health Center is a private health clinic in Budapest. Established in 2000, it offers outpatient health care in two locations in the XIIth District, on Nagy Jenő Street and Királyhágó Street, and in one location in the IIIrd District, at the Graphisoft Park. More than 100 physicians in 45 specialties see their private patients in the facility and more than 230 national and multinational companies have contracted with them for their employees’ health care.

The National Center for Spinal Disorders is its affiliate hospital. The hospital also offers publicly financed outpatient care in the areas of musculoskeletal disorders (spine care, orthopedics, traumatology) and anesthesiology as well as inpatient spine care and spine surgery for national and international private patients and patients covered by Hungarian Health Insurance.

In 2006, the Buda Health Center earned 1.7 billion Hungarian Forints mainly from international patients while in 2011, the earnings reached 3 billion. By the middle of 2013, the Buda Health Center had contract agreements with more than 230 national and multinational companies.

== History ==
The Buda Health Center was established by Peter Paul Varga, MD in a villa in Budapest originally the residence of one of the directors of the Hungarian Optical Works. The building served for a time as a kindergarten. In the 1990s, it was occupied by the health clinic of the Postabank, and then in 2000 by the Buda Health Center. The clinic first opened its doors as a private orthopedic clinic, gradually enlarging its portfolio, adding more and more specialties every year. In 2002, screening examinations and the Occupational Health Program were added.

== Psychosocial responsibility ==
The Buda Health Center is committed to promoting the importance of a healthy lifestyle by providing incentives through articles appearing in their blogs, in local publications and on their own website. These articles cover diseases and their possible treatments and also emphasize the importance of daily physical education in the prevention of diseases. The Center takes an active part in the District’s health (Egészséges Hegyvidék) program offering free screening examinations and lectures.

== Quality control ==
The quality of the services provided are controlled and guaranteed by the Hungarian MSZ EN 9001: 2001 standards and the Hungarian Health Care Standards (MEES 1.0).

== Directors ==
The following are directors:

- Peter Paul Varga, MD, Director General, Spine Surgery, Orthopedic Surgery
- Kornel Papik, MD, Administrative Director, Orthopedic Surgery
- Eva Lajos, MD, Medical Director, Private In-Patient Care
- Judit Nagy, MD, Medical Director, Buda Health Center
- Nora Nagy-Laszlo, MD, Occupational Health Program Director
- Ildikó Takács, MD, Director of Diagnostics and Radiology
- Rita Gottgeisl, Financial Director
- Ákos Hazslinszky, Information Technology Director
- Andras Kiss, Director of Marketing and Sales
- Rita Ballai, Director of Patient Services

== Sources ==
- Buda Health Center introduction
- ittlakunk.hu
- Legjobb Magánkórházak cikk (femina.hu – 2009)
