= Jánossy Gallery =

Gallery in Balassagyarmat, Hungary

Coordinates: 48.0764°N 19.2903°E

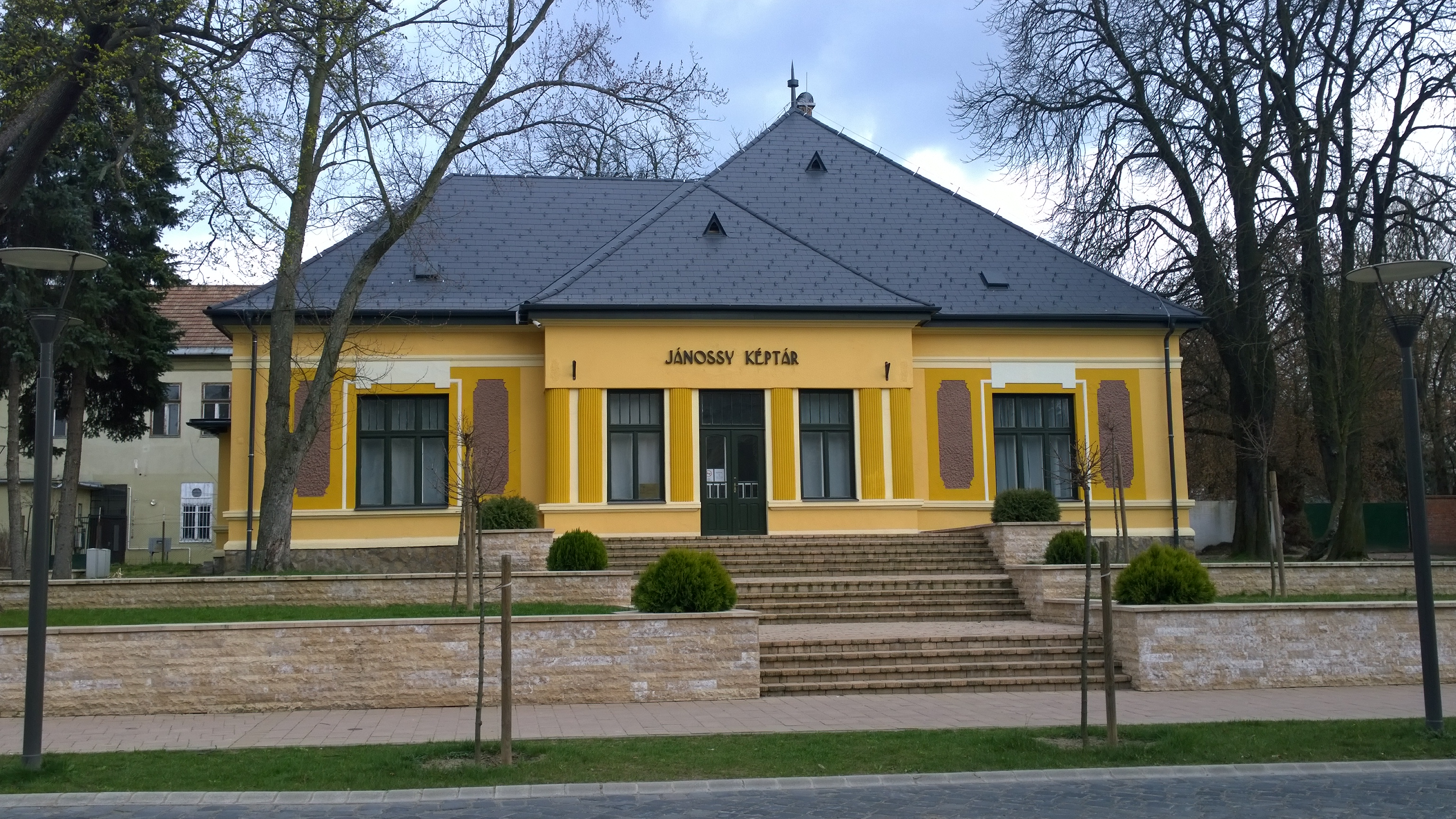
- Established: 1974
- Location: Civitas Fortissima Square, Balassagyarmat
- Director: Zsolt Zolnyánszki
- Website: janossykeptar.hu

The Jánossy Gallery (formerly: Town Gallery Balassagyarmat) is a contemporary gallery in the downtown of Balassagyarmat.

== History ==
The gallery was founded by László Kelemen and István Halmai in 1974. The first exhibition of the gallery opened in the former County Hall on 20 August 1975. The exhibition closed in 1978. The local government reopened the art gallery in 1991 in the former casino building. In 2015 the building was renovated and received the name Jánossy Gallery.

== The building ==
It was built in 1913, by the plans of Dezső Magos, in Art Deco style. From 1945 it was the seat of the local branch of the Hungarian Communist Party, after 1952 the District Library moved here. After the Hungarian Revolution of 1956, the Hungarian Socialist Workers' Party moved into the building. In 1972, the party moved out. The first exhibition opened here in 1991.
