= National Center for Spinal Disorders =

Geography
- Location: Budapest, Hungary
- Coordinates: 47.496342°N 19.022021°E

Organisation
- Type: Specialist

Services
- Specialty: Spinal cord injury

History
- Opened: 1995

Links
- Website: nepegeszsegugyi-egyesulet.hu/en/national-center-spinal-disorders-buda-health-center
- Lists: Hospitals in Hungary

The National Center for Spinal Disorders is a hospital on Királyhágó Street in the 12th District of Budapest, Hungary, financed by the National Health Insurance Fund.

The National Center for Spinal Disorders hosts the yearly Bologna-Budapest International Spine Conference.

== History ==
The National Center for Spinal Disorders was part of the Orthopedic Clinic Department of Spine Surgery and Rehabilitation of the Semmelweis University of Budapest until 1995, when it was incorporated first into the Central Army Hospital and then into the Hungarian National Health Center. It became independent in 2005, under the direction of Peter Paul Varga with charter members. It is operated by the Buda Health Center.

== Facilities ==
The Radiology Department of the National Center for Spinal Disorders has direct digital (ddR) x-ray equipment. The CT/MRI laboratory also contains fast 4-slice CT equipment. The psychosomatic clinic was established in 2010 by Noemi Csaszar and Emoke Bagdy.
