= Salesians in Hungary =

The Salesians of Don Bosco, generally known simply as the Salesians, is the third largest religious institute in the Catholic Church. It has operated in Hungary since 1913, where its clergy established numerous schools. It has a Hungarian province, the institute's smallest province.

== Salesians in Hungary ==
=== Short history of the province ===
The first Salesian priest in Hungary was Károly Zafféry. By the middle of the 20th century, Salesians were present in

- Balassagyarmat
- Borsodnádasd
- Budapest
- Gyula
- Esztergomtábor
- Nyergesújfalu
- Péliföldszentkereszt
- Pestszentlőrinc
- Szombathely
- Újpest

and in other less significance communities.
According to Salesian school entries, in the year 1950, there were 280 Salesian religious in Hungary working in 15 places.
However, the communist government prohibited every religious institute in Hungary. The Salesians had to abandon their work. Although they were officially dismissed, many of the former religious continued to live their sacred life. By the end of the communist regime, only 83 Salesians remained in Hungary to begin working once again in the spirit of Don Bosco: to serve the poor and neglected youth.

== Major Salesian houses in Hungary ==
=== Óbuda - Provincial House and Salesianum Boarding House ===
Foundation: 2001
The Salesians bought the site Bécsi út 173 in 1999. It is the base for the present Provincial House. Its foundation stone was laid down on May 24, 2001. The building was finally completed and blessed on January 1, 2002.
Its functions are currently: Provincial centre, home for Salesian aspirants-, novicess (1999), post-novices and theology students; the Provincial House has a church, the Segítő Szűz Mária church (Mary Help of Christians), located next to the main building.
The Salesianum Boarding House is the part of the main building facing the Bécsi Street. It was originally designed for the provincialate. Later it was used as a boarding house for Catholic male university students.
Address:Szent Alajos Szalézi Rendház 1032 Budapest, Bécsi út 175.
Provincial: P. Manjooran, Simon SDB (since 2010)
Head of the house: P. Andrásfalvy, János SDB

=== Szent Alajos House ===
Foundation: 1920
At the time of the foundation of the house, in Óbuda, the third district of Budapest, this was one of the poorest districts of the capital city. During the Second World War, many Jews and Polish Salesians were sheltered from persecution and deportation in this house. After 1992, when the Salesians regained the most of their former possessions, a general rebuilding and renovating processes started.
On the Bécsi út 175 site (approximately 1000 metres^{2} large). a new house was built. It has 13 rooms, a dining hall, a library, and an auditorium.

=== Péliföldszentkereszt ===
Foundation: 1913
Péliföldszentkereszt (or simply "Szentkereszt") is a widely known place for pilgrimages from the 18th century. The temple's relic is said to contain two little fragments of the cross of Christ (as also its name indicates: "Szent" means holy and "kereszt" means cross). The relic was recently put in a new reliquary.
From November 1913, the church and the monastery of Péliföldszentkereszt was given to the Salesians, as it was abandoned since 1906. The Salesians were also entrusted in 1915 with running the secondary school of the nearby village of Nyergesújfalu.
In 1950, both buildings were nationalized. The pilgrim house became a prison and the monastery itself was made into a hunter's house of the communist Trade Union's.
In 1992, the Salesians got the monastery back with its additional buildings. The Szalézi Irinyi Secondary School was only returned in 2001.
Address:Szalézi Rendház 2533 Bajót Péliföldszentkereszt
Head of the house:P. Ábrahám Béla SDB

=== Szombathely ===
Foundation:1929
Szombathely was the home for the Salesian novices from 1991 until 1999, when the Provincial House took over this function. The Salesian House of Szombathely consists of the Szent Kvirin church, a monastery, the former novitiate house, the oratory building and a theater hall.
Address:Szalézi Rendház 9700 Szombathely, Táncsics Mihály u.44.
Head of the house:P. Csány, Péter SDB

=== Balassagyarmat ===
Foundation:1934
The Salesian house of Balassagyarmat was reorganized(?) from a former barrack of the gendarmerie. After the First World War, in 1924, the barrack became an orphanage. In 1934, the Salesians became entrusted with the building which they renovated and kept running until the end of the Second World War. In 1992, the house was given back to the Salesians and they are still actively present there. The newly renovated Oratory was opened on 20 January 2007.
Address:Bosco Szent János Rendház 2660 Balassagyarmat, Kossuth Lajos u. 41.
Head of the house:P. Baji János SDB

=== Kazincbarcika ===
Foundation:2006
Kazincbarcika was only recently founded in a place, where there were no Salesian presence before. The Kazincbarcika house is an important step in Hungarian missionary work. The vocational school which the Salesians run in Kazincbarcika is mainly concerned in the education of very poor students, who usually belong to a minority of gypsies. But moreless all the youngsters come here after having difficulty at other schools or in the family. There are three Salesians working in Kazincbarcika, their main duty is evangelization within the school, as well as in the neighborhood, where socially disadvantaged families live.
Address:3700 Kazincbarcika, Május 1. út 11.
Head of the House:P. Márkus Zoltán SDB

== Media ==
=== Don Bosco Publisher ===
The Don Bosco Publisher is the property of the Salesian Congregation.
The Publisher is the successor of the "Szalézi Művek" (Salesian Works, if translated) which was closed after 1950. The press restarted its work in 1991, publishing works chiefly on Salesian mission and education.
Address:Don Bosco Kiadó Bt. Könyvesbolt 1053 Budapest, Múzeum körút 7.
