= Dezső Magos (Munk) =

Hungarian architect (1884–1944)

- Born: 1 March 1884; Balassagyarmat, Hungary
- Died: 10 June 1944 (aged 60); Aszód, Hungary

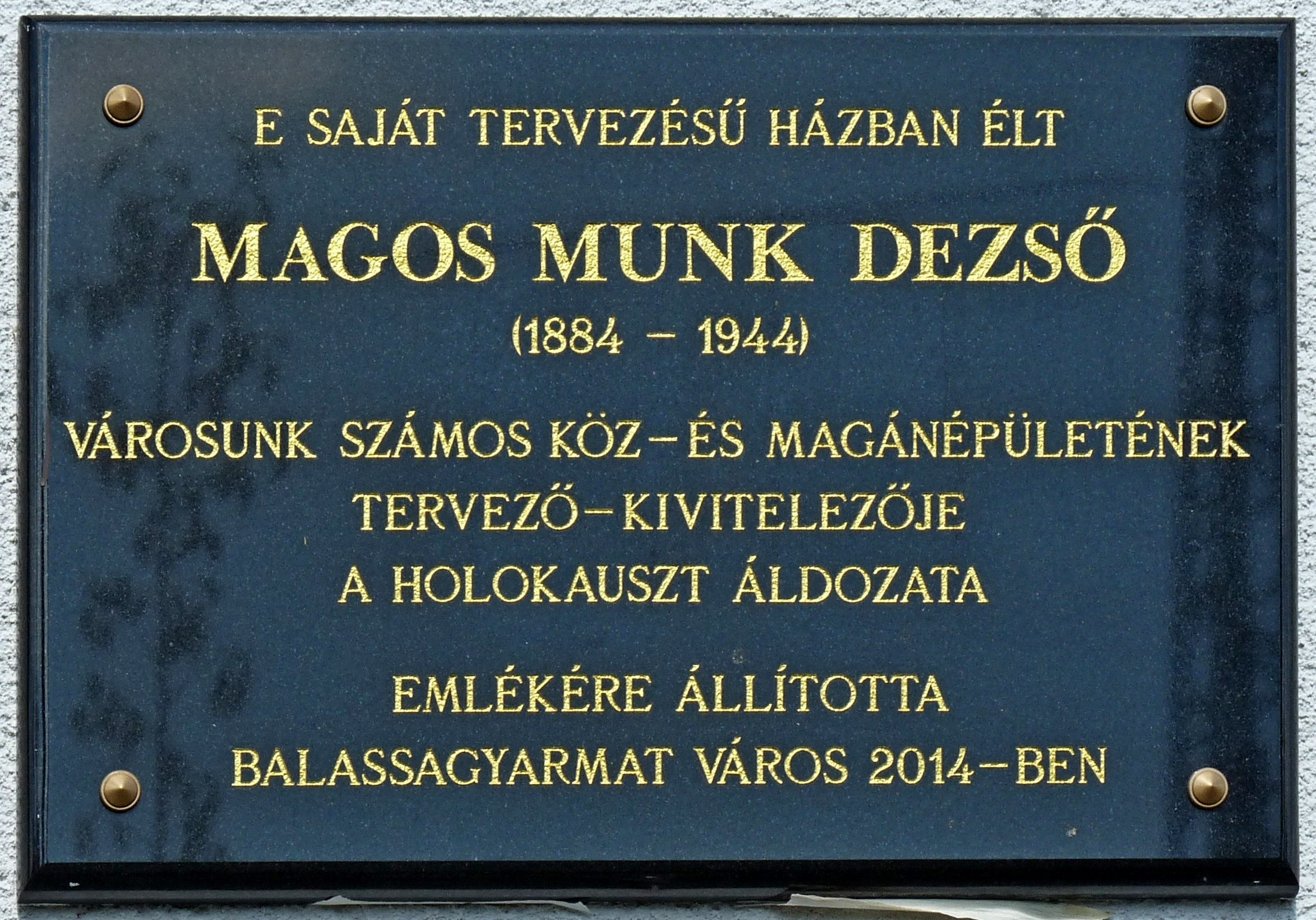
Commemorative plaque to Mr. Dezső Magos (Munk) (1884-1944)

Dezső Magos (1 March 1884 – 10 June 1944) was a Jewish-Hungarian architect. He was born in Balassagyarmat, in what is now Hungary.

== Life ==
His parents were Adolf Munk and Rezi Strassburger.

In 1913, Magos graduated as an architect. Some of his most notable works include the town beach and flag of the Ipoly-Region. He is credited with designing the first church of Salesian Order in Hungary, the construction of the city hall, the expansion of the hospital, the construction of the Women's Psychiatric Ward, the Casino, the Police Department, the Gendarmerie, the Palace of Finance, the Roman Catholic parsonage, the slaughterhouse and a pedestrian bridge on the river Ipoly.

In 1930, he became a member of the Chamber of Engineers.

Magos built several military structures for the Hungarian Defence Force between the two World Wars to the satisfaction of the Supreme Command. That included the barracks in Rétság and Pétervására and the fortresses of the "Árpád Line" in the Carpathian mountains near Kőrösmező (today: Jasyna, Ukraine). Because of his social sensitivity and generous financial support, he was recognized throughout the city. This generosity was demonstrated by young intellectuals who were employed in his companies; one of whom was Zoltán Réti, a prominent painter and conductor.

In the 1920s he was baptized. Pál Baross, Magos' godfather and the central head of Nógrád County, appointed József Baross to be deputy head. József became central head in 1919 and later mayor of Budapest. From the early 1940s, he gained prominence with his anti-Nazi publications. For this reason, he was arrested on 16 October 1944, by the Arrow Cross and later executed in Dachau concentration camp.

József Baross took on the "protection" of Dezső Magos, one of his favorite card partners. Magos wore a yellow star so he could walk free and was exempted from confinement in the ghetto.

Despite Magos' baptism, he was deported, gained protection and lived free. He died on 10 June 1944, in Aszód as he was deported with the Jewish community. He committed suicide when the group reached Aszód.

== Works ==
- Közvágóhíd és jéggyár
- Új plébánia és Magyar Korona Gyógyszertár
- Jánossy Gallery
- Munk-ház
- Balassagyarmati Városháza
- Államrendőrségi és Csendőrségi Palota
- Bosco Szt. János Szalézi Intézet - Szalézi Templom
- Balassagyarmati strandfürdő
- A romhányi csata emlékműve
- Ipolymenti országzászló
- Kazár, az I. világháborús hősök emlékműve
- Rétsági laktanya
- Pétervásárai laktanya
- Az Árpád vonal létesítményei

== Legacy ==
He was discussed in various publications, including:

- "Bela Majdan: In a small town in Hungary architectural monuments". Balassagyarmat, 1989.
- Mohácsy, Laszlo. Balassagyarmati contemporaries. Ernő Kondor, Dezső Magos (Munk), Michel Gyarmathy, Máriery Sári. Balassagyarmat Honismereti Híradó 1999 p. 84-86.
- Soos, Geza : "Architect serving the city". Ipoly Messenger, 1. 5 October 1999.
- Kubiczek, Elizabeth: "Born 120 years Magos (Munk) Dezso, our town renowned architect engineer. Disruption of a family." Balassagyarmat Honismereti Híradó 2004 p. 178-181.
- Majdán, Bela: "Balassagyarmat Jewish community memory." István Kertész Foundation, Jewish Jewish Community of Balassagyarmat, Balassagyarmat, 2004 p. 52-55.
- "Angela destroy them allied with hate, love tribute to them. The memory of the Holocaust."
- Zonda, Tamás: Balassagyarmat Prominent citizens. Balassagyarmat - Budapest, 2011. p. 202-203.
- Nagy, Laszlo: "It could have been different, too? Browse the plans of the Palóc Museum and the City Hall"
- (Yechiel) Core (work) Desi (1884-1944).
- Angela: "It was built dr. Albert Kenessey's Board, Nógrád County in Valéria's Public Hospital, Balassagyarmat".
- Angela: "In memoriam Magos (Munk) Desi (1884-1944), an architect". (www.balassagyarmat.eu)

== Personal life ==
Magos died on 10 June 1944, in Aszód, Hungary.
