= List of hospitals in Hungary =

Here is a list of hospitals in Hungary.

== Central Hungary ==
=== Budapest ===
Name	English translation	Type
Állami Egészségügyi Központ - Magyar Honvédség Központi Kórháza	State Medical Centre - Central Hospital of the Hungarian Homeland Defence Forces	Public
Árpád Kórház	Árpád Hospital	Public
Bajcsy-Zsilinszky Kórház	Bajcsy-Zsilinszky Hospital	Public
Bethesda Gyermekkórház	Bethesda Children's Hospital	Church
Gottsegen György Országos Kardiológia Intézet	György Gottsegen National Cardiological Institute	Public
Heim Pál Gyermekkórház	Pál Heim Children's Hospital	Public
Honvédkórház	"Homeland Defence" Hospitals	Public
Károlyi Kórház	Károlyi Hospital	Public
Jáhn Ferenc Kórház	Ferenc Jáhn Hospital	Public
MÁV Kórház	HSR Hospitals	Public
Merényi Gusztáv Kórház	Gusztáv Merényi Hospital	Public
Nyírő Gyula Kórház - Országos Pszichiátriai és Addiktológiai Intézet	Gyula Nyírő Hospital - National Psychiatrical and Addictological Institute	Public
Országos Korányi Tbc és Pulmonológiai Intézet	National Korányi Tbc and Pulmonological Institute	Public
Országos Onkológiai Intézet	National Oncological Institute	Public
Országos Orvosi Rehabilitációs Intézet	National Medical Rehabilitative Institute	Public
Országos Sportegészségügyi Intézet (Sportkórház)	National Sports Medical Institute (Sports Hospital)	Public
Péterfy Sándor utcai Kórház és Baleseti Központ	Sándor Péterfy street Hospital and Casualty Centre	Public
Szent Ferenc Kórház	Saint Francis Hospital	Catholic Church
Szent Imre Kórház	Saint Emeric Hospital	Public
Szent István Kórház	Saint Stephen Hospital	Public
Szent János Kórház	Saint John Hospital	Public
Szent László Kórház	Saint Ladislaus Hospital	Public
Szent Margit Kórház	Saint Margaret Hospital	Public
Szent Rókus Kórház	Saint Roch Hospital	Public
SE Klinikák	SU Clinics	Public
Uzsoki Kórház	Uzsoki Hospital	Public

=== Pest County ===
City	Name	English translation	Type
Cegléd	Toldy Ferenc Kórház	Ferenc Toldy Hospital	Public
Kistarcsa	Flór Ferenc Kórház	Ferenc Flór Hospital	Public
Telki	Telki Kórház	Telki Hospital	Private
Vác	Jávorszky Ödön Kórház	Ödön Jávorszky Hospital	Public

== Western Transdanubia ==
City	Name	English	Type
Celldömölk	Kemenesaljai Egyesített Kórház	Kemenesalja Joint Hospital	Public
Győr	Petz Aladár Kórház	Aladár Petz Hospital	Public
Hévíz	Szent András Reumakórház	Saint Andrew Rheumatics Hospital	Public
Keszthely	Városi Kórház	Municipal Hospital	Public
Körmend	Batthyány-Strattmann László Kórház	László Batthyány-Strattmann Hospital	Public
Mosonmagyaróvár	Karolina Kórház	Karolina Hospital	Public
Nagykanizsa	Városi Kórház	Municipal Hospital	Public
Sopron	Erzsébet Kórház	Erzsébet Hospital	Public
Szentgotthárd	Megyei Rehabilitációs Kórház	County Rehabilitative Hospital	Public
Szombathely	Markusovszky Lajos Kórház	Lajos Markusovszky Hospital	Public
Zalaegerszeg	Zala Megyei Kórház	Zala County Hospital	Public

== Central Transdanubia ==
City	Name	English translation	Type
Ajka	Városi Kórház	Municipal Hospital	Public
Balatonfüred	Állami Szívkórház	State Heart Hospital	Public
Keszthely	Városi Kórház	Municipal Hospital	Public
Dunaújváros	Szent Pantaleon Kórház	Saint Pantaleon Hospital	Public
Esztergom	Vaszary Kolos Kórház	Kolos Vaszary Hospital	Public
Komárom	Selye János Kórház	János Selye Hospital	Public
Mór	Városi Kórház	Municipal Hospital	Public
Pápa	Esterházy Károly Kórház	Károly Esterházy Hospital	Public
Székesfehérvár	Szent György Kórház	Saint George Hospital	Public
Tapolca	Deák Jenő Kórház	Jenő Deák Hospital	Public
Tatabánya	Szent Borbála Kórház	Saint Barbara Hospital	Public
Veszprém	Cholnoky Ferenc Kórház	Ferenc Cholnoky Hospital	Public
Zirc	Városi Erzsébet Kórház	Municipal Erzsébet Hospital	Public

== Southern Transdanubia ==
City	Name	English translation	Type
Dombóvár	Szent Lukács Kórház	Saint Luke Hospital	Public
Kaposvár	Kaposi Mór Kórház	Mór Kaposi Hospital	Public
Mohács	Városi Kórház	Municipal Hospital	Public
Pécs	PTE Klinikák	University of Pécs Clinics	Public
Pécs	Baranya Megyei Kórház	Baranya County Hospital	Public
Pécs	Honvédkórház	"Homeland Defence" Hospitals	Public
Siófok	Városi Kórház	Municipal Hospital	Public
Szigetvár	Városi Kórház	Municipal Hospital	Public
Szekszárd	Balassa János Kórház	János Balassa Hospital	Public

== Northern Hungary ==
City	Name	English translation	Type
Balassagyarmat	Kenessey Albert Kórház	Albert Kenessey Hospital	Public
Edelény	Koch Róbert Kórház	Robert Koch Hospital	Public
Eger	Markoth Ferenc Kórház	Ferenc Markoth Hospital	Public
Gyöngyös	Bugát Pál Kórház	Pál Bugát Hospital	Public
Hatvan	Városi Kórház	Municipal Hospital	Public
Kazincbarcika	Városi Kórház	Municipal Hospital	Public
Mezőkövesd	Mozgásszervi Rehabilitációs Központ	Locomotion Disease Rehabilitative Centre	Public
Miskolc	Borsod-Abaúj-Zemplén Megyei Kórház	Borsod-Abaúj-Zemplén County Hospital	Public
Miskolc	Semmelweis Kórház	Semmelweis Hospital	Public
Miskolc	Szent Ferenc Kórház	Saint Francis Hospital	Public
Ózd	Almási Balogh Pál Kórház	Pál Almási Balogh Hospital	Public
Pásztó	Margit Kórház	Margit Hospital	Public
Salgótarján	Szent Lázár Kórház	Saint Lazarus Hospital	Public
Sátoraljaújhely	Erzsébet Kórház	Erzsébet Hospital	Public

== Northern Great Plain ==
City	Name	English translation	Type
Berettyóújfalu	Tisza István Kórház	István Tisza Hospital	Public
Debrecen	Kenézy Gyula Kórház	Gyula Kenézy Hospital	Public
Debrecen	Debreceni Egyetemi Klinikák	University of Debrecen Clinics	Public
Jászberény	Erzsébet Kórház	Erzsébet Hospital	Public
Karcag	Kátai Gábor Kórház	Gábor Kátai Hospital	Public
Kisvárda	Felső-Szabolcsi Kórház	Upper Szabolcs Hospital	Public
Mátészalka	Városi Kórház	Municipal Hospital	Public
Nyíregyháza	Jósa András Kórház	András Jósa Hospital	Public
Szolnok	Hetényi Géza Kórház	Géza Hetényi Hospital	Public
Szolnok	MÁV Kórház	HSR Hospitals	Public

== Southern Great Plain ==
City	Name	English translation	Type
Baja	Szent Rókus Kórház	Saint Roch Hospital	Public
Békéscsaba	Réthy Pál Kórház	Pál Réthy Hospital	Public
Gyula	Pándy Kálmán Kórház	Kálmán Pándy Hospital	Public
Hódmezővásárhely	Erzsébet Kórház	Erzsébet Hospital	Public
Kalocsa	Szent Kereszt Kórház	Holy Cross Hospital	Public
Kecskemét	Bács-Kiskun Megyei Kórház	Bács-Kiskun County Hospital	Public
Kecskemét	Kecskeméti Repülőkórház	Kecskemét Aviation Hospital	Public
Kiskunhalas	Semmelweis Kórház	Semmelweis Hospital	Public
Kiskunfélegyháza	Városi Kórház	Municipal Hospital	Public
Makó	Diósszilágyi Sámuel Kórház	Sámuel Diósszilágyi Hospital	Public
Orosháza	Városi Kórház	Municipal Hospital	Public
Szeged	Szent-Györgyi Albert Klinikai Központ	Albert Szent-Györgyi Clinical Centre	Public
Szentes	Bugyi István Kórház	István Bugyi Hospital	Public

== See also ==
- Healthcare in Hungary
