= Healthcare in Hungary =

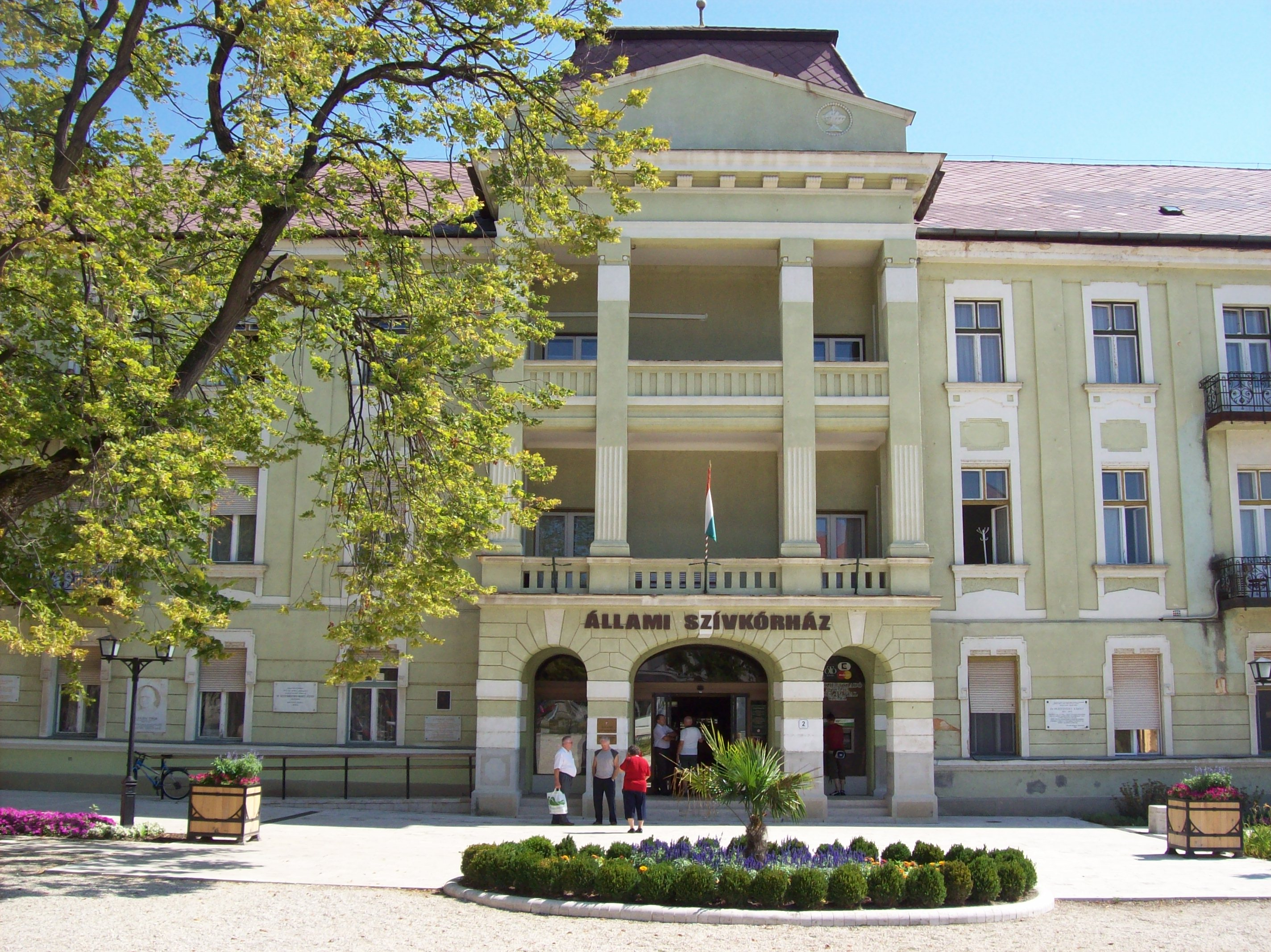
Állami Szívkórház ("State Heart Hospital") in Balatonfüred, resort town by Lake Balaton

Hungary has a tax-funded universal healthcare system organized by the state-owned National Health Insurance Fund (Hungarian: Nemzeti Egészségbiztosítási Alapkezelő (NEAK)). While healthcare is considered universal, several reasons persist to prevent Hungarian nationals from accessing healthcare services. For instance, a Hungarian citizen who lived abroad but is unable to show contributions to another country's healthcare system will not be able to access the Hungarian healthcare system free of charge. However, to the OECD, 100% of the total population is covered by universal health insurance, which is absolutely free for children (all people under 16), mothers or fathers with babies, students, pensioners (everyone over 64), people with low income, handicapped people (including those with physical and mental disorders), priests, and other church employees. In 2022, the cost of public health insurance was 8,400 HUF per month (280 HUF/day), which is the equivalent of $23.69. The healthcare system underwent significant changes which also resulted in improving life expectancy (7.48 years for men and 4.92 years for women between 1993 and 2013) and a very low infant mortality rate (4.6 per 1,000 live births in 2014). According to the OECD, Hungary spent 7.8% of its GDP on health care in 2012. Total health expenditure was $1,688.7 per capita in 2011: $1,098.30 governmental-funded (65%) and $590.40 private-funded (35%).

Doctors' pay is the lowest among the OECD countries. General practitioners are paid 1.4 times the average wage and hospital specialists 1.6 times. A 2026 opinion poll showed low satisfaction with the health care system in Hungary.

== History ==
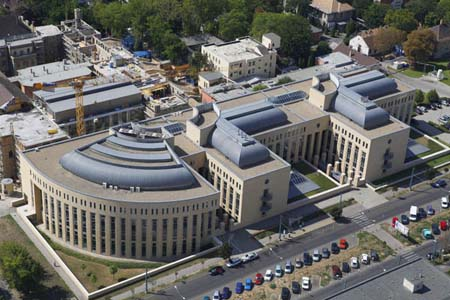
Uzsoki Hospital, Budapest

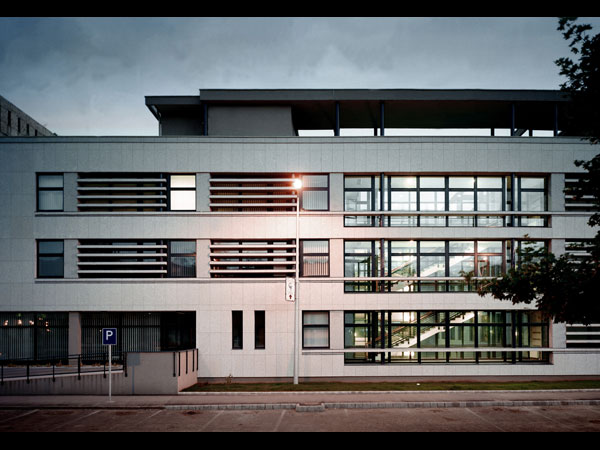
Center of Cardiology and Heart Surgery in Pécs

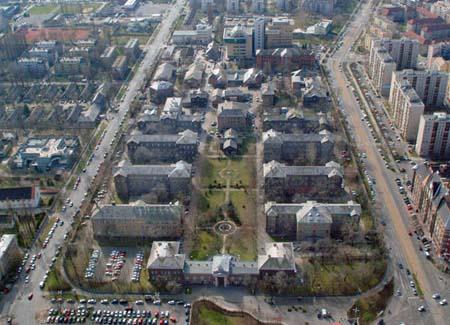
Szent István Kórház (Saint Stephen Hospital) at Üllői Avenue, Budapest. With Szent László Kórház (Saint Ladislaus Hospital) making the largest hospital complex in Hungary, built at the turn of the 19th and 20th century.

The first hospitals go back to the 13th-century mining towns of Hungary. The first mining health insurance was founded by János Thurzó in 1496. The first modern insurer was established in 1907, named Országos Munkásbetegsegélyező és Balesetbiztosító Pénztár ("National Workers' Sick-benefit and Accident Fund").

The first steps to overall health insurance took place in the Horthy era with the creation of Országos Társadalombiztosítási Intézet (lit. "National Social Insurance Institution") in 1928 (This is the predecessor of present-day Országos Egészségbiztosítási Pénztár.). Social services were complete by 1938, at that time the Hungarian social health insurance system was the most progressive and charitable in East-Central Europe.

After World War II the Communist government fully nationalized social insurance. Since then the Hungarian healthcare system has been state-owned, overall, and available to all people.

The free-market shift initiated after the end of communist rule in 1989-1990 put a strain on the largely centralized, wholly tax-funded public health system, which required far-reaching reforms. These resulted in the creation of the National Healthcare Fund (Hungarian: Országos Egészségbiztosítási Pénztár), in 1993. The OEP, predominantly based on a social insurance system, is the public organization currently controlling the management of health care in Hungary. 83% of the financing for health care comes from taxes and other public revenues.

Participation in the insurance scheme is mandatory for everyone in the workforce, including the self-employed. Most private hospitals also operate under the OEP framework. Because of past hiring policies, Hungarian hospitals often have redundancies of doctors, and a lack of nurses, resulting in an unproductive misuse of human resources.

So-called "gratitude payments", another communist legacy, require in practice a cash payment to have access to better treatments. According to the survey conducted by the Euro health consumer index in 2015 Hungary was among the European countries in which unofficial payments to doctors were reported most commonly. In 2020 the government announced a crackdown on these payments along with an unprecedented pay rise for doctors.

Medical treatment deemed "medically necessary" is provided free of charge for European citizens in the country.

== Infrastructure ==
As a high-income nation, Hungary has a relatively developed health infrastructure. Ambulances of the Országos Mentőszolgálat (OMSZ, "National Ambulance Service") reach all over the country within 15 minutes at the very latest. In 2013 OMSZ built 20 new ambulance stations and renewed 60 others with the purchase of 200 new ambulances.

Air ambulance service was completed in 2009 with the grand opening of Szentes air ambulance station. Air ambulance bases (in Budaörs, Balatonfüred, Sármellék, Pécs, Szentes, Debrecen, Miskolc) cover the whole country. Helicopters can reach 85% of the country's territory within 15 minutes at the very latest. All national and county hospitals have heliports, including the specialized and most professional university clinics and emergency centers in Budapest, Pécs, Szeged, and Debrecen.

== Medical tourism ==
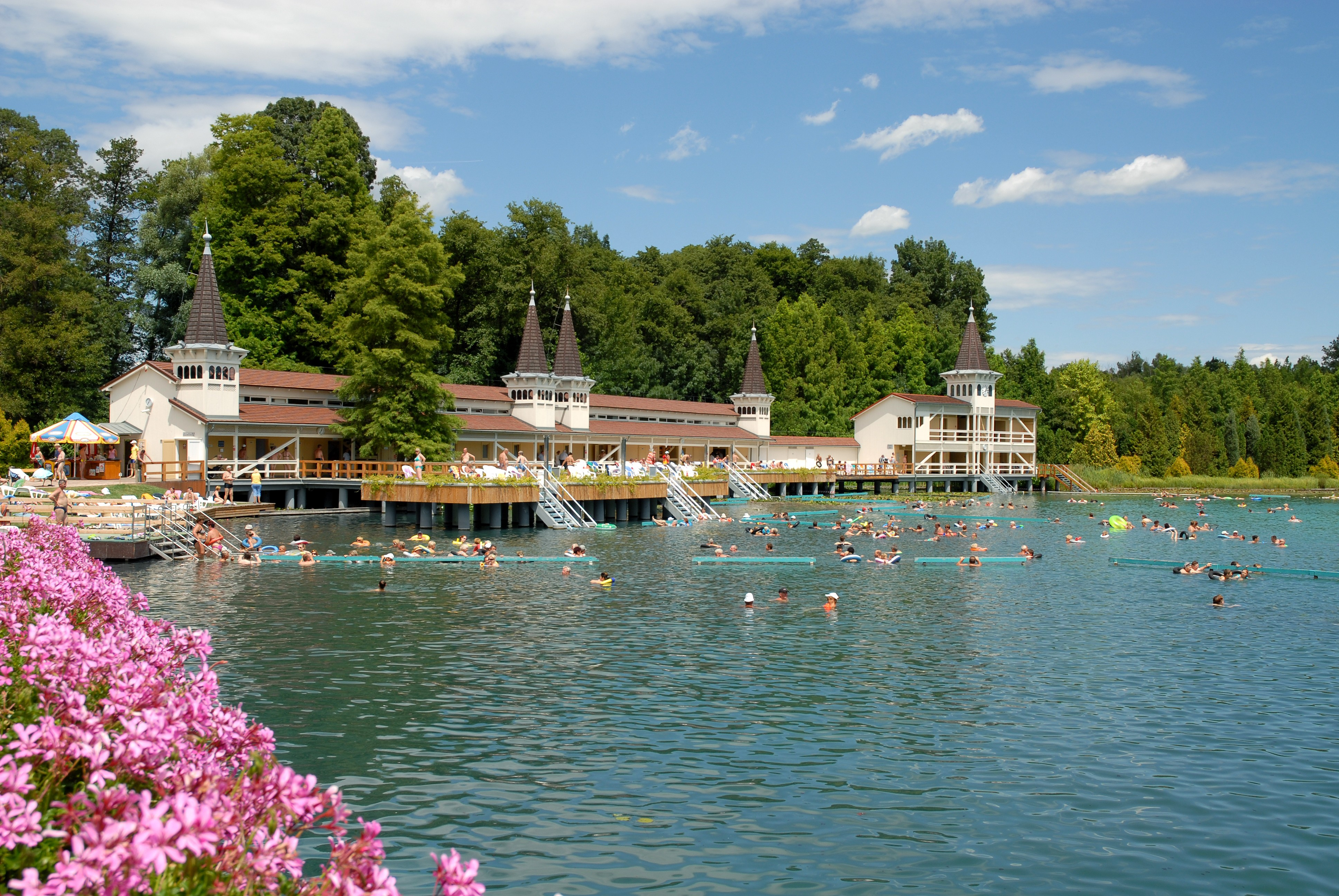
Lake Hévíz, the second largest thermal lake in the world.

Hungary is one of the main destinations of medical tourism in Europe. The country leads in dental tourism, its share is 42% in Europe and 21% worldwide. The first medical tourists were Germans and Austrians in the 1980s, looking for cheap and top-quality dentistry services. Since the fall of Communism medical tourism is an emerging business, 60,000-70,000 people visit Hungary for dental treatments every year, earning 65–70 billion Hungarian forint (~$US325–350 million) for the dental sector alone. The cost of medical treatments is between 40% and 70% of the cost in the United Kingdom, United States, and Scandinavia. The most popular medical treatments are dentistry, cosmetic surgery, orthopedic surgery, cardiac rehabilitation, fertility treatment, dermatology, anti-aging treatment, obesity treatment, addiction programs,, and eye surgery. Plastic surgery is also a key sector, and 30% of clients come from abroad and can save 40-80% on medical expenses. Hungary is home to several medicinal spas (Lake Hévíz, Széchenyi Medicinal Bath etc.), and spa tourism is sometimes combined with other treatments.

== See also ==
- Health in Hungary
- Hungarian Food Safety Office
- Hungarian fees abolishment referendum, 2008
- List of hospitals in Hungary
