= Maier Zipser =

Hungarian Rabbi (1815–1869)

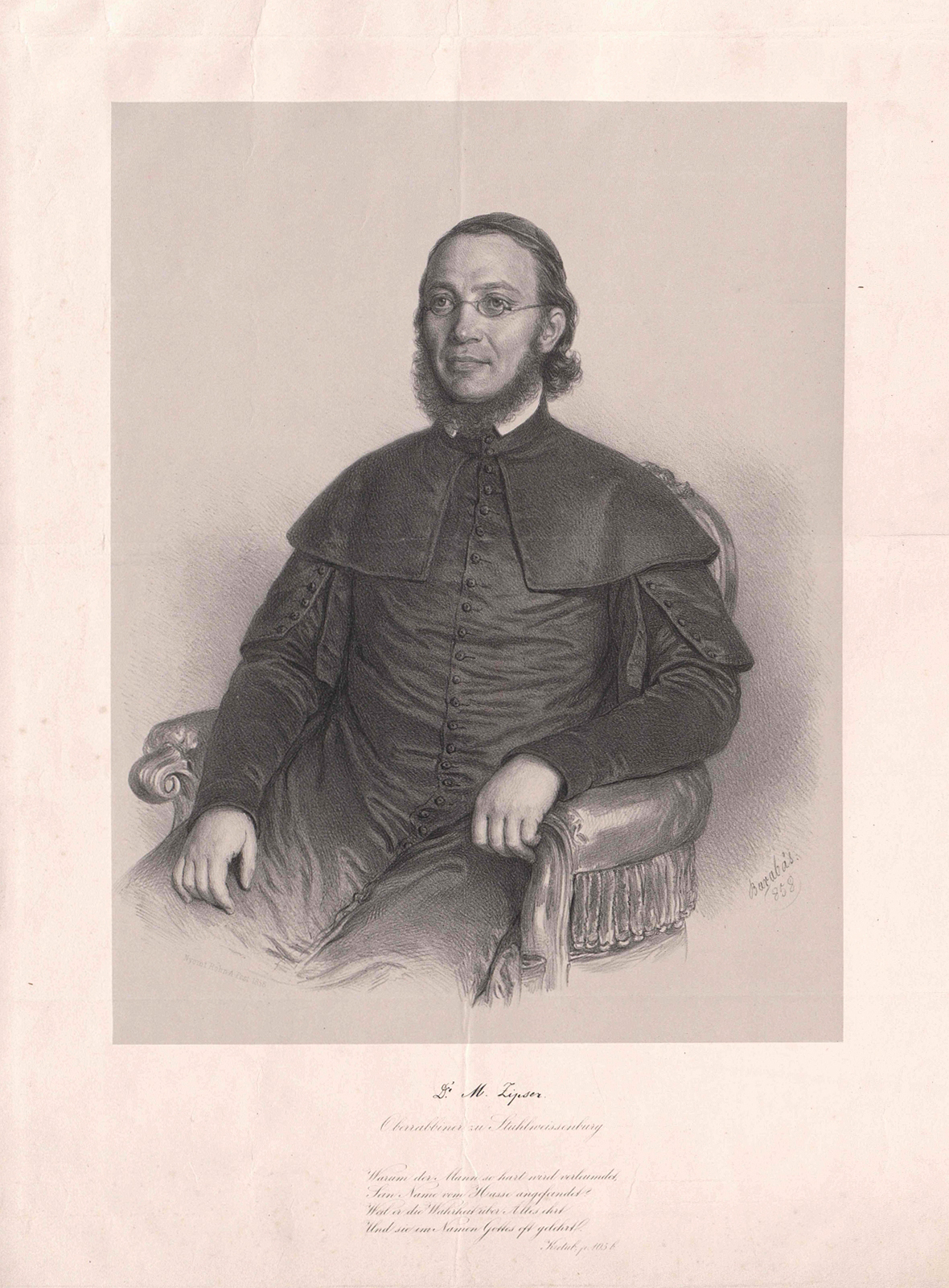
- Born: 14 August 1815; Balassagyarmat
- Died: 10 December 1869 (aged 54); Rechnitz

Maier Zipser (14 August 1815–10 December 1869) was a Hungarian rabbi. He studied in various yeshibot, among his teachers being Wolf Boskowitz and Maier Eisenstadt; and he acquired a secular education partly through the assistance of Löw Schwab and partly through his own endeavors. In 1844 he was chosen rabbi at Stuhlweissenburg, where, however, he became involved in a controversy with the Orthodox members of the community on account of a divorce which he had granted without a precedent. In his defense he wrote a pamphlet titled Me ha-Shiloaḥ: Rabbinisches Gutachten über Jüdische Ehescheidung (Budapest, 1853). About 1850 he went to England, where he published a pamphlet titled The Sermon on the Mount, defending Judaism against the parliamentary speeches of Inglis (London, 1852). In 1858 Zipser was elected rabbi of Rechnitz, and he held this position until his death. In addition to the two pamphlets already mentioned, he published various sermons and made numerous contributions to the Jewish press, especially to the Orient, the Allgemeine Zeitung des Judenthums, and the Neuzeit, winning the reputation of being one of the most scholarly Hungarian rabbis of his day.
