= György Gottsegen =

Hungarian physician (1906-1965)

- Born: 18 June 1906; Budapest, Austria-Hungary
- Died: 7 May 1965 (aged 58); Dubrovnik, Yugoslavia
- Education: University of Vienna
- Scientific career
- Fields: Cardiology

György Gottsegen (18 June 1906 – 7 May 1965) was a Hungarian physician, founder of the National Cardiological Institute (Hungarian: Országos Kardiológiai Intézet).

== Life ==
He was born in Budapest, Hungary (then Austria-Hungary), and studied in Paris and graduated in Vienna in 1929. After graduation he worked in Wenckenbach Clinic (Vienna), later in Darmstadt, Germany and Ratibor (then Germany, now Poland). Gottsegen returned to Hungary in 1931, he was the director of the Jewish Hospital in Budapest until 1944. He was the director of the National Health Insurance Institute (Hungarian: Országos Társadalombiztosítási Intézet) from 1945 to 1950, director of Szent Imre Hospital and Szent István Hospital until 1957.

After his lobbying a new cardiological institute was established in 1957. The first heart surgery in the National Cardological Institute was held in December 1957. He became an academic in 1959, Doctor of Science in 1962. Gottsegen died in Dubrovnik (then Yugoslavia, now Croatia) during a conference and was buried in Farkasréti Cemetery, Budapest.

== Publications ==
- A szívbetegségek vizsgálatáról és kezeléséről ("Research of heart disease and treatments") (Budapest, 1929)
- Szívbetegségek ("Heart disease") (Budapest, 1961)

== Legacy ==
The National Cardiological Institute (established by himself) was named after him in 1997.

== See also ==
- List of hospitals in Hungary
