= Albert Kenessey =

Dr. Albert Kenessey (born April 22, 1889, in Budapest; died January 31, 1973) was Surgeon-in-Chief and Director of the City Hospital of Balassagyarmat in Hungary, which now bears his name. He was an Honorary Freeman of the city of Balassagyarmat and a recipient of the Gold Medal of the Order of Labour of the Hungarian State.

== Early life and education ==
Kenessey (full name in Hungarian: kenesei Kenessey Albert László; in English: Albert László Kenessey de Kenese) was born on 27 April 1889 in Budapest as the second child, first son of Béla Kenessey and Ilona Vágfalvy. When he was 5 years old his father was appointed rector of the Theological University in the then-Hungarian city of Kolozsvár (after 1918 Cluj in Romania, since 1974 Cluj-Napoca), so the family moved to Transylvania (in 1910 Kenessey's father was to become bishop of Transylvania). In 1900 Kenessey's mother died, and he and his sister were raised by their grandmother, an exceptionally strict and demanding woman.

After gymnasium Albert Kenessey began his study of medicine at the University of Kolozsvár. He wrote his doctoral thesis on animal studies of vascular surgery with Prof. Kálmán Buday as supervisor. On May 2, 1913, he was awarded his doctorate, "sub auspicis regis", under the patronage of the king. This indicated that from the first year of elementary school until the last examination at the university he always received the best possible marks. In recognition of this, the minister of culture and sciences, Béla Jankovics, presented him with a ring showing the letters FJ and a crown set in diamonds on blue enamel and surrounded with diamonds (FJ stood for Franz Joseph, Emperor of Austria and King of Hungary in the Austro-Hungarian monarchy). In connection with this, the young Kenessey was expected to request an audition with the King in order to thank for the ring, a request that was usually granted, but in this case, possibly due to the tense political situation and/or the advanced age of the monarch, the occasion did not materialize, to Kenessey's later regret.

Kenessey had decided to become a surgeon and he started working as assistant-in-training at the surgical clinic of Budapest. When in 1914 the First World War broke out he had to go to the front. He soon earned the Signum Laudis award for bravery but in 1915 he contracted typhoid fever. He was sent home to Kolozsvár where for weeks he fought a life-and-death struggle against the disease in an era without antibiotics. He survived, but barely. He lost half of his weight and developed thrombosis in his right leg, the consequences of which plagued him for the rest of his life. After his recovery he worked for some time in a hospital at the Italian front. After the war he went to Budapest and worked in the Rokus Hospital where he finished his surgical training.

== Life and work ==
After working as a surgeon for several years in Budapest, in 1925 Kenessey moved to the city of Balassagyarmat in the north of Hungary (on the border with Slovakia) as the director and Surgeon-in-Chief of the hospital in that city. In 1926 he married Ida Gizella Koltai (1906-1988), daughter of a well-to-do lawyer in that city. The couple soon had three children: Ilona (1927-2015), Béla (1929-2018), and Miklós (1933-2017). In the 19 years between 1925 and 1944 he transformed the rather decrepit, small hospital to one of the best-known, most respected hospitals of the country with 1000 beds. In 1935, he became Medical Counsellor (Egészségügyi Fötanácsos) to the Hungarian government. During the final year of World War II, with Sovjet and German troops battling along a front line that ran close to Balassagyarmat, the hospital was severely damaged and Kenessey had to work under very primitive conditions. In the following years, while no longer director of the hospital, he continued to work as chief of the surgical unit and contributed in a major way to the rebuilding of the hospital. Kenessey retired as Surgeon-in-Chief in 1960, when he was 71 years old, but continued to work in the outpatients clinic until 1971, when he was 82 years old. In the last years of his life he became almost blind. He spent his days listening to classical music. On the 31st of January 1973 he died of heart failure.

== Honours and awards; politics; standing in society ==
Kenessey received several major honours, and his stature was notably neutral to politics: the Horthy administration called him the incarnation of their ideals, while the communist regime gave him the title Merited Physician of the Hungarian People's Republic. He was never a member of a political party and was never known to have attended a political meeting. However, in 1944 he publicly protested the treatment of the Jews at the hands of the German war-time administration in occupied Hungary, citing unacceptable hygienic conditions in the ghetto. During his whole career he was very much loved and respected, by patients and colleagues alike. He was said to have exquisite bedside manners. In 1971 Kenessey became Honorary Freeman of the city of Balassagyarmat. In 1969, for his 80th birthday, Kenessey was bestowed the Gold Medal of the Order of Labour. Post-humously, the hospital in Balassagyarmat was named after him, and one of the streets in Balassagyarmat bears his name. A small exhibit in the local museum, and a plaque on the house where he lived, also pay tribute to him.

== Gallery ==
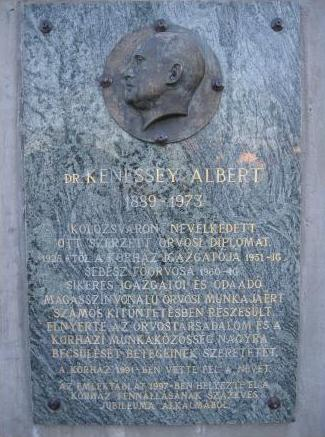
The memorial plaque in recognition of its former Surgeon-in-Chief and Director, Dr. Albert Kenessey, at the main entrance of the hospital in Balassagyarmat, Hungary, which is named after him.

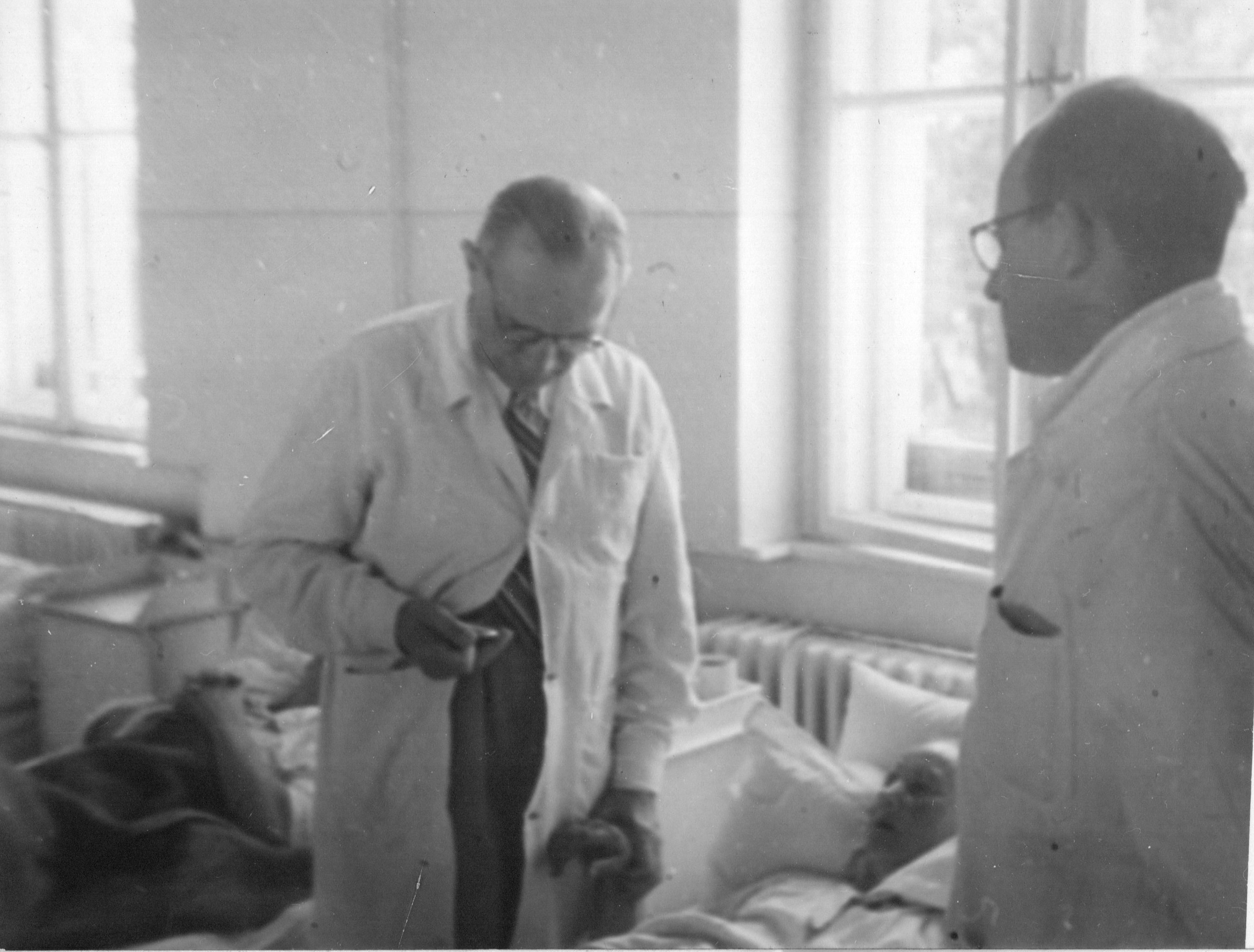
Kenessey (left) at work in the hospital in Balassagyarmat

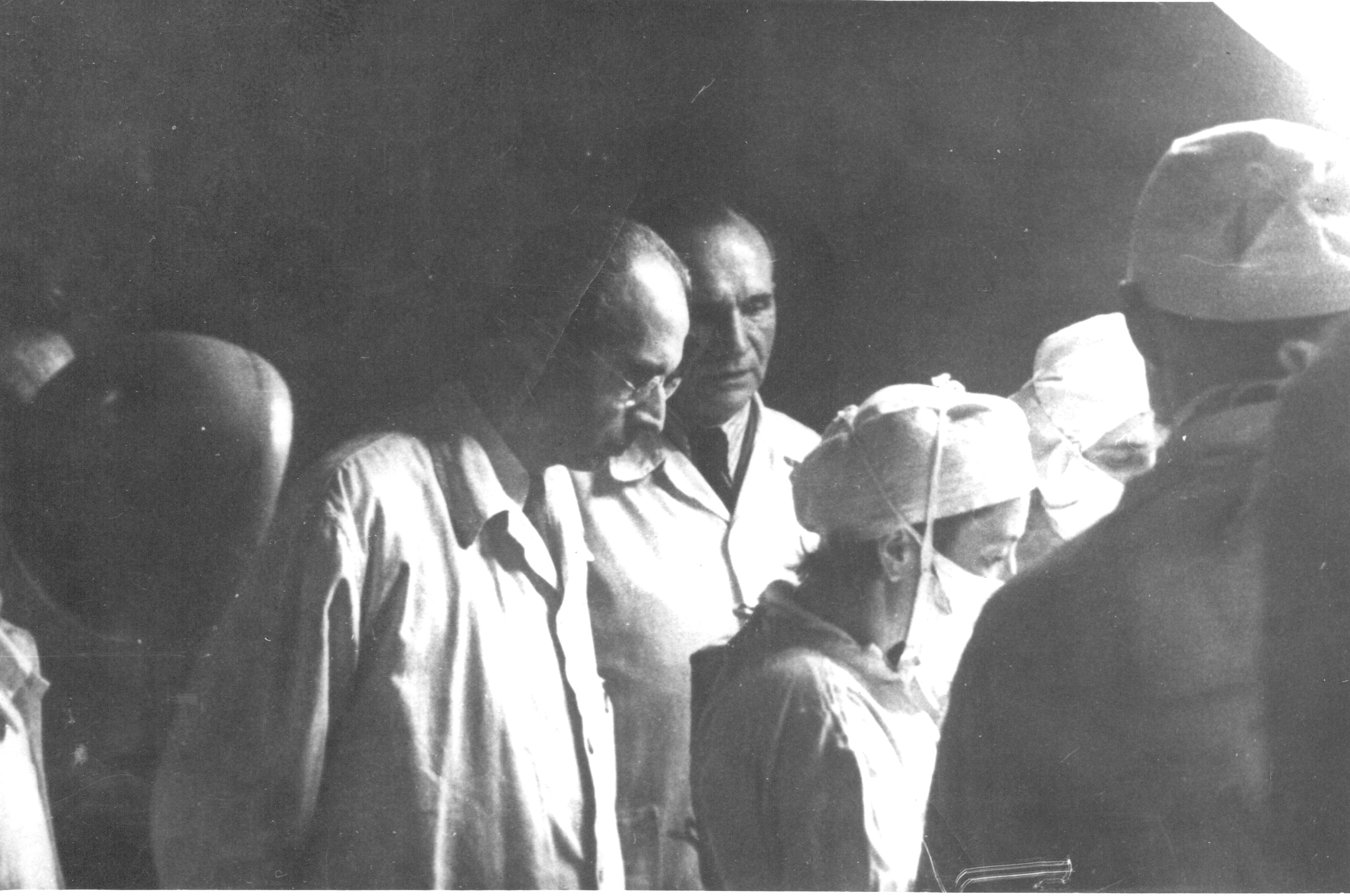
Kenessey (center, back) at work as surgeon

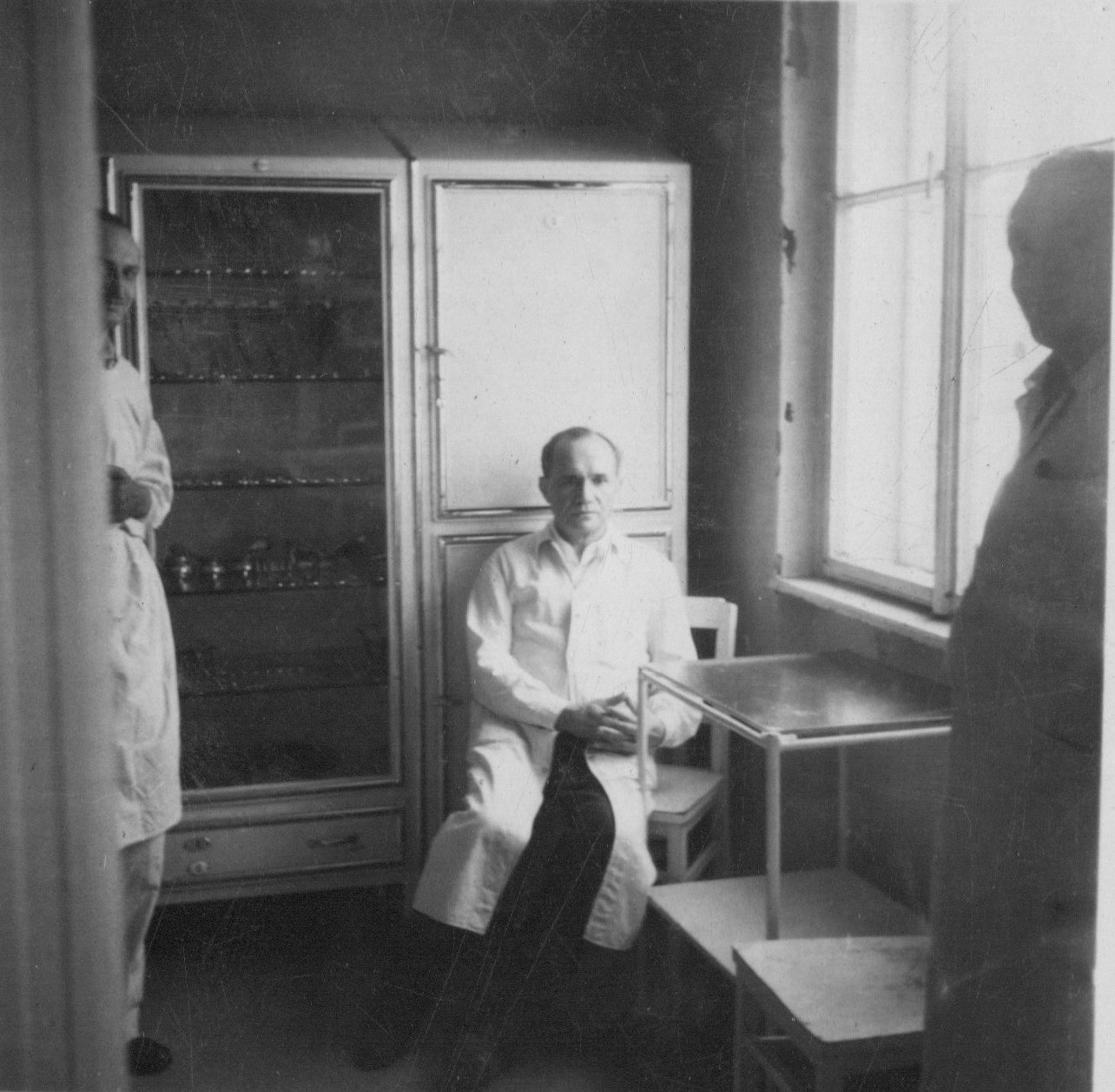
Dr. Albert Kenessey (sitting, center) in the hospital in 1949
