= Robert Gottsegen =

Robert Gottsegen (June 21, 1919 to March 2011) was an American periodontist and a pioneer in the field of periodontics.

== Education ==
Gottsegen graduated from the Columbia University College of Dental Medicine in 1943 in an accelerated program and later graduated from the postgraduate department of periodontics in 1948.

== Career ==
After his initial graduation, Gottsegen did a brief internship at Mount Sinai Hospital before being enlisted into the United States Army during the second World War. He was later hired to serve as director of the Department of Periodontology at the University of Pennsylvania before returning to Columbia to serve as the Director of Postgraduate Periodontics.
