= Klasov =

Municipality of Slovakia

Klasov Kalász
- Municipality
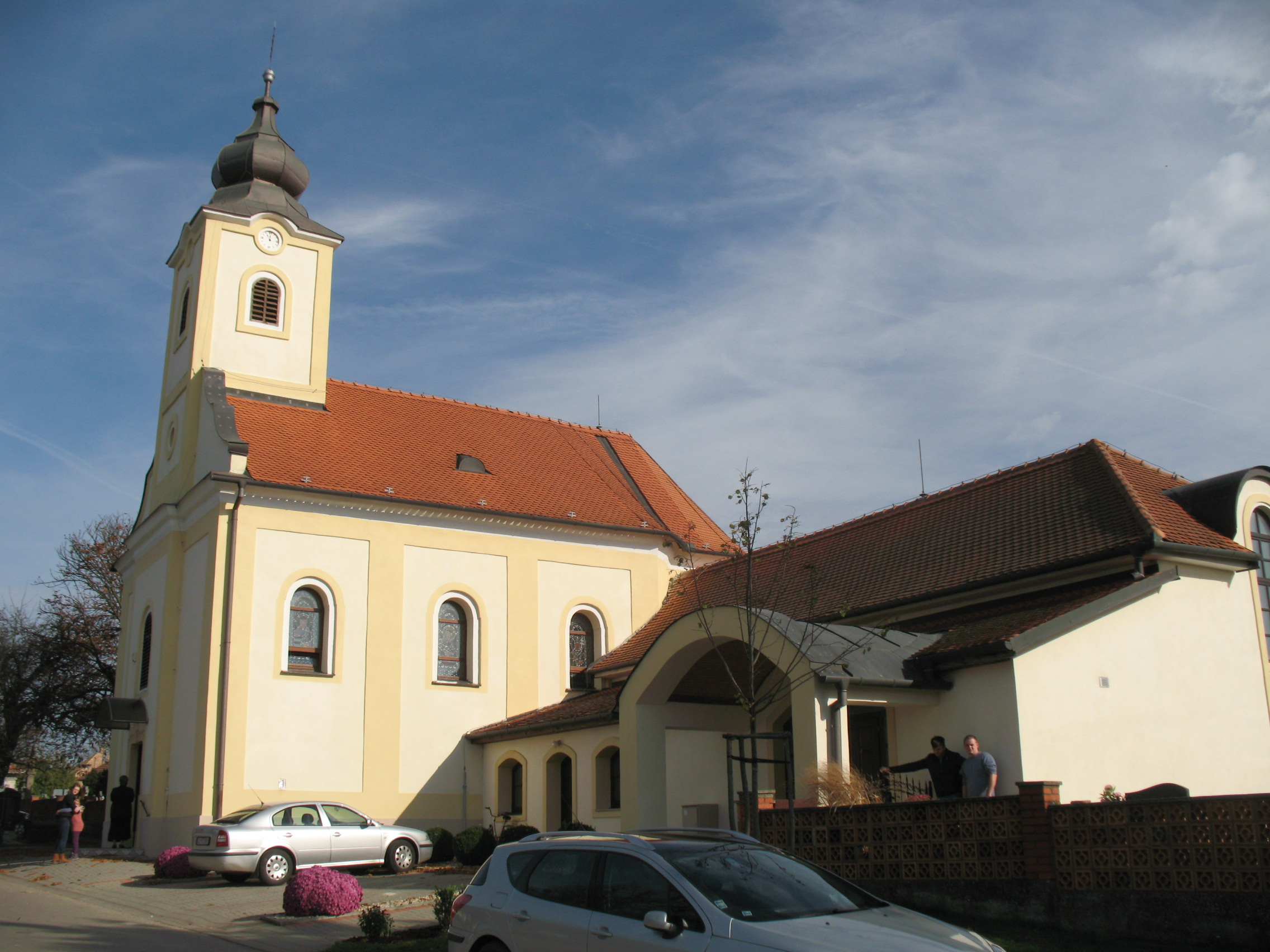

- Flag

- Location of Klasov in the Nitra Region Location of Klasov in Slovakia
- Coordinates: 48.28°N 18.27°E
- Country: Slovakia
- Region: Nitra Region
- District: Nitra District
- First mentioned: 1232

Area
  - Total: 12.23 km^{2} (4.72 sq mi)
- Elevation: 180 m (590 ft)

Population (2025)
  - Total: 1,434
- Time zone: UTC+1 (CET)
  - Summer (DST): UTC+2 (CEST)
- Postal code: 951 53
- Area code: +421 37
- Vehicle registration plate (until 2022): NR
- Website: www.klasov.sk

Klasov (Hungarian: Kalász) is a village and municipality in the Nitra District in western central Slovakia, in the Nitra Region.

== History ==
In historical records the village was first mentioned in 1232.

== Geography ==
The municipality lies at an altitude of 180 metres (590 ft) and covers an area of 12.23 km^{2} (4.72 sq mi) (2025).

== Population ==
Population statistic (10 years)
Year	1995	2005	2015	2025
Count	1898	1213	1343	1434
Difference		−36.09%	+10.71%	+6.77%

Population statistic
Year	2024	2025
Count	1428	1434
Difference		+0.42%

It has a population of 1434 people (31 December 2025).

=== Ethnicity ===
Census 2021 (1+ %)
Ethnicity	Number	Fraction
Slovak	1012	70.96%
Hungarian	350	24.54%
Not found out	114	7.99%
Czech	18	1.26%
Total	1426	

In year 2021 was 1426 people by ethnicity 1012 as Slovak, 350 as Hungarian, 114 as Not found out, 18 as Czech, 9 as Romanian, 2 as Bulgarian and 1 as Russian.

Note on population: The difference values of population numbers in the table "Population statistic" and in the sections "Ethnicity" & "Religion" is caused by the use of various statistical methods.

=== Religion ===
Census 2021 (1+ %)
Religion	Number	Fraction
Roman Catholic Church	1120	78.54%
None	143	10.03%
Not found out	115	8.06%
Total	1426	

In year 2021 was 1426 people by religion 1120 from Roman Catholic Church, 143 from None, 115 from Not found out, 11 from Jehovah's Witnesses, 9 from Greek Catholic Church, 9 from Evangelical Church, 6 from Christian Congregations in Slovakia, 5 from Other, 4 from Seventh-day Adventist Church, 2 from Paganism and natural spirituality, 1 from United Methodist Church and 1 from Buddhism.

== Facilities ==
The village has a public library and football pitch, and tennis pitch in Penzion Agroland.

== See also ==
- List of municipalities and towns in Slovakia

== Genealogical resources ==
The records for genealogical research are available at the state archive "Statny Archiv in Nitra, Slovakia"

- Roman Catholic church records (births/marriages/deaths): 1728-1913 (parish B)
