= Slovenské Ďarmoty =

Slovenské Ďarmoty Tótgyarmat
- Municipality
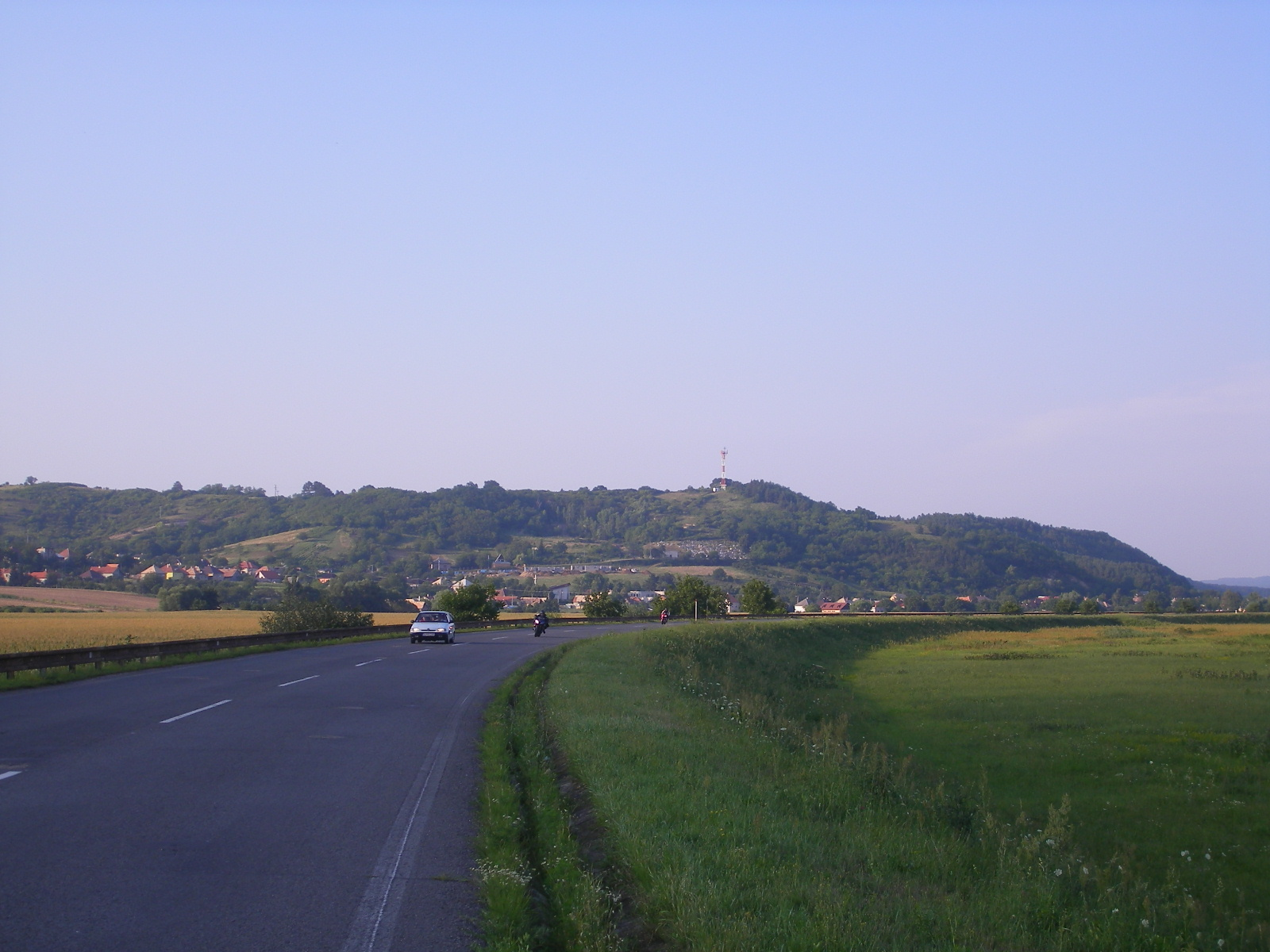

- Flag

- Location of Slovenské Ďarmoty in the Banská Bystrica Region Location of Slovenské Ďarmoty in Slovakia
- Coordinates: 48.09°N 19.29°E
- Country: Slovakia
- Region: Banská Bystrica Region
- District: Veľký Krtíš District
- First mentioned: 1919

Area
  - Total: 10.49 km^{2} (4.05 sq mi)
- Elevation: 148 m (486 ft)

Population (2025)
  - Total: 508
- Time zone: UTC+1 (CET)
  - Summer (DST): UTC+2 (CEST)
- Postal code: 991 07
- Area code: +421 47
- Vehicle registration plate (until 2022): VK
- Website: www.slovenskedarmoty.sk

Slovenské Ďarmoty (Hungarian: Tótgyarmat) is a village and municipality in the Veľký Krtíš District of the Banská Bystrica Region of southern Slovakia.

== Geography ==
The municipality lies at an altitude of 148 metres (486 ft) and covers an area of 10.49 km^{2} (4.05 sq mi) (2025).

== Population ==
Population statistic (10 years)
Year	1995	2005	2015	2025
Count	605	536	553	508
Difference		−11.40%	+3.17%	−8.13%

Population statistic
Year	2024	2025
Count	500	508
Difference		+1.6%

It has a population of 508 people (31 December 2025).

=== Ethnicity ===
Census 2021 (1+ %)
Ethnicity	Number	Fraction
Slovak	364	70%
Hungarian	101	19.42%
Not found out	50	9.61%
Romani	39	7.5%
Total	520	

In year 2021 was 520 people by ethnicity 364 as Slovak, 101 as Hungarian, 50 as Not found out, 39 as Romani, 2 as Czech, 1 as Russian and 1 as Other.

Note on population: The difference values of population numbers in the table "Population statistic" and in the sections "Ethnicity" & "Religion" is caused by the use of various statistical methods.

=== Religion ===
Census 2021 (1+ %)
Religion	Number	Fraction
Roman Catholic Church	374	71.92%
Evangelical Church	57	10.96%
Not found out	46	8.85%
None	34	6.54%
Total	520	

In year 2021 was 520 people by religion 374 from Roman Catholic Church, 57 from Evangelical Church, 46 from Not found out, 34 from None, 3 from Calvinist Church, 2 from Christian Congregations in Slovakia, 2 from Greek Catholic Church, 1 from Other and not ascertained christian church and 1 from Jehovah's Witnesses.
