= Balassagyarmat =

- Town
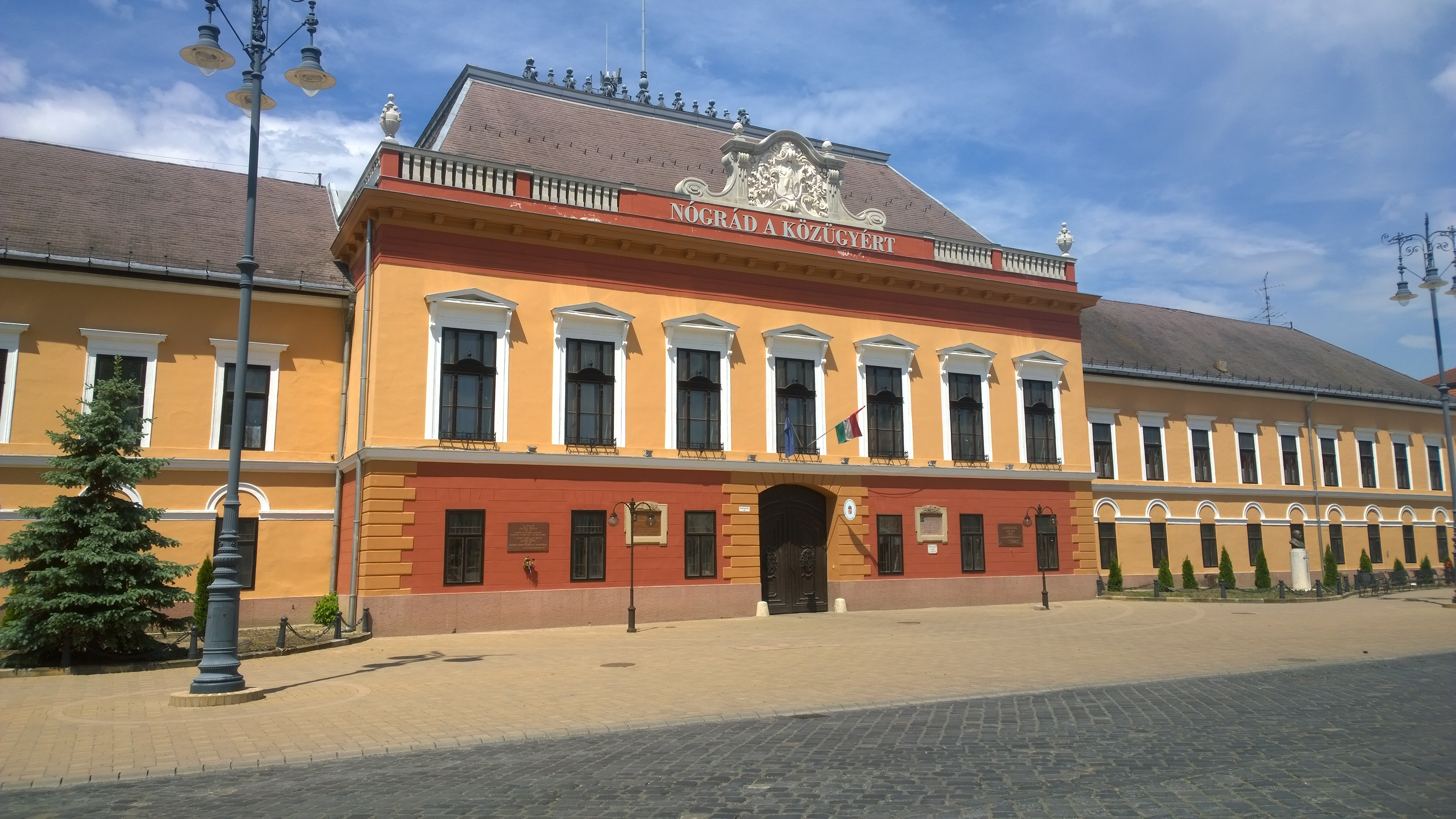
- Balassagyarmat County Hall

- Flag Coat of arms
- Nickname: Civitas Fortissima (The Bravest City)
- Location of Balassagyarmat Balassagyarmat (Hungary)
- Coordinates: 48°04′43″N 19°17′39″E
- Country: Hungary
- Region: Northern Hungary
- County: Nógrád
- District: Balassagyarmat
- First written mention: 1244

Government
  - Mayor: Gábor Csach (Fidesz-KDNP)

Area
  - Total: 23.33 km^{2} (9.01 sq mi)

Population (2017)
  - Total: 15,058
  - Density: 645.4/km^{2} (1,672/sq mi)
- Demonym: balassagyarmati
- Time zone: UTC+1 (CET)
  - Summer (DST): UTC+2 (CEST)
- Postal code: 2660
- Area code: (+36) 35
- Website: balassagyarmat.hu

Balassagyarmat (Hungarian: [ˈbɒlɒʃːɒɟɒrmɒt]; formerly Balassa-Gyarmath; German: Jahrmarkt; Slovak: Balážske Ďarmoty or Balašské Ďarmoty) is a town in northern Hungary.

Balassagyarmat is the cultural center of the Palóc people of Hungary as the prominent author of Hungarian epic, Kálmán Mikszáth said. The Palóc people's origin is quite mysterious. Their distinctive dialect, culture, folklore, and traditions make them a unique ethnicity.

== History ==
=== Medieval ===
Due to its favorable location, Balassagyarmat has been populated since the Copper Age. When the Magyar tribes entered the Carpathian Basin, Grand Chief Árpád sent his two generals, Zoárd and Kadosa to take the northern parts of Hungary. After the occupation of Nógrád Castle, Zoárd and Kadosa took control over the Balassagyarmat region. The name of the town derives from the name of Gyarmat, which was one of the seven Magyar tribes who came with Árpád. The Gyarmat tribe settled in the Balassagyarmat region.

In 1241, the Mongols invaded the country, destroying the settlement completely. After the Mongols withdrew the following year, stone castles were built all over the country at the urging of King Bela IV. He was anticipating a second Mongol invasion, and he expected to stop them with the help of stone castles.

The first medieval castle of Balassagyarmat developed from a watchtower established after the First Mongol invasion of Hungary. At this time, it was called just Gyarmat. It was the king's property, and it used to belong to Hont castle in 1244. King Béla IV gave these estates to Miklós, son of Detre of the Kacsics Clan in 1246. Detre became the ancestor of the Balassa family. In the same document, the king ordered the construction of a castle in Gyarmat, which was completed around 1260. It was how Detre, the ancestor of the Balassa family, built the first fortified stone tower in Gyarmat along the Ipoly River. The construction was certainly ready in 1274, as it was mentioned in a contemporary charter.

Later Péter (aka Furró), one of the members of the Balassa family was accused of infidelity, so King László IV took the castle from him. However, the new owner, Comes Demeter of Pozsony and Zólyom Counties could not take the property as the previous owner did not cede it. This incident was mentioned in a document in 1290, according to which Demeter had to take the residential tower of Gyarmat by force. As it was, Demeter was also related to the Balassa family, so the property remained in their hands. They did not let it slip from their hands. In 1374, the Balassa family received a new letter of donation from King Lajos the Great so the town remained the property of the family. The only change was that the castle was in the hands of the king, who usually appointed the members of the Balassa family as his castellans. The settlement developed into a market town by the 15th century, but despite its closely integrated castle, it had no military significance. Officially speaking, Balassagyarmat became a market town in 1437.

The situation changed radically after the battle of Mohács in 1526. The importance of the castles of Nógrád County, including Gyarmat castle, had been increased. The northern part of the fortification was defended by the Ipoly River, but the other defenses were hastily fortified, and the city was surrounded by a wooden palisade.

The Ottoman Turks were expanding their rule unstoppably to the north, and in 1541 they took Buda as well. In 1544, 500 soldiers were guarding Gyarmat castle, under the command of Horváth Bertalan. (This article uses the Oriental name order for Hungarians, where family names come first.)

The enemy took the nearby Szanda castle and destroyed it in 1551. Captain Horváth heard of the approaching Turks in 1552 and fled from the castle, leaving it empty. It was how Pasha Hadim Ali of Buda castle took it without a fight. He set it on fire and demolished it at once. The castle was recaptured by the royal troops only in the 1593 campaign of Chief Captain Kristóf Tiefenbach of Kassa (Košice, Kaschau) who was aided by the troops of Pálffy Miklós and Homonnay István. They could easily take the small castle as the Turk garrison set it on fire and fled when the Christian army was coming. Colonel Philip Morgentaller was appointed as captain of the castle, and immediately began repairing and restoring the damaged walls. Balassi Bálint was a Renaissance poet and warrior who lost his life at the siege of Esztergom in 1594.

Below is a commemorative plaque to Bálint Balassi (1554–1594) Hungarian poet and warrior. It was affixed to the wall of the high school which bears his name. Quote: "The beautiful confines of your homeland are truncated everywhere." (Balassagyarmat, Deák Ferenc Street Nr 17)

The Imperial guards of Gyarmat opened the gates of the castle before General Rhédey Ferenc, the commander of Prince Bocskai István of Transylvania in 1605. Nevertheless, the castle was returned to King Rudolf in 1606, according to the Treaty of Vienna in 1606. The Diets held in 1608, 1613, and 1618 ordered to reinforce the castle which was carried out. Despite these fortifications, the castle was occupied by Prince Bethlen Gábor's army in 1619, but according to the peace of Nikolsburg in 1622, it was given back to the Habsburg king.

Balassagyarmat was besieged by the Turks in 1648 with an army of 4,000 men, but the cavalry of Count Ádám Forgách, the Chief Captain of Érsekújvár (Nové Zámky) castle came to the aid of the defenders, and he chased the attackers away. In 1652, Count Esterházy Ferenc was the captain of the castle, the one who fell in the battle of Vezekény. After 1652, Balassa Ferenc and his brother Imre became the chief captains of the castle. However, Imre demanded a bigger share from the leadership and the estate, causing a quarrel between them.

The Turks were able to benefit from their debate, though. The Ottoman Empire seemed to be declining but an iron-handed Grand Vizier called Köprülü Ahmed wanted to prevent this process. He launched a huge army against Hungary in 1663, his troops occupied, burned, and destroyed the smaller border castles that lay in their path. Taking advantage of the quarrel between the Balassi brothers, the Turkish army led by Köprülü – joined by the army of Prince Apafi Mihály of Transylvania – occupied Balassagyarmat. They burned and thoroughly destroyed the castle in 1663 or 1665.

As it had lost its military significance, the ruined walls were not rebuilt again. During the Ottoman Wars, the area and the city became depopulated. After the end of the war, the settlement started to develop again, and it was rebuilt in 1690. Due to its favorable geographical location, the town was rapidly populated. In 1701, the fortifications of the town were blown up, according to the decree of Emperor Leopold. Later, the stones of the fortress were used for construction, so today there is hardly any trace of it above the surface.

=== 20th century ===
Since 1998, the town's coat of arms has borne the Latin inscription "Civitas Fortissima" (the bravest city) because it was claimed that in January 1919 Czechoslovak troops crossed the demarcation line delineated in December 1918 in preparation for the Treaty of Trianon, illegally occupying towns south of the line, including Balassagyarmat. The occupation was the subject of a 2009 song by the nationalist rock-band Kárpátia, "Civitas Fortissima".

During World War II, May 9, 1944, Germans kept 3,000 Jews from the town and the surrounding villages imprisoned in a ghetto. They were all sent to Auschwitz concentration camp on June 11 and 14, 1944.

Balassagyarmat was captured on 9 December 1944 by Soviet troops of the 2nd Ukrainian Front in the course of the Budapest Offensive.

In 1973, two young men (17 and 19), the sons of the local secretary of the state-party, broke into the city's girls' dormitory and took hostage 20 girls. They demanded a bus to cross the border into Austria. They stayed there for five days without any food or drink before being taken down. The older brother was shot by three snipers with special bullets on the fifth day from outside the building. The younger brother was captured and sentenced to 15 years in prison, and his four friends, who had heard about their plans before they committed the crime, were sentenced to four years each in prison. None of the girls was injured physically except one, who broke her arm when she tried to escape by jumping out of the window of the dormitory on the second day. Afterwards, they were instructed not to publicly talk about the case. Csenge Hatala, a young writer, started collecting documents and conducting interviews with the victims forty years later.

This was the first hostage situation in the modern history of Hungary. The unqualified police and military force found themselves in a situation they had no experience of. In communist Hungary, serious crimes were not only awkward, but actually harmful to the Party and its leaders. The city authorities tried to hide the details and smother the case, but it triggered a huge wave of indignation in the city and throughout the country as a whole.

== Geography ==
Balassagyarmat is located in northern Hungary on the border with Slovakia. The town lies on the left bank of the Ipoly/Ipeľ River, which forms part of the international boundary between the two countries.

The surrounding area is characterized by low hills and agricultural land typical of the Nógrád County region. Due to its border location, Balassagyarmat has historically served as an important local center for trade and cross-border connections. Across the Ipeľ lies the Slovak town of Slovenské Ďarmoty.

== Demographics ==
In 2001 Balassagyarmat had 18,474 inhabitants. The population were Hungarian 98%, Romani 2%. 100% of the total population speak Hungarian as their mother tongue.

As of 2022, its population recorded was 14,185.

== Notable people ==
- Balassi (Balassa) family (means "from Balassa")
- Bálint Balassi (aka Balassa) (1554, Zólyom - 1594)
- Josef Dobrovský (1753–1829), a Czech philologist and historian
- Márk Rózsavölgyi (1789–1848), musician, componist
- Maier Zipser (1815–1869), neolog rabbi
- Kálmán Mikszáth (1847-1910), Hungarian novelist, journalist, and politician, lived here
- Károly Balogh de Mankó Bük (1879-1944), Hungarian statesman and writer.
- Iván Nagy (hu) (1824–1898), genealogist, heraldic, historian
- János Zádori (1831-1887), Roman Catholic priest, Ecclesiastical writer, lived here
- Sigmund Streisinger (1880-1942), glazer
- Dezső Magos (Munk) (1884-1944), Hungarian architect
- Albert Kenessey surgeon (1889–1973)
- Rose & Jenny Dolly, Hungarian-American dancers and actresses
- Lőrinc Szabó (de Gáborján) (1900-1957), a poet and literary translator, lived here
- Lajos Ligeti (hu) (1902–1987), orientalist
- Michel Gyarmathy, director of Folies Bergère in Paris
- Ernő Zórád (hu) (1911–2004), illustrator, graphic artist, painter, comic artist
- Károly Jobbágy (hu) (1921–1998), poet and literary translator
- Iván Markó (hu) (born 1947), ballet dancer, choreographer
- György Udvardy (born 1960), Roman Catholic Archbishop of Veszprém
- Ferenc Palánki (hu) (born 1964), Roman Catholic Bishop of Debrecen-Nyíregyháza
- Zoltán Szlezák (born 1967), football player
- Péter Kőszeghy (born 1971), composer and music educator
- Orsolya Szatmári (hu) (born 1975), pop singer
- Zsigmond Vizy (born 1884), leader of the Palóc brigade

== Twin towns – sister cities ==
Balassagyarmat is twinned with:

- Dej, Romania
- Heimenkirch, Germany
- Lamezia Terme, Italy
- Ostrołęka, Poland
- Slovenské Ďarmoty, Slovakia
- Svaliava, Ukraine
- Pavia, Italy

== Gallery ==
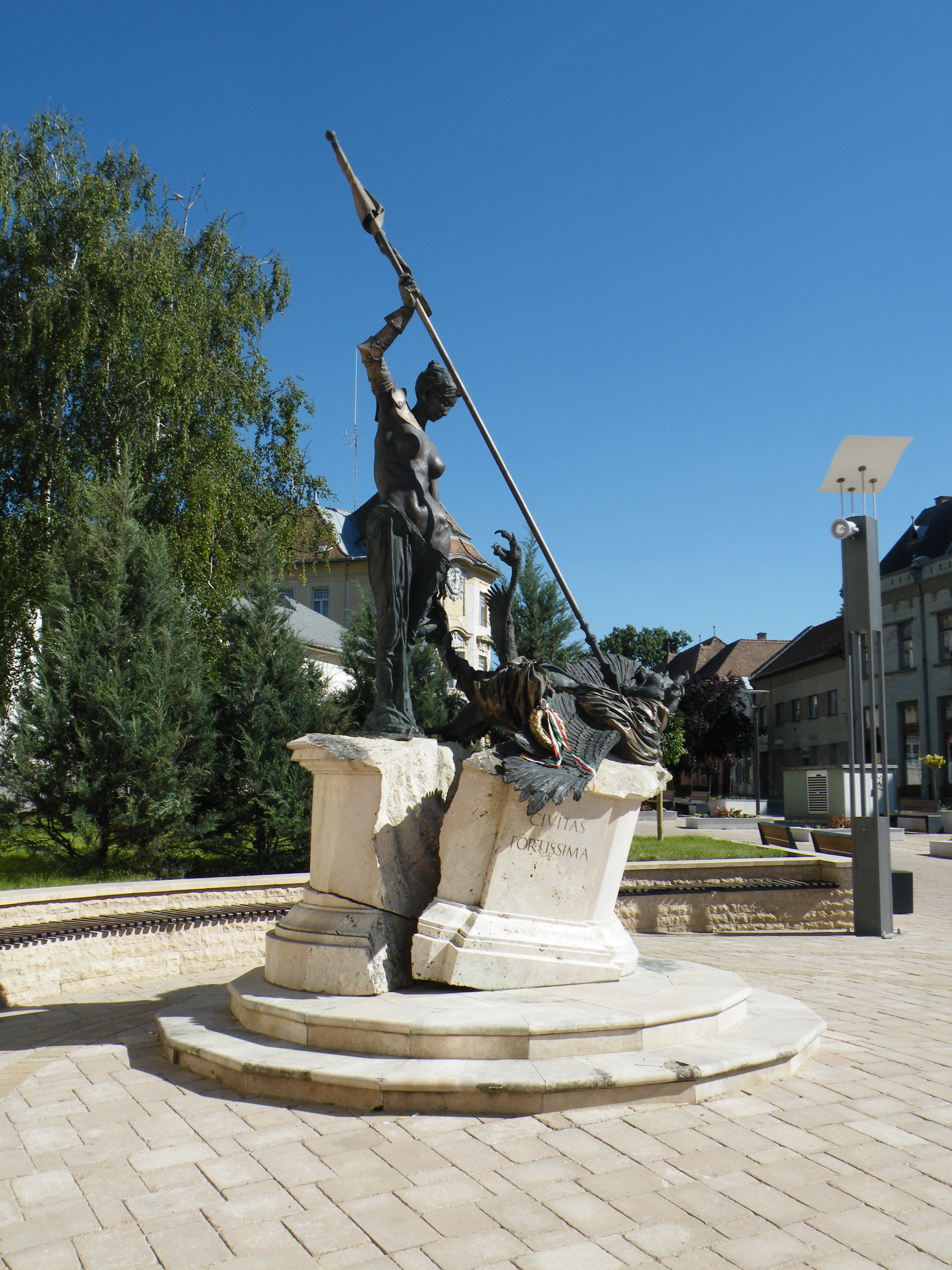
Civitas Fortissima

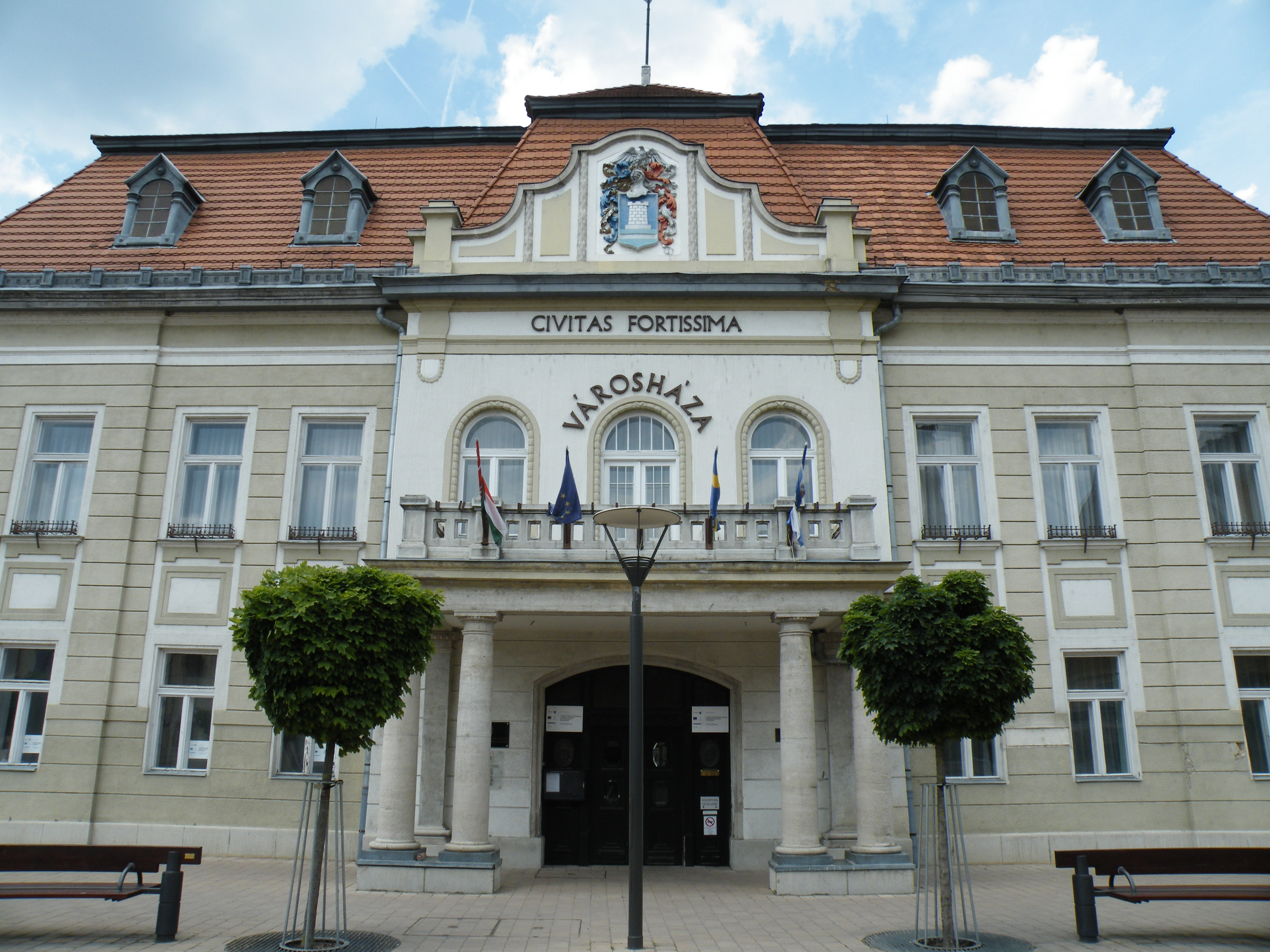
City Hall

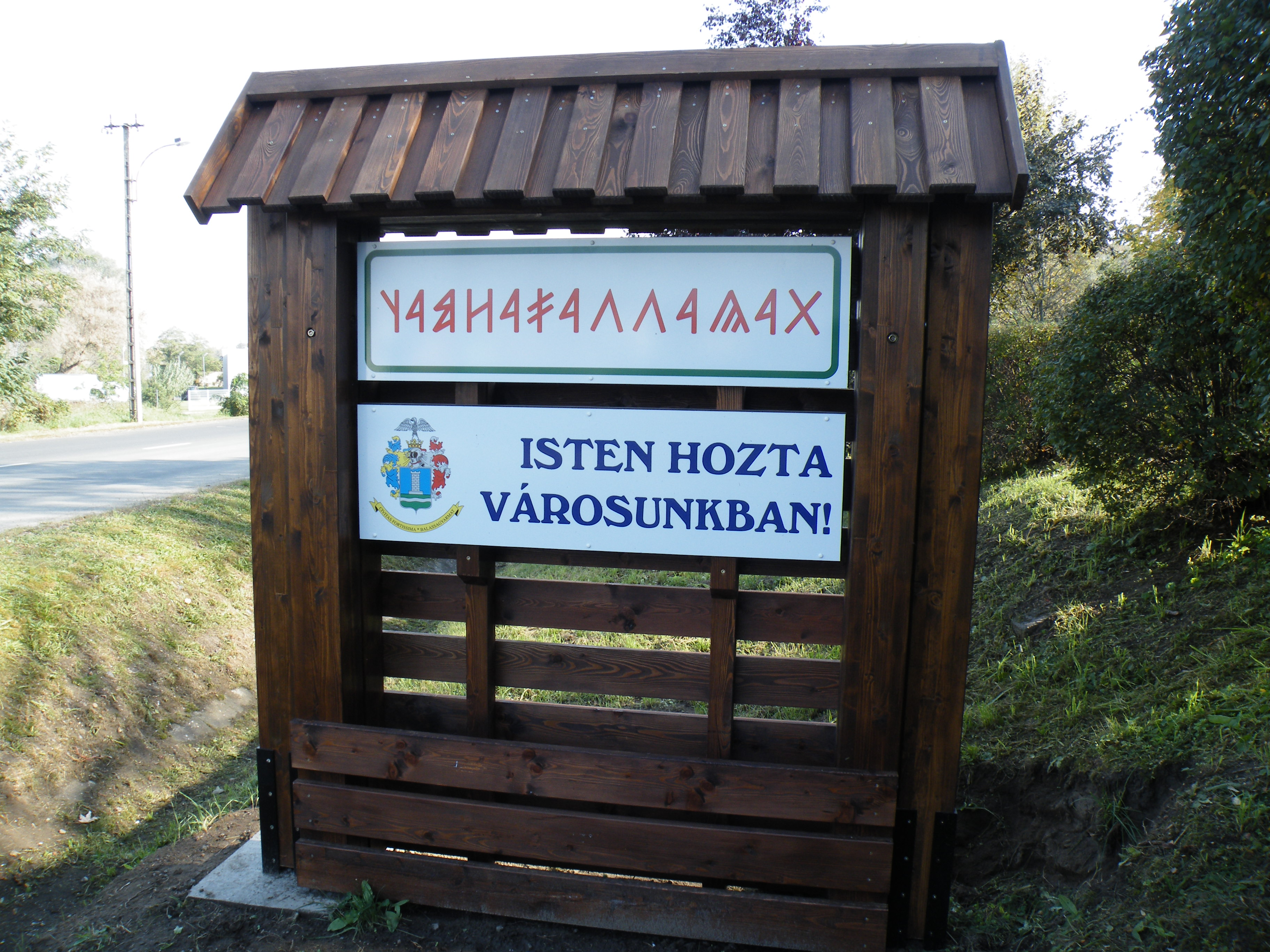
Welcome Sign in Balassagyarmat

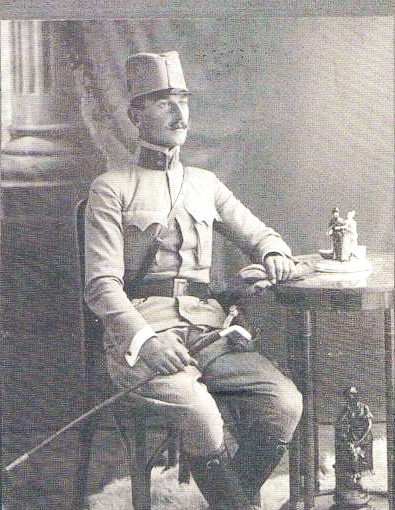
Zsigmond Vizy, leader of the Palóc brigade

== See also ==
- Slovenské Ďarmoty
- Salesians in Hungary
- Balassa
- Prison of Balassagyarmat (hu)
- Lutheran Church of Balassagyarmat (hu)
- Palóc Museum (hu)
- Public transport of Balassagyarmat (hu)
