= Rudolf Hoernes =

Austrian geologist

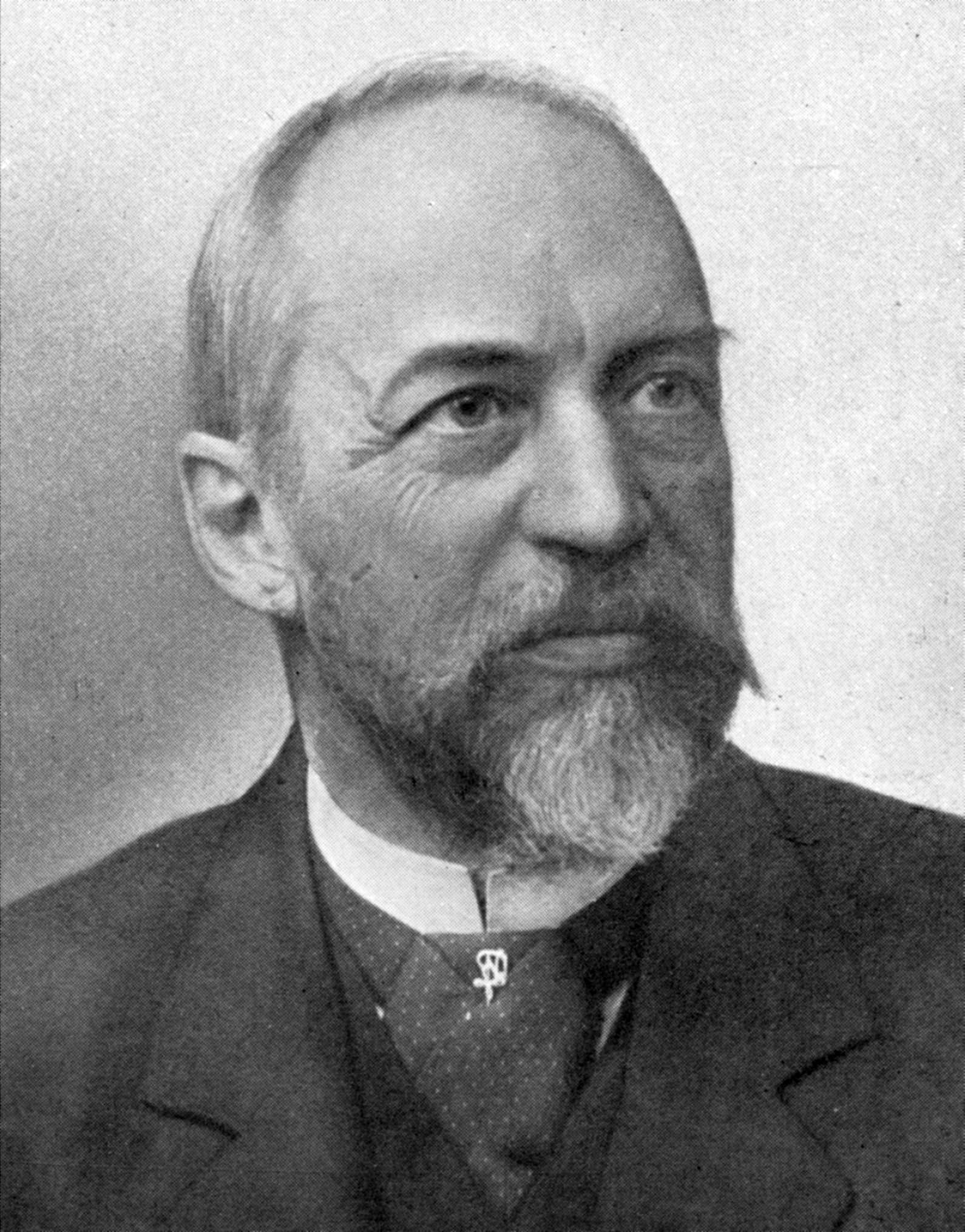
- Born: 7 October 1850; Vienna
- Died: 20 August 1912 (aged 61); Judendorf-Straßengel (Styria)
- Scientific career
- Fields: Geology
- Doctoral students: Karl Alfons Penecke

Rudolf Franz Moriz Hoernes (7 October 1850 – 20 August 1912) was an Austrian geologist, who taught at the University of Graz. He was known for his earthquake studies in 1878 and proposed a classification of earthquakes into subsidence earthquakes, volcanic earthquakes and tectonic earthquakes. In 1893, he published a detailed textbook on earthquake theory (Erdbebenkunde) from a geological point of view. Along with his "uncle" Eduard Suess, he was a major influence on academic geology in Austria.

== Life and work ==
Hoernes was born in Vienna, son of the curator of the imperial cabinet of curiosities, Moritz Hörnes and Aloisia, née Strauss who was a sister of the wife of the geologist Eduard Suess. Another sister of Aloisia was married to Johann August Natterer (1821–1900). Aloisia was also the niece of Paul Maria Partsch (1791–1856) who was in charge of the imperial cabinet. His siblings were Moriz (Franz Karl) (1852–1917), Ottilie (1853–1939) who married Adolf Mader (1837–1908), Heinrich (1855–1903), and Franz (1857–1918). Rudolf was privately tutored and began to studied science at an early age informally from family members and became interested in geology thanks to his uncle Suess. He went to the gymnasium in Vienna and later the Royal Josefstadt Gymnasium (run by Piarists) graduating (passing the Matura) in 1869 and joined the University of Vienna. His father had died the previous year and his studies were interrupted by compulsory military service, as a lieutenant in the infantry regiment. This was just around the time the first German translations of Darwin's work appeared. He studied geology under Suess and after his studies he joined the Imperial Geological Survey to map South Tyrol in 1876. Between 1871 and 1873 he worked at the imperial cabinet examining mollusc systematics. He also attended the lectures of Edmund von Mojsisovics, Emanuel von Reuss, and Ludwig Carl Schmarda. In 1872 he joined the Association of Natural Historians in Vienna. With support from his maternal grandfather Franz Strauss, he joined Suess to Italy and they visited Mount Vesuvius, just ahead of an eruption. In 1872 he visited the Krkonoše mountains with Suess, Ferdinand von Hochstetter (1829–1884), Franz Toula (1845–1920), Johann Nepomuk Woldrich (1834–1906), and Rudolf Falb (1838–1903) among others. Falb had converted from Catholicism to Protestantism and in 1869 he had published an idea on earthquakes and volcanism, suggesting that there was a moon phase association. This idea would be critiqued by Hoernes in his later works. In 1873 he joined an archaeological team under Alexander Conze (1831-1903). In 1874 he became an intern at the Royal Geological Institute. He was awarded a doctorate in 1875 with a thesis in two parts, one on tertiary studies and the other on the geology of the island of Samothrace. He became an associate professor at the University of Graz shortly after and he began to study earthquakes from 1877. Melchior Neumayr, the paleontology chair in Vienna, married to Suess' elder daughter Paula Aloisia Suess (1861–1921), gave a glowing review of Hoernes' habilitation application.. He became a Professor of geology in Graz. From 1883 he suffered from gout and spent some time in the spa town of Pistyán in 1886. His teaching position was then taken by Karl Alphons Penecke. In 1899 he was elected to the Imperial Academy of Sciences in Vienna. He attended the International Geological Congress in St. Petersburg in 1896-97, and at Paris in 1900. After 1895, Hoernes believed in free education. He had also been involved in protesting the roles of the Christian church in rejecting evolutionary ideas. In 1908, this debate was led by Johannes Ude and was debated in the press by Hoernes. His public writing in the press on the topic earned him the name "fighter for the freedom of science". He gave numerous lectures to the general public, sometimes at the free school started by Otto Glöckel, Undersecretary of State for Education and Instruction (he passed a rule in 1919 preventing compulsory participation in religious events) and also at the Styrian Adult Education Association and various other groups including working class organizations. He also led outdoor walks for the interested public.

Hoernes grouped earthquakes that occurred along tectonic lines as "tectonic earthquakes". In 1877 he gave a lecture on the Belluno earthquake and on Falb's theory demonstrating that the cause was fractures and thrust lines running along the region. He also created two other classes of earthquakes, collapse earthquakes and volcanic earthquakes. He published his earthquake studies in 1878 and consolidated it into his most influential textbook on earthquake science, Erdbebenkunde, in 1893. Falb believed that earthquakes were the result of subterranean fluid movements or volcanic eruptions that were influenced by the moon and the sun. Towards the end of his life he had a special interest in the extinction of organisms.

Hoernes married Johanna "Jenny" Katherina Mathilde von Reuss (1859–1943) in 1877. She was the youngest daughter of the mineralogist August Emanuel von Reuss (1811–1873). .She became a poet and published some in magazines and as collections. They had a son Philipp Wilhelm Ludwig (August 7, 1884 – July 13, 1953) who became a chemist and nuclear scientist during the third Reich. Johanna "Tanna" (January 31, 1887 – June 16, 1972) studied art in Vienna and married the artist Luigi Kasimir (1881–1962) and became a noted etcher.
