= Tertiary period =

Former term for the geologic period from 65 million to 2.58 million years ago

Tertiary
- 66.0 – 2.6 Ma

Chronology
An approximate timescale of key Cenozoic events Vertical axis scale: Millions of years ago

Etymology
- Name formality: Informal

Usage information
- Celestial body: Earth
- Regional usage: Regional(?)
- Time scale(s) used: ICS Time Scale (formerly)
- Formerly used by: ICS

Definition
- Chronological unit: Period
- Stratigraphic unit: System
- Time span formality: Informal
- Lower boundary definition: K-Pg extinction event
- Lower boundary GSSP: None
- Lower GSSP ratified: N/A
- Upper boundary definition: Beginning of the Quaternary glaciation
- Upper boundary GSSP: None
- Upper GSSP ratified: N/A

The Tertiary (/ˈtɜːrʃəri/ TUR-shər-ee, US also /ˈtɜːrʃi.ɛri/ TUR-shee-err-ee) is an obsolete geologic period spanning 66 million to 2.6 or 1.8 million years ago. The period began with the extinction of the non-avian dinosaurs in the Cretaceous–Paleogene extinction event, at the start of the Cenozoic Era, and extended to the beginning of the Quaternary glaciation at the end of the Pliocene Epoch. The Tertiary has not been recognised by the International Commission on Stratigraphy (ICS) since the late 1980s, with the timespan of the Tertiary now being split into the earlier Paleogene and the more recent Neogene periods, though the term continues to be used in some scientific publications.

== Historical use of the term ==
The term Tertiary was first used by Giovanni Arduino during the mid-18th century. He classified geologic time into primitive (or primary), secondary, and tertiary periods based on observations of geology in Northern Italy. Later a fourth period, the Quaternary, was applied.

In the early development of the study of geology, the periods were thought by scriptural geologists to correspond to the Biblical narrative, the rocks of the Tertiary being thought to be associated with the Great Flood.

In 1833, Charles Lyell incorporated a Tertiary Period into his own, far more detailed system of classification, based on fossil mollusks he collected in Italy and Sicily in 1828–1829. He subdivided the Tertiary Period into four epochs according to the percentage of fossil mollusks resembling modern species found in those strata. He used Greek names: Eocene, Miocene, Older Pliocene, and Newer Pliocene.

Although these divisions seemed adequate for the region to which the designations were originally applied (parts of the Alps and plains of Italy), when the same system was later extended to other parts of Europe and to America, it proved to be inapplicable. Therefore, the use of mollusks was abandoned from the definition and the epochs were renamed and redefined.

For much of the time during which the term 'Tertiary' was in formal use, it referred to the span of time between 65 and 1.8 million years ago. The end date of the Cretaceous and the start date of the Quaternary were subsequently redefined at c. 66 and 2.6 million years ago respectively.

In 1989, the International Commission on Stratigraphy (ICS) eliminated the use of "Tertiary" on their stratigraphic charts, instead dividing this timespan into the Paleogene and Neogene periods (terms which had been coined over a century earlier in the 1850s by Austrian geologist Moritz Hörnes), which in previous stratigraphic charts were treated as subdivisions of the Tertiary. In 2004, the ICS considered the Neogene to also include the entire Quaternary period, thus making the Neogene span until the present, but this was not widely followed and the ICS later restored the Quaternary to full period status by 2009. In 2006 it was remarked that despite the ICS elimination of the term over a decade earlier, at that time, "Tertiary" was still more common than Paleogene and Neogene.

== Modern equivalents ==
The Tertiary period lies between the Mesozoic Era and the Quaternary Period, although it is no longer recognized as a formal unit by the International Commission on Stratigraphy.

The span of the Tertiary is subdivided into the Paleocene (66–56 million years BP), the Eocene (56–33.9 million years BP), the Oligocene (33.9–23.04 million years BP), the Miocene (23.04–5.333 million years BP) and the Pliocene (5.333–2.58 million years BP), extending to the first stage of the Pleistocene, the Gelasian Stage.
