= Falb =

Falb is a surname. Notable people with the surname include:

- Iuliu Falb (1942–2009), Romanian fencer
- John Falb (born 1971), American businessman and racing driver
- Rudolf Falb (1838–1903), Austrian popularizer of natural history

== See also ==
- Falbe, a surname
- Richard Falbr (1940–2026), Czech politician
