= Adolf Martin Pleischl =

Austrian chemist (1787–1867)

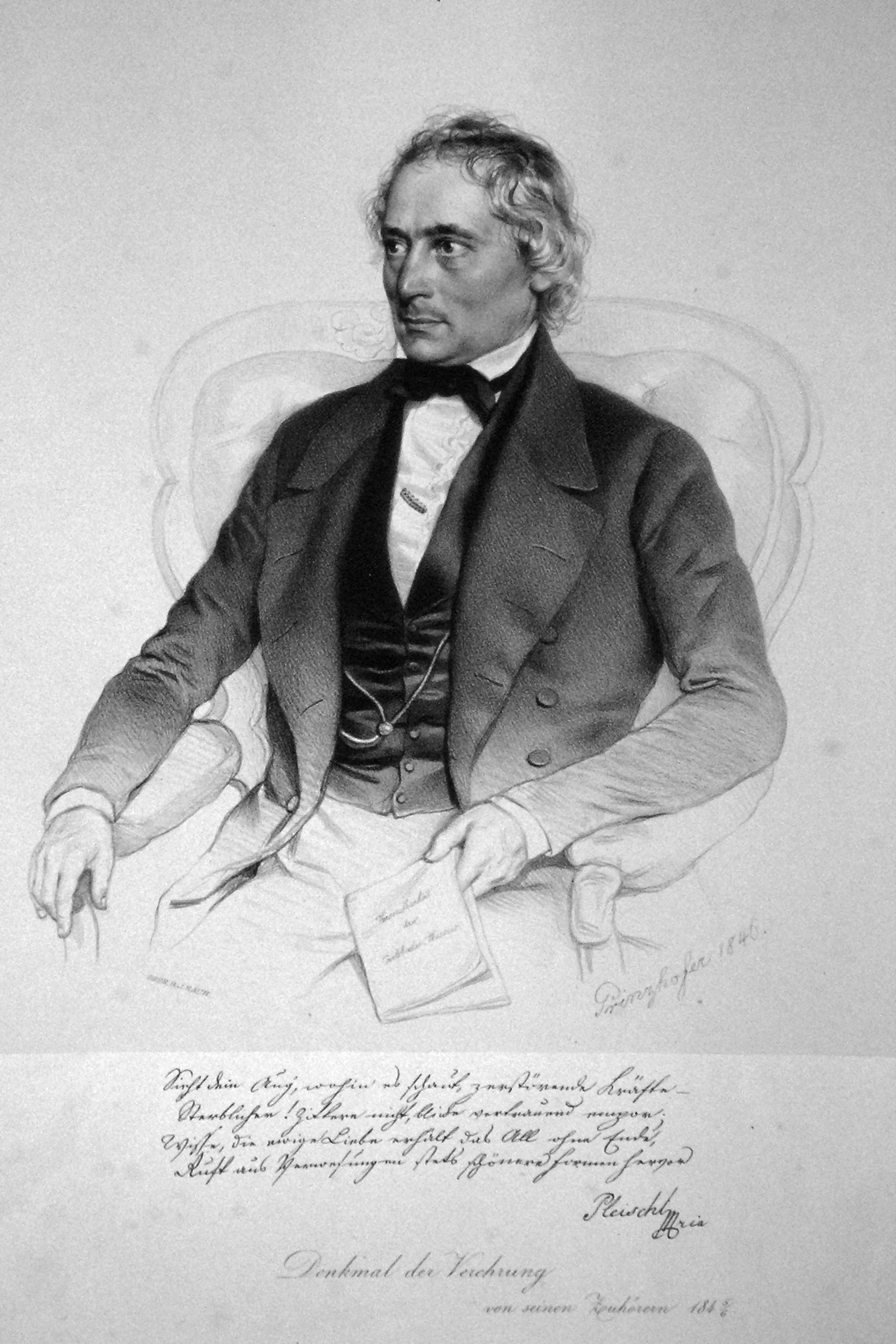
Adolf Martin Pleischl, lithograph by August Prinzhofer, 1846.

Adolf Martin Pleischl (10 October 1787 – 31 July 1867) was an Austrian chemist and medical doctor.

== Biography ==
Pleischl was born on 10 October 1787 in Horní Planá. In 1815 he obtained his medical doctorate from the University of Prague, where he later served as a professor of general and pharmaceutical chemistry (1821–1838). At Prague he is credited with improvement and redevelopment of the chemical-pharmaceutical institute. In 1838 he relocated to the University of Vienna, where he also redeveloped and modernized its chemical and pharmaceutical facilities. As an instructor, two of his better-known students were Johann Florian Heller (1813–1871) and Johann August Natterer (1821–1900).

While at Prague he performed the first scientific analysis of its water (the Vltava River, city fountains, drinking water). He also analysed the thermal springs of Bohemian spa sites, and was an enthusiastic recruiter for spa treatment at Karlsbad (now Karlovy Vary), Marienbad (now Mariánské Lázně), Franzensbad (now Františkovy Lázně) and Teplice. His endorsement of Karlsbad water helped lead to a lucrative source of income through the export of bottled water and soda products.

Pleischl is credited with the creation of a safe non-metallic enamel for coating metal dishes. Also, he attempted to liquefy carbon dioxide by means of pressure and low temperature, a process that was later successfully achieved by his pupil, Johann August Natterer.

In his later years, he was awarded with the Knight's Cross of the Order of Franz Joseph. He died on 31 July 1867 in Dorf an der Enns. In 1949, the "Pleischlgasse" in Simmering (11th district of Vienna) was named in his honour. His daughter Mary, was married to physician Johann von Oppolzer (1808–1871).
