= Kalocsa =

- Town
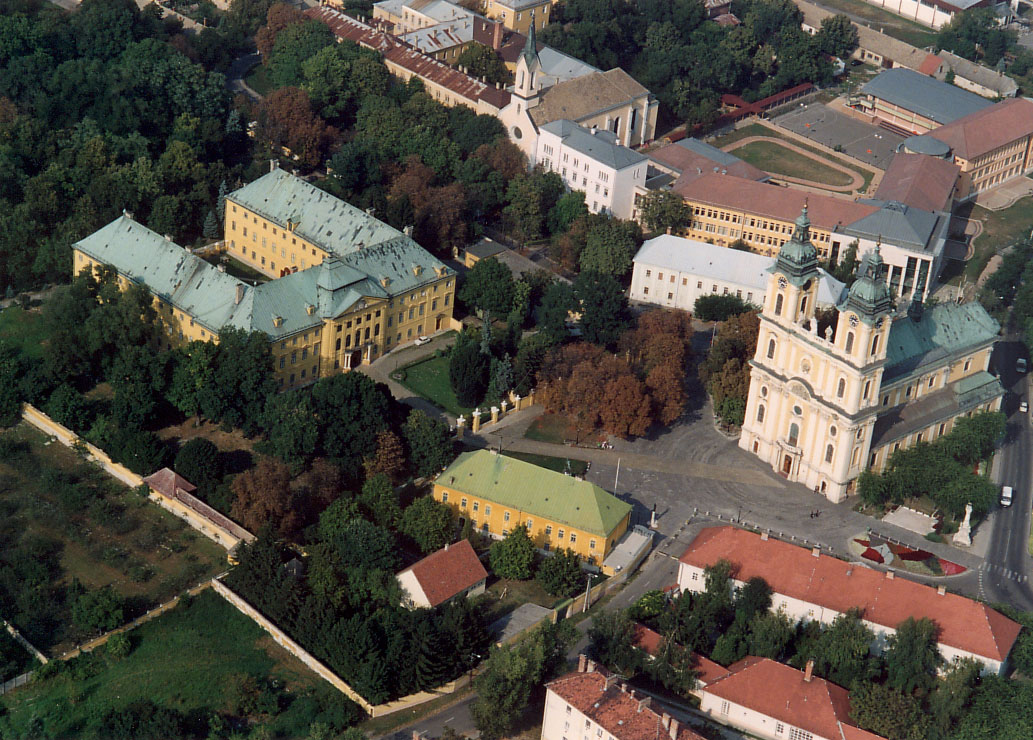
- Archepiscopal Palace

- Flag Coat of arms

- Location of Kalocsa Kalocsa (Hungary)
- Coordinates: 46.53347°N 18.98579°E
- Country: Hungary
- County: Bács-Kiskun
- District: Kalocsa

Area
  - Total: 53.18 km^{2} (20.53 sq mi)

Population (2015)
  - Total: 16,136
  - Density: 326.42/km^{2} (845.4/sq mi)
- Time zone: UTC+1 (CET)
  - Summer (DST): UTC+2 (CEST)
- Postal code: 6300
- Area code: (+36) 78
- Website: www.kalocsa.hu

Kalocsa (Hungarian pronunciation: [ˈkɒlot͡ʃɒ]; Croatian: Kaloča or Kalača; Serbian: Kaloča or Калоча; German: Kollotschau) is a town in Bács-Kiskun county, Hungary. It lies 142 km (88 mi) south of Budapest. It is situated in a marshy but highly productive district, near the left bank of the Danube River. Historically it had greater political and economic importance than at present.

== Description ==
Kalocsa is the Episcopal see of one of the four Catholic archbishops of Hungary. Amongst its buildings are a fine cathedral, the archiepiscopal palace, an astronomical observatory, a seminary for priests, and colleges for training teachers. The residents of Kalocsa and its wide-spreading communal lands are chiefly employed in the cultivation of paprika, fruit, flax, hemp and cereals, in the capture of waterfowl and in fishing.

Kalocsa is one of the oldest towns in Hungary. The present archbishopric, founded about 1135, is a development of a bishopric said to have been founded in 1000 by King Stephen the Saint. It suffered much during the 16th century from the invasions of Ottoman soldiers, who ravaged the country.

A large part of the town was destroyed by a fire in 1875, before buildings were constructed of more fireproof materials and when many used open fires for heating and cooking.

== History ==
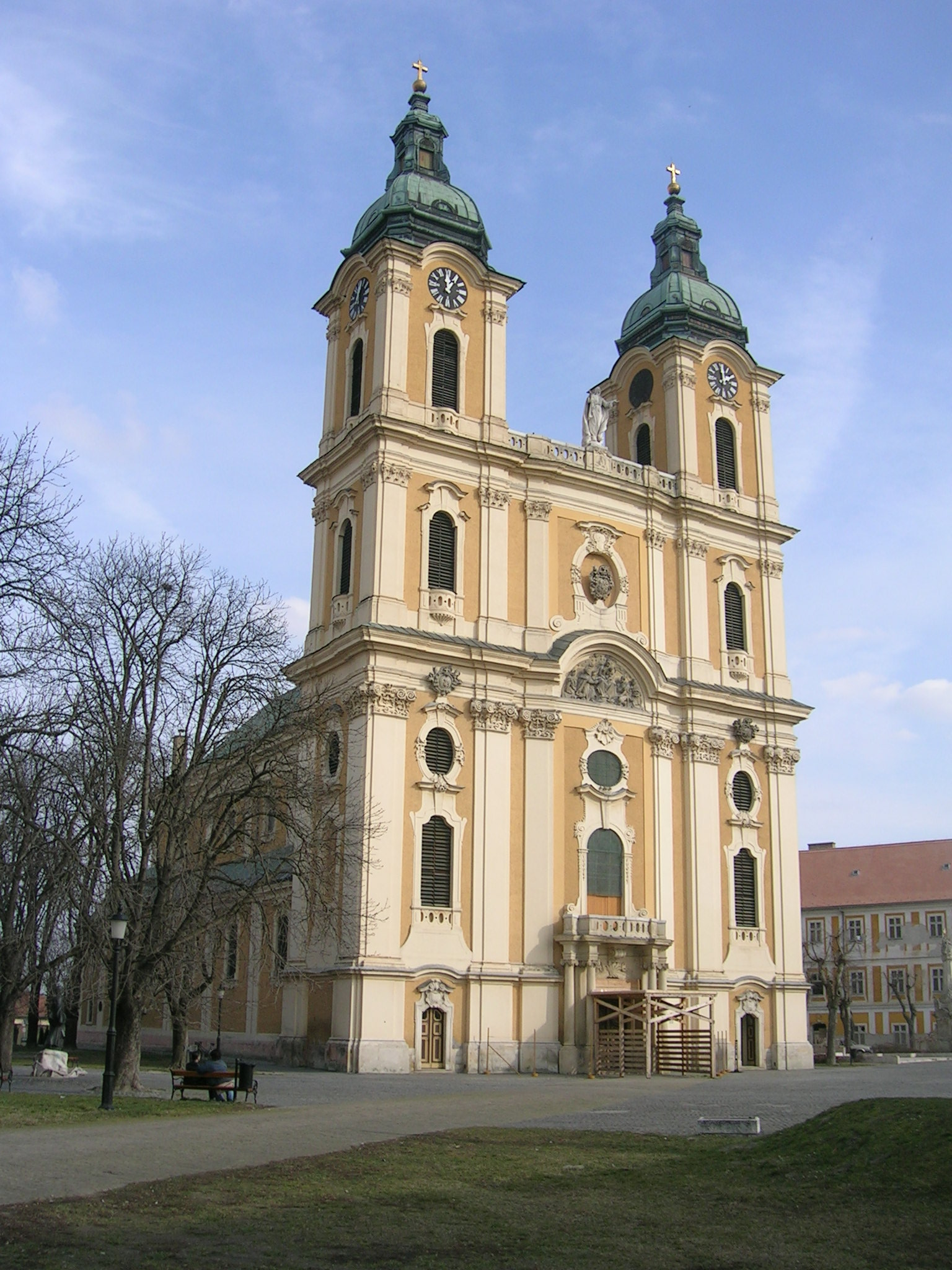
St. Mary Cathedral

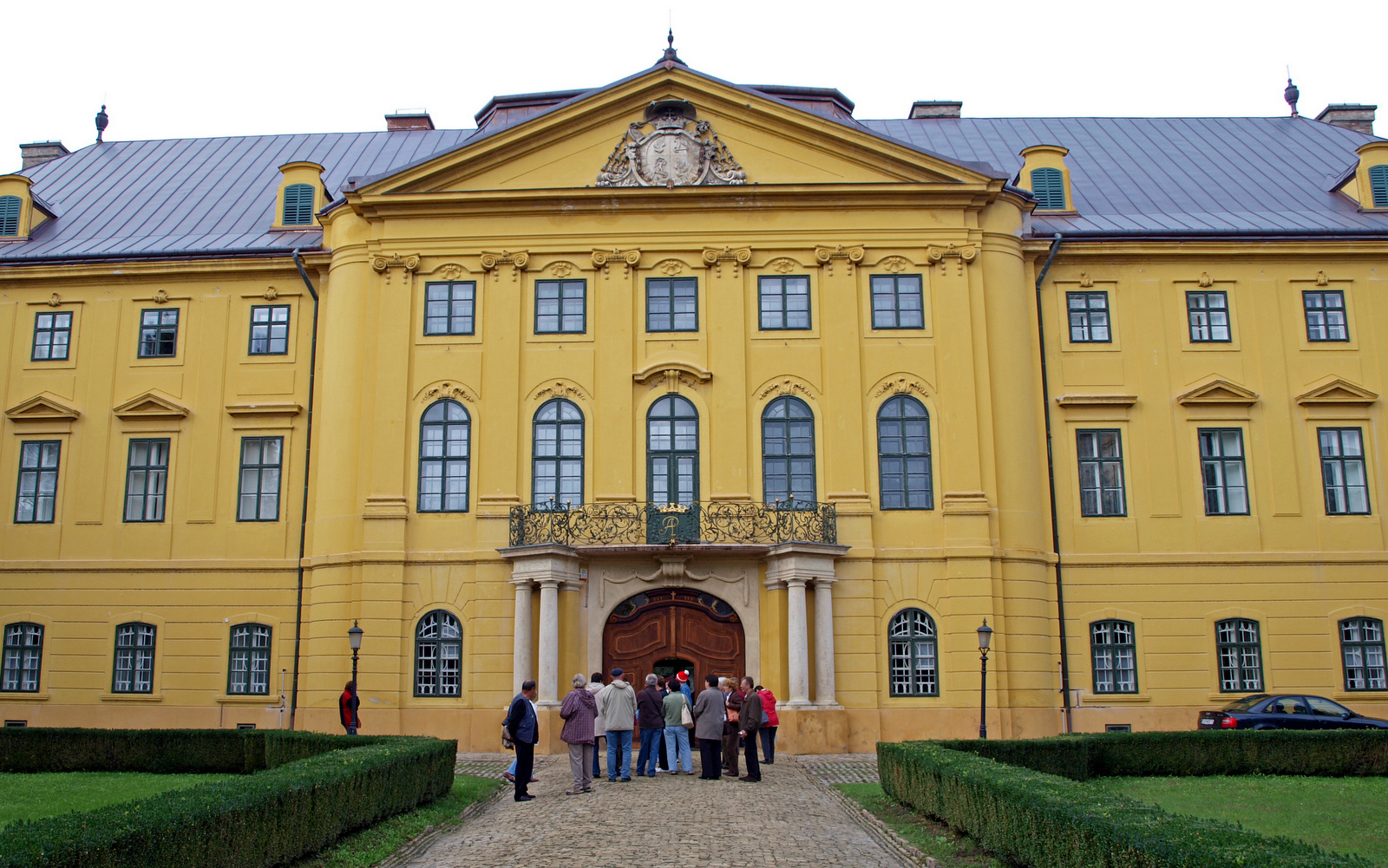
Archiepiscopal Palace

The Baroque provincial town in the Great Plain lies approximately 118 km (73 mi) south of Budapest on the east side of the Danube. The town is almost as old as the Hungarian state itself. After the Conquest, the tribe of Prince Árpád settled down here. Later, along with Esztergom, Kalocsa was an archdiocese founded by King Stephen in the early years of the Hungarian state. The first archbishop of the town was Asztrik, who brought the crown to Stephen from the Pope. In the first decade of the 11th century, the first church was built. In the Middle Ages history of Hungary, some archbishops served as generals due to prior secular careers in the military and a dearth of qualified commanders and were subsequently drafted by their secular princes. For example, Ugrin Csák (archbishop from 1219 till 1241) was the leader against the Tartars at the battle of Mohi 11 April 1241. Another significant general was Pál Tomori (who was archbishop from 1523 till 1526), the leader of the Hungarian army against the Ottomans. He was killed in an action at the battle of Mohács.

The Turks entered Kalocsa on August 15, 1529. With people of the town dispersed, nobody cultivated the lands, and the archiepiscopal status lost its importance. In 1602, Hungarian Calvinistic Haiduk burned down Kalocsa. After the 148 years lasting rule, on 13 October 1686 the Turks burnt down the castle of Kalocsa and withdrew their troops. Peace was delayed because of the uprising against the Habsburgs led by the Transylvanian Prince Ferenc Rákóczi II.

The returned archbishops tried to increase the population and attracted new residents. Cardinal Imre Csáki (1710–1732) recovered the lands for Kalocsa and its neighbours. They organized a large (about 23,000 hectares) territory, including marshlands, gardens, and vineyards near Kalocsa.

In the 18th century, the villeinage held the lands. The next class were the craftswomen and craftsmen. The first charter of incorporation was mentioned in 1737 in Kalocsa. In 1769 a total of 90 craftswomen and men lived in the town. Because of the clergy and the schools, the population had many educated people. Kalocsa became a centre in Hungary again but it did not recover the stature it had before the Ottoman invasion and occupation.

The industrial development of the 19th and 20th century did not come to Kalocsa. The railway was built too late, in 1882. Furthermore, in 1886 the town lost its rank of town, which was given back in 1921. Two great archbishops of the second part of the 19th century (József Kunszt 1851–1866 and Lajos Haynald 1867–1891) founded schools, so Kalocsa kept its importance.

At the beginning of the 20th century, the peasants were working for the archbishop or as navvies. During the counter-revolution of the Hungarian Soviet Republic, 20 people were hanged in the main street of the town.

During World War II, the Germans required the deportation of all the Jewish people in the summer of 1944. Most of them were murdered in the Nazi concentration camps. Some survivors returned after the end of the war, but the Jewish community never thrived again. Most Jews left for good. Communist authorities converted the synagogue into a public library. Changes in government in the late 20th century made people more willing to acknowledge this tragic history. In June 2009 the city council organized two days of events about the Jews of Kalocsa to celebrate their deportation.

In the 1950s the communist regime deprived the town of being subsidized by the state because of the archbishopric. The industrial development of the town started at the end of the 1960s. It resulted in changes in the lives of its residents and people in surrounding villages. Today Kalocsa is considered a picturesque small town, most of whose residents work there or on nearby lands.

== Main sights ==
One of the main attractions is the Holy Trinity Square (Szentháromság tér), named after the Holy Trinity column, which is standing next to the Cathedral. The column was made by Lipót Salm in 1786. On the pedestal can be seen St. John of Nepomuk, St. Sebastianus and St. Florian. Opposite the Cathedral is standing the statue of St. Stephen. It was erected by the town to the 950th anniversary of the king's death. Károly Kirchmayer and György Vadász made it. Behind this statue can be seen the War Memorial for the heroes of the World War I, a bronze statue, which is one of the works of Ferenc Sidló. The fourth statue of the square depicts Ferenc Liszt, the great Hungarian composer, who visited the town several times and Lajos Haynald archbishop.

Another attraction of the town is the high building of the Archbishops Cathedral standing in the middle of the Holy Trinity Square. The present church is the fourth built here. The first was built during the reign of King Stephen in the first decade of the 11th century by Asztrik. He was the first person who called himself archbishop in Kalocsa. He was also the one who brought the Holy Crown from Rome. This was the crown with which Hungary the Kingdom and the Hungarian nation was born. The second church was erected in the beginning of the 13th century and was destroyed by the Tatars. We are familiar with two of this church's stone carvings. One is a grave-stone cherishing the memory of the stonemason, Martinus Ravegu, and the other is a red marble king-head significant even in its fractions, being the most remarkable piece of sculpture from the age of the Árpáds (897–1301). The second church was rebuilt in Romanesque style during the reign of Louis the Great and burnt down in 1602 by the Protestant Hungarian Haiducks. That was the third. In the middle of the century the Turkish traveller, Evlia Tshelebi saw the remains, the inner walls of which were decorated with "beautiful colour paintings". The foundation of the present Italian-baroque style Cathedral was designed by the archbishop Imre Csáky. The foundation stone was laid by Gábor Patachich, also an archbishop, in 1735. The monument itself was designed by András Mayerhoffer. The two high towers of the Cathedral were burnt down because of stroke of lightning at the end of the 17th century. Because the changes of the 19th century made Gyula Városy archbishop (1905–1910) restore the church. It was made by two famous Hungarian architects, Ernő Foerk and Gyula Petrovácz. They built the crypt, too.

The two towers can be seen even from a great distance. Between them there is a connecting bridge on which are three statues: St Peter and Paul (1755) and in the middle Virgin Maria (János Hartmann, 1881). Under it there is a tympanum held by two Ionic columns. In the tympanum we can see a relief by József Andrejka. Its title is: Patrona Hungariae. On the south side of the Cathedral there is a relief of Asztrik, made by Jenő Bory, 1938. Being inside the Cathedral the visitor is fascinated by the golden, pink and white colours. The ceiling is decorated with stuccoes. This is one of the most beautiful decorations in Hungary. Setting out from the organ the visitor can see St Jeromos (he lived in the desert and translated the Holy Bible to Latin), St Ágoston (was a bishop, he is holding a burning heart in his hand), St Ambrus and St Gergely ( was a pope, he governed the church at the end of the ancient times). There is also a fresco about a triumphal cart, which is the symbol of the church and which is pulled by the badges of the four evangelists. The main altar was painted by Lipót Kupelweiser from Vienna in 1857. It depicts the Ascension of Virgin Mary. At the pillars of the triumphal arch there are two statues: St Stephen and St Ladislaus. The relief under Stephen depicts: Asztrik brings the crown to Stephen. The other relief under Ladislaus depicts: the foundation of the Chapter of Bács-County. The reliefs of the pedestal were carved by Miklós Izsó in 1864. The pulpit was made in 1752 in baroque style. At the top of it there is Jesus Christ. Around him the 4 evangelists can be seen and next to them there are their symbols (angle, lion, horn and eagle). The stained glass windows were made by Imre Zsellér and depict Hungarian saints: St Stephen with his coronation, St Ladislaus who brings water to the ground from rocks, St Margaret, St Elizabeth who gives alms to the poor people, St Imre, St Gellért who preaches the word of God, St John Kapisztrán who leads the Hungarian army against the Turkish troops and also can be seen St Adalbert who christened Stephen. One of the ornaments of the Cathedral is the organ which was built by the Angster Company from Pécs between 1876 and 1877. Even Ferenc Liszt played this organ. It has got 4668 pipes, 64 variations and 1 pedal. There are side-altars, too. Aching Virgin's altar with the body of a martyr, called St Pius. The body was taken to Kalocsa by Gábor Patachich's order from Roman catacombs on 11 July 1741. Next to the altar is the Guardian Angel's who takes a child under his/her wing because that little creature is fighting against snakes. There are also St Ferenc of Assis as well as St Peter's and Paul's altars. The last two altars show St John of Nepomuk who kept the confessions in secret in front of the Czech king and Stephen I can be seen when he educates his son.

To the rear of the Cathedral lies the Archbishop's Treasury. The medieval treasury was destroyed at the same time as the church, and many valuable pieces of art were lost. After the Turks were expelled from Hungary, Baroque art began to flourish in Hungary, including in Kalocsa. Therefore, the bulk of the articles displayed are products of the 18th and 19th century, while the few works of art predating this period serve as messengers of the former riches of the Hungarian Middle Ages and the Renaissance era.

=== The Archbishop's Palace ===
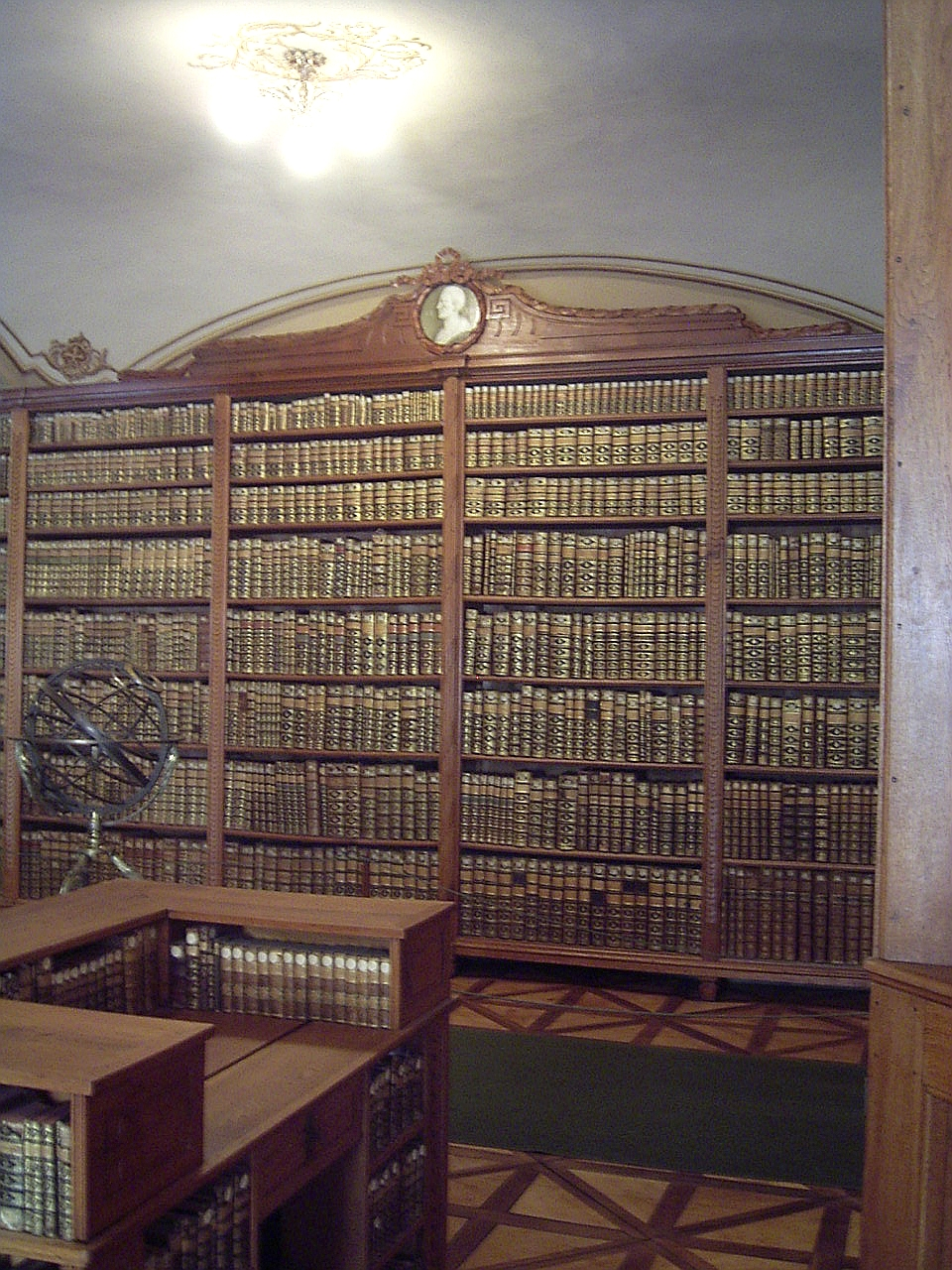
The Archiepiscopal Library in Kalocsa

There was a castle in the 14th century where the present building is now standing. It is a baroque-style monument, which was built in the 1760s. It stands to the north of the Cathedral. In the Palace the most visited premises are the Ceremonial Hall and the Archbishop's Library. In the Ceremonial Hall there are astronomical gadgets and maps from the Middle Ages. Here can be seen the first certified replica of the Hungarian Holy Crown with the sceptre and the orb. The frescoes in the Ceremonial Hall and on the ceiling of its chapel were done by Franz Anton Maulbertsch in 1783–84.

The Archbishops Library is based on the legacy of archbishop Ádám Patachich. It boasts 150,000 volumes which includes numerous partitives, codices, incunabula and bibles. The language of these books are: Latin, German as well as French and they have both theological and secular themes. Here can be seen one of the Bibles written by Martin Luther and there is also a collection of medals and coins. A rare volume is the oldest Hungarian Bible-translation, called: Vizsolyi Bible from 1540 (translated by Gáspár Károlyi). In the 19th century archbishop Lipót Kolonics ordered the volumes increased and that all books of the priests should be inherited by the Archbishops Library. Behind the Palace there is the Garden of the Archbishopric. It used to belong to the Palace with its valuable and varied plants. One part of it was given to the town as a present by Lajos Haynald. In this part there is an open-air theatre since 1962.

The Great Seminar's Baroque-style building lies to the south of the Holy Trinity Square. It was built between 1757 and 1764. Nowadays it works as the House of Culture of Kalocsa. Opposite the Main Cathedral the tourist can see the building of the Beta Hotel Kalocsa. It was built in the second part of the 18th century in baroque style for the house of the land-steward. Next to the Hotel the Home of the retired priests is working it was built in the 1770s. Every building in the Holy Trinity Square is yellow. It is because they were built during the reign of Maria Theresa and it was the queen's favourite colour. At Szt. István kir. st. 6 we find the unique Hungarian Paprika Museum. History and importance of paprika, the "red gold".

Nowadays paprika is one of the most characteristic spices of Hungarian cooking.

Its original home was probably Mexico and Central-America. They imported it to Europe at the same time as tobacco and potatoes. First it has been cultivated in Spain, later in Great-Britain and in the south of France. It was introduced by the Turks to Hungary. Our herbaria from the 16th century mentioned the paprika an "Indian pepper" or "Turkish pepper". In the beginning it became known as an exotic plant brought from the New World but its ingestion soon became very popular and in the 19th century on it is important as a commercial article, too.

The climate and soil of Szeged and Kalocsa are the most well known for producing paprika. Kalocsa as a settlement growing paprika is mentioned for the first time in a document of the Archiepiscopal Arch Eves of Kalocsa, dated 1729. From the middle of the 19th century paprika was not milling in ship-mills or dry mills because mills became operated by vapour gas, oil and electricity. Nowadays paprika is produced using the traditional methods. The exposition of the Paprika Museum shows the preparation and the sale.

The building of 2 Hunyadi st. was built by István Katona, the first historian of Kalocsa, between 1795 and 1796. Here has been placed the Archives of Archiepiscopal Farming and the Collection of the Fine arts of Kalocsa.

The Asztrik Square is named after the first archbishop of Kalocsa (see the history part of this text). The building of the Convent is surrounded by horse-chestnuts. Its north side-wing with the church was built in 1860. The second floor was put on in 1913 and since that time it got its romantic shape. József Kunszt archbishop (1851–1866) called from Czech the sisters who had named themselves after Virgin Mary. They founded a school here which included a primary part for girls only, a teacher-training college and a training college for nursery-school teachers. This institute was one of the centres of the Hungarian girls' boarding schools. After World War II and secularization, the buildings worked as a school of music, an agricultural secondary school and a students' hall of residence for girls only.

Behind the Convent there used to stand the Archiepiscopal farm-buildings. In the big stable there could have been a maximum of 300 horses. The four-towers building was already standing in 1772. The four-storey Granary is as old as the stable. They are specialities because of their sizes and age. Going to the South from the Holy Trinity Square the visitor can see the statue of Pál Tomori (archbishop and general who died at the battle of Mohács against the Turks in 1526) behind the Prosecutor's Office of the Town. Next to the statue we find the building of the Teachers' Training College, founded in 1856 by József Kunszt, which is working now as a secondary school for health workers.

Very significant was the town scape of the building of the Small Seminar (Szt. István kir. st. 12–14) which is connected the House of the Jesuit holy order by the Bridge of Sighs. The Jesuits had a church, a grammar/high school and a college, called Stefaneum, in the enormous building. The grammar school was founded by József Batthyány in 1765. The building complex have been ready by 1869. On the top of this building was founded the 18th observatory in the world. Its first astronomer was Gyula Fényi. The grammar school had a lot of famous scientist teachers and students. Today it is named after St Stephen.

At Szt. István kir. st. 25 is a former school building erected in 1886 which is today the home of the Viski Károly Museum. The institute, named after a local ethnographer, is mainly devoted to portraying the life of the Swabian, Slovak, Serbian and Hungarian people of the region. It also traces the history of Kalocsa's renowned women folk painters. In addition there is also a specialist coin collection.

Some way along Szt. István kir. st. 35 is the Town Hall, built in 1912 in eclectic style. Opposite it there is standing the building of the Court of district law. At No. 76 in Szt. István st. there is the Schöffer Miklós Museum, which displays the kinetic mobiles and installations of locally born Nicolas Schöffer (1912–1992), who spent much of his life in Paris. His metallic light tower, called Chronos 8, is standing at the far end of the main street, by the bus station.

In 1999, a part of the Szt. István kir. st. had been closed away from cars. It became and used it now as a pedestrianized street. At the cross of the Grősz József st. and the Szt. István st. we find the newest statue in the town but indeed it is a fountain. It's a memorial of the Crown of Hungary. Around it we can see the Maltese cross. Anyway, other statues of archbishops are planned to erect along the street: Asztrik, Ugrin Csák, József Batthyány, Ádám Patachich, József Kunszt, Lajos Haynald and Archbishop József Grősz (one of the defendants in a show trial after the events of 1956).

Kossuth Lajos street also opens from the Holy Trinity Square to the North-East. You can walk besides buildings from the 19th and 20th century. At No. 14–16 we can see the "House of teachers", built in 1897, which is a secondary school today. Walking along down the street we reach the enormous building complex of the Hospital of Kalocsa. The hospital was founded by László Kollonits (archbishop from 1787 to 1817). The new hospital opened with twelve beds on 7 June 1868. It was finally completed in 1948–1957.

== Notable people ==
- Ladislaus I of Hungary
- Nicolaus Olahus
- Alíz Derekas
- József Szabó von Szentmiklós
- Pál Tomori
- Matthias Bel
- Gyula Fényi
- Ivan Antunović
- Ivan Frankopan Cetinski
- István Kiss
- József Angster
- Laszlo Csaba
- Franz Anton Maulbertsch
- Imre Csáky
- Blaško Rajić
- Lajos Haynald
- Miklós Vámos
- Joseph Maria Pernter
- Ladislaus Kán
- Dávid Pákolicz
- Attila Sánta
- Tivadar Batthyány
- Róbert Alföldi
- Kalocsai, Kalocsay families

== Sport ==
- Kalocsai FC, association football club
- TFSE Kalocsa, volleyball team

== Twin towns – sister cities ==
Kalocsa is twinned with:

- Altino, Italy
- Bethlehem, Palestine
- Cristuru Secuiesc, Romania
- Kirchheim unter Teck, Germany
- Kula, Serbia
- Totana, Spain

== See also ==
- Archdiocese of Kalocsa
