= Kalocsai =

Kalocsai or Kalocsay (meaning "from Kalocsa") is a surname. Notable people with the surname include:

== Kalocsai ==
- Henrik Kalocsai (1940–2012), Hungarian jumper

== Kalocsay ==
- Géza Kalocsay (1913–2008), Hungarian football player and manager
- Kálmán Kalocsay (1891–1976), Hungarian Esperanto poet, translator and editor who also used the name Peter Peneter
