= Moritz Hörnes =

Austrian geologist and paleontologist (1815–1868)

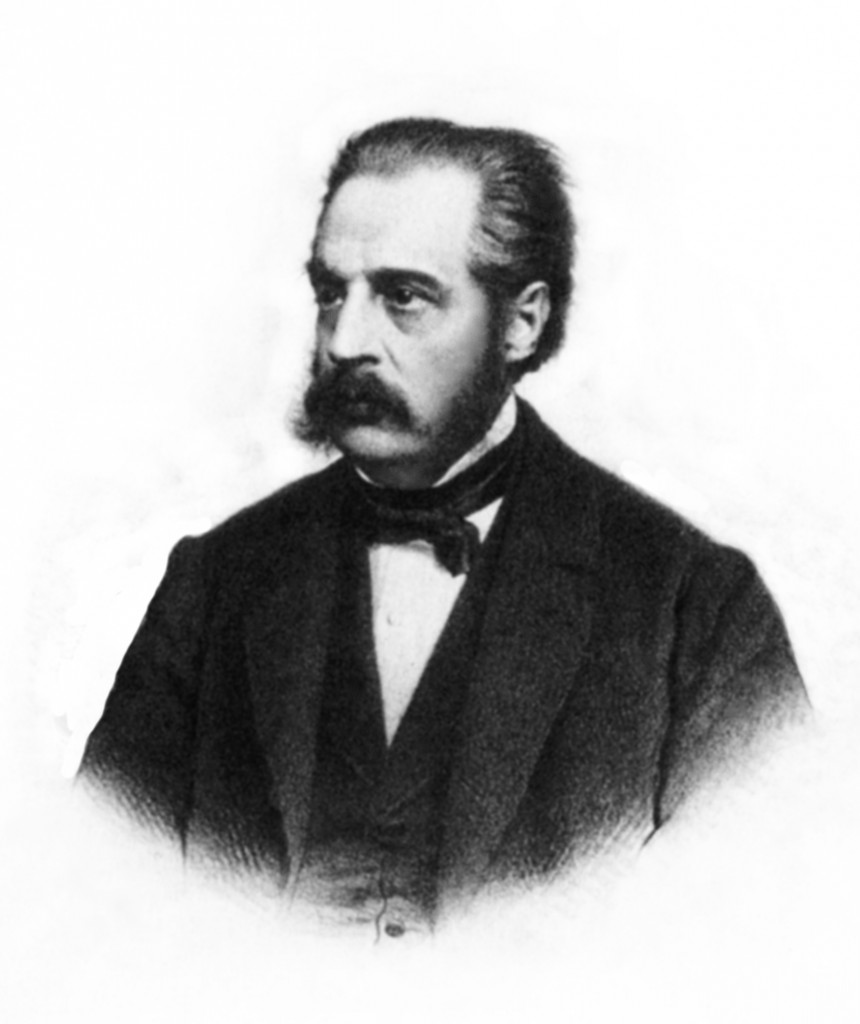
Moriz Hoernes

Moritz Hörnes (14 July 1815 – 4 November 1868) was an Austrian palaeontologist. He was the curator of the imperial natural history cabinet of Vienna. His son Rudolf Hoernes also became a geologist and paleontologist while another son Moritz Hoernes (1852–1917) became an archaeologist.

Hörnes was born in Vienna, he was educated at the University of Vienna and graduated with a PhD. He then became an assistant in the Vienna mineralogical museum under Paul Maria Partsch. He was distinguished for his research on the Cenozoic Mollusca of the Vienna Basin and of Alpine regions. Most of his memoirs were published in the Jahrbuch der K. K. geol. Reichsanstalt. After the death of Partsch, he became the curator of the natural history cabinet.

In 1864 he introduced the term Neogene to include Miocene and Pliocene, as these formations are not always to be clearly separated: the fauna of the lower division being subtropical and gradually giving place in the upper division to Mediterranean forms. He died in Vienna on 4 November 1868.

In 1860 the mineral hörnesite was named in his honor by Wilhelm Haidinger, with Gustav Adolph Kenngott being its co-describer.

The Florentine Diamond was properly weighed and documented and a plaster copy made of it under his supervision.

He married Aloisia, née Strauss, niece of Paul Maria Partsch, who had another sister who was married the geologist Eduard Suess. Another sister of Aloisia was married to Johann August Natterer (1821–1900). His son Dr. Rudolf Hörnes (1850–1912), professor of geology and palaeontology in the University of Graz, also carried on researches among the Cenozoic mollusca, and is author of Elemente der Palaeontologie (1884).
