= József Szabó de Szentmiklós =

Hungarian geologist (1822–1894)

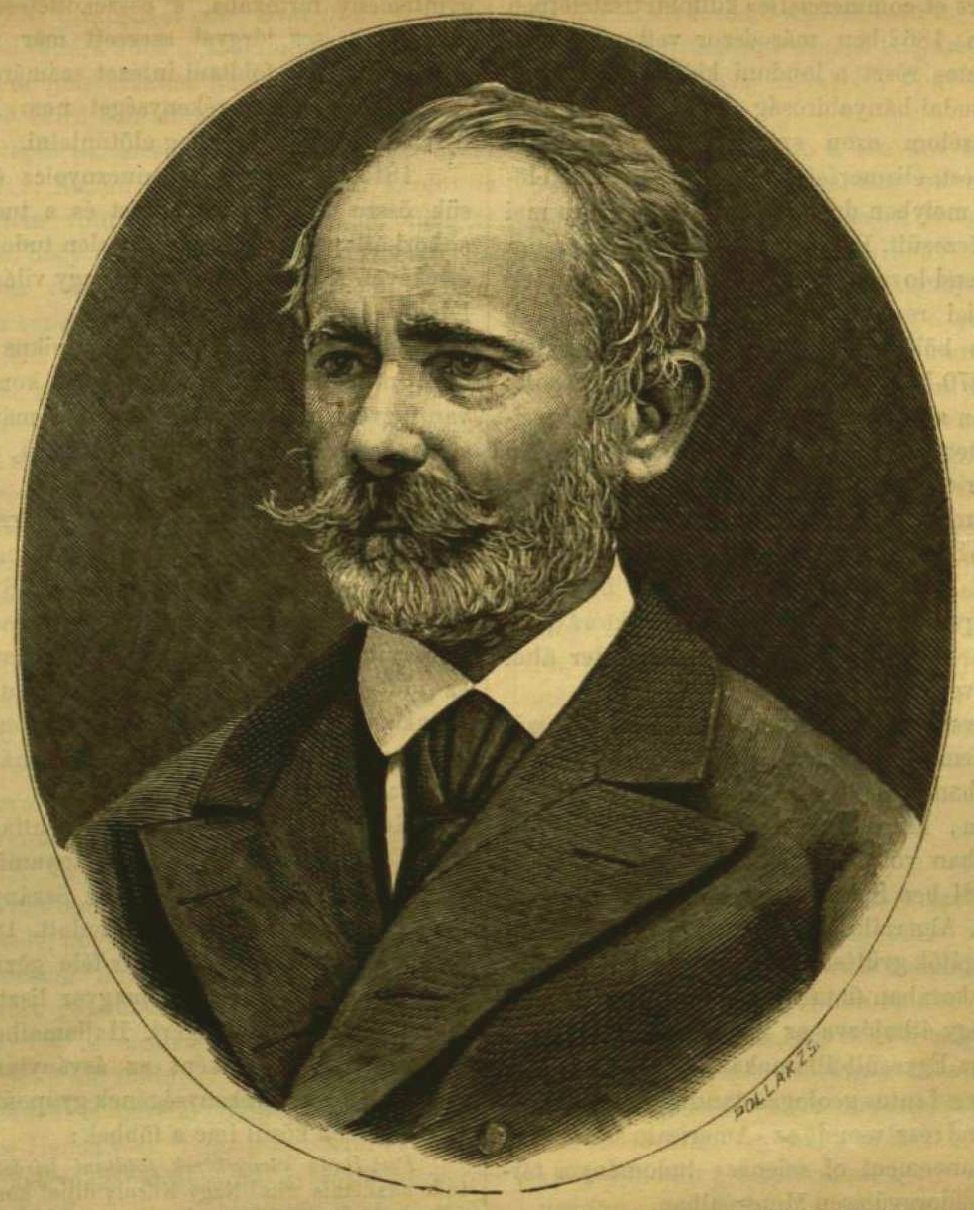
József Szabó

József Szabó de Szentmiklós (14 March 1822 – 10 April 1894), Hungarian geologist, was born at Kalocsa. He was the brother of Ferenc Szabó.

== Background ==
His first contribution to science was an essay on metallurgy, in which subject he had received special training. Afterwards he settled at Budapest and investigated the geology of the district, the results of which were published in a geological map (1858). In 1859 he joined the staff of the Austrian Geological Survey as a volunteer member, and paid attention to the economic as well as to the purely scientific aspects of the work. He also arranged for surveys having special reference to agricultural geology to be undertaken by the Hungarian Geological Institute. In 1862 he became professor of geology and mineralogy in the University of Budapest.

In later years he devoted himself largely to petrology, and published memoirs on the trachytes of Hungary and Transylvania; on a new method of determining the species of feldspars in rocks, depending on fusibility and flame-coloration; on the geology and petrology of the district of Schemnitz; and on Santorin Island. He died in Budapest on 10 April 1894.

== Published works ==
- Geologie mit besonderer Rüchsicht auf die Petrographie, den Vulkanismus u. die Hydrographie (1883).
