= Johannes Ude =

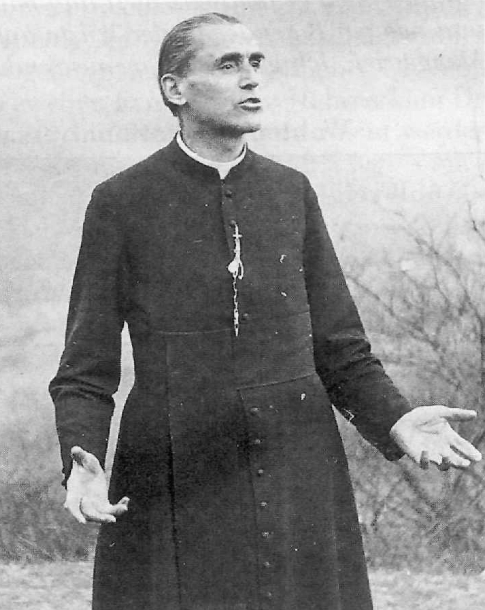
In 1930

Johannes Ude (28 February 1874 – 7 July 1965) was a German priest, zoologist, botanist, paleontologist, philosopher, pacifist, and ethicist. He had four doctorates and served as a professor of speculative dogmatics at the University of Graz. He joined the Nazi party in 1933 but was imprisoned by the Nazi government for protesting against the war and the persecution of Jews in 1939 and again in 1944.

== Life and work ==
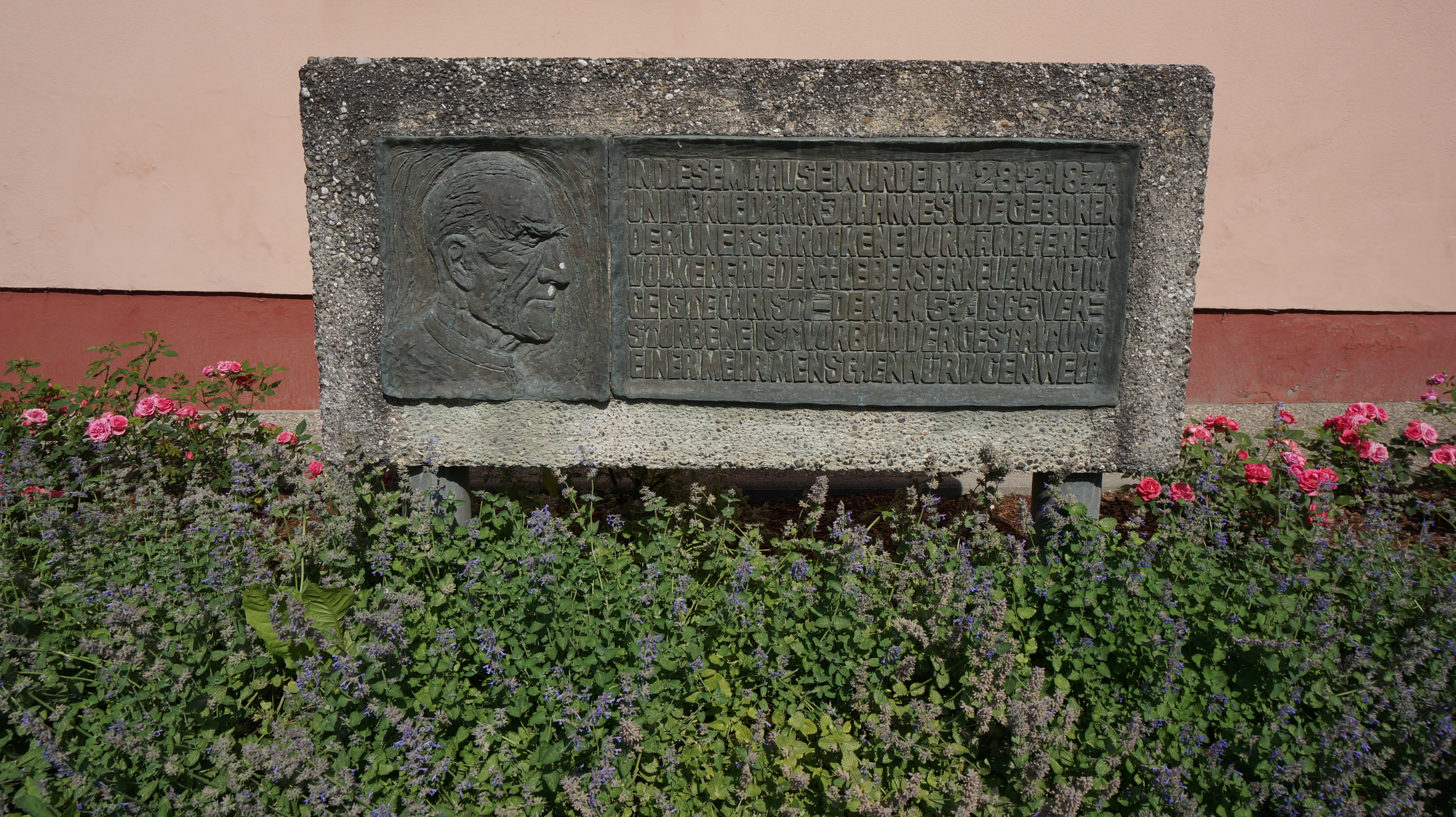
Memorial in Sankt Kanzian

Ude was born in St. Kanzian, the son of school-teacher Peter and Hedwig née Bresnigg. The family moved to St. Margarethen (Styria) in 1876 and he studied at the Benedictine Abbey at Sankt Lambrecht. He then studied in Graz at the Oberrealgymnasium Lichtenfels, graduating in 1894. He then went to the Gregoriana University in Rome and studied theology and philosophy, receiving a doctorate in philosophy in 1897 and in theology in 1901. He was ordained priest in 1900 and he worked as a chaplain in Fernitz near Graz and then at Hausmannstätten. He then worked at a boy's seminary in Graz until 1910 teaching Italian and serving as prefect. He also studied paleontology, zoology and botany, receiving a doctorate in 1907 for his work on freshwater flatworms. He became a professor of speculative dogmatics, teaching christian philosophy and apologetics from 1917 to 1936 at the University of Graz. While serving as a docent in 1908, he debated the geologist Rudolf Hoernes in a series of letters in the local press which related to the Kepler Society. The Christian social newspaper “Grazer Volksblatt” and a German-liberal papers “Grazer Tagblatt” and “Grazer Tagespost” supported each of the two. Ude supported a Christian view on the origin of the Earth while Hoernes supported Darwinism and noted that the search for truth cannot be based on dogma, majoritarianism, or authority. Ude served as dean of the faculty of theology in 1924-25. He turned vegetarian from 1907 and founded a non-smoking, non-drinking dining house in Graz. During World War I he served as a paramedic. He became an activist against prostitution and alcoholism and in 1924 he organized a world congress against the trafficking of girls in Graz. In 1921 he met Pope Benedict XV and in 1926 he founded the "Wirtschaftsverein für Österreich" (or "Ude Party") which followed the ideas of Silvio Gesell. In 1933 he joined the NSDAP and in 1939 he was interned by the Nazis in Linz for his opposition to the war and for protesting the persecution of Jews. He was freed but arrested again in August 1944 in Wels for favouring the enemy. He was freed following the liberation of Nazi Germany by Allied powers.

Ude was proposed for the Nobel Peace Prize twelve times. He gave lectures as a pacifist and wrote numerous letters. His most noted work was "Du sollst nicht töten" which was translated into English as "You shall not kill" in 2016 which he argued that while the Catholic Church considered it moral to reject abortion, suicide, euthanasia, and sterilization, it justified the death penalty and "defensive wars". Ude argued that Christianity did not permit any such exceptions. He wrote the book in secret during the Nazi era and the German version was published in 1962.
