= Falbe =

Falbe is a surname. Notable people with the surname include:

- Christian Tuxen Falbe (1791–1849), Danish naval officer, archaeologist, and diplomat
- Hans Hagerup Falbe (1772–1830), Norwegian lawyer, judge and government official
- Ida Falbe-Hansen (1849–1922), Danish educator, philologist and women's activist
- Joachim Martin Falbe (1709–1782), German portrait painter
- Raleigh W. Falbe (1890–1957), American politician from Milwaukee

== See also ==
- Falbe Punic inscriptions, Punic inscriptions, found by Christian Tuxen Falbe
- Kendra Falby, a Canadian former college softball player
- Falb, a surname
