= Lajos Haynald =

Hungarian Archbishop, naturalist and cardinal

His Eminence Lajos Haynald
- Metropolitan Archbishop of Kalocsa
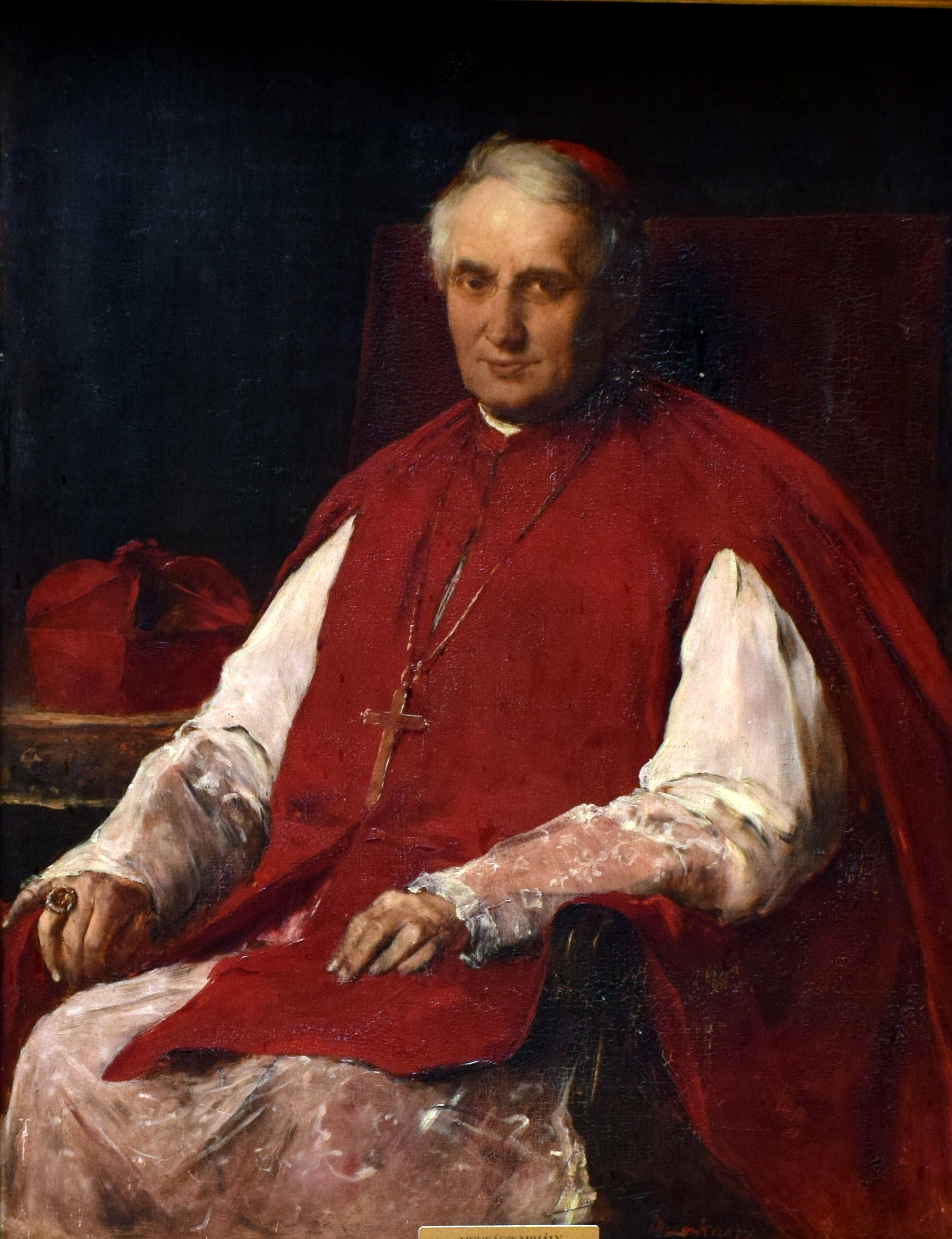
- Lajos Haynald, 1886 portrait by Mihály Munkácsy
- Archdiocese: Kalocsa
- See: Kalocsa
- Installed: 17 May 1867
- Term ended: 4 July 1891
- Predecessor: Jószef Krivinai Lonovics
- Successor: Juraj Császka
- Other post: Cardinal-priest of Santa Maria degli Angeli
- Previous posts: Coadjutor bishop of Transylvania (1852); Titular bishop of Hebron (1852); Bishop of Transylvania (1852-1864); Titular archbishop of Carthage (1864-1867)

Orders
- Ordination: 15 October 1839
- Consecration: 15 August 1852 by János Scitovszky
- Created cardinal: 12 May 1879 by Pope Leo XIII
- Rank: Cardinal-priest

Personal details
- Born: October 3, 1816 Szécsény, Kingdom of Hungary, Austrian Empire
- Died: July 4, 1891 (aged 74) Kalocsa, Austria-Hungary
- Denomination: Roman Catholic
- Motto: Patiendo mereri

Stephan Franz Lajos (or Ludwig) Haynald (October 3, 1816, at Szécsény – July 3, 1891, at Kalocsa) was a Hungarian Archbishop of Kalocsa-Bács, naturalist, and cardinal.

== Life ==
Having completed his studies in the secondary schools, he entered the Emericianum at Pozsony (Presburg) in 1830, remaining there for one year. He studied philosophy at Nagyszombat (Tyrnau) in 1831, theology at Vienna in 1833; entered holy orders on 15 October 1839, and received the degree of Doctor of Theology in 1841.

After a brief period spent in pastoral work, he became professor of theology at the seminary at Esztergom in 1842. The prince-primate, József Kopácsy, appointed him his secretary in 1846, but before he had entered upon the duties of that office, dispatched him abroad to study the training of pastors and ecclesiastical administration. Haynald probably was the first Hungarian to study such subjects in foreign countries. He passed most of the time that he spent on his mission in Paris.

On his return he was appointed chancellor-director to the prince-primate, early in 1848. When the Hungarian parliament proclaimed the independence of Hungary on 14 April 1849, Haynald refused to publish this declaration. The consequence was that he lost his position, whereupon he returned to his birthplace Szécsény. At the close of the Revolutionary War he was restored to his office; on 15 September 1851, he was appointed coadjutor to the Bishop of Transylvania, Nicholas Kovács, whom he succeeded on 15 October 1852.

On 2 May 1859, Haynald made an ad limina visit to the Vatican, where he appealed unsuccessfully for Transylvania to be promoted to an archdiocese.

On the publication of the October diploma, in 1860, Haynald became one of the champions of the union of Transylvania with Hungary. His political opinions and activity thereupon brought him into conflict with the Viennese Government. Count Francis Nádasdy, head of the Transylvanian Chancellery, accused Haynald of disloyalty. Haynald went to Vienna and presented a memorial in which he set forth his political views. Notwithstanding this, the dissensions between the Government and Haynald continued, and resulted in Haynald's resignation in 1864.

Pope Pius IX summoned him to Rome and appointed him titular archbishop of Carthage.

Until 1867, he was in Rome as a member of the Congregation for Extraordinary Ecclesiastical Affairs. After the restoration of the Hungarian constitution, Haynald was appointed Archbishop of Kalocsa-Bács, in 1867, at the insistence of Baron Joseph Eötvös.

He played an important part in the First Vatican Council of 1870, being, with George Strossmayer, Bishop of Diakovár, one of the foremost opponents of the dogma of papal infallibility, although he submitted to the decree of the council. Pope Leo XIII made Haynald a cardinal on 12 May 1879. Pope Leo gave him his red galero and assigned him the titular church of Santa Maria degli Angeli e dei Martiri on 22 September.

As bishop and archbishop, he aimed chiefly to maintain ecclesiastical discipline and to raise the standard of studies in the public schools. His bequests amounted to nearly five million florins. While still a young priest, he devoted himself to botany and made a large collection of plants and of books, which subsequently came into the possession of the Hungarian National Museum. The Hungarian Academy of Sciences made him an honorary member.
