= Karl Alfons Penecke =

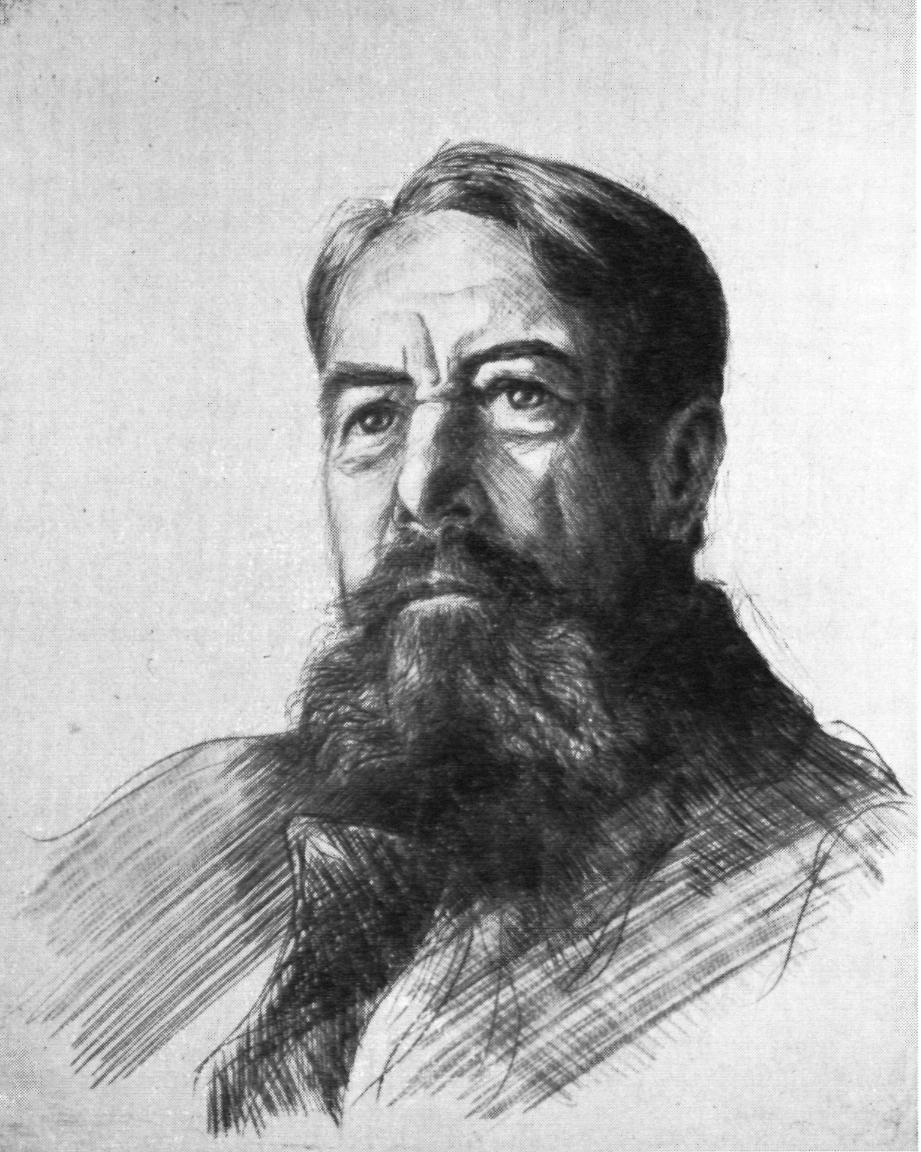
Sketch by Ida Penecke-Buxbaum, 1922

Karl Alfons Borromäus Josef Penecke (28 April 1858 – 1944?) was an Austro-Hungarian geologist, paleontologist at the University of Graz. He was also a keen entomologist with an interest in the beetles of the Styrian region. He went missing in Cernăuți (Czernowitz), Romania, at the end of World War II.

== Life and work ==
Penecke was born in Graz, where his father Karl was an imperial officer. His mother was Baroness Hermine Sluga of Rastenfeld. His sister Emilie (1859–1944) married Angelo von Jedina and was a noted botanical artist. He studied at the gymnasium in Tummelplatz run by Benedictine monks. He studied at the University of Graz from 1877 and received a doctorate in 1883. His dissertation was on the fossil fauna of the Slavonian Paludine beds. He studied under Constantin von Ettingshausen and Rudolf Hoernes. He studied philosophy under Alois Riehl. He was a member of the student fraternity "Arminia". He habilitated in geology and paleontology in 1886 and taught at the University of Graz, becoming an associate professor in 1901. He headed the geological paleontological institute at the University of Czernowitz from 1909, becoming a full professor in 1918. When the International Geological Congress was held in Vienna in 1903, he led excursions to Miocene and Paleozoic strate in central Styria. He worked on stratigraphy based on mollusc fauna, corals and other paleontological studies. In 1908, he described the genus Verbeekia from the Permian of Timor. He also took an independent interest in beetles that he had from an early age. He had noted that his own father had taken an interest in breeding Acherontia atropos. He was particularly interested in the weevils of the Styria - Carinthia region and the cave fauna. Along with other entomologists in the region, he had been involved in founding the Styrian natural history society in 1902, led by Professor Ludwig von Graff. He examined weevils and their plant hosts. His weevil collection is now held at the state museum in Dresden and a part of it was donated to the University of Czernowitz. During World War I, in 1914, he moved from Czernowitz to Graz due to the Russian occupation. He returned in 1918 to Cernăuți under the Romanian government. He was made state councillor and awarded a star of Romania. When World War II was impending, he left Cernăuți again and went to Altheide-Bad in Silesia. He decided to return to Romania in 1941 and stopped at Annabert near Ratibor. His son Richard who worked as a contract pathologist for the Wehrmacht was able to visit him. He went for walks on the hillside and in 1942 he moved to Gleiwitz and then to Cernăuți in January 1943. He moved back to his old home. In February 1944, the town was occupied by Russian troops and nothing was heard of from Penecke again.

Penecke married Ottilie Klara (1864–1932) daughter of imperial officer Josef Leodegar Canaval, curator of the natural history museum in Klagenfurt and Ottilie von Rosthorn. Penecke named several fossil species after his wife including the coral Favosites ottiliae, the bivalve Unio ottiliae, the snails Natica ottiliae and Valvata ottiliae; and the sea urchin Ottiliaster pusillus. The triclade Rhynchodemus peneckei was named after him. His son Richard became a medical doctor. Son Ernst married Ida Buxbaum who was an artist who made a portrait of Penecke in 1922.
