= Rudolf Falb =

Austrian popularizer of natural history (1838–1903)

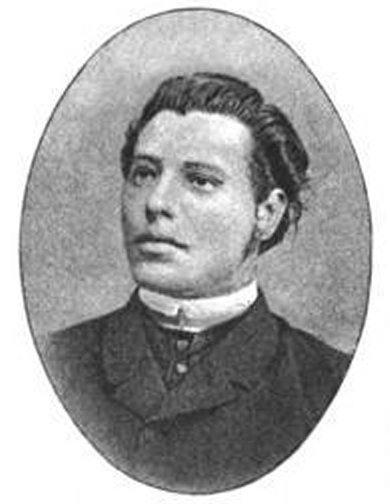
Rudolf Falb

Rudolf Falb (14 April 1838, Obdach (Styria, Austrian Empire – 29 September 1903, Schöneberg, German Empire) was an Austrian popularizer of natural history who concerned himself with earthquakes, meteorology, astronomy and also with evolutionary linguistics. He developed the lunisolar flood hypothesis of earthquakes and volcanism, based on the concept of subterranean lava tides, which the academic community thoroughly refuted even during his lifetime; nevertheless he attained considerable popularity through apparently correct predictions of several seismic events and through numerous failed predictions including the end of the world through the collision of Biela's Comet. Falb's lasting legacy is that he popularized the concept of extraterrestrial influences of geophysical phenomena, even though his concepts regarding the origins of earthquakes were wrong.

== Priest and teacher ==
Falb was born in Obdachegg parish of Obdach. His father Franz Falb was a miner turned miller, the owner of the Stübler Mill married to Maria née Weer. Following the early death of his father, he was sponsored by a local school teacher to attend school at the Benedictine monk-run Saint Lambert's Abbey and then studied theology at the University of Graz. He was ordained as a Catholic priest in 1862 and briefly served as a chaplain in Kainach bei Voitsberg and then in pastoral care. However he soon became a teacher for religion and German language at the merchants' academy in Graz where Peter Rosegger was one of his pupils. Rosegger was particularly captivated by Falb's lectures on the skies and the stars in 1865–66. Falb and Adalbert Svoboda were major influences on Rosegger's life even after his school days. Falb became estranged from Catholicism during this time, renouncing his priesthood in 1866. From 1868 he began to give public lectures on astronomy. He converted to Protestantism in 1872.

== The lunisolar flood theory ==
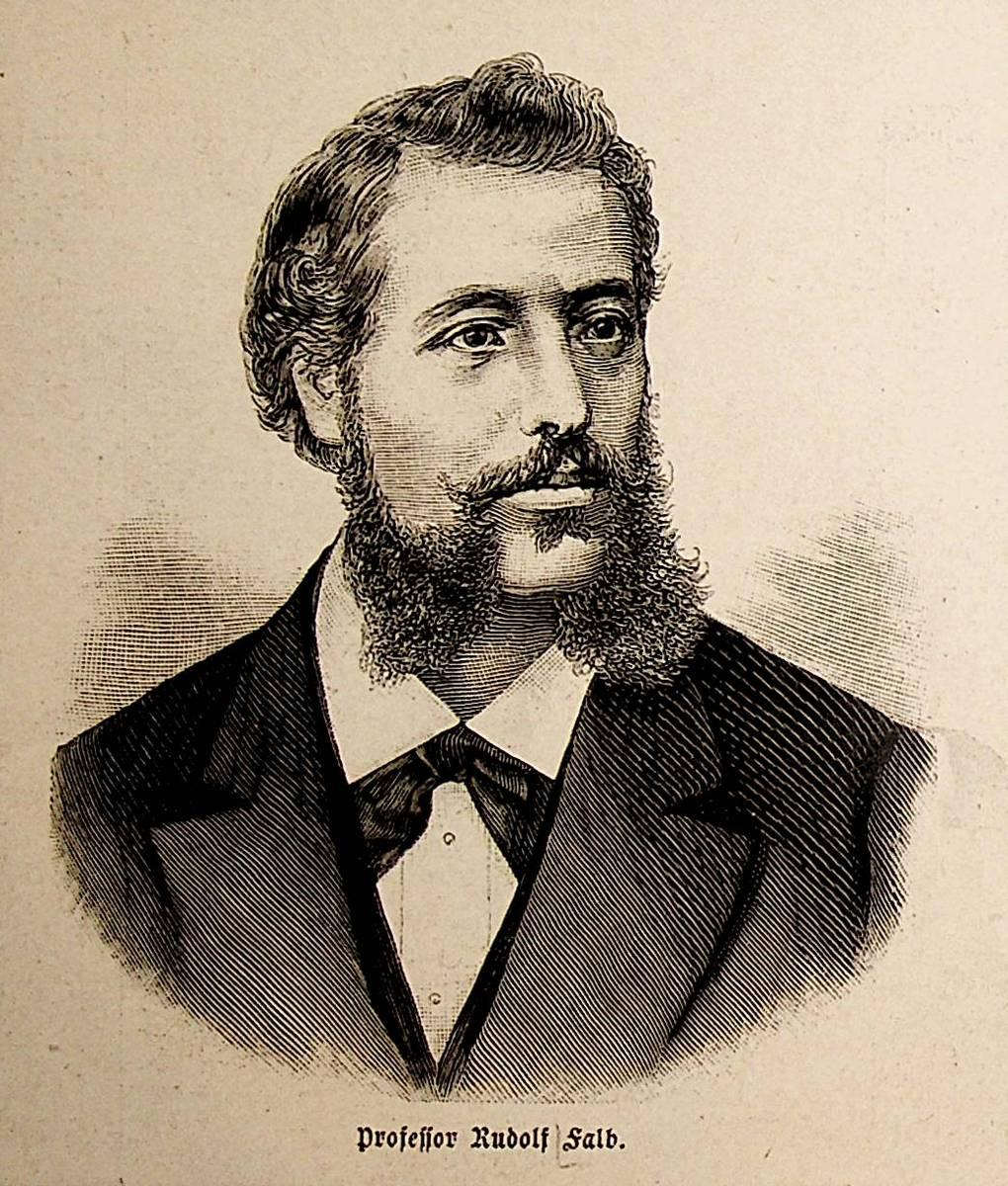

Falb relocated to Prague where he obtained a tutor position in a noble family. This supplied him with sufficient funds to study mathematics, physics and astronomy at the Charles University, and later geology at the University of Vienna. There is no record of him having obtained an academic degree at either institution.

In 1868 Falb started the popular astronomy magazine, Sirius and began to develop his "lunisolar flood theory", published in 1869. He also gave lectures across Europe, giving 108 talks in the winter of 1876-77 alone. A central point of this hypothesis stated earthquakes to be caused by tidal forces acting on subterranean lakes of lava (causing earthquakes) and its upwelling through the Earth's crust (causing volcanic eruptions). The strength of these forces being predictable from the positions of the Sun and the Moon relative to each other, Falb proceeded to postulate "Critical Days" during which geophysical disasters should be more likely to occur. Subsequently, he extended this hypothesis, which initially had strong connections to ideas put forward by the French mathematician Alexis Perrey, to include long-term weather forecasting. Falb's hypothesis gained a high public profile when he made predictions that seemed to come true with the 1873 Belluno earthquake and an eruption at Mount Aetna in 1874.

However, the fundamental flaws of this hypothesis were the typical ones that disqualify it as a scientific theory—namely, insufficient specificity and precision of the predictions in relation to statistically expected levels, and inherent irrefutability, the combined effect being non-falsifiability. Falb considered days on which the moon was either full or new or in its nodal positions (i.e., four days per month) to be "Critical Days." To this were added the days of the equinox (2 per year), and the days when Earth was in the apical positions of its orbit (2 per year). Because Falb proceeded to claim each of these days to be preceded and followed by 2–3 days which he also considered critical (though less so), about a third of all days of the year met some criteria of "criticality" according to the lunisolar hypothesis. Moreover, by stating the actual occurrence of the predicted events not to be mandatory, Falb immunized himself against failures while he could (and would) always claim successes as being in support of his hypothesis—a characteristic hallmark of predictions in pseudoscience.

Falb also met the most determined resistance from the scientific establishment on geophysical grounds. Among his most determined and outspoken academic opponents were one of the founders of seismotectonics, Rudolf Hoernes in Graz, the director of the Austrian Meteorological Service, Josef M. Pernter in Innsbruck, and the British inventor of the modern seismograph, John Milne.

This formidable and sustained scientific opposition notwithstanding, Falb influenced public opinion regarding seismic phenomena to such a degree that the two major German encyclopedias - the Brockhaus Enzyklopädie and Meyers Konversations-Lexikon - both mentioned Falb and his theory in editions published during the late 19th century. He also gained a degree of notability in the English-speaking world. In London Murray's Magazine published an appraisal of his earthquake predictions which was reprinted by The New York Times.

== Americas travel and linguistic hypotheses ==
In 1877 Falb traveled to South America to study volcanic phenomena and became so fascinated with the native ethnic culture that he stayed much longer than he had planned. He travelled from Chile to the Inca city of Cuzco, Lake Titicaca and then to Bolivia. While in Bolivia he became a favorite of president Hilarión Daza but had to leave the country when Daza was removed from office in 1879. After interludes in California and New York, Falb returned to Austria but then moved on to Leipzig where he married Petrine von Labitschburg, a primary school teacher. There he opened up another front of controversy in 1883–1888 when he published books (including Estudio sobre los templores de tierra en la historia del universo) on the Inca civilization, postulating languages such as Aimara and Quechua to be the "original languages of mankind" and linking them to the Semitic languages. These writings did not gain the broad publicity which the lunisolar flood theory continued to enjoy. He travelled from Panama to San Francisco in 1879 and fell ill with arthritis and conjunctivitis. He was attended to at the German Hospital in San Francisco thanks to Rudolf Hochkofler and Friedrich Hess. He returned to Vienna in 1880.

== Later years ==
In 1880 there was an earthquake in Zagreb on the 9th of November and he was able to predict an afershock on the 16th of December. Falb married Petrine von Labitschburg, a school teacher in 1880. He was forced to move to Leipzig in order to marry and he also renounced his Austrian citizenship. They had four sons and a daughter.

Although increasingly affected by a paralytic spinal disease, Falb continued to publish "Critical Day" calendars (from 1888 onward) and other writings which became increasingly eccentric, including deluge myths and ice ages. With his wife and their five children he spent the following 15 years under increasingly dire economic conditions relocating between Berlin, his native town Obdach, Leipzig, and finally Berlin again where Rudolf Falb died in 1903, at an age of 65 years.
