= Paul Maria Partsch =

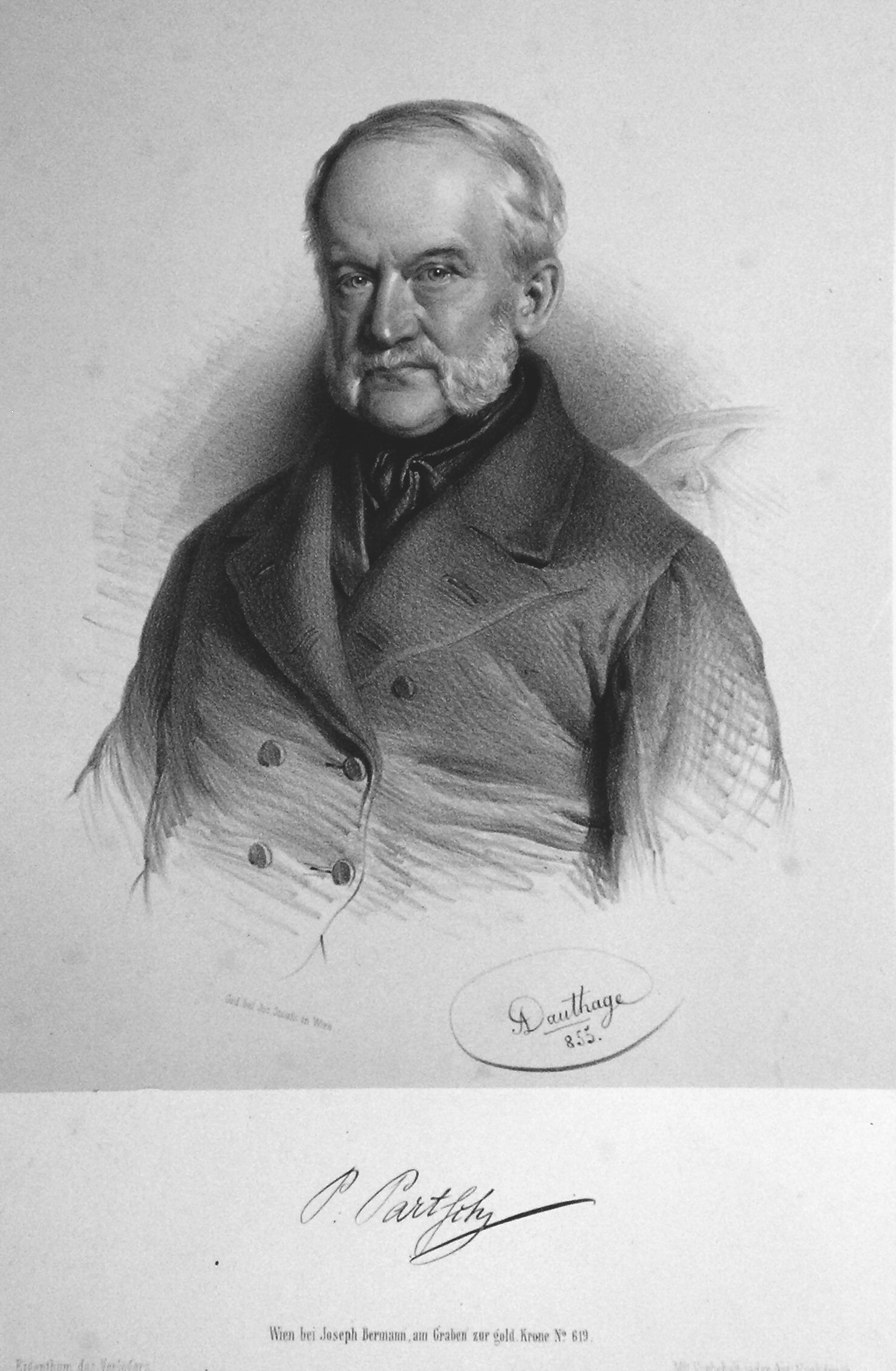

Paul Maria Joseph Partsch (11 June 1791 – 3 October 1856) was an Austrian geologist and mineralogist. He was in charge of the mineral collections of the Imperial Natural History Cabinet of Austria. He was succeeded by Moritz Hörnes.

== Life and work ==
Partsch was born in Vienna to imperial secretary Josef and Katharina, née Martini. He studied at the Neustadt Military Academy from 1799 and at the Löwenburg boarding school from 1803. He then followed the family tradition and studied law at the University of Vienna but was more interested in the lectures on botany, chemistry and mineralogy. He left in 1814 to work at the Göttweig Abbey on the advice of his guardian Ignaz von Krehs. He began to collect plants and examined the associations of plants and soils. In 1815 he returned to Vienna and found a home in Mariahilfer Straße and began to plan travel and study. He was introduced to Rochus Schüch of the Imperial Natural History Cabinet and began to study the contents. He was also introduced to Carl Franz Anton Ritter von Schreibers. Schüch moved to Brazil in 1817 along with Archduchess Leopoldine and Partsch was employed in the mineral cabinet by Schreibers. He then went on a study trip to the Freiberg Mining Academy, listened to lectures by August Breithaupt and then to France where he met Brongniart, Rene Hauy, Faujas and others. He visited Switzerland and Germany before returning in 1818. His position at the mineral cabinet was however made non-permanent by Andreas Joseph von Stifft. He then joined Baron Jeszenak to travel to Mount Vesuvius around 1820. He became a private tutor to several noble households to earn a living. With the money earned he made a trip to Moravia with the chemist Benjamin Scholz. He was made a guardian of the collections in 1824 working along with Vincenz Kollar but not given a permanent position. Along with Professor Franz Xaver Riepl he was commissioned to examine the threat of a volcanic eruption on the island of Meleda. It was discovered that the problem was the collapse of an underground karst cave. He was also involved in a geological survey of Transylvania. Partsch worked with Friedrich Mohs on reorganizing the mineral collection from 1826. Mohs gave lectures from 1828 and Partsch organized them. It was only in 1835, following the death of Emperor Franz I and the removal of powers from von Stifft, that he was given a permanent position, as a curator of the collections. By 1842 the collections included nearly 50,000 specimens of rocks, minerals, meteorites and fossils. In 1838 it was valued at 240,112 guilders. Schreibers retired in 1851 and Partsch became head of the imperial cabinet. In 1838 he introduced Moriz Hoernes as an intern and who would succeed Partsch. In 1848 his health declined and he spent the next year at a spa in Bad Tüffer. In 1850, his mother died at the age of 82. In 1856 he developed a slight paralysis. He lost consciousness and died three days later on October 3. He was buried at the Schmelzer cemetery.
