= László Csaba =

Hungarian architect

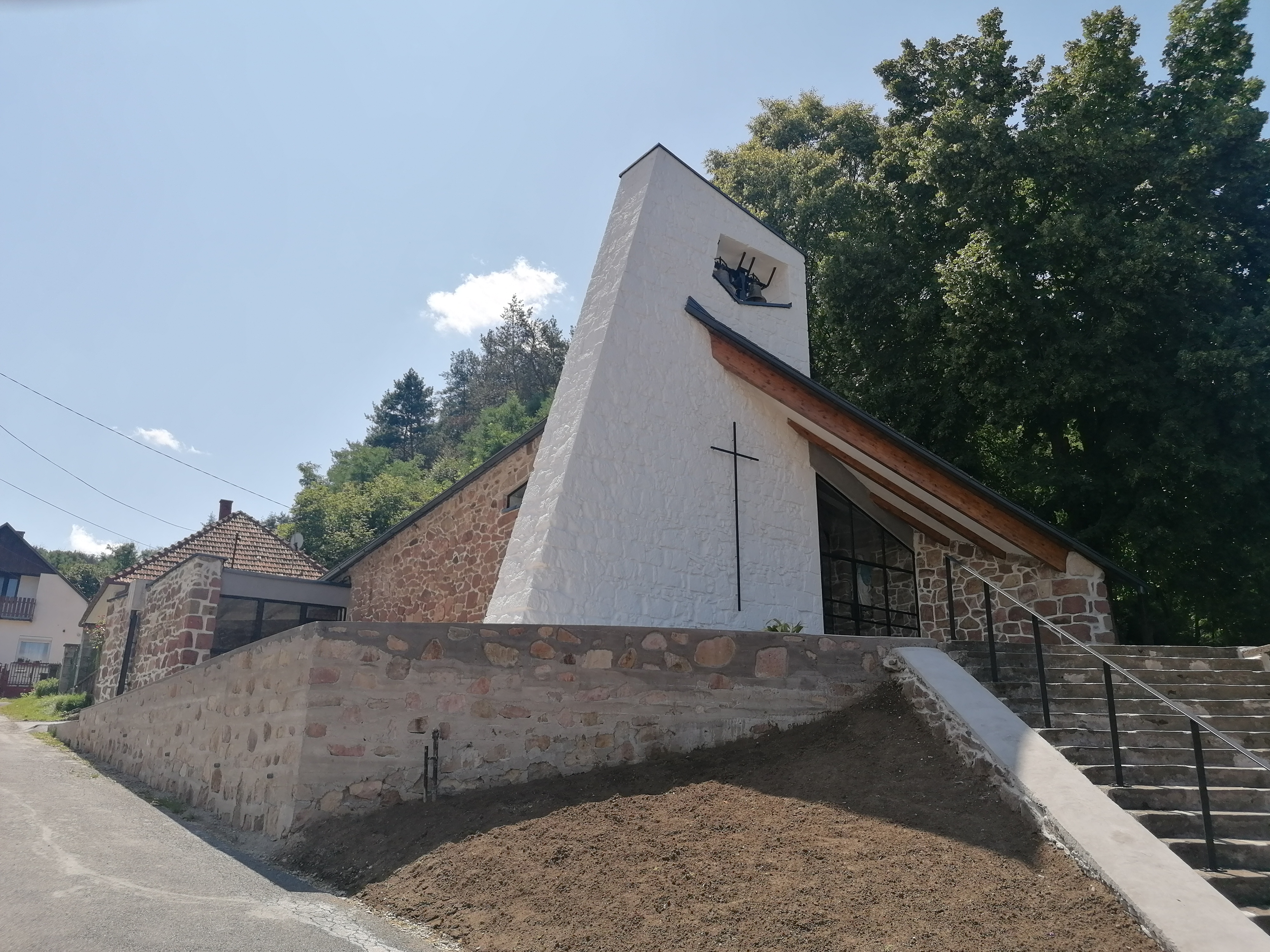
The church of Cserépváralja following a renovation in 2023.

László Csaba (Budapest, 9 October 1924 – Budapest, 18 January 1995) was a Hungarian architect. He is responsible for the design and construction of the Roman Catholic church of Cserépváralja, a small modernist church which finished construction in 1962.
