= Joseph Maria Pernter =

Joseph Maria Pernter (15 March 1848 at Neumarkt, South Tyrol, – 20 December 1908 at Arco) was an Austrian Jesuit and scientist.

== Life ==
He entered the Society of Jesus after graduation from the Gymnasia at Bolzano and Merano. For a time he acted as professor of physics at Kalocsa and Kalksburg.

In 1877 he was obliged to leave the order, for health reasons. He then studied physics at the University of Vienna and received the doctor's degree. After entering the Central Institute as volunteer in October, 1878, Pernter became assistant in 1880, and adjunct in 1884; in 1885 he also began to act as a privatdozent at the university.

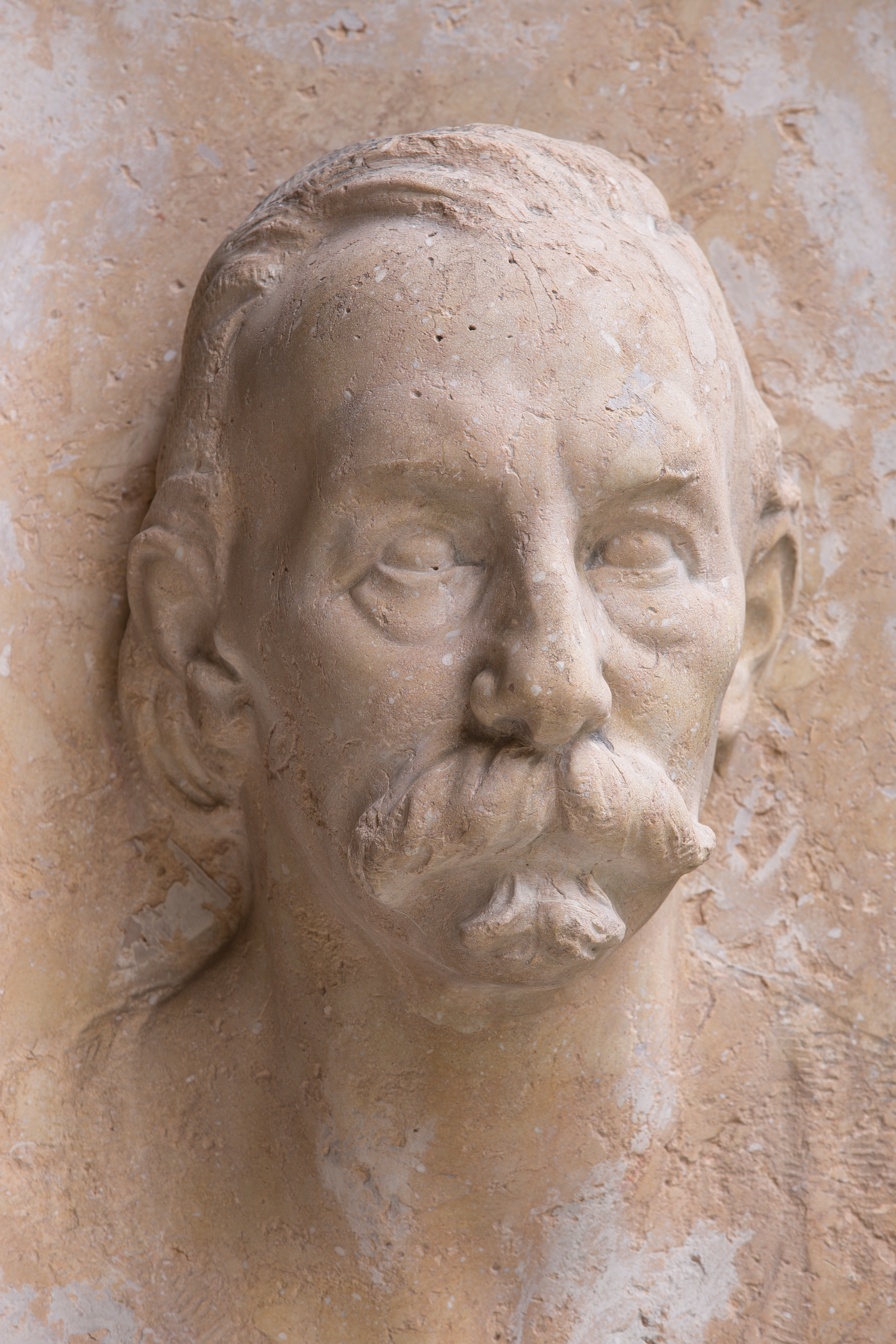
Relief (marble) of Pernter in the Arkadenhof of the University of Vienna

In 1890 he was called to the University of Innsbruck in the capacity of extraordinary professor, and in 1893 was appointed ordinary professor of cosmic physics.

In 1897 Pernter became professor at the University of Vienna, and director of the Central Meteorological Institute. He reorganized the institute and extended it considerably, increasing the staff from fifteen to thirty-one. He made it possible for the institute to take part in balloon ascents for scientific purposes. A laboratory, a printing office, a reading room, etc., were added, also a bureau for seismic observations. Instruments for recording earth tremors were set up, and the institute supervised the network of stations for the study of earthquakes, its name being changed to "Zentralanstalt für Meteorologie und Geodynamik".

Pernter was also one of the founders of the "Leo-Gesellschaft" in Vienna and of the branch at Innsbruck.

== Works ==
At Innsbruck he began a number of works including papers on the conditions of wind, humidity, radiation, and meteorological optics. In his most important work "Meteorologische Optik", he collected all published treatises and also supplied original papers necessary to complete certain subjects; he died before he had finished it. His German translation of Abercromby's work, "The weather", is also noteworthy.

He introduced various improvements in practical weather forecasting, such as the free delivery of forecasts in the summer to all telegraph stations. During his directorate were introduced the experiments on so-called "weather-shooting", as a prevention of the dangers due to hail. These experiments created considerable interest in the agricultural circles of Austria and Italy. Pernter examined the matter carefully, and came to a conclusion that proved to be the deathblow of this practice.

In the essay "Voraussetzungslose Forschung, freie Wissenschaft und Katholizismus", published during the Mommsen agitation, he sought to prove the possibility of combining strict religious faith with exact research.
