= Johann August Natterer =

Austrian physician and chemist

Johann August Natterer (19 October 1821 – 25 December 1900) was an Austrian physician and chemist.

Born in Vienna, he was the son of Joseph Natterer (1786 –1852) and a nephew to naturalist Johann Natterer (1787–1843). In 1847, he obtained his medical doctorate from the University of Vienna, later practicing medicine in Wien-Leopoldstadt.

In 1854, he attempted to liquefy "permanent gases" using pressures up to 3600 bars (about 3550 atm), but failed. This was because those gases have a critical temperature far lower than what Natterer could cool the gas to. Consequently, no matter how high the pressure he could achieve, there would be no phase transition from gas to liquid.

Along with his brother Josef Natterer (1819–1862), he is remembered for pioneer experiments in the field of photography. In 1841, using a Voigtländer camera on daguerreotype plates that were prepared according to a chemical process developed by Franz Kratochwila, they were able to increase the sensitivity five-fold, and reportedly achieved exposure times as low as 5 to 6 seconds in clear weather.

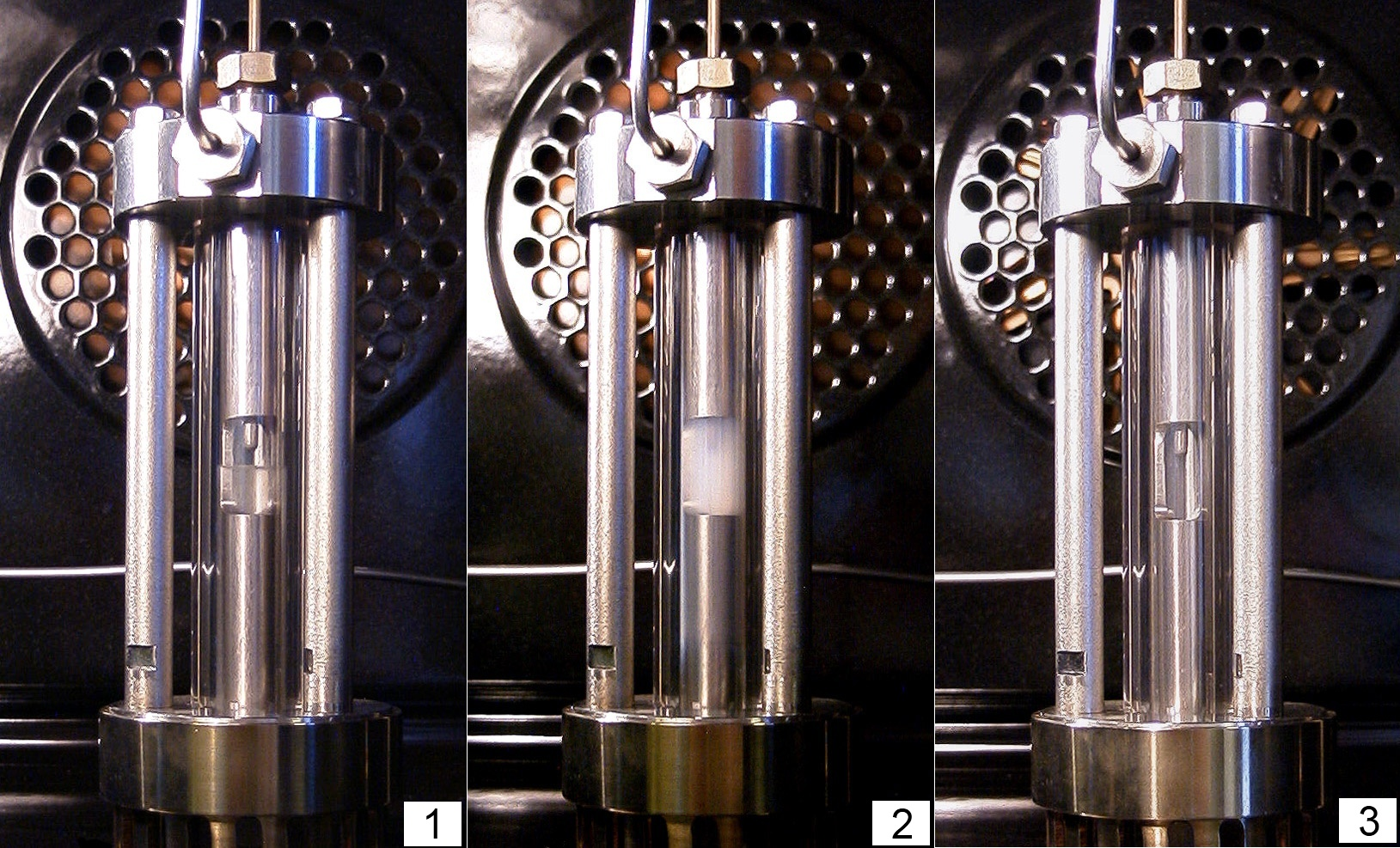
Left-to-right sequence of heating a mass of ethane in a constant volume. In the center panel, critical opalescence is seen.

In the mid-1840s, using a compressed air chamber pump invented by J. Schembor (1777–1851), he was the first scientist to produce liquid carbon dioxide in significant quantities. His name is associated with a sealed and constant volume vessel known as a "Natterer's tube". The glass tube can demonstrate the critical point of carbon dioxide (30.98 C, 72.8 atm), which is visible as critical opalescence and the disappearance of the meniscus.
